= Professor Mike Donovan =

American boxer and boxing trainer

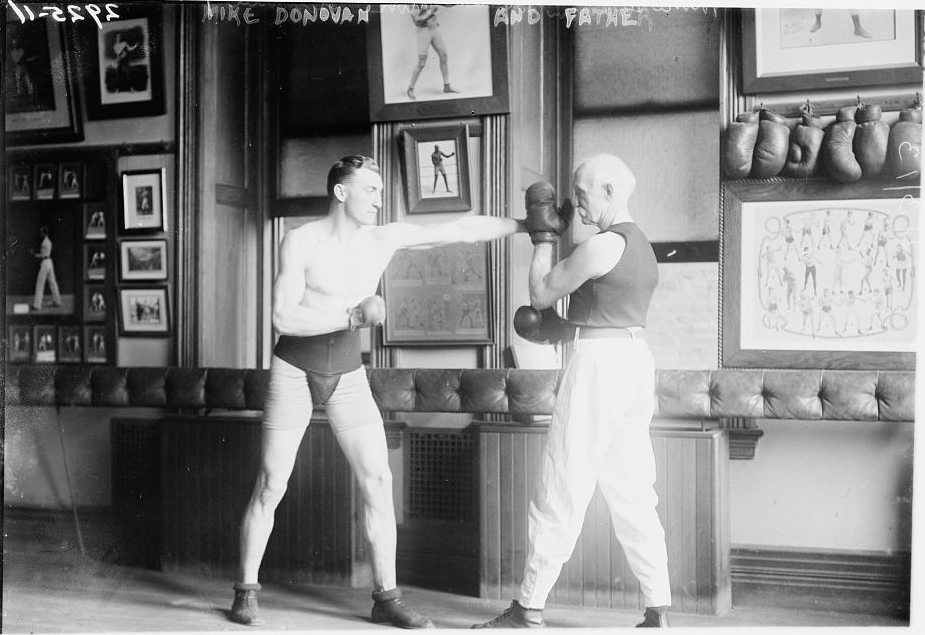
- Professor Mike Donovan (on right) helping his son train, c.1910s
- Born: Michael O'Donovan; September 27, 1847; Chicago, Illinois, U.S.
- Died: March 24, 1918 (aged 70); The Bronx, New York, U.S.
- Other names: Professor Mike, Professor Mike O'Donovan
- Height: 1.73 m (5 ft 8 in)
- Reach: 67 in (170 cm)
- Style: Orthodox
- Fighting out of: New York City, New York, U.S.

Professional boxing record
- Total: 36
- Wins: 25
- By knockout: 2
- Losses: 4
- By knockout: 3
- Draws: 7

Mike Donovan (September 27, 1847 – March 24, 1918) also known as Professor Mike Donovan and Mike O'Donovan was a middleweight boxer of the bare-knuckle era and later became one of the foremost teachers of the sport.

== Biography ==
=== Professional boxing career ===
During his career, Donovan fought John L. Sullivan. He fought John Shanssey in a bout refereed by a young 21-year-old Wyatt Earp on July 4, 1868 or 1869 in Cheyenne, Wyoming.

=== Life as instructor after retirement from boxing ===
After his active boxing career ended, Donovan became a boxing instructor at the New York Athletic Club. He taught United States President Teddy Roosevelt and his sons how to box.

=== Personal life, death and legacy ===
He was married to Cecilia and had 8 children: John J. Donovan, Margaret Donovan, Henry H. Donovan, Arthur Donovan, Mary V. Donovan, Helen Donovan, Lucy A. Donovan and Katherine Donovan. Donovan died from complications from a bout with pneumonia he developed while teaching a boxing class at one of the armories located near where he had resided in the Bronx, New York area on March 24, 1918, at St. Francis Hospital there, where he had been hospitalized for a week after coming down with pneumonia, at the age of 70. He was survived by his wife and children, who all had been at his bedside when he died. After his death, Donovan's will indicated that his last name was actually O'Donovan. His silver championship belt was bequeathed to his son, Arthur Donovan (who himself would later become a legend in the boxing sport as a referee), who was serving in the U.S. Army, in the 105th Field Artillery at Spartanburg, South Carolina at the time, during World War I. His grandson, Art Donovan Jr., is a member of the Pro Football Hall of Fame.

== Honors ==
Donovan has been elected to the IBHOF.

== Notes/References ==
- The Boxing Register: International Boxing Hall of Fame Official Record Book (4th Edition), By James B. Roberts, Alexander G. Skutt, page 23, McBooks Press, Ithaca, NY, ISBN 978-1-59013-121-3, 2006.
