= John Shanssey =

American boxer and politician (1848–1919?)

John Shanssey (March 23, 1848 – 1919?) was an American boxer, gambler, saloon owner, and Mayor of Yuma, Arizona. He fought Mike Donovan in a bout refereed by a young 21-year-old Wyatt Earp on July 4, 1868, or 1869 in Cheyenne, Wyoming. Shanssey is an alternative spelling, based on local Irish pronunciation, of the Irish surname Shaughnessy.
