= Wyatt Earp =

American lawman (1848–1929)

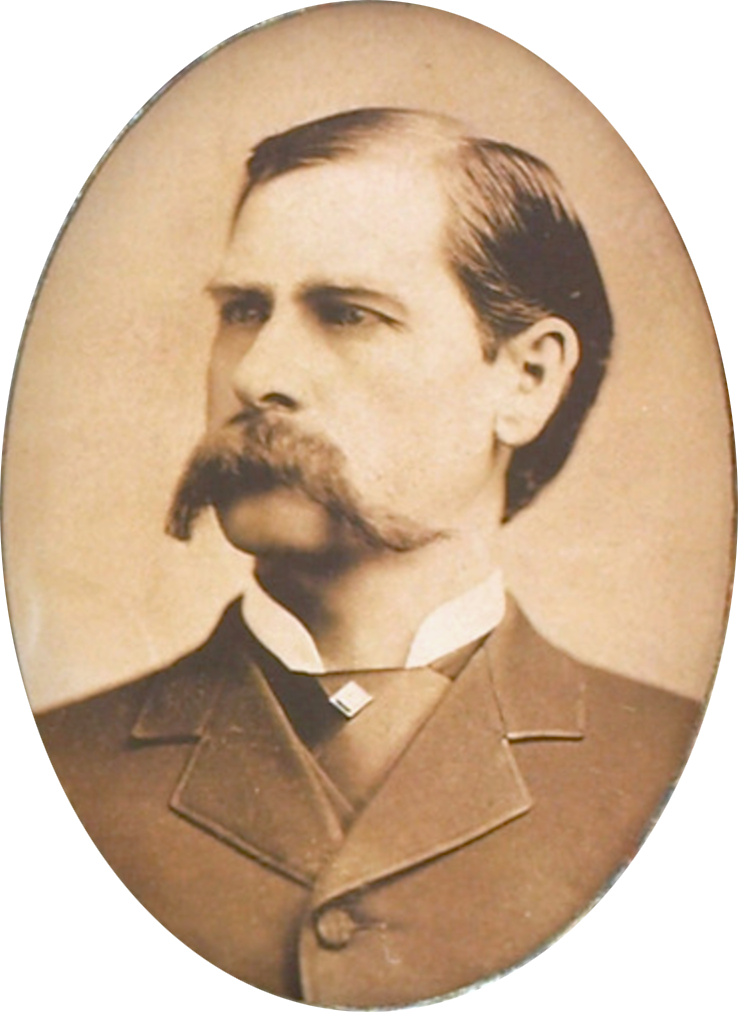
- Earp at about age 39
- Born: Wyatt Berry Stapp Earp; March 19, 1848; Monmouth, Illinois, U.S.
- Died: January 13, 1929 (aged 80); Los Angeles, California, U.S.
- Occupations: Lawman; buffalo hunter; saloon keeper; miner; brothel keeper; boxing referee
- Years active: 1865–1898
- Known for: Gunfight at the O.K. Corral; Fitzsimmons vs. Sharkey boxing match decision
- Height: 6 ft 0 in (1.83 m) at age 30
- Opponents: William Brocius; Tom McLaury; Frank McLaury; Ike Clanton; Billy Clanton; Billy Claiborne; Johnny Behan
- Spouses: Urilla Sutherland (m. 1870; died 1870); Sally Heckell (1872–1872) (Note: Common-law marriage); Mattie Blaylock (m. 1878–1881); Josephine Marcus (m. 1882)
- Parents: Nicholas Porter Earp; Virginia Ann Cooksey
- Relatives: Newton Earp (brother); James Earp (brother); Virgil Earp (brother); Morgan Earp (brother); Warren Earp (brother)

Wyatt Berry Stapp Earp (March 19, 1848 – January 13, 1929) was an American lawman and an Assistant Town Marshal to his brother, Virgil Earp. Earp was involved in the 1881 gunfight at the O.K. Corral, during which he and other lawmen killed three outlaws. While Earp is usually depicted as the key figure in the shootout, his brother Virgil was both a Deputy U.S. Marshal and the Tombstone, Arizona City Marshal and had decided to enforce a City Ordinance prohibiting carrying firearms in public in an attempt to neutralize the loosely organized group of outlaws known as the Cochise County Cowboys.

In 1874, Wyatt Earp arrived in the rising boomtown of cattle drive destination Wichita, Kansas, where his companion, sometimes mistakingly referred to as his wife, Maddie, purportedly opened a brothel. At this brothel, Earp was arrested more than once it was alleged that he may have been a pimp. He was appointed to the Wichita Police force and developed a good reputation as a lawman but was "not rehired as a Police Officer" after a physical altercation with a political opponent of his boss. Earp left Wichita, following his brother James to Dodge City, Kansas, where his Jim's wife Bessie and Earp's common-law wife Sally operated a brothel. In Dodge City, he became an Assistant City Marshal serving with Bat Masterson. In 1878, he went to Texas to track down an outlaw, Dave Rudabaugh, and met John "Doc" Holliday, whom Wyatt credited with saving his life.

Earp moved between boom towns. He left Dodge City in 1879 and moved with brothers James and Virgil, later joined by his younger brother Morgan, to Tombstone, Arizona; where a silver rush boom was underway. The Earps held law enforcement positions from Virgil as City Marshal to Wyatt and Morgan as Deputy City Marshals that put them in conflict with an outlaw group known as the "Cowboys", who threatened to kill the Earps on several occasions. The conflict escalated, culminating in the shootout at the O.K. Corral in 1881, where the Earps and Doc Holliday killed three Cowboys. During the next five months, Virgil was ambushed and maimed and Morgan was murdered. Wyatt Earp was sworn in a Deputy U.S. Marshal along with Warren Earp, Doc Holliday and others formed a U.S. Marshal Posse that killed three more Cowboys whom they thought responsible for the prior attacks on the Earps. Earp was never wounded in any of the gunfights, unlike his brothers Virgil and Morgan or Doc Holliday, which added to his mystique after his death.

After leaving Tombstone, Earp went to San Francisco, where he reunited with Josephine Marcus, and they later joined a gold rush to Eagle City, Idaho. In San Francisco, Earp raced horses, but his reputation suffered when he refereed the Fitzsimmons vs. Sharkey boxing match and called a foul, leading many to believe he had fixed the fight. When Earp appeared in the ring to act as referee, Police Captain Wittman disarmed him of a large pistol before the bout began. That night, Earp was arrested on a charge of carrying a concealed weapon and released on bail. Earp and Marcus joined the Nome Gold Rush in 1899. He and Charlie Hoxie opened the Dexter saloon, and made an estimated $80,000 (equivalent to $3,096,000 in 2025). At the time, Josephine had a gambling habit, and the money did not last. Around 1911, Earp began working mining claims in Vidal, California, retiring in the summers with Josephine to one of several cottages they rented in Los Angeles. He made friends among Western actors in Hollywood to try to get his story told but was portrayed during his lifetime only briefly in one film, Wild Bill Hickok (1923).

Earp died in 1929, notorious for his handling of the Fitzsimmons–Sharkey fight and role in the O.K. Corral gunfight. This changed only after his death when the flattering biography Wyatt Earp: Frontier Marshal by Stuart N. Lake was published in 1931, becoming a bestseller and creating his reputation as a fearless lawman. Since then, Earp's fame and notoriety have been increased by films, television shows, biographies, and works of fiction. Long after his death, he has many devoted detractors and admirers.

== Early life ==
Wyatt Berry Stapp Earp was born on March 19, 1848, in Monmouth, Illinois, the fourth child of Nicholas Porter Earp and his second wife, Virginia Ann Cooksey. He was named after his father's commanding officer in the Mexican–American War, Captain Wyatt Berry Stapp, of the 2nd Company, Illinois Mounted Volunteers. Some evidence supports Earp's birthplace as 406 S. 3rd St. in Monmouth, Illinois, though the street address is disputed.

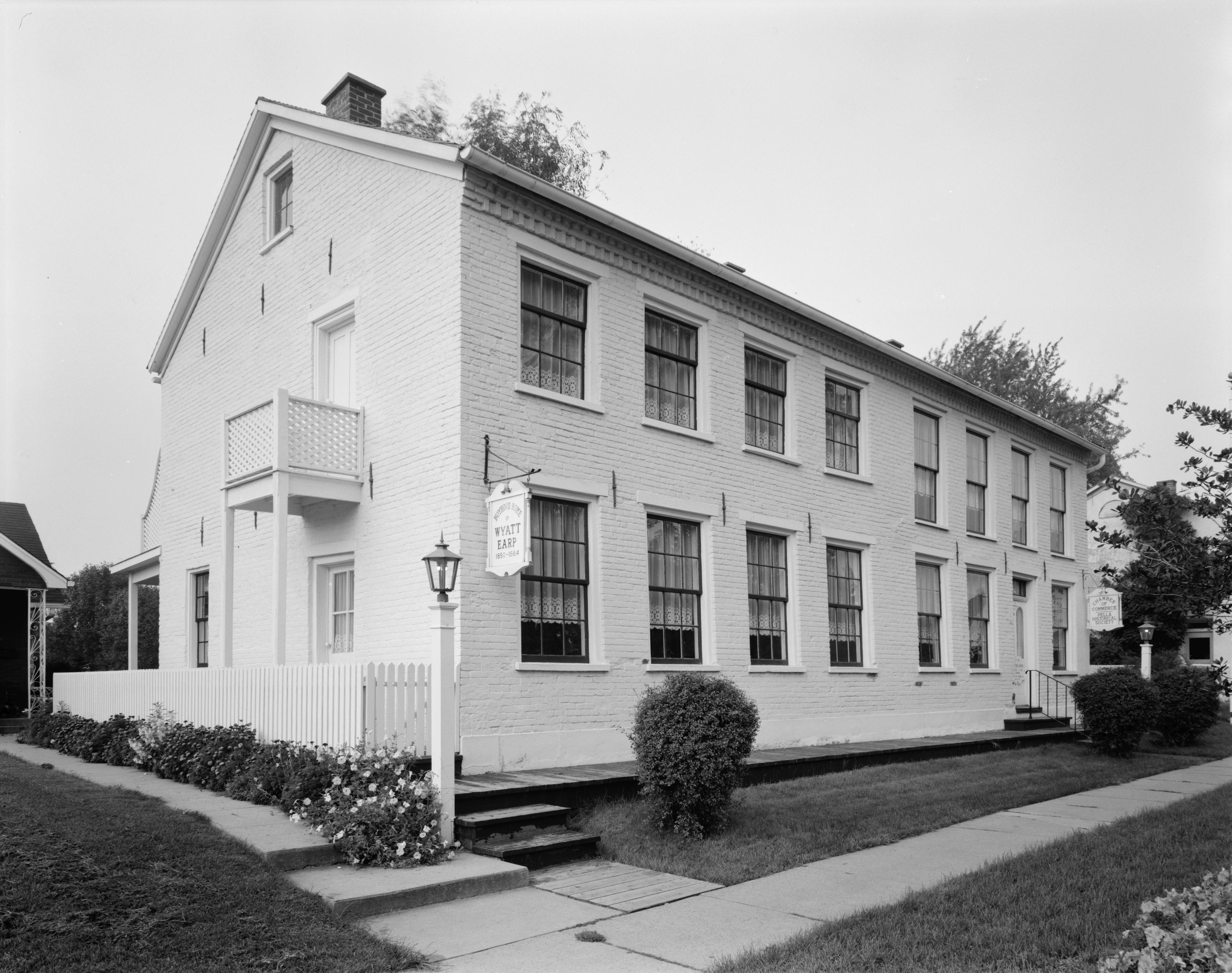
Earp's boyhood home in Pella, Iowa

In March 1849, or in early 1850, Nicholas Earp joined about a hundred other people in a plan to relocate to San Bernardino County, California, where he intended to buy farmland. Just 150 miles (240 km) west of Monmouth on the journey, their daughter Martha became ill. The family stopped and Nicholas bought a new 160-acre (65 ha) farm 7 miles (11 km) northeast of Pella, Iowa, where Martha died on May 26, 1856.

Nicholas and Virginia Earp's last child, Adelia, was born in June 1861 in Pella. Newton, James, and Virgil joined the Union Army on November 11, 1861. Their father was busy recruiting and drilling local companies, so Earp and his two younger brothers, Morgan and Warren, were left in charge of tending 80 acres (32 ha) of corn. Earp tried several times to run away and enlist, but at 13, he was too young. Each time, his father found him and brought him home. James was severely wounded in Fredericktown, Missouri, and returned home in summer 1863. Newton and Virgil fought several battles in Missouri, Mississippi, and Tennessee, and later followed the family to California.

== Adult life ==
=== California ===
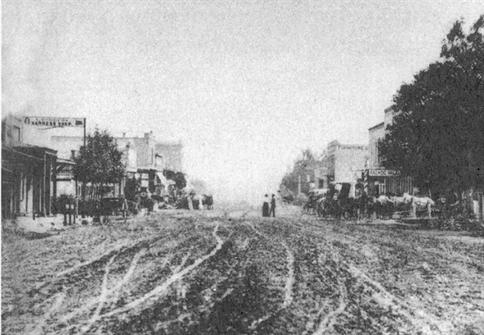
Looking east from D St. toward 3rd St. in downtown San Bernardino in 1864

On May 12, 1864, Nicholas Earp organized a wagon train and headed to San Bernardino, California, arriving on December 17. By late summer 1865, Virgil found work as a driver for Phineas Banning's stagecoach line in California's Imperial Valley, and 16-year-old Earp assisted. In spring 1866, Earp became a teamster transporting cargo for Chris Taylor from 1866 to 1868. He drove cargo over 720 miles (1,160 km) on the wagon road from Wilmington through San Bernardino, then Las Vegas, Nevada, to Salt Lake City, Utah Territory.

In spring 1868, Earp was hired to transport supplies for the Union Pacific Railroad. He learned gambling and boxing while working on the railhead in the Wyoming Territory and developed a reputation from officiating boxing matches. He also refereed a fight between John Shanssey and Prof. Mike Donovan.

=== Lawman and marriage ===
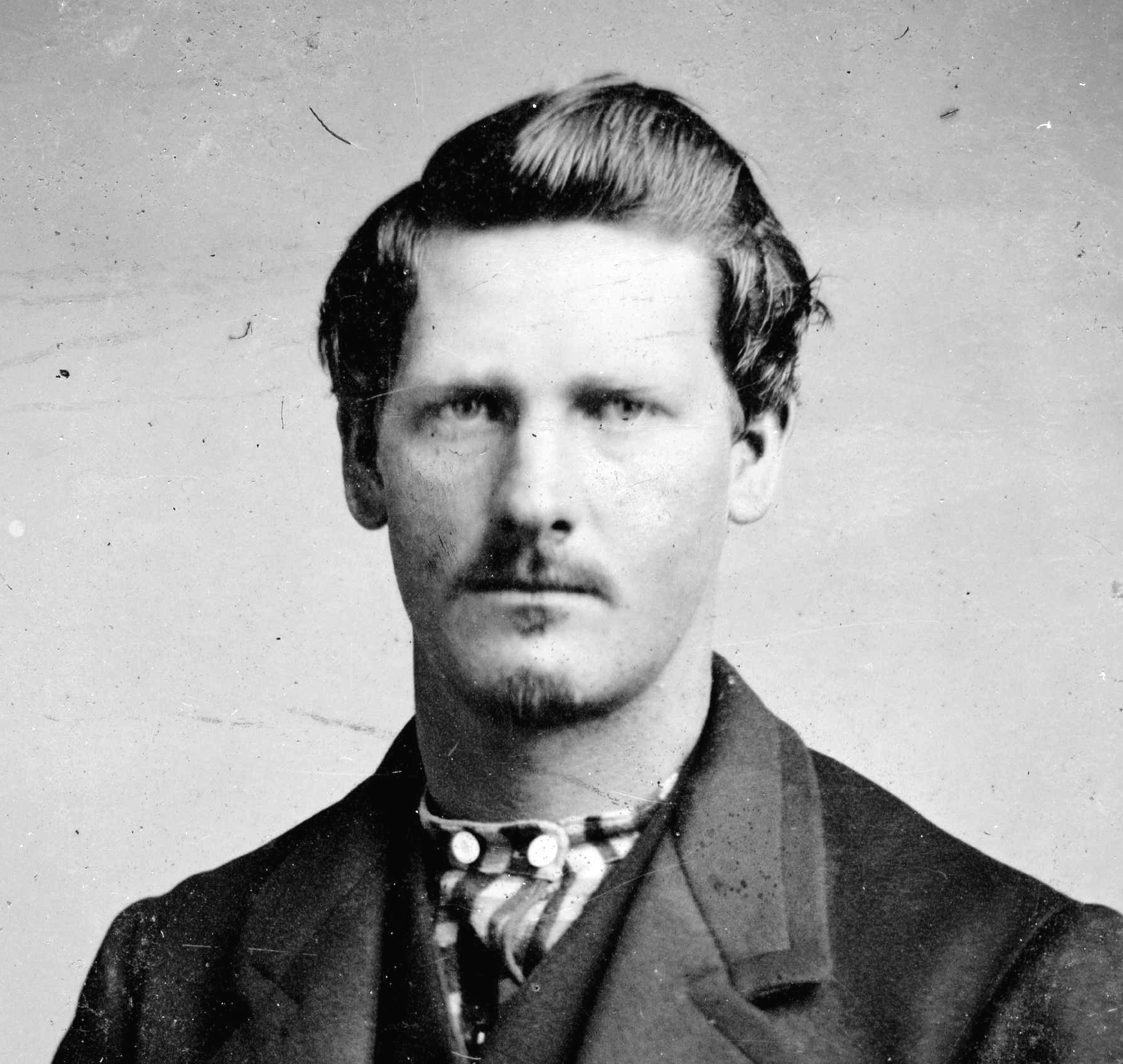
Earp, age 21 in 1869 or 1870, while married to Urilla Sutherland; taken in Lamar, Missouri

In spring 1868, the Earps moved East again to Lamar, Missouri, where Earp's father, Nicholas, became the local constable. Earp rejoined the family the next year, and Nicholas resigned as constable on November 17, 1869. Earp was appointed constable in his place.

=== First gunfight ===
Earp went to Beardstown, Illinois, where he spent the summer of 1869. Beardstown was undergoing a boom thanks to a rail line being laid through town.

During that summer in Beardstown, a railroad brakeman named Tom Pinard mocked Wyatt, calling him "the California boy", a euphemism for coward, implying that Wyatt had gone to California to avoid serving in the Civil War. Although Wyatt had attempted to join the army at 13 and had been stopped by his father, he took offense at Piner's remarks. They fought inside Walton's Hotel, a brothel owned by John T. Walton, and Wyatt tossed Pinard outside. Both men drew their guns and exchanged shots; Wyatt wounded Pinard in the hip.

=== Marriage to Urilla Sutherland ===
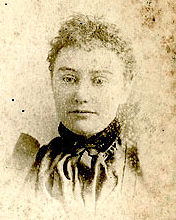
Urilla Sutherland married Earp on January 10, 1870

In late 1869, Wyatt Earp courted 20-year-old Urilla Sutherland, daughter of William and Permelia Sutherland, who operated the Exchange Hotel in Lamar, Missouri, the Barton County seat. They were married by Wyatt's father on January 10, 1870. Wyatt bought a lot on the outskirts of town for $50, where he built a house in August 1870. Urilla was about to deliver their first child when she died from typhoid fever.

=== Lawsuits and charges ===
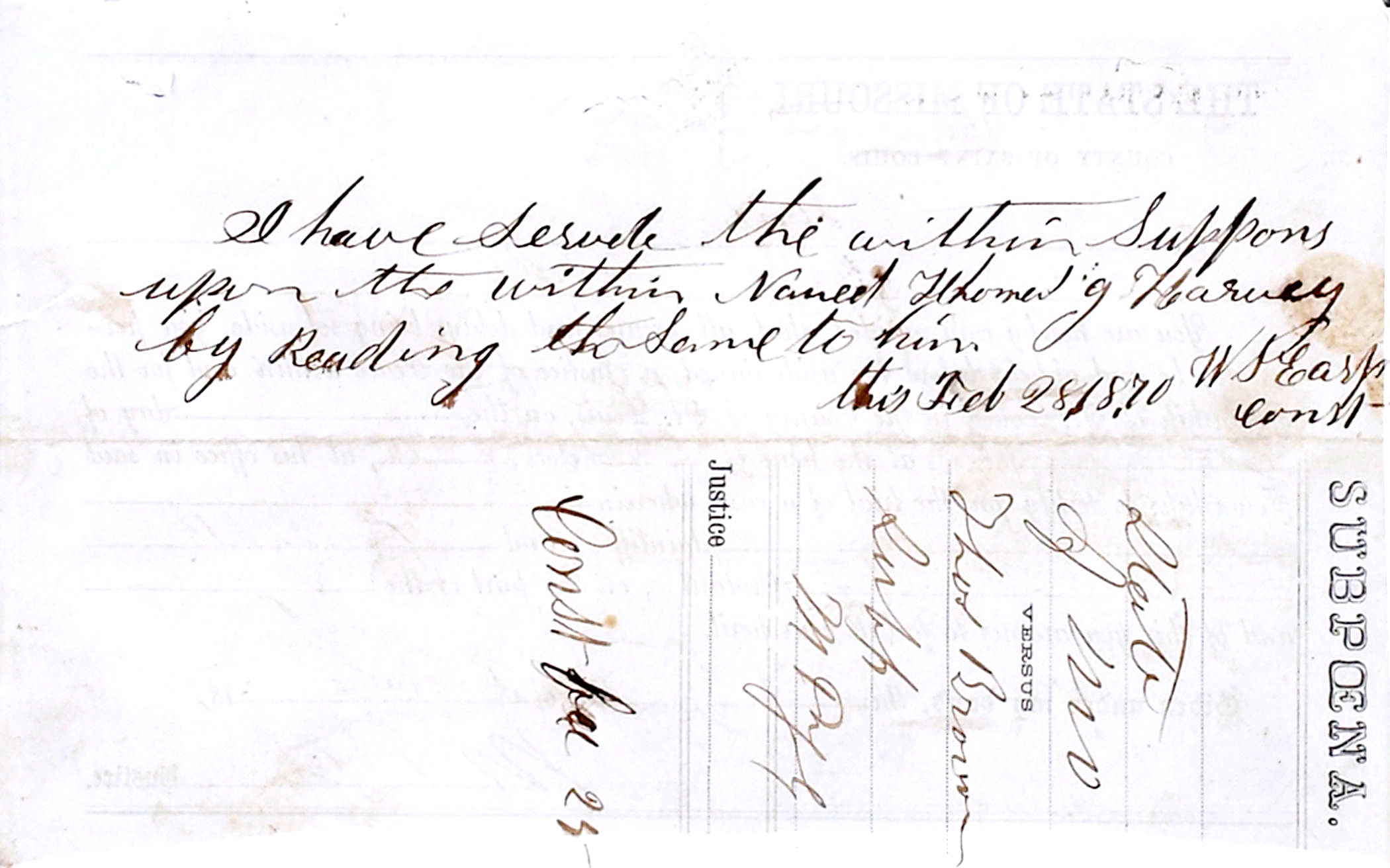
Lamar, Missouri, subpoena signed by Constable Wyatt Earp, February 28, 1870

Wyatt Earp went through a downward spiral after Urilla's death and had a series of legal problems. On March 14, 1871, Barton County filed a lawsuit against him for $200 (~$5,311 today) and his sureties, including his father. He was in charge of collecting license fees for Lamar, which were designated to fund local schools, but had failed to turn the money over to the county.

On March 28, 1871, Wyatt Earp, Edward Kennedy, and John Shown were charged with stealing two horses from William Keys while in the Indian country, "each of the value of $100". Only three days later on March 31, James Cromwell filed a lawsuit against him alleging that he had erased and rewritten a dollar figure on a judgment against Cromwell and that Wyatt had collected and kept the difference. The court seized Cromwell's mowing machine and sold it for $38 to make up the difference between what Wyatt turned in and what Cromwell owed. Cromwell's suit claimed that Earp owed him the estimated machine value of $75.

On April 6, Deputy U.S. Marshal J. G. Owens arrested Earp for the horse theft. Commissioner James Churchill arraigned him on April 14 and set bail at $500. Wyatt was summoned to appear at a hearing, and before he could appear, Wyatt sold his property, escaped through the roof of the jail, and headed for Peoria, Illinois.

On May 15, an indictment was issued against Wyatt, Kennedy, and Shown. John Shown's wife, Anna, claimed that Wyatt and Kennedy got her husband drunk and then threatened his life to persuade him to help steal the horses. On June 5, Kennedy was acquitted, while the case against Wyatt and Shown remained open. The new constable wrote that he had "good reason to believe [and] does believe that Wyatt S. Earp def[initely] is not a resident of this state, that Wyatt S. Earp has absconded or absented himself from his usual place of abode in this state so that the ordinary process of law cannot be processed against him."

=== Pimping arrests in Peoria ===
Peoria had grown to a city of 22,000 in the 1870s and had earned a reputation as a wide-open city whose community leaders mostly ignored illegal alcohol use, gambling, prostitution, and other vices. But Peoria police raided a brothel on February 24, 1872, and arrested Wyatt and Morgan Earp, George Randall, and four women including Jane Haspel. The men were charged with "keeping and being found in a house of ill-fame," and later fined $20 and court costs. In Root's Peoria City Directory for 1872–73, published on March 1, 1872, Wyatt is a resident in the home of Jane Haspel at Washington Street near the corner of Hamilton. Wyatt was likely residing in the brothel when he was arrested.

Both Earps were arrested for the same crime again on May 11. "Wyat [sic] Earp and his brother Morgan Earp were each fined $44.55 and as they had not the money and would not work, they languish in the cold and silent calaboose ..." After being freed, Wyatt and Morgan visited their sister Adelia in the family home in Lamar, Missouri. Wyatt returned to the Peoria area.

On September 10, 1872, Wyatt was arrested aboard the Beardstown Gunboat, a 50-foot keelboat fitted with a ramshackle, eight-bedroom house and used as a floating brothel. The keelboat was owned by John T. Walton, the same man who three years earlier operated the brothel in Beardstown where Wyatt had his first gunfight. A prostitute named Sally Heckell was arrested with him, and she called herself his wife; she was likely the 16-year-old daughter of Jane Haspel.

The Peoria Daily National Democrat reported:

Some of the women are said to be good-looking, but all appear to be terribly depraved. John Walton, the skipper of the boat, and Wyatt Earp, the Peoria Bummer, were each fined $43.15. Sarah Earp, alias Sally Heckell, calls herself the wife of Wyatt Earp.

By calling Wyatt the "Peoria Bummer," the newspaper categorized him with "contemptible loafers who impose on hard-working citizens", a "beggar" and "worse-than-tramps." Wyatt and Walton were fined $44, more than any others who were arrested.

During a conversation with Wyatt Earp years later, Stuart N. Lake took notes in which Earp claimed that he'd been hunting buffalo during the winter of 1871–1872. Earp told Lake that he "arrived in Wichita direct from my buffalo hunt in '74," but there's no evidence that he ever hunted buffalo. He may have made up the story to account for the time he was pimping in Illinois and Missouri.

=== Wichita, Kansas ===
In early 1874 Wyatt and Sally moved 500 miles (800 km) southwest to the growing cow town of Wichita where his brother James ran a brothel with his wife Nellie "Bessie" Ketchum. Local arrest records show that Sally and Nellie managed the brothel from early 1874 to the middle of 1876. Historian Gary L. Roberts claims that Wyatt was more likely an enforcer than a pimp. When the Kansas state census was completed in June 1875, Sally was no longer living with Wyatt, James, and Bessie.

Wichita was a railroad terminal and a destination for cattle drives from Texas. When the cattle drive arrived, the town filled with drunken, armed cowboys celebrating the end of their long journey, keeping the lawmen busy. When the cowboys left at the end of the cattle drive, Wyatt searched for something else to do. The Wichita City Eagle reported on October 29, 1874, that Wyatt had helped an off-duty police officer find thieves who stole a man's wagon. Wyatt officially joined the Wichita marshal's office on April 21, 1875, after the election of Mike Meagher as city marshal (or police chief), making $100 per month. He also dealt faro at the Long Branch Saloon. In late 1875 the Wichita Beacon published this story:

On last Wednesday (December 8), policeman Earp found a stranger lying near the bridge in a drunken stupor. He took him to the 'cooler' and, on searching him, found about $500 on his person. He was taken the next morning, before his honor, the police judge, paid his fine for his fun like a little man and went on his way rejoicing. He may congratulate himself that his lines, while he was drunk, were cast in such a pleasant place as Wichita, as there are but a few other places where that $500 bankroll would have been heard from. The integrity of our police force has never been seriously questioned.

Wyatt Earp's stint as a Wichita deputy came to an end on April 2, 1876, when former marshal Bill Smith accused him of using his office to hire his brothers as lawmen. Wyatt beat Smith in a fist fight and was fined $30. The local newspaper reported, "It is but justice to Wyatt to say he has made an excellent officer." Meagher won the election, but the city council voted against rehiring Wyatt. Wyatt followed his brother James and his wife in 1876 as they moved west to Dodge City after it became the “queen of the cow towns.”

=== Dodge City and Deadwood ===
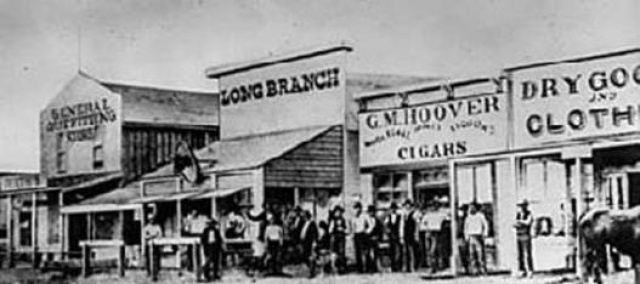
Wyatt dealt faro at the Long Branch Saloon in Dodge City, Kansas.

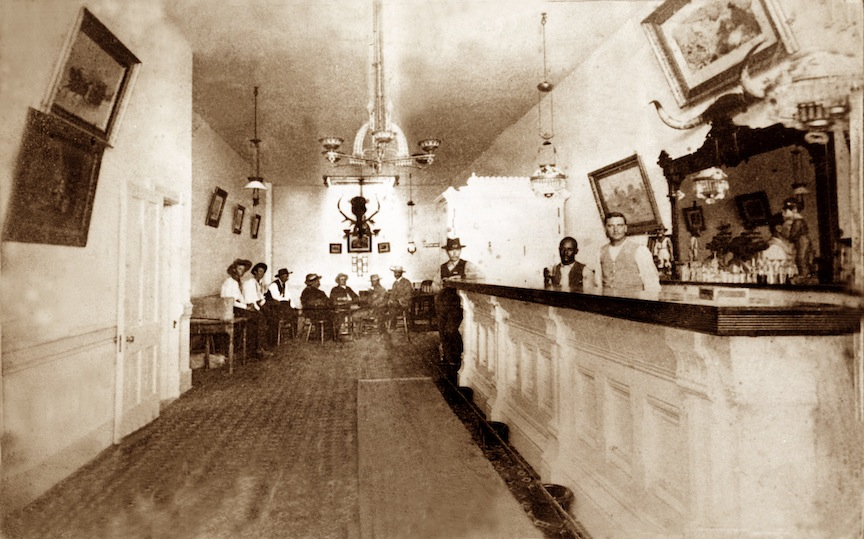
Inside the Long Branch Saloon in Dodge City, Kansas, c. 1870–1885

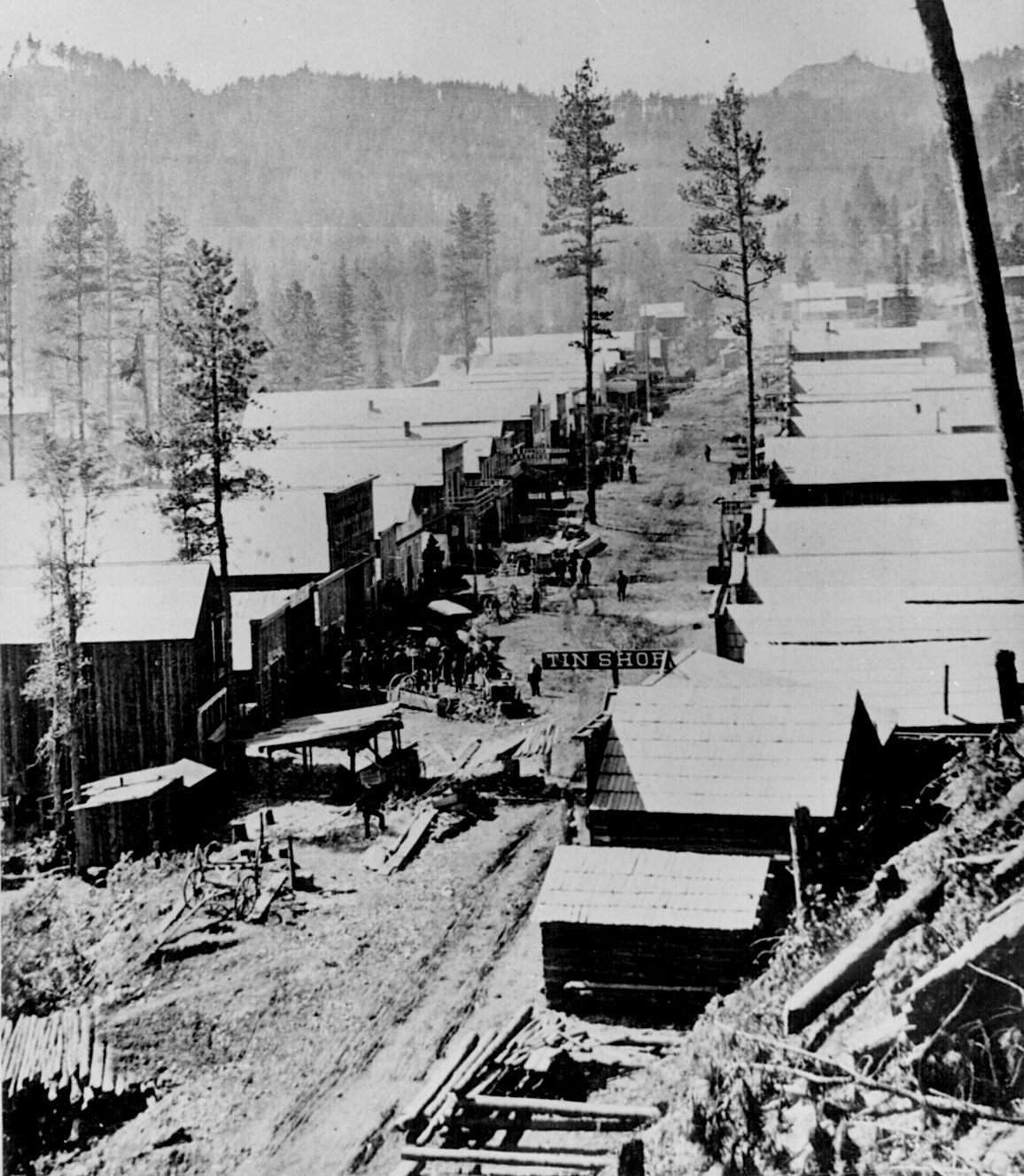
Deadwood in 1876 from a nearby hill

After 1875 Dodge City, Kansas, became a major terminal for cattle drives from Texas, Wyatt Earp was appointed assistant marshal in Dodge City under Marshal Lawrence Deger around May 1876. At some point he met prostitute Mattie Blaylock, who became his common-law wife until 1881. Wyatt and Morgan left Dodge for Deadwood in the Dakota Territory on September 9, 1876, with a team of horses only to find that all the land was already tied up in mining claims. While Morgan returned to Dodge City, Wyatt remained and made a deal to buy all the wood that a local individual had cut and put his horses to work during the winter of 1876–1877, hauling firewood into camp. Wyatt made about $5,000 in profit but was unable to file any mining claims, so he returned to Dodge City in the spring.

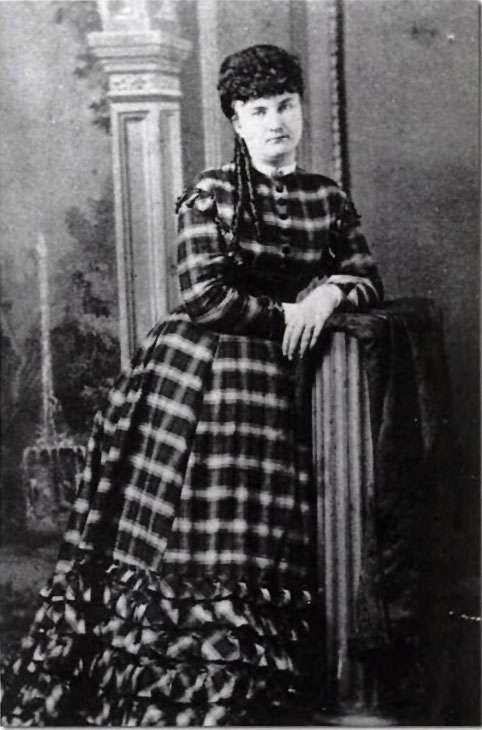
Wyatt's second wife, Mattie Blaylock

On Sunday, January 9, 1876, while sitting in the back room of the Custom House saloon, Wyatt Earp's revolver slipped from its holster and hit his chair. A .45 caliber round discharged because he left the hammer on a loaded chamber and punched a hole in his coat. The shot "got up a lively stampede from the room." Wyatt rejoined the Dodge City police in spring 1877 at the request of Mayor James H. Kelley. The Dodge City newspaper reported in July 1878 that he had been fined one dollar for slapping a muscular prostitute named Frankie Bell, who "heaped epithets upon the unoffending head of Mr. Earp to such an extent as to provide a slap from the ex-officer," according to the account. Bell spent the night in jail and was fined $20, while Wyatt's fine was the legal minimum.

In October 1877, outlaw Dave Rudabaugh robbed a Santa Fe Railroad construction camp and fled south. Wyatt was given a temporary commission as deputy U.S. Marshal and left Dodge City, following Rudabaugh over 400 miles (640 km) through Fort Clark, Texas, where the newspaper reported his presence on January 22, 1878, and then on to Fort Griffin, Texas.

In Fort Griffin, located between the military fort bearing the same name and the Clear Fork of the Brazos River, he went to the Bee Hive Saloon. It was the largest in town and owned by John Shanssey, whom Wyatt had known since he was 21. Shanssey told Wyatt that Rudabaugh had passed through town earlier in the week, but did not know where he was headed. Shanssey suggested that Wyatt ask gambler Doc Holliday, who played cards with Rudabaugh. Doc told Wyatt that Rudabaugh was headed back into Kansas.

By May 11, 1878, the Dodge newspapers reported that Wyatt Earp had returned. The Dodge City Times noted on May 14 that he'd been appointed Assistant Marshal for $75 per month, serving under Charlie Bassett. In mid-1878, Doc Holliday also arrived in Dodge City. Ed Morrison and another two dozen cowboys rode into Dodge and shot up the town, galloping down Front Street. They entered the Long Branch Saloon, vandalized, and harassed the customers. Hearing the commotion, Wyatt burst through the front door to find numerous guns pointing at him; another version of the story has it that only 3-5 cowboys were there. In both versions, Doc was playing cards in the back, and he put his pistol to Morrison's head, forcing him and his men to disarm. Wyatt credited Doc with saving his life that day, and the two became lifelong friends.

=== George Hoyt shooting ===
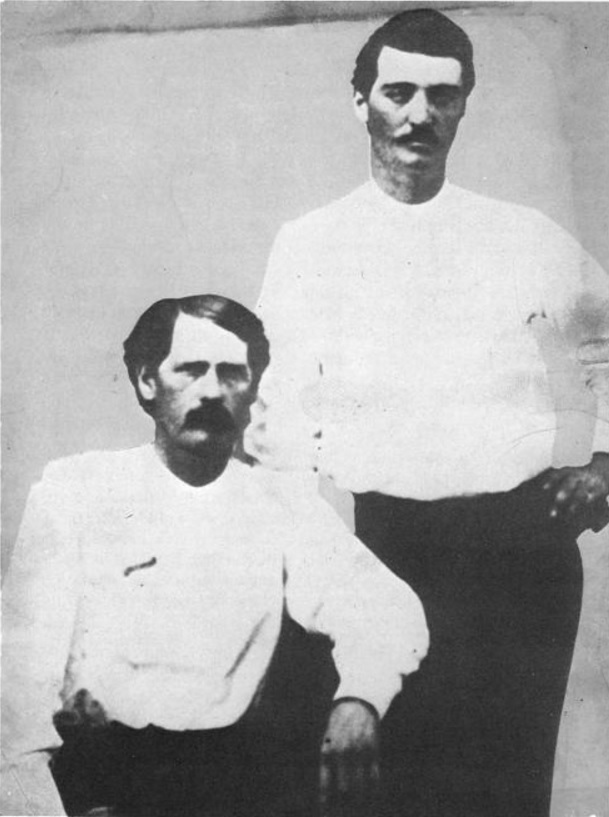
Deputies Bat Masterson (standing) and Wyatt Earp in Dodge City, 1876. The scroll on Earp's chest is a cloth pin-on badge

George Hoyt (spelled sometimes "Hoy") and other drunken cowboys shot their guns wildly around 3:00 am on July 26, 1878, including three shots into Dodge City's Comique Theater, causing comedian Eddie Foy, Sr. to throw himself to the stage floor in the middle of his act. Fortunately, no one was injured. Assistant Marshal Wyatt Earp and policeman Bat Masterson responded, along with several citizens, and opened fire with their pistols at the fleeing horsemen. The riders crossed the Arkansas River bridge south of town, but Hoyt fell from his horse, wounded in the arm or leg. Wyatt later told biographer Stuart Lake that he saw Hoyt through his gun sights, illuminated against the morning horizon, and he fired a fatal shot that killed him that day; but the Dodge City Times reported that Hoyt developed gangrene and died on August 21 after his leg was amputated.

== Move to Tombstone, Arizona ==
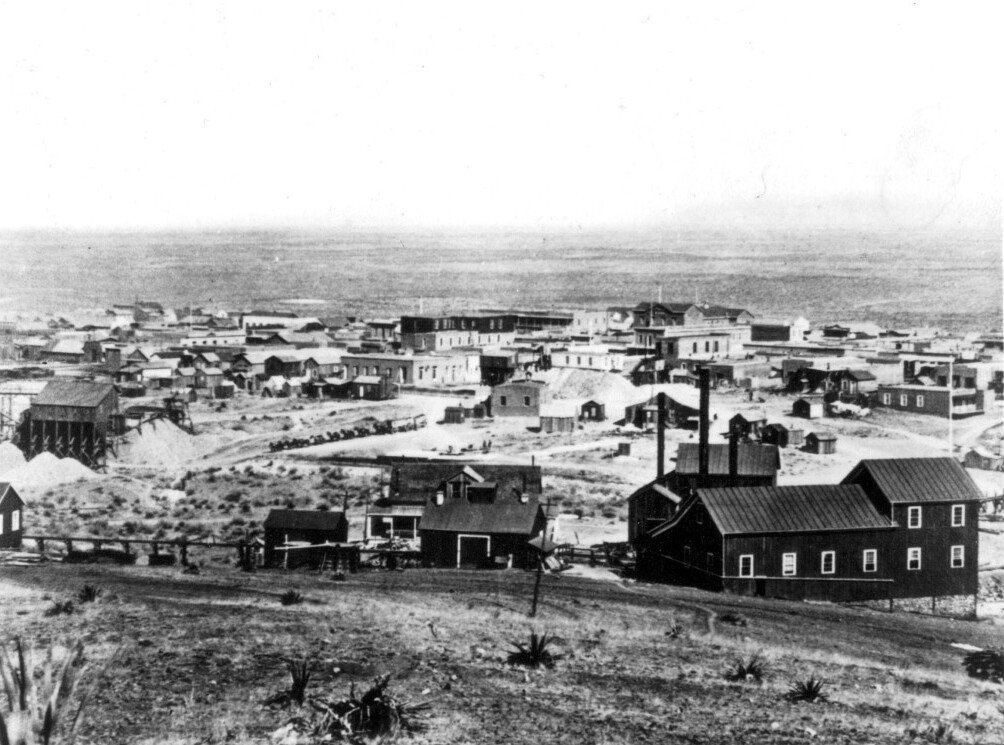
Tombstone in 1881

Dodge City had been a frontier cowtown for several years, but by 1879, it had begun to settle down. Virgil Earp was the town constable in Prescott, Arizona Territory, and he wrote to Wyatt about the opportunities in the silver-mining boomtown of Tombstone. He later wrote, "In 1879 Dodge was beginning to lose much of the snap which had given it a charm to men of reckless blood, and I decided to move to Tombstone, which was just building up a reputation."

Wyatt resigned from the Dodge City police force on September 9, 1879, and traveled to Las Vegas, New Mexico Territory, with his common-law wife, Mattie, his brother, Jim, and Jim's wife, Bessie. There, they reunited with Doc Holliday and his wife, Big Nose Kate, and the six of them went on to Prescott. Virgil was appointed deputy U.S. marshal for the Tombstone mining district on November 27, 1879, three days before they left for Tombstone, by U.S. Marshal for the Arizona Territory Crawley P. Dake.

Virgil was to operate out of Tombstone, 280 miles (450 km) from Prescott. His territory included the entire southeast area of the Arizona Territory. Wyatt, Virgil, and James Earp traveled to Tombstone. Tombstone was founded on March 5, 1879, with about 100 people living in tents and a few shacks. The Earps arrived with their wives on December 1, 1879, while Doc Holliday remained in Prescott where the gambling afforded better opportunities.

Tombstone had already grown to about 1,000 residents. Wyatt brought horses and a buckboard wagon, which he planned to convert into a stagecoach, but he found two established stage lines already running. He later said that he made most of his money in Tombstone as a professional gambler. The three Earps and Robert J. Winders filed a location notice on December 6, 1879, for the First North Extension of the Mountain Maid Mine. They also bought an interest in the Vizina mine and some water rights.

Jim worked as a barkeep, but none of their other business interests proved fruitful. Wyatt was hired in April or May 1880 by Wells Fargo agent Fred J. Dodge as a shotgun messenger on stagecoaches when they transported Wells Fargo strongboxes. In late July 1880, his younger brother Morgan arrived, leaving his wife Lou in Temescal, California (near San Bernardino). Warren Earp moved to Tombstone, and Doc Holliday arrived from Prescott in September with $40,000 (equivalent to $1,334,000 in 2025) in gambling winnings in his pocket.

=== First confrontation with the outlaw Cowboys ===
On July 25, 1880, Army Captain Joseph H. Hurst asked Deputy U.S. Marshal Virgil Earp to assist him in tracking outlaw Cowboys who had stolen six Army mules from Fort Rucker, Arizona. Virgil requested the assistance of his brothers Wyatt and Morgan, along with Wells Fargo agent Marshall Williams, and they found the mules at the McLaurys' ranch. McLaury was a 'Cowboy,' a term in that region that generally referred to a loose association of outlaws, some of whom were landowners and ranchers. Legitimate cowmen were referred to as cattle herders or ranchers. They found a branding iron that the Cowboys had used to change the "U.S." brand into "D.8."

Cowboy Frank Patterson made an agreement with Captain Hurst, and Hurst persuaded the posse to withdraw, with the understanding that the mules would be returned. The Cowboys showed up two days later without the mules and laughed at Hurst and the Earps. In response, Hurst printed a handbill describing the theft, and he charged McLaury with hiding the mules. He also reproduced the handbill in The Tombstone Epitaph on July 30, 1880. McLaury angrily printed a response in the Cowboy-friendly Nuggett, calling Hurst "unmanly," "a coward, a vagabond, a rascal, and a malicious liar," and accusing him of stealing the mules himself. Hurst later cautioned the Earp brothers that the Cowboys had threatened their lives. Virgil reported that McLaury had accosted him and said, "If you ever again follow us as close as you did, then you will have to fight anyway." A month later, Wyatt ran into Frank and Tom McLaury in Charleston, and they told him that they would kill him if he ever followed them as he had done before.

=== Becomes deputy sheriff ===
County Sheriff Charles A. Shibell appointed Virgil Earp as deputy sheriff for the eastern part of Pima County, Arizona, on July 28, 1880, which included Tombstone. The sheriff's position was worth more than $40,000 (equivalent to $1,334,000 in 2025) per year, because he was also county assessor and tax collector, and the board of supervisors allowed him to keep ten percent of the amounts paid. Former Democrat state legislator Johnny Behan, a future rival of Wyatt's, arrived in September 1880. Wyatt, appointed a deputy by his brother, then passed his Wells Fargo job as shotgun messenger to his brother Morgan. Wyatt did his job well, and his name was mentioned nearly every week from August through November in The Tombstone Epitaph or the Nugget newspapers.

=== Town marshal shot ===
On October 28, 1880, Tombstone town marshal Fred White attempted to break up a group of five late-night drunken revelers shooting at the moon on Allen Street. Deputy Sheriff Virgil Earp was in Owens Saloon a block away, though unarmed. Morgan and Fred Dodge were in a cabin nearby. Wyatt heard the shooting and ran to the scene. He borrowed a pistol from Fred Dodge and went to assist White. As he approached White, he saw White attempt to disarm Curly Bill Brocius, whose gun discharged, striking White in the groin. Throughout the shooting, Earp was standing by a chimney that was struck repeatedly by gunfire. He pistol-whipped Brocius, knocking him to the ground, then grabbed Brocius by the collar and told him to get up. Brocius asked, "What have I done?" Fred Dodge recalled in a letter he wrote to Stuart Lake in 1928 what he had witnessed:

Wyatt's coolness and nerve never showed to better advantage than they did that night. When Morg and I reached him, Wyatt was squatted on his heels beside Curly Bill and Fred White. Curly Bill's friends were pot-shooting at him in the dark. The shooting was lively and slugs were hitting the chimney and cabin ... in all of that racket, Wyatt's voice was even and quiet as usual.

Earp altered his story later on, telling John H. Flood Jr. that he did not see Brocius's pistol on the ground in the dark until afterward. The pistol contained one expended cartridge and five live rounds.

Brocius waived a preliminary hearing so that his case could be transferred to Tucson District Court, and Virgil and Wyatt escorted him to Tucson to stand trial – possibly saving him from a lynching. White, age 31, died of his wound two days after his shooting. On December 27, 1880, Earp testified that White's shooting was accidental. Brocius expressed regret, saying that he had not intended to shoot White. Gunsmith Jacob Gruber testified that Brocius's single-action revolver was defective, allowing it to be discharged at half-cock. A statement was introduced that White had made, stating that the shooting was accidental. The judge agreed and released Brocius. Brocius, however, remained intensely angry about how Earp had pistol-whipped him and became an enemy of the Earps.

=== Shibell election ===
On November 2, 1880, the Democratic incumbent Charles Shibell ran for re-election as county sheriff against Republican challenger Robert H. Paul. Initially, Shibell was declared the winner by a margin of 58 votes under suspicious circumstances. James C. Hancock reported that Cowboys Curly Bill Brocius and Johnny Ringo had served as election officials in San Simon Precinct, although biographer David Johnson places Ringo in New Mexico with Ike Clanton on November 1, the day before the election.

Curly Bill had been arrested and jailed in Tucson on October 28 for shooting Marshal White, and he was still there on election day. The home of John Magill was used as the polling place. The precinct contained only about 10 eligible voters (another source says 50), but the Cowboys gathered non-voters, such as children and Chinese, and had them cast ballots. They then gave names to all the dogs, donkeys, and poultry, and cast ballots in their names for Shibell. Precinct 27 in the San Simon Valley in northern Cochise County turned out 104 votes, 103 of them for Shibell. The election board met on November 14 and declared Shibell the winner.

Paul filed a lawsuit on November 19 contesting the election results, alleging that Shibell's Cowboy supporters, Ike Clanton, Curly Bill Brocius, and Frank McLaury, had conspired in ballot stuffing. In late January 1881 Chief Justice of Arizona C. G. W. French ruled in Paul's favor, but Shibell appealed. A recount found that Paul had 402 votes and Shibell had 354. In April 1881, the election commission found that a mysterious "Henry Johnson" was responsible for certifying the ballots. This turned out to be the same James K. Johnson who had been shooting up Allen Street on the night when Marshal White was killed. Moreover, he had testified at Curly Bill's preliminary hearing after he had shot Fred White. Johnson later testified in the election hearing and said that the ballots had been left in the care of Ike Clanton's brother Phineas. None of the witnesses during the election hearing reported any ballots being cast by dogs.

Paul was declared the winner of the Pima County sheriff election. However, the election was a moot point by then, as Paul could not replace Behan with Earp because Cochise County was created out of the eastern portion of Pima County on January 1, 1881.

=== Earp loses reappointment ===
Earp served as deputy sheriff for eastern Pima County for only three months. The region was strongly Republican and Bob Paul had been expected to defeat Shibell. Earp was a Republican and believed that he would continue in the job. Given how fast eastern Pima County was growing, many expected it would soon be split off into its own county, with Tombstone as its seat; Earp hoped to win the job as the new county sheriff and continue receiving 10% of all tax money collected. Southern Pacific was the major landholder, so tax collection was a relatively easy process. In 1882, the Cochise County sheriff earned $24,010.52 (equivalent to $801,000 in 2025) in fees.

Earp resigned from the sheriff's office on November 9, 1880, and Shibell immediately appointed Johnny Behan as the new deputy sheriff for eastern Pima County. Behan had considerably more political experience than Earp, as he had served as Yavapai County sheriff from 1871 to 1873. He had been elected to the Arizona Territorial Legislature twice, representing Yavapai County in the 7th Territorial Legislature in 1873 and Mohave County in the 10th in 1879. Behan moved to the northwest Arizona Territory, where he served as the Mohave County recorder in 1877 and then deputy sheriff of Mohave County at Gillet in 1879.

=== Behan wins election ===
Earp and Behan applied for the new position of Cochise County sheriff, which paid the office holder 10% of the fees and taxes collected, as did the Pima County sheriff's job. Earp thought that he had a good chance to win because he was the former undersheriff in the region and a Republican, like Arizona Territorial Governor John C. Fremont. However, Behan had greater political experience and influence in Prescott.

Earp later testified at the O.K. Corral hearing that he and Behan had made a deal. He said that Behan and he agreed that, if Earp withdrew his application, Behan would appoint him as undersheriff. Behan received the appointment in February 1881, but he did not keep his end of the bargain and instead chose Harry Woods as undersheriff, who was a prominent Democrat. Behan testified at first that he had not made any deal with Earp, but later admitted he had lied. He said that he broke his promise to Earp because of an incident which occurred shortly before his appointment when Earp learned that Ike and Billy Clanton had one of his prize horses, which had been stolen more than a year before.

Earp and Holliday rode to the Clanton ranch near Charleston to recover the horse and overtook Behan along the way, who was riding in a wagon. Behan also was heading to the ranch to serve an electioneering subpoena on Ike Clanton. Accounts differ as to what happened next, but Earp testified that Billy Clanton gave up the horse when Earp arrived at the ranch, even before being presented with ownership papers. According to Behan's testimony, however, Earp had told the Clantons that Behan was on his way to arrest them for horse theft. The incident embarrassed the Clantons and Behan, and Behan later testified that he did not want to work with Earp and chose Woods instead.

=== Relationship with Sadie Marcus ===
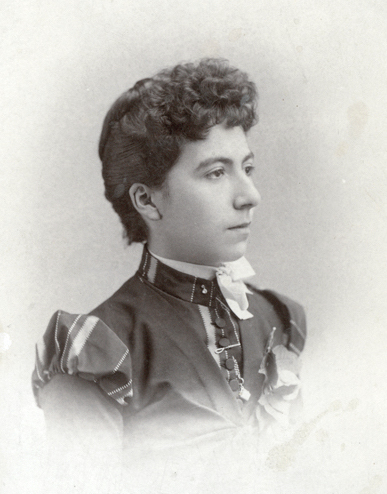
A possible image of Josephine Sarah Marcus, who left a relationship with Johnny Behan and took up with Wyatt Earp

Later in life, Josephine Sarah Marcus aggressively protected hers and Wyatt's privacy while in Tombstone. Marcus deliberately remained vague about this period, prompting modern researchers to question what she was hiding. She said that she first visited Tombstone as part of the Pauline Markham Theater Troupe on December 1, 1879, for a one-week engagement, but modern researchers have not found any record that she was ever part of the theater company. The many contradictions in her story have led to considerable speculation about her past.

Researchers have identified two women with similar names in the same region of the Arizona Territory whose lives bear many striking parallels. Sadie Mansfield and Sadie Marcus both made a stagecoach journey from San Francisco to Prescott, Arizona Territory; both traveled with a black woman named Julia; both were sexual partners with Behan; both were 19 years old, born in New York City, and had parents from Prussia. The only difference noted in the 1880 census is in their occupations: the Sadie who lived in San Francisco is listed as "At home", while the Sadie in Tip Top is recorded as a "Courtesan". Marcus said that her parents hid her activities, and they may have been covering for her when the census taker was a neighbor who knew the family.

Behan owned a saloon in Tip Top, Arizona, where he maintained a prostitute named Sadie Mansfield, and he moved to Tombstone in September 1880. "Sadie" was a popular nickname for "Sarah", and prostitutes commonly changed their first names. Sadie Mansfield, the Tip Top prostitute, may have returned to San Francisco and then rejoined Behan in Tombstone in September 1880 as Sadie Marcus, where they continued their relationship.

In early 1881, Sadie found Behan in bed with the wife of a friend and kicked him out, although she still used the Behan surname through mid-year. Wyatt was in a relationship with Mattie Blaylock, a former prostitute. Earp named a mining claim he filed on February 16, 1880 "Mattie Blaylock". Modern researchers have found Blaylock listed as Earp's wife in the June 1880 census. She suffered from severe headaches and became addicted to laudanum, a commonly used opiate and painkiller, and later committed suicide. When Marcus learned that Stuart Lake had discovered the existence of Blaylock, she successfully demanded that he omit her from his book I Married Wyatt Earp.

After Marcus arrived in Tombstone with Behan, Earp apparently developed an interest in her, although there are no records in Tombstone of a relationship between them. Tombstone diarist George W. Parsons never mentioned seeing Wyatt and Sadie together, and neither did John Clum in his memoirs. But Earp and Marcus certainly knew each other, as Behan and Earp had offices above the Crystal Palace Saloon.

In April 1882, shortly after he left Tombstone, there is evidence that Earp had developed feelings for Marcus. The Earp posse, by that time on their vendetta ride, arrived in Albuquerque, New Mexico, intending to stay for two weeks. Wyatt and Holliday had been fast friends since Holliday saved Earp's life in Dodge City three years prior. Wyatt was staying with prominent businessman Henry N. Jaffa, who was also president of the local board of trade, and first Mayor of Albuquerque. Like Marcus, Jaffa was Jewish.

During their stay in Albuquerque, Earp and Holliday ate at the Retreat Restaurant owned by "Fat Charlie". Former New Mexico Territory Governor Miguel Otero wrote in 1940 that "Holliday said something about Earp becoming 'a damn Jew-boy'. Earp became angry and left. [Henry] Jaffa told me later that Earp's woman was a Jewess. Earp did mezuzah when entering the house." The Albuquerque Evening Review reported that Doc Holliday "became intoxicated and indiscreet in his remarks, which offended Wyatt and caused the party to break up, Holliday going with Tipton."

Earp's anger at Holliday's ethnic slur may indicate that his feelings for Marcus were more serious at the time than is commonly known. The information in the letter is compelling because, at that time in the 1940s, the possibility of a prior relationship between Wyatt Earp and Josephine Marcus while in Tombstone was unknown. Otero could know these things only if he had a relationship with someone who had personal knowledge of the people involved.

Marcus went to great lengths to sanitize her own and Wyatt's history. For example, as mentioned, she worked hard to keep her name and the name of Wyatt's second wife, Mattie, out of Stuart Lake's 1931 book, Wyatt Earp: Frontier Marshal, and Marcus threatened litigation to keep it that way. Marcus also told Earp's biographers and others that Earp never drank, did not own gambling saloons, and that he never provided prostitutes to customers, although strong evidence to the contrary exists.

=== Interest in mining and gambling ===
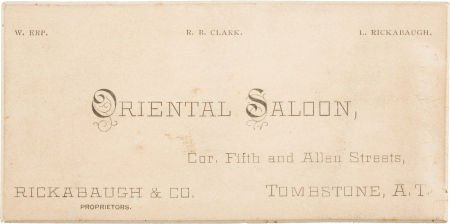
Business card for Tombstone's Oriental Saloon with the names of "W. Erp", "R. B. Clark", and "L. Rickenbaugh"

Losing the undersheriff position left Earp without a job in Tombstone; however, he and his brothers were beginning to make some money on their mining claims in the area. In January 1881, Oriental Saloon owner Milt Joyce gave Earp a quarter-interest in the faro concession at the Oriental Saloon in exchange for his services as a manager and enforcer. Gambling was regarded as a legitimate profession at the time. Earp invited his friend Bat Masterson to Tombstone to help him run the faro tables in the saloon, and he telegraphed Luke Short in June 1881 to offer him a job as a faro dealer. Masterson remained until April 1881, when he returned to Dodge City to assist his brother Jim.

On October 8, 1881, Doc Holliday got into a dispute with Cowboy and outlaw John Tyler in the Oriental Saloon. A rival gambling concession operator hired someone to disrupt Wyatt's business. When Tyler started a fight after losing a bet, Wyatt threw him out of the saloon. Holliday later wounded Oriental owners Milt Joyce and his partner, William Parker, and was convicted of assault.

=== Facing down a lynch mob ===
Michael O'Rourke killed Henry Schneider, chief engineer of the Tombstone Mining and Milling Company, and said that it was in self-defense. Schneider was well-liked, and a mob of miners quickly gathered and threatened to lynch O'Rourke on the spot. Lake's biography describes Earp single-handedly dispersing the mob, but the Epitaph gave primary credit to Ben Sippy for calming the crowd, assisted by Virgil Earp, Wyatt Earp and Johnny Behan. Nevertheless, Lake's account added to Earp's modern legend as a lawman.

=== Stagecoach robbers kill two ===
Tensions increased between the Earps and both the Clantons and McLaurys through 1881. Three Cowboys attempted to rob a Kinnear & Company stagecoach on March 15, 1881, at 10:00 pm, which was reportedly carrying $26,000 (equivalent to $867,000 in 2025) in silver bullion. The amount of bullion that the stagecoach actually carried is questioned by modern researchers because it would have weighed about 1,600 pounds (730 kg); the value of silver at the time was $1 an ounce – a significant weight for a team of horses. According to Wells Fargo agent John Q. Jackson, a stagecoach typically carried an Express Box containing bullion weighing only 100 to 150 pounds (45 to 68 kg).

The holdup took place near Benson, during which the robbers killed driver Eli "Budd" Philpot and passenger Peter Roerig. The Earps and a posse tracked the men down and arrested Luther King, who confessed that he had been holding the reins while Bill Leonard, Harry "The Kid" Head, and Jim Crain robbed the stage. They arrested King, and Sheriff Johnny Behan escorted him to jail, but somehow King walked in through the front door and out the back.

During the hearing into the gunfight at the O.K. Corral, Wyatt testified that he offered Ike Clanton and Frank McLaury the $3,600 in Wells Fargo reward money ($1,200 per robber) in return for information about the identities of the three robbers. He testified that he had other motives for his plan; he hoped that arresting the murderers would boost his chances for election as Cochise County sheriff. He told the court that he had taken the extra step of obtaining a second copy of a telegram for Clanton from Wells Fargo, ensuring that the reward applied for capturing the killers dead or alive. According to testimony given by Wyatt and Virgil, both McLaury and Clanton agreed to provide information to assist in capturing Leonard, Head, and Crain, but they never had a chance to fulfill the agreement. All three suspects were killed when attempting other robberies.

In his testimony at the court hearing, Clanton said that Earp did not want to capture the men but to kill them. He told the court that Earp wanted to conceal his family's involvement in the Benson stage robbery and had sworn him to secrecy, and that Morgan Earp had confided in him that he and Wyatt had "piped off $1,400 to Doc Holliday and Bill Leonard", who were supposed to be on the stage the night when Bud Philpot was killed. Clanton told the court, "I was not going to have anything to do with helping to capture ..." and then he corrected himself "... kill Bill Leonard, Crane, and Harry Head." Clanton denied having any knowledge of the Wells Fargo telegram confirming the reward money.

=== September stagecoach robbery ===
Meanwhile, tensions increased between the Earps and the McLaurys when Cowboys robbed the passenger stage on the Sandy Bob Line in the Tombstone area on September 8, bound for nearby Bisbee, Arizona. The masked robbers robbed the passengers and the strongbox, but they were recognized by their voices and language. They were identified as Deputy Sheriff Pete Spence (an alias for Elliot Larkin Ferguson) and Deputy Sheriff Frank Stilwell, a business partner of Spence's. Stilwell was fired a short while later as a deputy sheriff for Sheriff Behan (for county tax "accounting irregularities").

Wyatt and Virgil Earp rode with the sheriff's posse to track the stage robbers, and Wyatt discovered an unusual boot heel print in the mud. The posse checked with a shoemaker in Bisbee and found a matching heel that he had just removed from Stilwell's boot. A further check of a Bisbee corral turned up both Spence and Stilwell, who were arrested by sheriff's deputies Billy Breakenridge and Nagel.

Spence and Stilwell were arraigned on the robbery charges before Justice Wells Spicer, who set their bail at $7,000 each. They were released after paying the bail, but they were rearrested by Virgil for the Bisbee robbery a month later, on October 13, on the new federal charge of interfering with a mail carrier. The newspapers, however, reported that they had been arrested for a different stage robbery which occurred on October 8 near Contention City, Arizona, less than two weeks before the O.K. Corral shootout, and this final incident may have been misunderstood by the McLaurys. Wyatt and Virgil were still out of town for the Spence and Stilwell hearing when Frank McLaury confronted Morgan Earp, telling him that the McLaurys would kill the Earps if they tried to arrest Spence, Stilwell, or the McLaurys again.

== Gunfight at the O.K. Corral ==
The tension came to a head between the Earps and the Cowboys on Wednesday, October 26, 1881. Ike Clanton, Billy Claiborne, and other Cowboys had been threatening to kill the Earps for several weeks, and Tombstone City Marshal Virgil Earp learned that they were armed and had gathered near the O.K. Corral. He asked Wyatt, Morgan Earp, and Doc Holliday to assist him, as he intended to disarm them. Wyatt had been deputized by Virgil a few days prior as a temporary assistant marshal, and Morgan was a deputy city marshal.

Around 3:00 p.m., the Earps and Holliday headed towards Fremont Street, where the Cowboys had been gathering. They found five Cowboys in a vacant lot adjacent to the O.K. Corral's rear entrance on Fremont Street. The lot was narrow between the Harwood House and Fly's Boarding House and Photography Studio; the two parties were initially only about 6 to 10 feet (1.8 to 3.0 m) apart. Ike Clanton and Billy Claiborne fled, but Tom and Frank McLaury and Billy Clanton stood their ground and were killed. Morgan was clipped by a shot across his back that nicked both shoulder blades and a vertebra. Virgil was shot through the calf, and Holliday was grazed by a bullet. Wyatt came through the shootout unharmed.

== Charged with murder ==
Ike Clanton filed murder charges against the Earps and Holliday on October 30. Justice Wells Spicer convened a preliminary hearing on October 31 to determine whether enough evidence existed to go to trial. In an unusual proceeding, he took written and oral testimony from about thirty witnesses over more than a month. Sheriff Behan testified that the Cowboys had not resisted but had thrown up their hands and turned out their coats to show that they were not armed. He said that Tom McLaury threw open his coat to show that he was not armed and that the first two shots were fired by the Earp party. Behan insisted that Holliday had fired first using a nickel-plated revolver, although other witnesses reported seeing him carrying a messenger shotgun immediately beforehand.

The Earps hired experienced trial lawyer Thomas Fitch as defense counsel. Since Virgil was confined to bed due to his wounds, Wyatt testified in a written statement that he drew his gun only after Clanton and McLaury went for their pistols. He detailed the Earps' previous troubles with the Clantons and McLaurys and explained that they had intended to disarm the Cowboys and that his party had fired in self-defense. Fitch produced contradictory testimony from prosecution witnesses during cross-examination, during which they appeared to dodge his questions or said that they could not remember.

Justice Spicer ruled on November 30 that there was not enough evidence to indict the men. He said that the evidence indicated that the Earps and Holliday acted within the law and that Virgil had deputized Holliday and Wyatt. The Earps and Holliday were free, but their reputations had been tarnished. The Cowboys in Tombstone looked upon the Earps as robbers and murderers and plotted revenge.

=== Cowboys' revenge ===
Virgil was ambushed on December 28 while walking between saloons on Allen Street in Tombstone, and he was maimed by a shotgun blast that struck his left arm and shoulder. Ike Clanton's hat was found in the back of the building across Allen Street from where the shots were fired. Wyatt wired U.S. Marshal Crawley P. Dake, asking to be appointed as a deputy U.S. marshal with authority to select his own deputies. Dake granted the request in late January and provided the Earps with some funds that he borrowed from Wells Fargo, variously reported as between $500 and $3,000.

In mid-January, Earp's ally Rickabaugh sold the Oriental Saloon to Earp's adversary Milt Joyce, and Wyatt sold his gambling concessions at the hotel. The Earps also raised some funds from sympathetic business owners in town. Wyatt and Virgil submitted their resignations to Dake on February 2, 1882, being tired of the criticism leveled against them, but Dake refused to accept them because their accounts had not been settled. That same day, Wyatt sent a message to Ike Clanton that he wanted to reconcile their differences, which Clanton refused.

Also that day, Clanton was acquitted of the charges against him in the shooting of Virgil. The defense brought in seven witnesses who testified that Clanton was in Charleston at the time of the shooting. The Earps needed more funds to pay for the extra deputies and associated expenses, as contributions from supportive business owners were not enough. On February 13, Wyatt mortgaged his home to lawyer James G. Howard for $365 (equivalent to $12,000 in 2025); he was never able to repay the loan, and Howard foreclosed on the house in 1884.

Morgan Earp was murdered on March 18 while playing billiards, shot by gunmen firing from a dark alley through a door window into the billiard room. He was struck in the right side; the bullet shattered his spine, passed through his left side, and lodged in the thigh of George A. B. Berry, while another round narrowly missed him. A doctor was summoned, and Morgan was moved from the floor to a nearby couch, while the murderers escaped in the dark. He died 40 minutes later. Wyatt felt that he could not rely on civil justice and decided to take matters into his own hands and kill the murderers himself.

== Earp vendetta ride ==
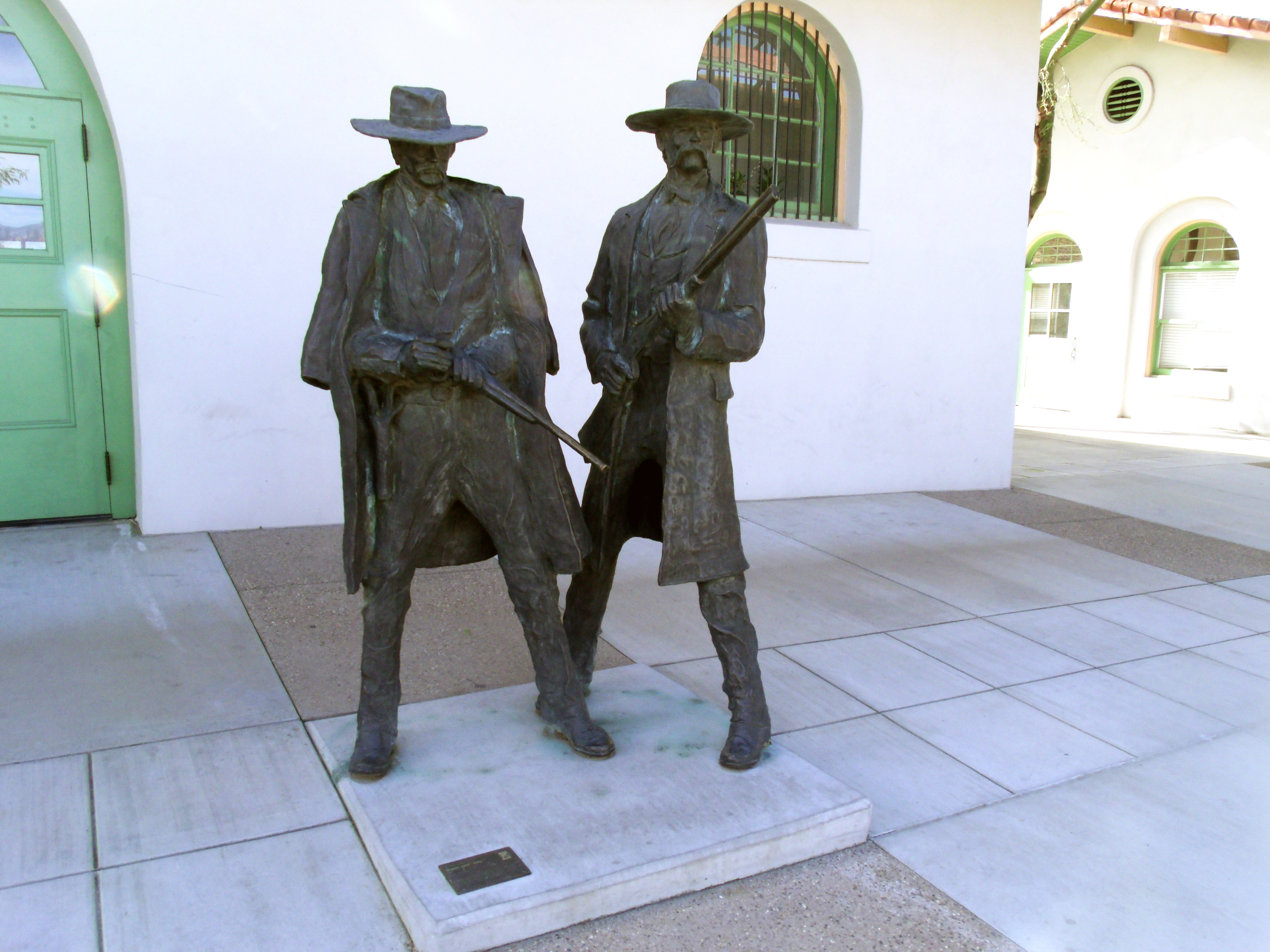
This statue built on March 25, 2005, depicts Earp and Holliday on the location of the 1880s Tucson Depot where Frank Stilwell was killed by Earp. It is now part of the Amtrak Station.

The day after Morgan's murder, Deputy U.S. Marshal Wyatt Earp formed a posse made up of his brothers James and Warren, Doc Holliday, Sherman McMaster, Jack "Turkey Creek" Johnson, Charles "Hairlip Charlie" Smith, Dan Tipton, and Texas Jack Vermillion to protect the family and pursue the suspects, paying them $5 a day. They took Morgan's body to the railhead in Benson, and James accompanied it to the family home in Colton, California, where Morgan's wife and parents waited to bury him. The posse guarded Virgil and Allie to Tucson, where they had heard that Frank Stilwell and other Cowboys were waiting to kill Virgil. The next morning, Frank Stilwell's body was found alongside the tracks, with a shotgun bullet in his chest. The coroner's jury returned a verdict that Stilwell was one of Morgan's assassins, "if not the principal one." Pete Spence was arrested in connection with the killing; a man mentioned in the coroner's report as Friese was arrested by Deputy Sheriff Hereford and gave his name as Frederick Bode. Public feeling in Tombstone rapidly shifted to sympathy for the Earps following the verdict. Even the Tombstone Nugget, generally sympathetic to the Cowboys, condemned both killings in equal terms, calling Morgan's murder and Stilwell's assassination "two of the foulest, ghoul-like assassinations that ever disgraced any community" and placing Stilwell's killers "in the same category as the skulking murderers of Earp." Wyatt and 5 other federal lawmen were indicted for murdering him, and Tucson Justice of the Peace Charles Meyer issued warrants for their arrest.

The Earp posse briefly returned to Tombstone, where Sheriff Behan tried to stop them, but was brushed aside. The case of the Territory against D.G. Tipton and O.C. Smith, friends of the Earp brothers arrested for resisting officers and conspiracy after departing Tombstone with the posse, was dismissed by Justice Felter, who ruled that Behan had no legal process at the time of his attempt to arrest the Earp party. Hairlip Charlie and Warren remained in Tombstone, and the rest set out for Pete Spence's wood camp in the Dragoon Mountains. Spence was absent, but they found and killed Florentino "Indian Charlie" Cruz. Two days later, they stumbled onto the wood camp of William Brocius, Pony Diehl, and other outlaw Cowboys near Iron Springs in the Whetstone Mountains. According to reports from both sides, the two sides immediately exchanged gunfire. The Earp party withdrew to find protection from the heavy gunfire, except for Wyatt and Texas Jack Vermillion, whose horse was shot.

Curly Bill fired at Wyatt with a shotgun but missed. 18 months earlier, Wyatt had protected Curly Bill against a lynch mob; he also provided testimony that helped spare Curly Bill a murder trial for killing Marshal Fred White. Wyatt returned Curly Bill's gunfire with his own shotgun, hitting him in the chest from about 50 feet (15m) away, causing him to fall into the water's edge of the spring and die. Wyatt then fired his revolver, mortally wounding Johnny Barnes in the chest and wounding Milt Hicks in the arm. Vermillion tried to retrieve his rifle that was wedged in the scabbard under his fallen horse, exposing himself to the Cowboys' gunfire, but Holliday helped him get to cover.

Earp told biographer Stuart Lake that both sides of his long coat were shot through, and another bullet struck his boot heel. Ed Colburn, in a letter published in the Ford County Globe on May 23, 1882, wrote that he'd visited with the brothers Earp in Gunnison, Colorado. He relayed Earp's story about how his overcoat was hit on both sides of his body by a charge of buckshot and that his saddle horn was shot off. John Flood wrote:

"The saddle-horn had been splintered, his coat hung in shreds, there were three holes through the legs of his trousers, five holes through the crown of his sombrero, and three through the brim."

Earp was finally able to get on his horse and retreat with the rest of the posse. Some modern researchers have found that, by this time, most saddlehorns were made of steel, not wood. Earp told several versions of the story in which he had trouble remounting his horse because his cartridge belt had slipped down his legs. He was never wounded in any of his confrontations, which added to his mystique.

The posse left the Cowboys behind and rode north to the Percy Ranch, but they weren't welcomed by Hugh and Jim Percy, who feared the Cowboys; they left around 3:00 am on March 27 after a meal and some rest. They arrived near Tombstone and met with supporters, including Hairlip Charlie and Warren Earp. That same day, the posse arrived at the Sierra Bonita Ranch owned by Henry Hooker, a wealthy and prominent rancher. That night, Dan Tipton caught the stagecoach out of Tombstone and headed for Benson, carrying $1,000 from mining owner and Earp supporter E. B. Gage for the posse. Hooker congratulated Earp on killing Curly Bill, and Wyatt told him that he wanted to buy new mounts. Hooker was known for his purebred stallions and ran more than 500 brood mares, which produced horses renowned for their speed, beauty, and temperament. He provided Wyatt and his posse with new mounts but refused to take their money. Behan's posse was then observed in the distance, and Hooker suggested that Earp make his stand there, but Earp moved into the hills about three miles (5 km) distant near Reilly Hill. Earp's posse wasn't found by the local posse, led by Cochise County Sheriff John Behan, although Behan's party trailed them for many miles. Behan and a posse of sixteen men had pursued the Earp party as far as the Dragoon Mountains before turning back, reporting they had followed the trail to within three miles of town where it was covered by surrounding travel. In the middle of April 1882, the Earp posse left the Arizona Territory and headed east into the New Mexico Territory, then into Colorado.

The coroner reports credited the Earp posse with killing Frank Stilwell, Curly Bill, Indian Charlie, and Johnny Barnes in their two-week-long ride. In 1888, Earp gave an interview to California historian Hubert Howe Bancroft, during which he claimed to have killed "over a dozen stage robbers, murderers, and cattle thieves" in his time as a lawman.

== Life after Tombstone ==
The gunfight in Tombstone lasted only 30 seconds, but it ended up defining Earp for the rest of his life. His movements began to receive national press coverage after he killed Frank Stilwell in Tucson, and he left Arizona with his brother Warren, Holliday, McMaster, "Turkey Creek" Jack Johnson, and Texas Jack Vermillion. They stopped in Albuquerque, New Mexico where they met up with Earp's friend Deputy U.S. Marshal Bat Masterson. Masterson went with them to Trinidad, Colorado, where he opened a faro game in a saloon and later became marshal.

Earp dealt faro at Masterson's saloon for several weeks, then left for Gunnison, Colorado in May 1882 with McMaster, Vermillion, and Warren Earp. The Earps and Texas Jack set up camp on the outskirts of Gunnison, where they remained quietly at first, rarely going into town for supplies. They reportedly pulled a "gold brick scam" in Gunnison on a German visitor named Ritchie by trying to sell him gold-painted rocks for $2,000. Earp and Holliday had a serious disagreement when Holliday accused him of becoming "a damn Jew-boy", and they parted ways in Albuquerque.

Holliday and Earp met again in June 1882 in Gunnison after Earp intervened to keep his friend from being arrested on murder charges which they all had pending against them for killing Frank Stillwell in Tucson. Earp saw Holliday for a final time in the late winter of 1886, where they met in the lobby of the Windsor Hotel. Josephine Marcus described the skeletal Holliday as having a continuous cough and standing on "unsteady legs".

The San Diego Union printed a report from the San Francisco Call on July 9, 1882, that Virgil Earp was in San Francisco receiving treatment for his shattered arm, and that Wyatt was expected to arrive from Colorado that day. Wyatt took a job managing a horse stable in Santa Rosa. Earp developed a reputation as a sportsman and gambler. He was reputed to own a six-horse stable in San Francisco, although it was learned later that the horses were leased.

Following Wyatt's return to San Francisco, Josephine began using the name "Josephine Earp". Josephine was Earp's common-law wife for 46 years until his death. Wyatt and Josie remained in San Francisco for about nine months until early 1883, when they left for Silverton, Colorado, where silver and gold mining were flourishing. It was the first of many mining camps and boomtowns in which they lived. He still owned a house in Tombstone with his former common-law wife, Mattie, who had waited for him in Colton, where his parents and Virgil were living.

In mid-1882, she sent him a letter saying that she wanted a divorce. She had met a gambler from Arizona, and he had asked her to marry him. Earp did not believe in divorce and therefore refused, but she ran away with the gambler anyway. The gambler abandoned her in Arizona, so she moved to Pinal City, Arizona, where she resumed life as a prostitute. She struggled with addictions and committed suicide by opium poisoning on July 3, 1888, at age 37–38.

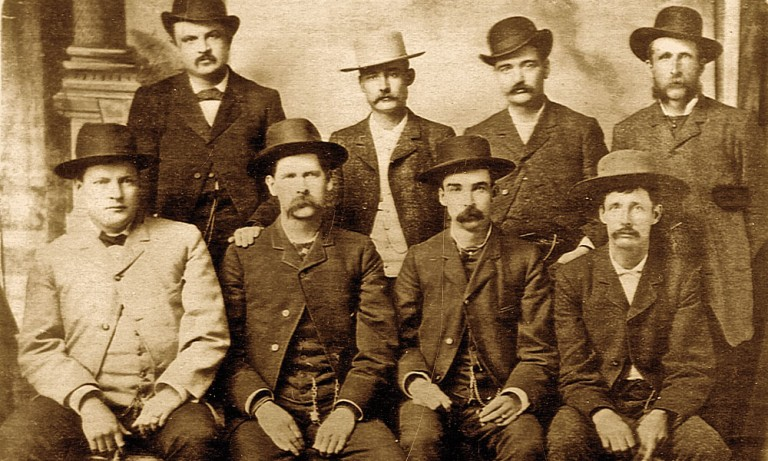
The "Dodge City Peace Commission", June 10, 1883. Standing: William H. Harris, Luke Short, Bat Masterson, William F. Petillon. Seated: Charlie Bassett, Wyatt Earp, Michael Francis "Frank" McLean, and Cornelius "Neil" Brown

Earp's friend Luke Short was part-owner of the Long Branch saloon in Dodge City, but the mayor tried to run him out of business and out of town during the Dodge City War. Short appealed to Masterson, and Masterson contacted Earp on May 31, 1883. Earp and Josephine went with Masterson, Johnny Millsap, Shotgun John Collins, Texas Jack Vermillion, and Johnny Green to Dodge City to help Short, and they were sworn in as deputies by constable Dave Marrow.

Governor George W. Glick arranged a 10-day cooling-off period to allow Short to sell the saloon, but Short, Earp, and the others refused to compromise. Seeking to avoid a confrontation with the deputized gunmen and under pressure from Governor Glick and the Santa Fe Railroad, which conducted much of its business in Dodge, the mayor and city council backed down. They allowed the gambling halls, dance halls, and saloons to reopen, including the Long Branch, and the so-called Dodge City War ended without a shot being fired.

=== Idaho mining venture ===
Earp arrived in Eagle City, Idaho, in 1884 along with Josephine, his brothers Warren and James, and James's wife Bessie. Eagle City was another new boomtown growing from the discovery of gold, silver, and lead in the Coeur d'Alene area; it is now a ghost town in Shoshone County, Idaho. Earp joined the crowd looking for gold in the Murray-Eagle mining district, and they paid $2,250 for a 50 feet (15 m) diameter white circus in which they opened a dance hall and saloon called The White Elephant.

Earp was named deputy sheriff in the area, including the newly incorporated Kootenai County, Idaho, which was disputing jurisdiction with Eagle City in Shoshone County. There were numerous disagreements over mining claims and property rights in which Earp was involved. On March 28, a miner named Bill Buzzard was constructing a building when Earp's partner, Jack Enright, tried to stop him. Enright claimed the building was on part of his property, and the two men began arguing. Buzzard fired several shots at Enright with his Winchester, then allies of both sides took defensive positions behind snowbanks and began shooting at one another. Earp and his brother James stepped into the middle of the fray and helped peacefully resolve the dispute before anyone was seriously hurt.

Around April 1885, Earp reportedly used his badge to join a band of claim jumpers in Embry Camp, later renamed Chewelah, Washington. Within six months, their substantial stake had run dry, and the Earps left the Murray-Eagle district. About 10 years later, a reporter hunted up Buzzard after the Fitzimmons-Sharkey fight and extracted a story from him that accused Earp of being the brains behind lot-jumping and real-estate fraud, further tarnishing his reputation.

=== California ===
The Coeur d'Alene mining venture died out by 1887, so Earp and Josephine went to San Diego, California, where the railroad was about to arrive and a real estate boom was underway. They stayed for about four years, living most of the time in the Brooklyn Hotel. Earp speculated in San Diego's booming real estate market, and he bought four saloons and gambling halls between 1887 and around 1896, all in the "respectable" part of town. They offered 21 games, including faro, blackjack, poker, keno, pedro, and monte.

At the height of the boom, he made up to $1,000 a night in profit. He also owned the Oyster Bar located in the first granite-faced building in San Diego, the four-story Louis Bank Building at 835 5th Avenue, one of the more popular saloons in the Stingaree district. One of the reasons it drew a good crowd was the Golden Poppy brothel upstairs, owned by Madam Cora. Each room was painted a different color, such as emerald green, summer yellow, or ruby red, and each prostitute was required to dress in matching garments.

Earp had a long-standing interest in boxing and horse racing, and he refereed boxing matches in San Diego, Tijuana, and San Bernardino. In the 1887 San Diego City Directory he was listed as a capitalist or gambler. He won a race horse named Otto Rex in a card game and began investing in race horses, and he also judged prize fights on both sides of the border; he was one of the judges at the county fair horse races held in Escondido, California, in 1889. The boom came to an end as rapidly as it had started, and the population of San Diego fell from a high of 40,000 in 1885 when Earp arrived to only 16,000 in 1890.

The Earps moved back to San Francisco in 1891 so that Josephine could be closer to half-sister Henrietta's family, and Earp developed a reputation as a sportsman and a gambler. He held on to his San Diego properties, but when their value fell, he could not pay the taxes and was forced to sell the lots. He continued to race horses, but he could no longer afford to own them by 1896, so he raced them on behalf of the owner of a horse stable in Santa Rosa, which he managed. In Santa Rosa, Earp personally competed in and won a harness race. From 1891 to 1897, the couple lived in at least four different locations in the city: 145 Ellis St., 720 McAllister St., 514A Seventh Ave., and 1004 Golden Gate Ave.

=== Later relationship with Josephine ===
Josephine wrote in her memoir that she and Earp were married in 1892 by the captain of multi-millionaire Lucky Baldwin's yacht off the California coast. Raymond Nez wrote that his grandparents witnessed their marriage, but no public record of the marriage has been found. Baldwin was a horse breeder and racer who also owned the Santa Anita race track in Los Angeles, which Earp frequented.

Earp's relationship with Josephine was tempestuous at times. She gambled to excess, and he had adulterous affairs. He knew that she preferred being called "Josephine" and detested "Sadie", but he had a mischievous sense of humor and began calling her Sadie early in their relationship. Earp's good friends in the Welsh family did not appreciate Josephine's gambling habits, and they noted that she received an allowance from her half-sister Rebecca and gambled it away, often leaving her husband hungry.

In the 1920s, Earp gave Josephine signed legal papers and filing fees for a claim for an oil lease in Kern County, California. She gambled away the filing fees and lied to him about what happened to the lease, which later proved valuable. He distrusted her ability to manage her finances and made an arrangement with her sister Henrietta Lenhardt. He put oil leases in Henrietta's name with the agreement that the proceeds would benefit Josephine after his death. In February 1926, the oil well was completed and was producing 150 barrels a day, but Henrietta's three children refused to keep the agreement after their mother's death and kept the royalties to themselves. Josephine sued her sister's estate in an attempt to collect the royalties.

Josephine later developed a reputation as a shrew who made life difficult for Earp. She frequently griped about his lack of work and financial success and even his character and personality, and he often went on long walks to get away from her. He was furious about her gambling habit, during which she lost considerable sums of money; each may have engaged in extramarital affairs. Josephine could also be controlling, and a relative of Wyatt joked that nobody could convict him of cold-blooded murder because he had lived with her for almost 50 years.

=== Fitzsimmons-Sharkey fight ===
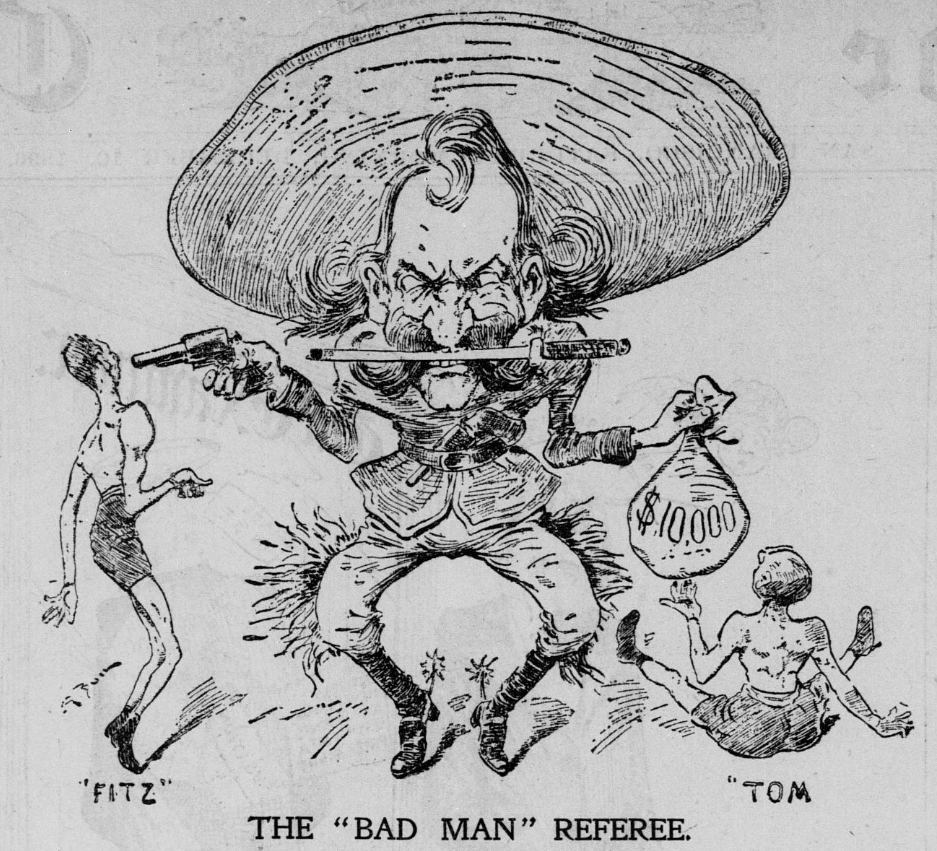
A caricature of Wyatt Earp after the Sharkey-Fitzsimmons fight: The public was outraged by his decision as referee and newspapers pilloried him for many weeks afterward

Earp was a last-minute choice as referee for a boxing match on December 2, 1896, which the promoters billed as the heavyweight championship of the world, when Bob Fitzsimmons was set to fight Tom Sharkey at the Mechanics' Pavilion in San Francisco. Earp had refereed 30 or so matches in earlier days, though not under the Marquess of Queensberry Rules but under the older and more liberal London Prize Ring Rules. The fight may have been the most anticipated fight on American soil that year. Fitzsimmons was favored to win, and the public, including civic officials, placed bets on the outcome.

Fitzsimmons dominated Sharkey throughout the fight, and he hit Sharkey with his famed "solar plexus punch" in the eighth round, an uppercut under the heart that could render a man temporarily helpless. Then, at Fitzsimmons' next punch, Sharkey dropped, clutched his groin, and rolled on the canvas screaming foul. Earp stopped the bout, ruling that Fitzsimmons had hit Sharkey below the belt, but no one seemed to have witnessed the punch. Earp awarded the fight to Sharkey, whom attendants carried out "limp as a rag". The 15,000 fans in attendance greeted his decision with loud boos and catcalls. It was widely believed that no foul had occurred and that Earp had bet on Sharkey. Several doctors verified afterward that Sharkey had been hit hard below the belt, but the public had bet heavily on Fitzsimmons and was livid at the outcome.

Fitzsimmons went to court to overturn Earp's decision, and over the next two weeks, newspaper accounts and testimony revealed a conspiracy among the boxing promoters to fix the fight's outcome. Newspapers across the United States republished the stories from the San Francisco papers and looked for local angles. On December 14, 1896, the San Francisco Call quoted a story from the New York Journal by Alfred H. Lewis, who accused the Earp brothers of being "stage robbers", and Earp was parodied in editorial caricatures by newspapers across the country. Stories about the fight and Earp's contested decision were distributed nationwide to a public that knew little of Wyatt Earp prior to that time.

On December 17, Judge Sanderson finally ruled that prizefighting was illegal in San Francisco and that the courts would not determine the winner. Sharkey retained the purse, but the decision provided no vindication for Earp. Until the fight, Earp had been a minor figure known regionally in California and Arizona; afterward, his name was known from coast to coast. The boxing match left a smear on his public character that followed him until after he died. Eight years later, Dr. B. Brookes Lee was accused of treating Sharkey to make it appear that he had been fouled by Fitzsimmons, and Lee admitted that it was true. "I fixed Sharkey up to look as if he had been fouled," he confessed. "I got $1,000 for my part in the affair."

=== Klondike Gold Rush ===
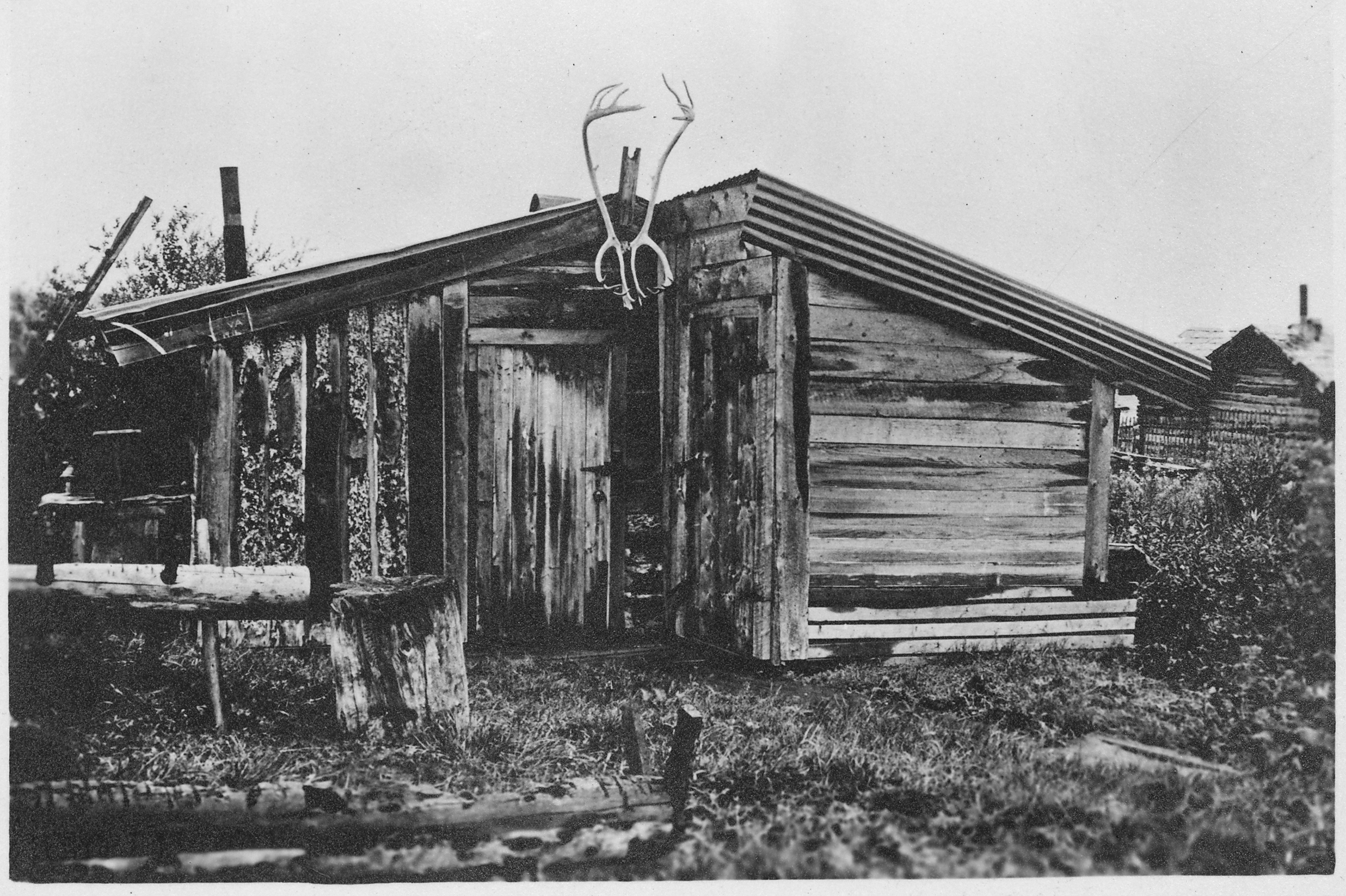
The Earps rented this cabin in Rampart, Alaska, from Rex Beach and spent the winter of 1898–1899 there

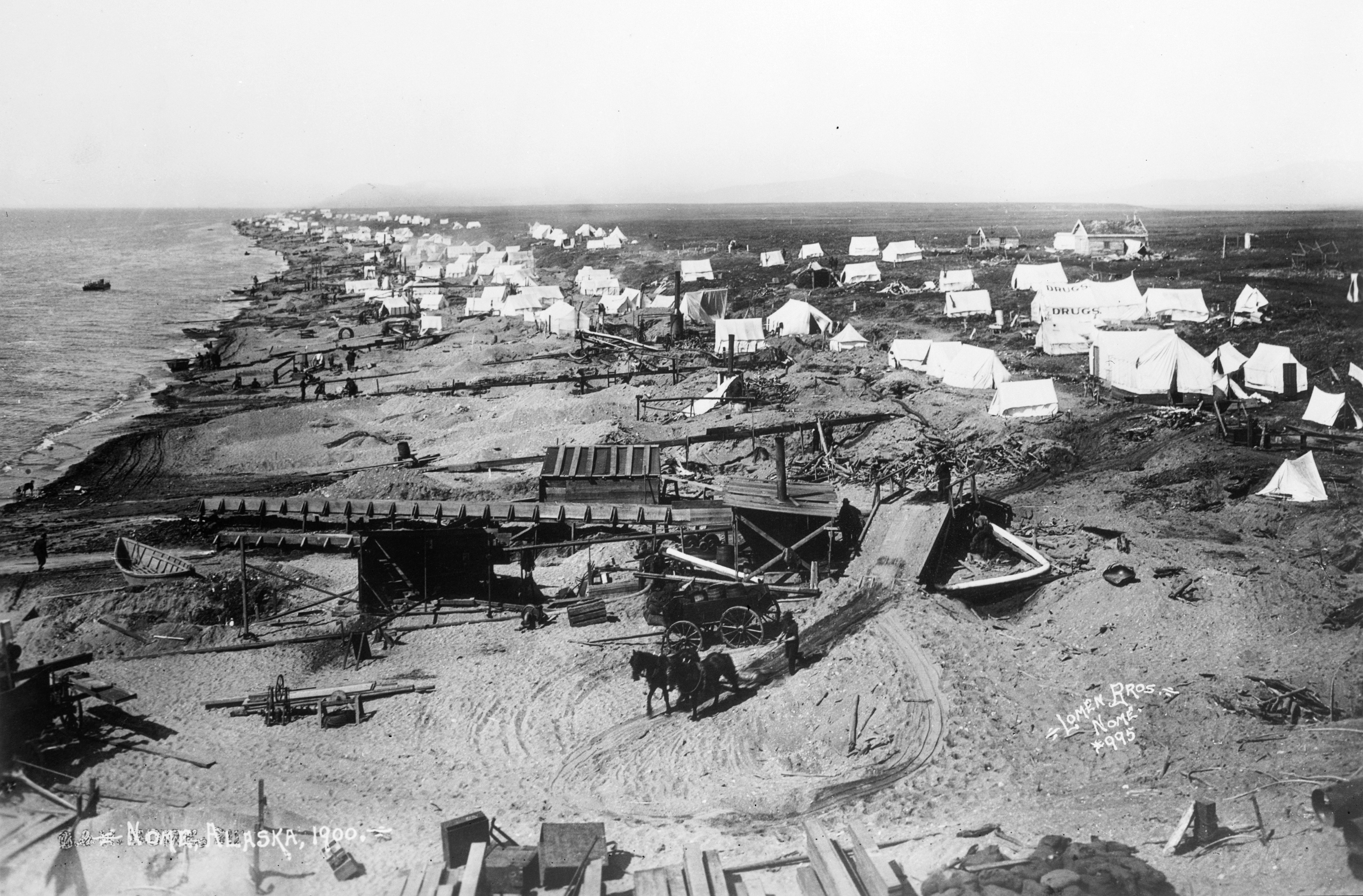
Nome, Alaska in 1900 was about two blocks wide and five miles long

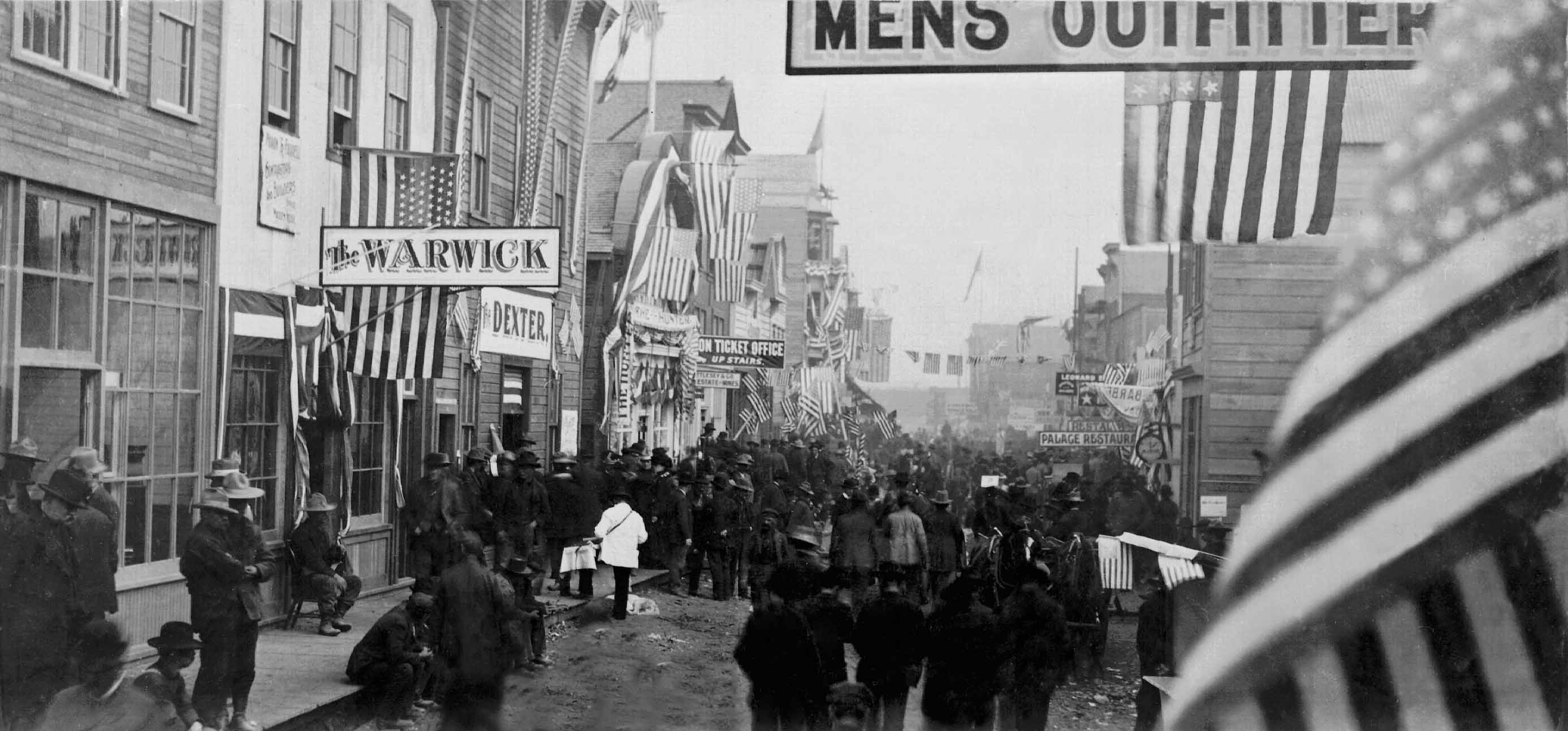
Nome, Alaska, in 1900: The Dexter Saloon at left was owned by Wyatt Earp and his partner Charles E. Hoxie. It was the city's first two-story wooden building and its largest and most luxurious saloon

While in Yuma, Wyatt heard of the gold rush in the Alaska Yukon. On August 5, 1897, Wyatt and Sadie left for San Francisco. Earp was reported to have secured the backing of a syndicate of sporting men to open a gambling house there. They intended to catch a ship to Alaska, but their departure was delayed for seven weeks when Wyatt fell while getting off the Market Street streetcar and bruised or broke his hip. Sadie got pregnant, too, and she thought she could persuade Earp from heading to Alaska. He was in agreement, but Sadie, who was 37, miscarried soon after. They finally boarded the steamship Rosalie on September 21, 1897. They arrived in Dawson in the Yukon on late September, where Wyatt planned to open a faro game. Wyatt and Josephine spent only a month in Dawson.

When they returned north, Wyatt was offered a job as the marshal in Wrangell, Alaska, but he served for only ten days. Sadie learned she was pregnant again, and they returned to San Francisco on October 11 aboard the steamship City of Seattle. But Sadie miscarried again.

The Earps spent the winter in Wrangell before setting out in the spring for Dawson on board the Governor Pingree via the Yukon River. By the time they reached Rampart on the Yukon River, freeze-up had set in. The Earps rented a cabin from Rex Beach for $100 a month and spent the winter of 1898–1899 there.

In 1898, they reached Rampart before the Yukon River froze over for the winter. Rampart was a friendly place, but far from the real action. They left with the spring thaw and headed for St. Michael, on the Norton Sound, a major gateway to the Alaskan interior via the Yukon River. Wyatt managed a small store during the spring of 1899, selling beer and cigars for the Alaska Commercial Company. But Wyatt's friend Tex Rickard sent him a number of letters belittling Wyatt's steady but small income in St. Michael as "chickenfeed" and persuaded him to relocate to Nome.

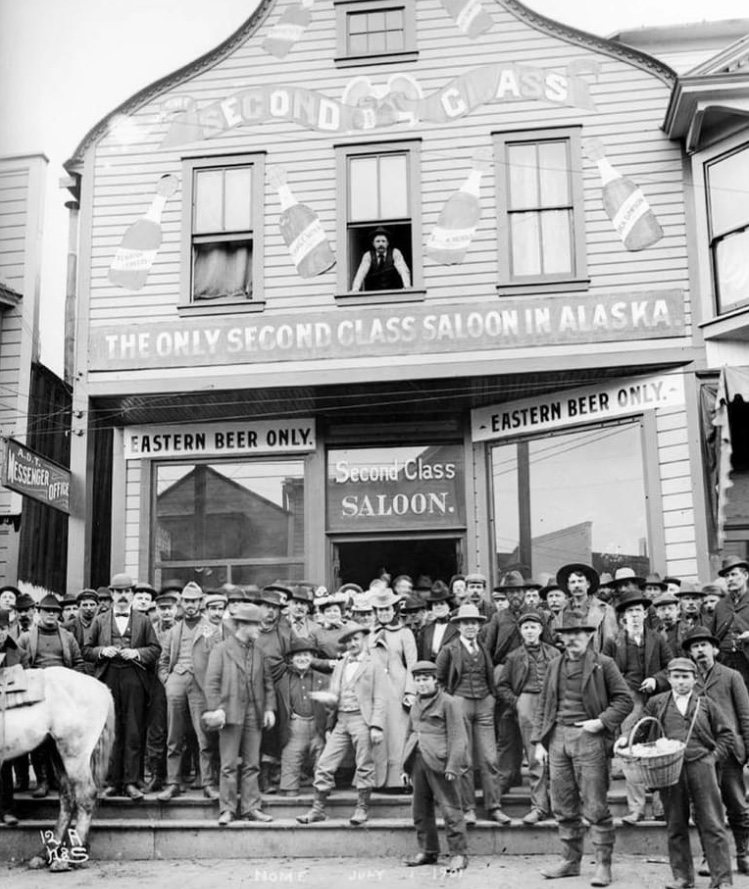
Photographed in 1901, Wyatt Earp billed his Dexter Saloon in Nome as "the only second class saloon in Alaska".

At the time of the Earps' arrival, Nome was two blocks wide and five miles long. The best accommodation Wyatt and Sadie could find was a wooden shack a few minutes from the main street, only slightly better than a tent. The river was an open sewer. Typhoid, dysentery and pneumonia were common. In September, Earp and partner Charles E. Hoxie built the Dexter Saloon in Nome, the city's first two-story wooden building and its largest and most luxurious saloon. The second floor had 12 "clubrooms" decorated with fine mirrors, thick carpets, draperies, and sideboards. Trading on Earp's name, the Dexter was a success. It was used for a variety of purposes because it was so large: 70 by 30 feet (21.3 m × 9.1 m) with 12 feet (3.7 m) ceilings. Earp used the club rooms upstairs as a brothel, another fact that Sadie worked hard to see omitted from stories about him. Sadie justified the services upstairs because the Dexter was a "better class" saloon and served an "important civic purpose".

The Dexter drew anyone famous who visited Nome. Wyatt rubbed elbows with future novelist Rex Beach, writer Jack London, playwright Wilson Mizner, and boxing promoter Tex Rickard, with whom Earp developed a long-lasting relationship. Rickard was a partner in the Northern Saloon and gambling house in Nome. Both the Dexter and the Northern Saloon competed for business with more than sixty other saloons in town serving an estimated 20,000 residents. Wyatt told others he made his money by "mining the miners".

He was arrested twice in Nome for minor offenses, including being drunk and disorderly, although he was not tried. Most members of law enforcement were corrupt or paid no-shows.

Wyatt Earp in Nome, Alaska, with long-time friend and former Tombstone mayor and newspaper editor John Clum, 1900

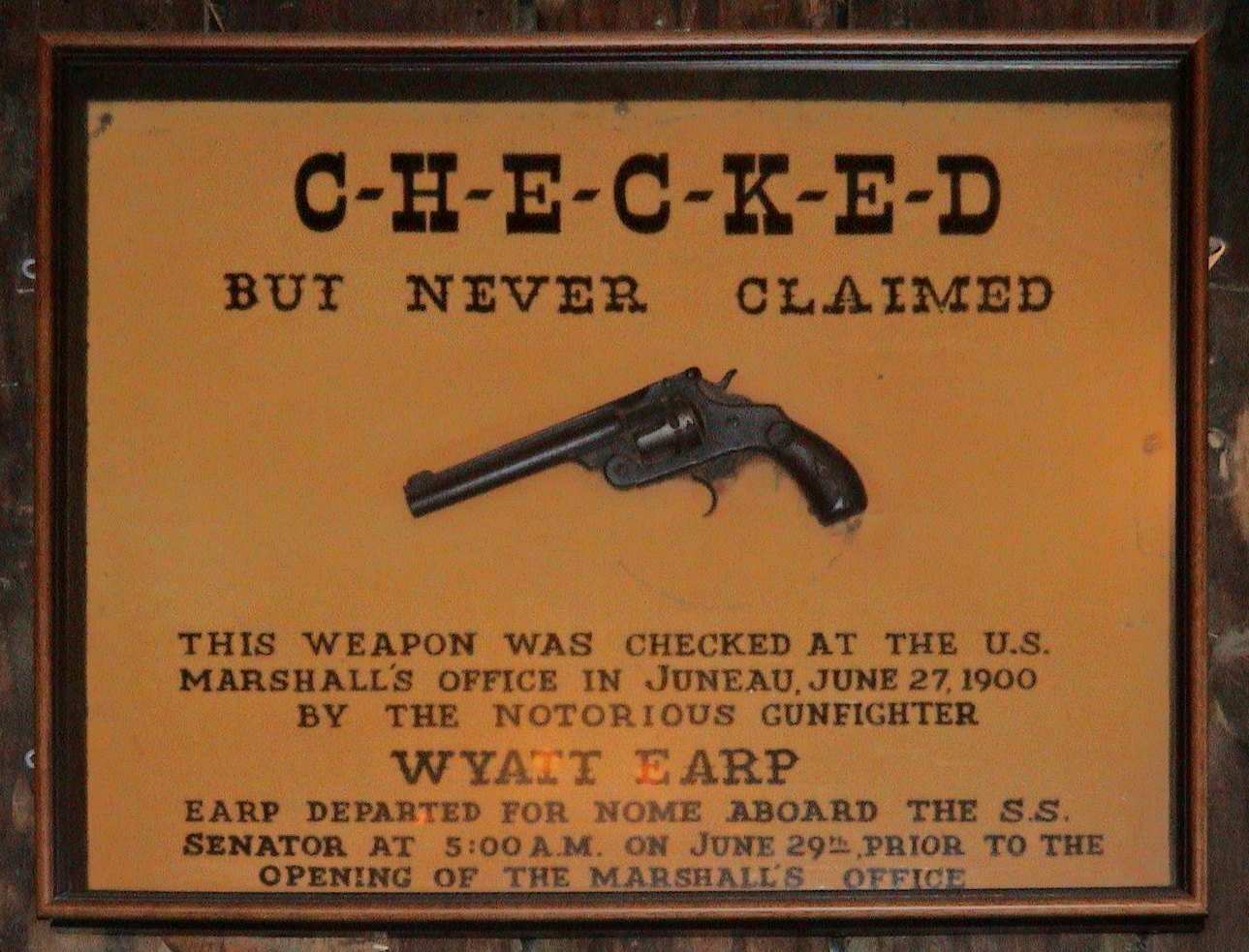
The pistol was said to be Wyatt Earp's, left behind in Juneau, Alaska, but he was arrested in Nome three days before the date on the sign

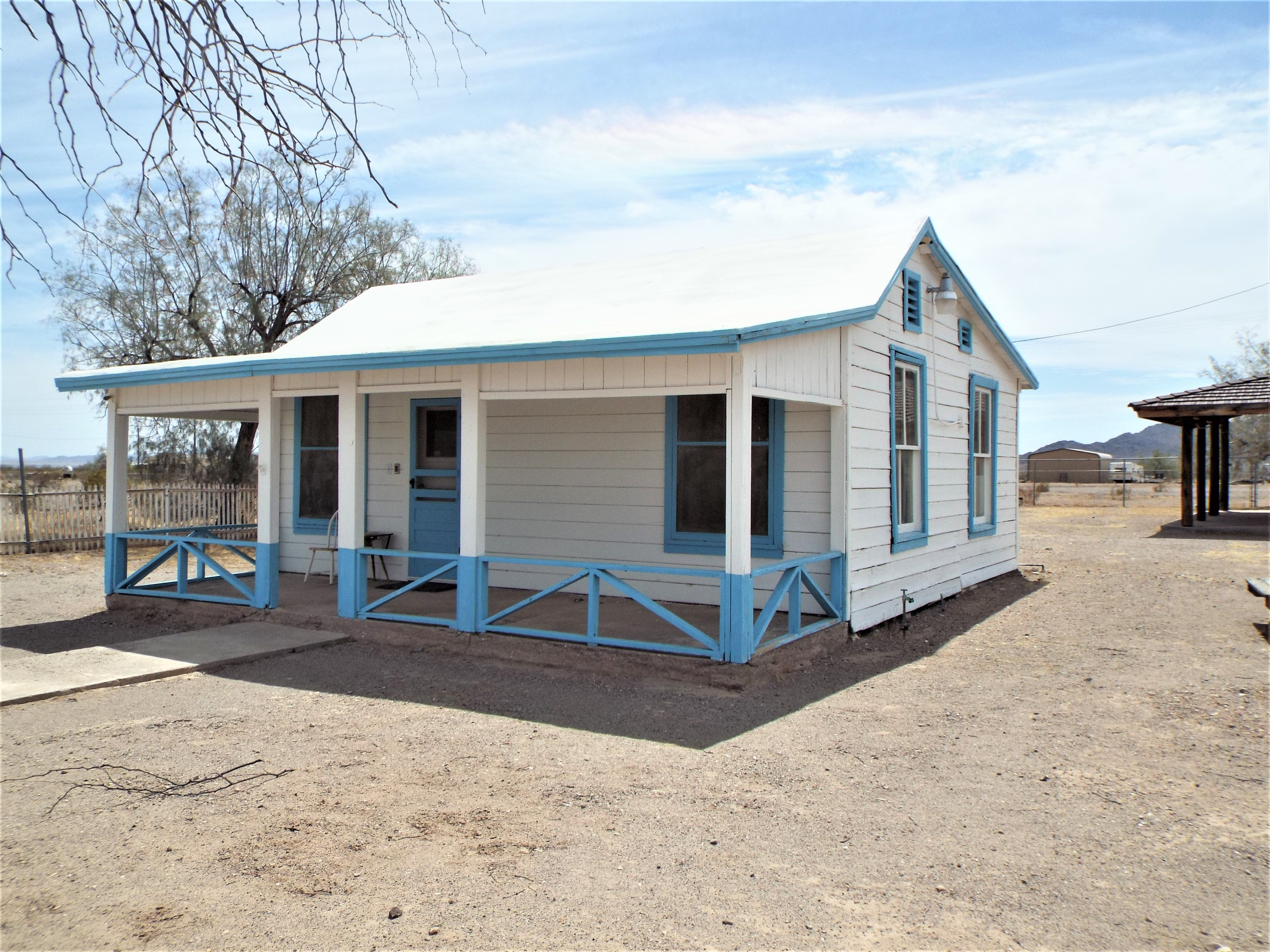
The Wyatt Earp and Josephine Sarah Marcus Cottage in Vidal, California

In November 1899, Earp left Alaska on the 258 ft (79 m) iron steamer Cleveland. The ship was infested with lice and was struck by a storm on the Bering Sea, making for a difficult trip. It took nine days to reach Seattle, Washington.

On July 6, 1900, Wyatt's brother Warren was shot and killed in a saloon in Willcox, Arizona. Wyatt learned about his death soon after, and although some modern researchers believe he went to Arizona to avenge his brother's death, the distance and time required to make the trip made it unlikely, and no contemporary evidence has been found to support that theory.

In 2018 archivists at the Alaska State Archives digitized a collection of documents relating to Earp's arrival and stay in Alaska.

=== Saloon ownership and gambling ===
Earp arrived in Seattle with a plan to open a saloon and gambling room. On November 25, 1899, the Seattle Star described him as "a man of great reputation among the toughs and criminals, inasmuch as he formerly walked the streets of a rough frontier mining town with big pistols stuck in his belt, spurs on his boots, and a devil-may-care expression upon his official face". The Seattle Daily Times was less full of praise, announcing in a very small article that he had a reputation in Arizona as a "bad man", which in that era was synonymous with "villain" and "desperado".

He faced considerable opposition to his plan from John Considine, who controlled all three gaming operations in town. Although gambling was illegal, Considine had worked out an agreement with Police Chief C. S. Reed. Earp partnered with an established local gambler named Thomas Urguhart, and they opened the Union Club saloon and gambling operation in Seattle's Pioneer Square. The Seattle Star noted two weeks later that Earp's saloon was developing a large following. Considine unsuccessfully tried to intimidate Earp, but his saloon continued to prosper. After the city failed to act, on March 23, 1900, the Washington state attorney general filed charges against several gamblers, including Earp and his partner. The club's furnishings were confiscated and burned.

Newspapers in Seattle and San Francisco falsely reported on Wyatt's wealth, which prompted a stampede to Nome to seek similar riches.

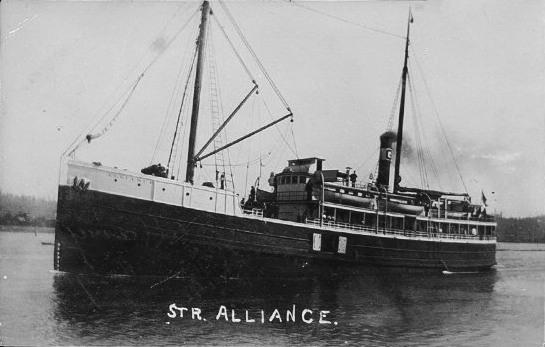
Passenger steamship Alliance approaching the dock in Marshfield, Oregon. She carried passengers and freight along the west coast of North America to Alaska and back until about 1910.

On June 14, 1900, Wyatt and Sadie boarded the steamer SS Alliance in Seattle, bound for Nome. They brought many luxurious accessories with them to decorate The Dexter. Within weeks, Nome had grown to a city of over 20,000. In 1900 the major business there "was not mining, but gambling and saloon trade. There were 100 saloons and gambling houses, with an occasional restaurant." Losses of $10,000 per hand in poker were not extraordinary. Prize fighting became the sport of choice, and Wyatt's income soared with side bets. He often refereed bouts himself at The Dexter.

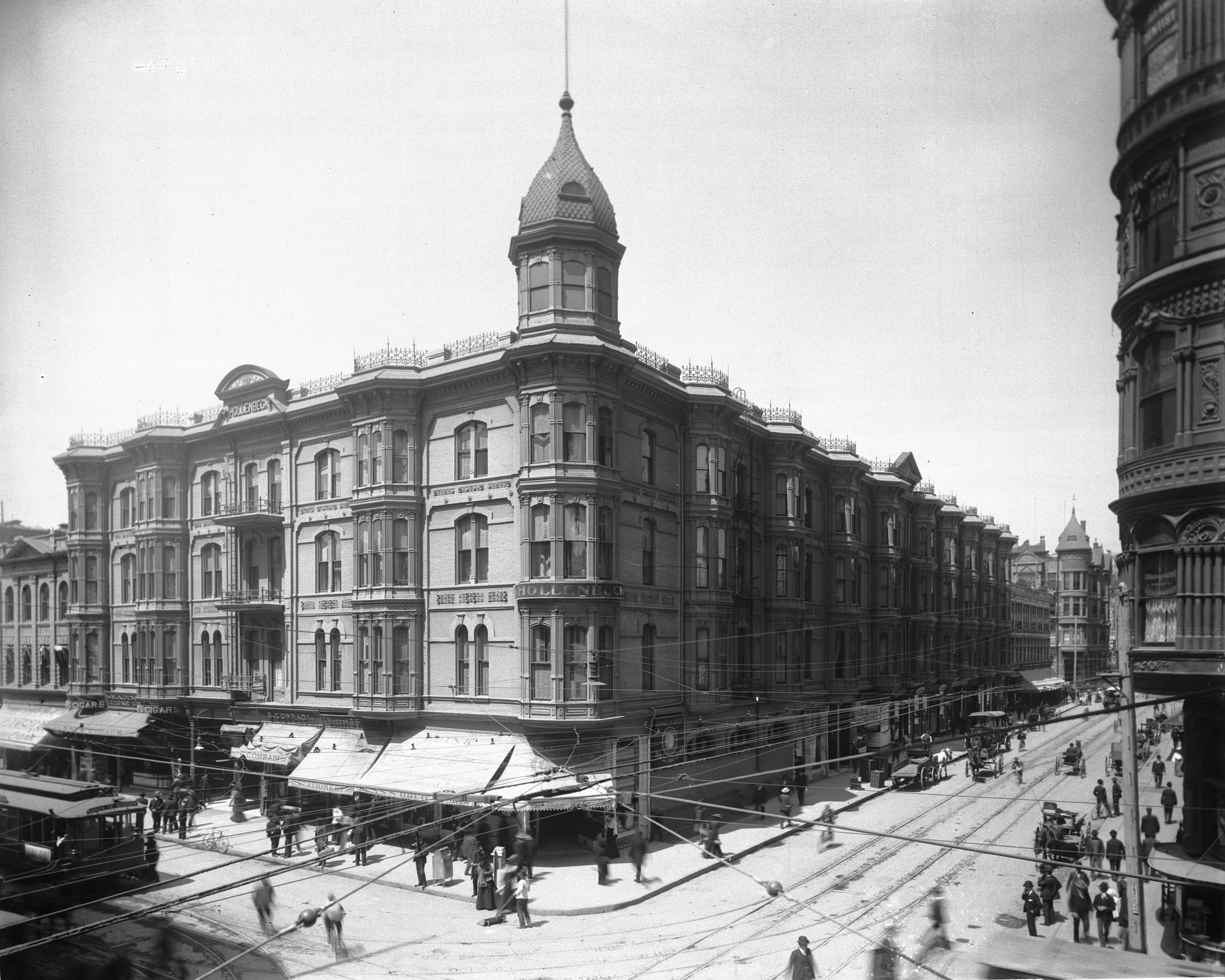
The Earps stayed at the Hollenback Hotel in Los Angeles in December 1901 after returning from Alaska

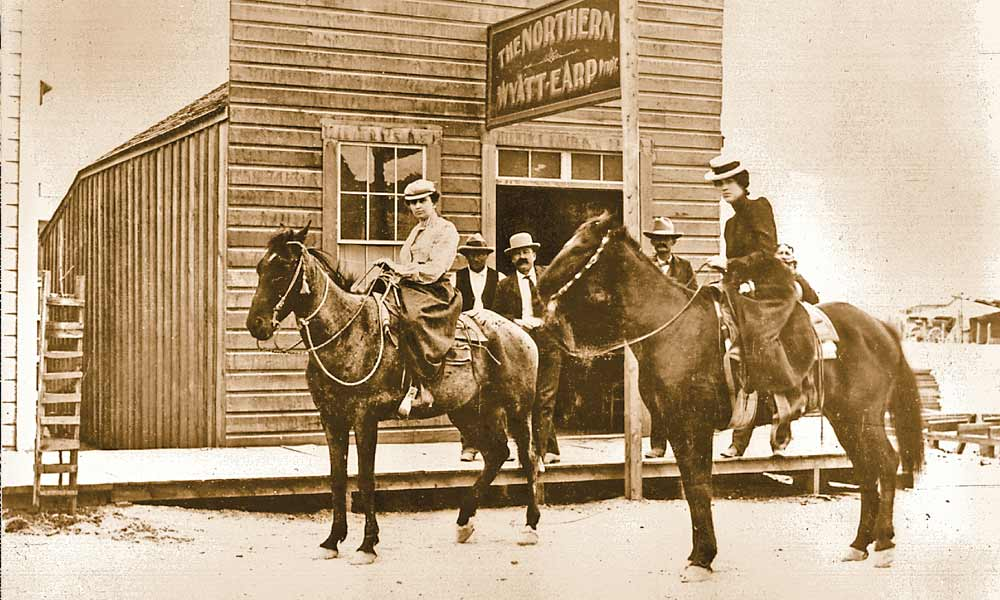
Wyatt Earp's Northern Saloon, Tonopah, Nevada, c. 1902. The man in the center is believed to be Wyatt Earp, and the woman on the left is often identified as Josephine Earp

In November 1901, at age 40, Sadie got pregnant again, and she and Wyatt decided to leave Alaska. They sold their interest in the Dexter to their partner, Charlie Hoxie.

Wyatt and Sadie left Alaska on board the SS Roanoke and arrived in Los Angeles at the Hollenbeck Hotel on December 13, 1901. They had an estimated US$80,000 (equivalent to $3,096,000 in 2025), a relative fortune.

Three months later, in February 1902, they arrived in Tonopah, Nevada, known as the "Queen of the Silver Camps", where silver and gold had been discovered in 1900. When they arrived, they had to endure a two-week blizzard. They soon learned unemployment was high, and many residents had already moved on.

Wyatt and Josie persevered, and within a few months, he and Al Martin opened the Northern Saloon. Earp hauled ore and supplies for the Tonopah Mining Company to the Carson and Colorado Railroad depots at Sodaville and Candelaria. He was briefly appointed Deputy U.S. Marshal in Tonopah under Marshal J.F. Emmitt, but his duties were limited to serving papers to defendants in federal court cases.

Disappointed with future prospects in Tonopah, they sold their interests in the summer of 1903. They prospected in the desert around Silver Peak, Esmeralda County, and wintered in Los Angeles. They staked three claims in the Palmetto Mountains but never found anything of value. They visited his brother Virgil and his wife in 1905 in Goldfield, Nevada, where Virgil had become an Esmeralda County deputy sheriff. Tex Rickard was also already there and had opened a second Northern Saloon. He briefly hired Wyatt as a pit boss.

Wyatt also staked mining claims just outside Death Valley and elsewhere in the Mojave Desert. In 1906 he discovered several deposits of gold and copper in the Whipple Mountains near the Sonoran Desert town of Vidal, California, on the Colorado River and filed more than 100 mining claims His saloon, oil, and copper mining interests produced some income for a period. While in Los Angeles, they lived in at least nine small Los Angeles rentals as early as 1885 and as late as 1929, mainly during the summer.

=== Life in Los Angeles ===
In 1910, when he was 62, the Los Angeles Police Department hired Wyatt and former Los Angeles detective Arthur Moore King at $10.00 per day to carry out various tasks "outside the law" such as retrieving criminals from Mexico, which he did very capably. This led to Wyatt's final armed confrontation. In October 1910, he was asked by former Los Angeles Police Commissioner H. L. Lewis to head up a posse to protect surveyors of the American Trona Company. They were attempting to wrest control of mining claims for vast deposits of potash on the edge of Searles Lake that were held in receivership by the foreclosed California Trona Company.

Wyatt and the group he guarded were considered claim jumpers and were confronted by armed representatives of the other company. King wrote, "It was the nerviest thing he had ever seen." With guns pulled, Wyatt came out of his tent with a Winchester rifle, firing a round at the feet of Federal Receiver Stafford W. Austin. "Back off or I'll blow you apart, or my name is not Wyatt Earp." The owners summoned the U.S. marshal, who arrested Earp and 27 others, serving them with a summons for contempt of court, sending them home. Earp's actions did not resolve the dispute, which eventually escalated into the "Potash Wars" of the Mojave Desert.

On July 23, 1911, Earp was arrested in Los Angeles and charged with attempting to fleece J. Y. Peterson, a realty broker, in a fake faro game. Since money had not changed hands, the charge against Earp was reduced to vagrancy, and he was released on $500 bail.

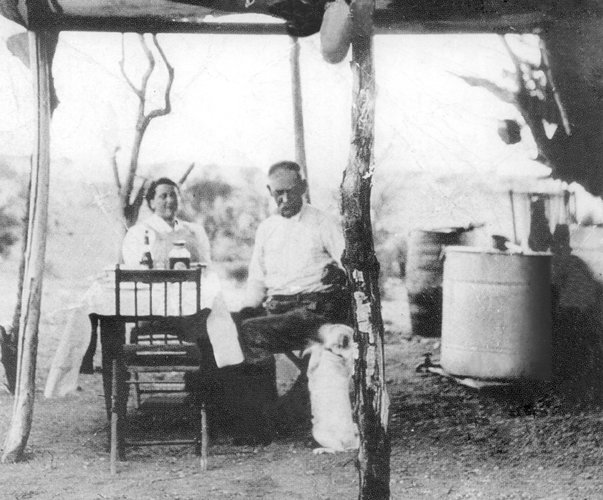
Wyatt and Josephine Earp in their mining camp near Vidal, California: This is the only confirmed picture of the two of them together

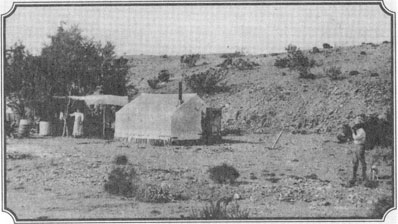
Wyatt Earp's camp, tent and ramada near Vidal, California and Wyatt's mining operations. Sadie is at left, Wyatt is on the right with his dog

The Earps bought a small cottage in Vidal, the only home they ever owned. Beginning in 1911 and until Wyatt's health began to fail in 1928, Wyatt and Sadie Earp summered in Los Angeles and spent the rest of the year in the desert working their claims. The "Happy Days" mine was located in the Whipple Mountains, a few miles north of Vidal. Wyatt had some modest success with the Happy Days gold mine, and they lived on the slim proceeds of income from that and oil wells in Oakland and Kern County.

Around 1923, Charles Welsh, a retired railroad engineer and friend that Earp had known since Dodge City, frequently invited the Earps to visit his family in San Bernardino.

When the Welsh family moved to Los Angeles, the Earps accepted an invitation to stay with them in their top-floor apartment for a while until they found a place to rent. After Earp and Sadie moved into a bungalow nearby, Charlie Welsh's daughter, Grace Spolidora, recalled that Sadie, who had never had many domestic skills, did very little housekeeping or cooking for Wyatt. She and her sister Alma were concerned about the care Sadie gave Wyatt. Though he was at times very ill, Sadie still did not cook for him. Spolidora, her sisters, and her mother brought in meals.

=== Movie connections ===
While living in Los Angeles, Earp served as an unpaid film consultant on several silent cowboy movies. In 1915, Earp visited the set of director Allan Dwan's movie, The Half-Breed, starring Douglas Fairbanks. In his autobiography, Dwan recalled, "As was the custom in those days, he [Earp] was invited to join the party and mingle with our background action."

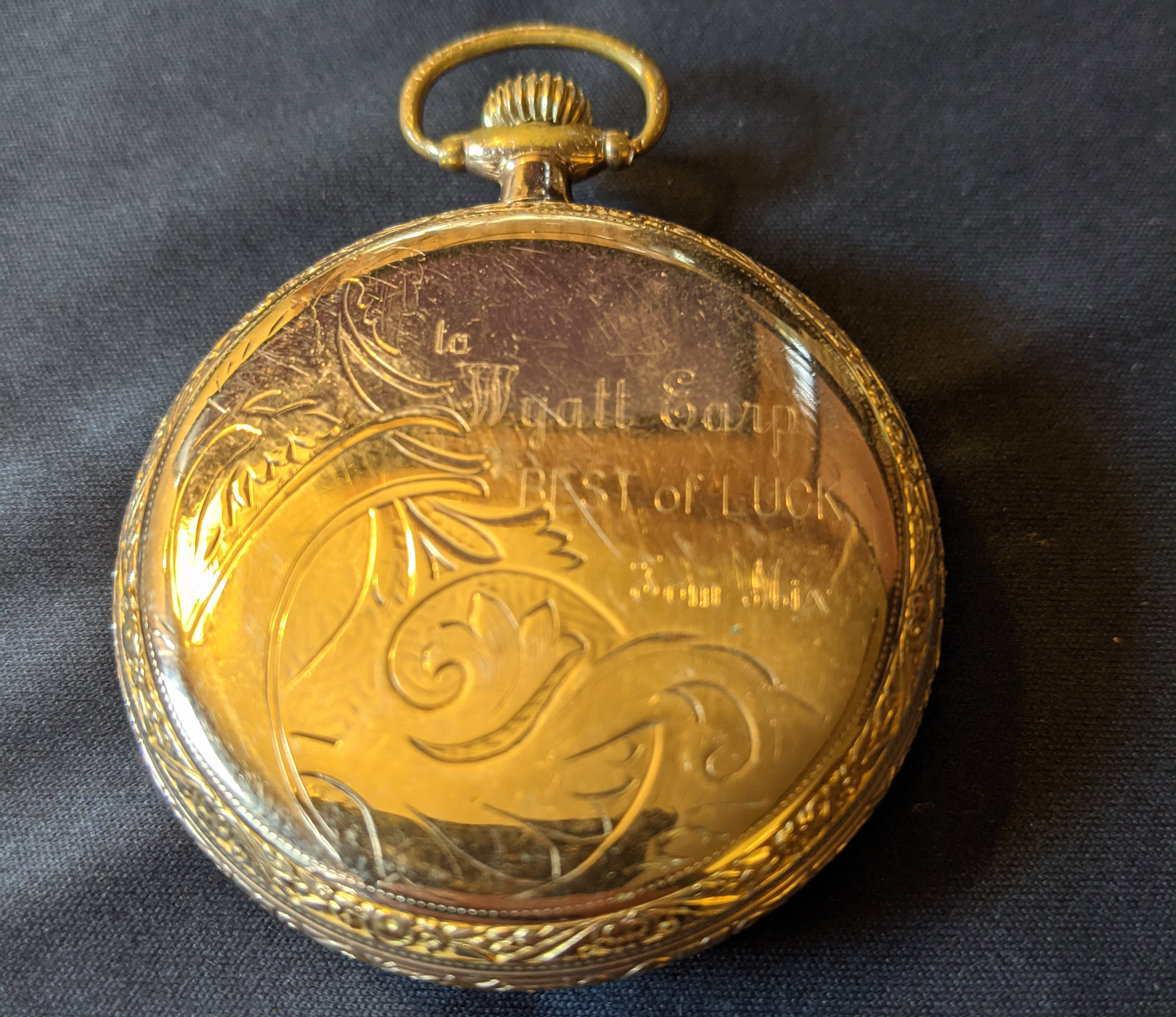
Obverse of pocket watch given to Wyatt Earp by Tom Mix

Earp became friends with William S. Hart and later Tom Mix, the two most famous movie cowboys of their era. Hart was a stickler for realism in his depictions of Western life, and may have relied on Earp for advice. Earp later frequently visited the sets of movie director John Ford, whose movies starred Harry Carey. Ford's son Patrick later wrote, "My dad was real friendly with Wyatt Earp, and as a little boy I remember him."

In 1916, Earp went with his friend Jack London, whom he knew from Nome, to visit the set of former cowboy, sailor, and movie actor-turned-film director Raoul Walsh, who was shooting at the studio of Mutual Film conglomerate in Edendale, California. Walsh took the two men to dinner at Al Levy's Cafe on Main and Third Street. During the meal, the highest paid entertainer in the world, Charlie Chaplin, dropped by to greet Wyatt Earp. Chaplin was impressed by both men, but particularly the former Tombstone marshal.

In the early 1920s, Earp was given the honorary title of deputy sheriff in San Bernardino County, California. On January 25, 1926, Wyatt's brother James died of cerebral apoplexy in San Bernardino, California.

Earp tried to persuade his good friend, well-known cowboy movie star William S. Hart, to help set the record straight about his life and get a movie made. "If the story were exploited on the screen by you," he wrote Hart, "It would do much toward setting me right before a public which has always been fed lies about me." Hart encouraged Earp to first find an author to pen his story.

In 1925 Earp began to collaborate on a biography with his friend and former mining engineer John Flood to get his story told in a way that he approved. Flood volunteered his time and attempted to write an authorized biography of Earp's life, based on Earp's recollections. The two men sat together every Sunday in the kitchen of Earp's modest, rented bungalow. While Wyatt sipped a drink and smoked a cigar, they tried to tell Earp's story, but Josephine was always present. She often interrupted and insisted, "You can't write that! It needs to be clean." She also demanded that they add more "pep" to the manuscript, which in her mind meant including the word "CRACK!" in all capitals. In the chapter about the shootout, the manuscript includes 109 uses of "CRACK". She thought Earp needed to be shown as a hero, and the manuscript includes a chapter titled "Conflagration" in which Earp saves two women, one a cripple, from a Tombstone fire.

Spolidora, as a teenager, had visited the Earps many times near her family home in Needles, California, and she sometimes went to San Diego with them. In an interview with the San Bernardino historical society in 1990, she attributed the highly exaggerated stories about Wyatt Earp to Josephine. Josephine "would always interfere whenever Wyatt would talk with Stuart Lake. She always interfered! She wanted him to look like a church-going saint and blow things up. Wyatt didn't want that at all!"

Flood's writing was "stilted, corny, and one-dimensional", and the manuscript, completed sometime in early 1926, never found a publisher. In February 1927, editor Anne Johnston of Bobbs Merrill wrote back and was highly critical of the "stilted, florid, and diffuse" writing. She wrote, "Now one forgets what it's all about in the clutter of unimportant details that impedes its pace, and the pompous manner of its telling."

Hart tried to help. In February 1926, he wrote The Saturday Evening Post and encouraged them to publish Flood's biography so "that ... the rising generation may know the real from the unreal", but Flood was a horrendous writer, and publisher after publisher rejected the manuscript. Several copies were made and sold in 1981, and the original carbon copy of the typed manuscript, found among Josephine Earp's papers, was given by Glenn Boyer to the Ford County Historical Society.

== Death ==
Wyatt Earp was the last surviving Earp brother and the last surviving participant of the gunfight at the O.K. Corral when he died at home in the Earps' small rented bungalow at 4004 W 17th Street, in Los Angeles, of chronic cystitis on January 13, 1929, at the age of 80. The Los Angeles Times reported that he had been ill with liver disease for three years. His brother Newton had died almost a month prior on December 18, 1928. Wyatt was survived by Josephine and his sister, Adelia Earp Edwards. He had no children. Charlie Welsh's daughter Grace Spolidora and his daughter-in-law Alma were the only witnesses to Wyatt's cremation. Josephine was apparently too grief-stricken to assist.

=== Hollywood pallbearers ===
The funeral was held at the Congregational Church on Wilshire Boulevard. Earp's pallbearers were William J. Hunsaker (Earp's attorney in Tombstone and noted Los Angeles attorney), Jim Mitchell (Los Angeles Examiner reporter and Hollywood screenwriter), George W. Parsons (founding member of Tombstone's "Committee of Vigilance"), Wilson Mizner (a friend of Wyatt's during the Klondike Gold Rush), John Clum (a good friend from his days in Tombstone, former Tombstone mayor, and editor of The Tombstone Epitaph), William S. Hart (good friend and Western actor and silent film star), and Tom Mix (friend and Western film star). Mitchell wrote Wyatt's local obituary. The newspapers reported that Tom Mix cried during his friend's service. When Josephine did not attend Wyatt's funeral, Grace Spolidora was furious. "She didn't go to his funeral, even. She wasn't that upset. She was peculiar. I don't think she was that devastated when he died."

=== Private burial and theft of gravestones ===
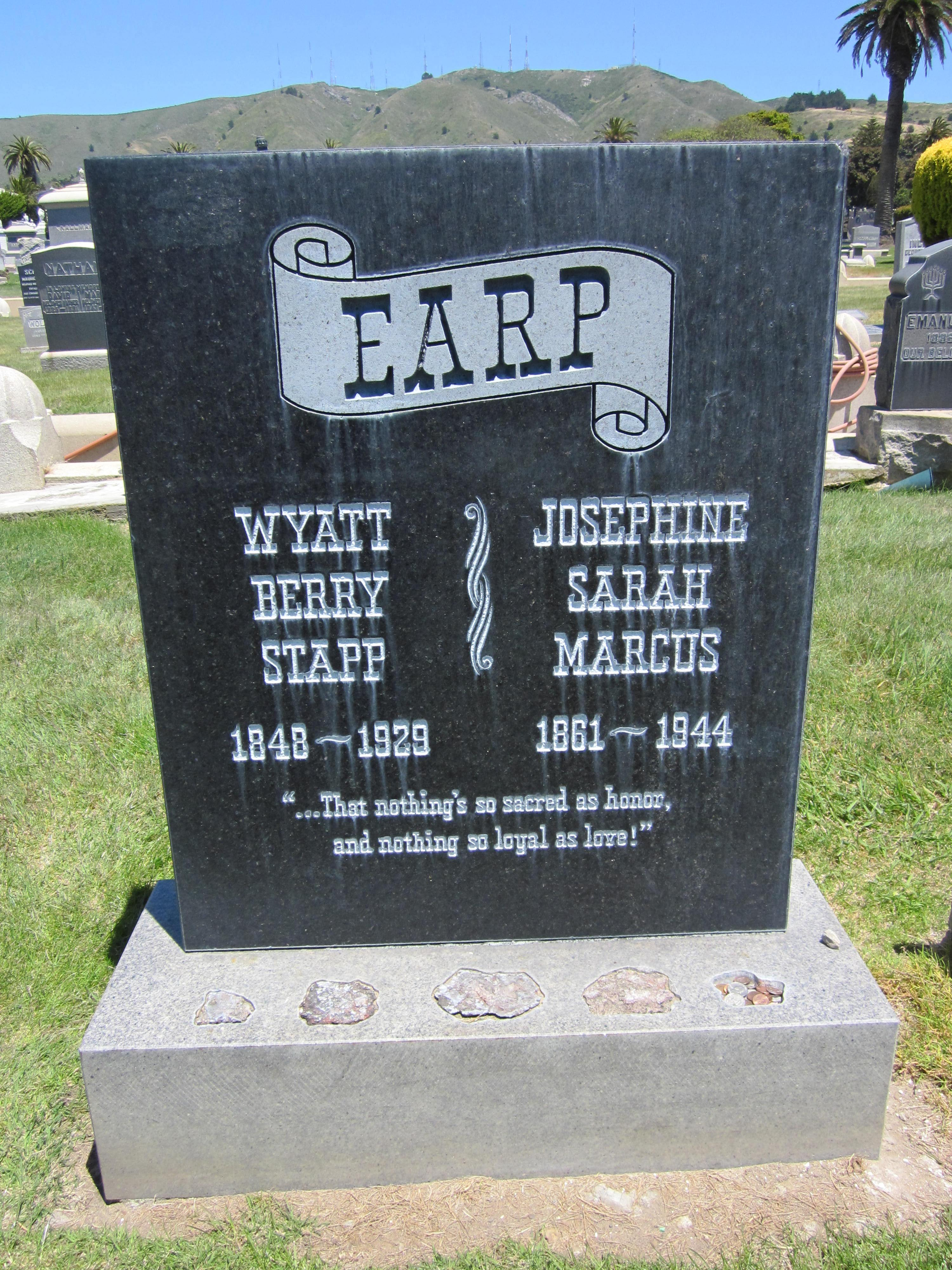
The Earps' replacement headstone at the Jewish Hills of Eternity Cemetery in Colma, California

Josephine, who was Jewish, had Earp's body cremated and secretly buried his remains in the Marcus family plot at the Hills of Eternity Memorial Park, a Jewish cemetery in Colma, California. When she died in 1944, her body was buried alongside his ashes. She had purchased a small white marble headstone, which was stolen shortly after her death in 1944. It was discovered in a backyard in Fresno, California. A second flat granite headstone was also stolen.

In 1957, the Tombstone Restoration Commission sought Wyatt's ashes with the intention of relocating them to Tombstone. They contacted family members seeking permission and the location of his ashes, but no one could or would tell them where they were buried, not even his closest living relative, George Earp. Arthur King, a deputy to Earp from 1910 to 1912, finally revealed that Josephine had buried Wyatt's ashes in Colma, California. The Marcus family kept the location secret to avoid hordes of visitors from trampling the site. The Tombstone Commission decided not to seek to relocate Earp's remains. His and Josie's gravesite is the most-visited resting place in the Jewish cemetery.

On July 7, 1957, grave robbers dug 5 feet (1.5 m) into the Earps' grave in an apparent attempt to steal the urn containing his ashes. Unable to find his cremains, they stole the 500-pound (230 kg) grave stone. Actor Hugh O'Brian, who was playing Earp in the 1955–1961 television series, The Life and Legend of Wyatt Earp, offered a reward for the stone's return. It was located for sale at a flea market.

Cemetery officials reset the stone flush in concrete, but it was stolen again. Actor Kevin Costner, who played Earp in the 1994 movie Wyatt Earp, offered to buy a new, larger stone, but the Marcus family thought his offer was self-serving and declined. Descendants of Josie's half-sister Rebecca allowed a Southern California group in 1998-99 to erect the stone currently in place. The earlier stone is on display in the Colma Historical museum.

== Wyatt Earp's reputation ==
Wyatt Earp's fame and reputation have varied throughout the years. Among his peers near the time of his death, Earp was respected. Earp was often the target of negative newspaper stories that disparaged his and his brothers' reputations. As media accounts of his life have changed over the years, public perception of his life has also varied.

== See also ==
- Wyatt Earp in popular culture
