= Newman Haynes Clanton =

American outlaw (c. 1816–1881)

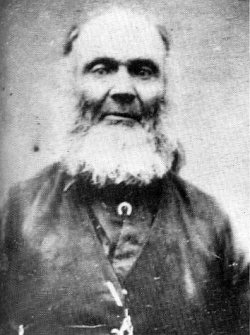
- Newman Haynes Clanton c. 1880
- Born: c. 1816; Davidson County, Tennessee
- Died: August 13, 1881 (aged 64–65); Guadalupe Canyon, Arizona Territory
- Cause of death: Killed in an ambush
- Other name: Old Man Clanton
- Occupations: Rancher and outlaw
- Known for: Cattle rustling
- Spouse: Mariah Sexton Kelso (m. 1840)
- Children: 7: John Wesley; Phineas Fay; Joseph Isaac; William Harrison; Mary Elsie; Ester Ann; Alonzo Peter
- Allegiance: The Cowboys

Newman Haynes Clanton (c. 1816 – August 13, 1881), also known as "Old Man" Clanton, was a cattle rancher and father of four sons, one of whom was killed during the Gunfight at the O.K. Corral. Two of his sons were involved in multiple conflicts in Cochise County, Arizona Territory including stagecoach robbery and cattle rustling. One witness identified his son Ike Clanton as a participant in the murder of Morgan Earp. Billy Clanton and Ike were at the O.K. Corral. "Old Man" Clanton was reportedly involved with stealing cattle from Mexican ranchers and re-selling them in the United States. Records indicate he participated in the Skeleton Canyon Massacre of Mexican smugglers. In retaliation, Mexican Rurales are reported to have ambushed and killed him and a crew of Cowboys in the Guadalupe Canyon Massacre.

== Early life ==
Newman Clanton was born around 1816 in Davidson County, Tennessee, and married Mariah Sexton Kelso in Callaway County, Missouri on January 5, 1840. Newman and Mariah had five sons and two daughters: John Wesley, Phineas Fay, Joseph Isaac, Mary Elsie, Ester Ann, Peter Alonzo, and William "Billy" Harrison. Peter Alonzo died as an infant.

Newman Clanton had been a plantation owner and enslaver in Tennessee before moving the family to Missouri. Over the next 20 years, he moved the family across the west and southwest. He tried gold mining in California before relocating the family to Dallas, Texas around 1853, where they ran a ranch for a time and where their last two children, Ester and Alonzo were born. While in Texas, both Newman and his oldest son John enlisted in the Confederate Home Guard at the outbreak of the American Civil War. Newman was eventually released due to his age.

At the end of the war in 1865, Newman moved the family to Arizona Territory and settled for a time near Fort Bowie near Willcox, Arizona. In 1866, they moved to San Buenaventura, California, and after 26 years of marriage, his wife Mariah died. In 1871, he moved the family to Port Hueneme, California.

== Ranching and smuggling in Cochise County ==
Newman returned to the Arizona Territory in 1873 to the Gila River valley, where he purchased or squatted on a large tract of land outside Camp Thomas. However, his plans for a new town failed to materialize. He resumed cattle ranching, and most of his children followed him to Arizona.

During these many moves, the Clantons had repeated scrapes with the law. Newman and his oldest son, John Wesley, were convicted of desertion during the Civil War. They developed a reputation for theft and thuggery that followed them to Arizona. Newman Clanton sold the ranch near Camp Thomas in 1877, but Billy Clanton often returned to visit the old homestead. Melvin Jones, whose father bought the ranch from Newman, wrote that Billy Clanton first met Frank and Tom McLaury at the ranch in 1878, at the time the McLaury brothers had located land for a cattle ranch in the Sulphur Springs Valley.

After leaving Camp Thomas, Newman Clanton bought land on the San Pedro River, in Lewis Springs, where he built a large adobe house. The home became the headquarters of the Clanton Ranch. Phin obtained work as a freight driver. In the same year prospector Ed Schieffelin discovered silver in the hills east of the San Pedro River on a plateau known as Goose Flats, less than 15 miles (24 km) from the Clanton ranch. The family was very well situated to meet the demands for beef from the booming town of Tombstone. From its founding in March 1879, Tombstone grew from 100 residents to upwards of 15,000 citizens at its peak less than a decade later.

The Tombstone Mill and Mining Company opened a stamping mill about 5 miles (8.0 km) from the Clanton's ranch in 1879 to take advantage of the ready water supply. Another mill soon followed, and both began operations in 1879, The Clanton Ranch grew into a successful enterprise for many reasons. The Clantons also supplied beef to Bisbee and other nearby towns. During his testimony after the shootout at the O.K. Corral, Ike Clanton claimed to have raised and purchased about 700 head of cattle during the past year, and the Clanton ranch was one of the most profitable cattle ranches in that part of the country. However, the Clantons never registered a brand in either Cochise County or Pima County which was required to legally raise cattle.

The Clantons were reputed to be among a group of outlaw Cowboys who crossed the Mexico–United States border, where they stole cattle and re-sold them to the hungry miners in Cochise County. Tom and Frank McLaury worked with the rustlers buying and selling stolen cattle. The Mexican government at the time placed high tariffs on goods transported across the border, making smuggling a profitable enterprise.

The large numbers of men required to work the fast-growing mines led to a rapid increase in the demand for beef cattle. Although some of the cattle ranching was legitimate, the Clantons stole cattle from across the nearby border in Mexico. Clanton and his sons brokered the sale of the stolen animals in the United States. Other ranchers in the area, like that owned by Henry Hooker, raised cattle in the relatively dry area around Tombstone but required a far larger workforce to the same number of animals and protect them from Indian attack in the time it took to raise them.

Brothers John and Phin Clanton worked the family ranch. Phin was arrested several times for cattle rustling and once for robbery but was never convicted. During the early 1880s, several outlaw Cowboys worked on the Clanton Ranch. These included Pony Diehl, "Curly Bill" Brocius, and Frank and Tom McLaury until the McLaurys bought the ranch. Johnny Ringo who had participated in the Mason County War, siding with Texas Ranger and gunman Scott Cooley, became associated with the Clantons.

=== First Skeleton Canyon massacre ===
In July 1879, several rustlers attacked a rancho in northern Sonora, Mexico, killing several of the inhabitants. While hunting the murderers, Mexican Rurales led by Commandant Francisco Neri illegally crossed the border into Arizona and were ambushed. The posse leader was executed. Johnny Ringo later said that he was among the murderers, who also included Old Man Clanton, his sons Ike and Billy, along with "Curly Bill" Brocius, Indian Charlie, brothers Frank and Tom McLaury, Jim Hughes, Rattlesnake Bill, Joe Hill, Charlie Snow, Jake Guage, and Charlie Thomas.

Clanton left his sons to run the San Pedro River ranch and moved to a new ranch in the Animas Valley of New Mexico, only a mile from the Mexico–United States border. This ranch was a staging ground for cross-border cattle raids into Sonora, Mexico.

=== Second Skeleton Canyon massacre ===
Two years later, in July 1881, "Curly Bill" learned that several Mexican smugglers carrying silver were heading to the United States through Skeleton Canyon. He along with Johnny Ringo, Old Man, Ike and Billy Clanton, brothers Frank and Tom McLaury, Billy Grounds, and Zwing Hunt hid in the rocks above the trail. As the smugglers rode through the canyon, the outlaw Cowboys opened fire and killed six of the nineteen men. They killed the rest when they tried to escape.

=== Death at Guadalupe Canyon ===
On August 12, 1881, Clanton and six other men began a journey herding stolen cattle sold to him by Curly Bill through Guadalupe Canyon near the Mexican border. Around dawn after the first day and night on the trail, they were ambushed by Mexicans dispatched by Commandant Felipe Neri, in what was later dubbed the Guadalupe Canyon Massacre. Five men were killed in the ambush. Clanton, who was cooking breakfast when he was shot, fell dead into the cook-fire.

Drovers Harry Ernshaw and Billy Byers survived. Along with Dick Gray, who helped bury the dead, all said that the attackers were Mexican. The Byers family received a picture of Old Man Clanton from Ike and Phin Clanton, on the back of which they wrote, "Mr. Clanton killed on Aug 13—81 by Mexicans with 4 other Americans in Guadalupe Canon [sic] New Mexico." Both men signed the inscription. Another photograph of Will G. Lang, who was killed in the ambush, bears a similar inscription: "Will G. Lang killed by Mexicans—Animas Valley New Mexico Aug 13, 1881 together with Gray, Cranton, Clanton and Snow and Byers wounded." Along with Behan's involvement in King's escape, this was the beginning of increasingly bad feelings between the Earp and Cowboy factions.

Snow was buried where he fell due to decomposition. The others were taken back by wagon and buried about ten miles east of Cloverdale, New Mexico.

== Reburial ==
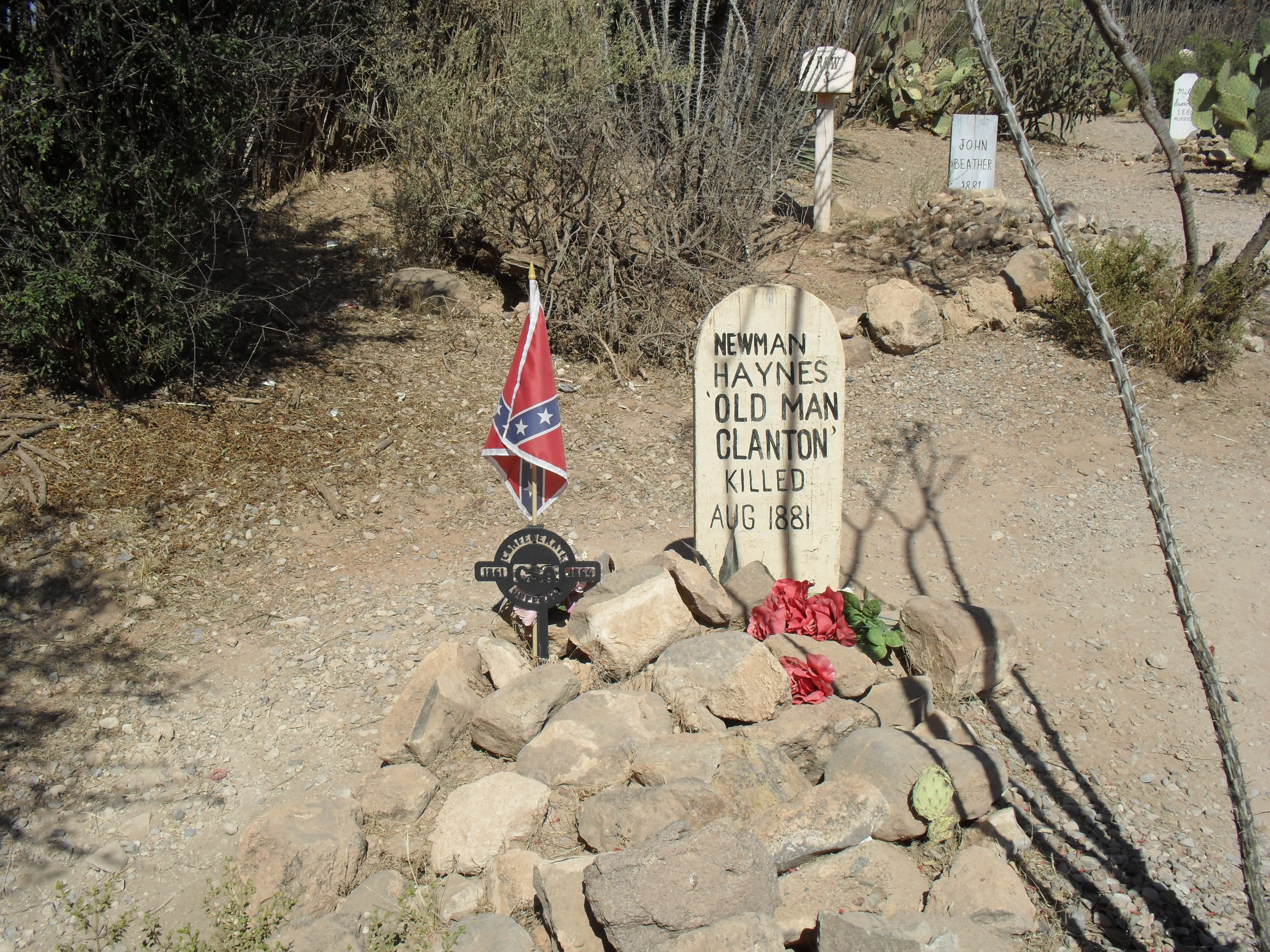
Grave in Tombstone

In 1882, Ike and Phin Clanton exhumed their father's body. They moved it to the Boot Hill cemetery in Tombstone, where he was re-interred alongside his youngest son, Billy Clanton, who had been killed two months after his father's death, in the gunfight at the O.K. Corral.

In the summer of 1887, Ike Clanton was indicted for cattle rustling and was killed resisting arrest in a gunfight with law enforcement officers. His unmarked grave, near present-day Eaglecreek in Greenlee County, Arizona, may have been located by a descendant in 1996. He unsuccessfully proposed to Tombstone town officials that the remains should be exhumed and reburied near Newman Haynes and Billy Clanton's graves at Boot Hill in Tombstone.

Newman's second son, Phineas ("Fin") Clanton, survived the cattle wars. He was convicted of cattle rustling and served seventeen months in prison. After his release, he ran a goat ranch and married. He was later involved in a wagon accident. He died of pneumonia in 1905. He is buried in Globe, Arizona.

== In popular culture ==
In the 1946 Henry Fonda movie, My Darling Clementine, the part of "Old Man Clanton" is played by Walter Brennan. Unhistorically, he is killed at the end of the OK Corral gunfight (that took place two months after Old Man Clanton's death).

From 1958 to 1961, the actor Trevor Bardette played Clanton in twenty-one episodes of the ABC/Desilu fictionalized western television series, The Life and Legend of Wyatt Earp, with Hugh O'Brian as Wyatt Earp. Carol Thurston played his daughter Emma, though the real Clanton's daughters were named Mary Elise and Ester Ann.

In Call of Juarez: Gunslinger, Old Man Clanton is seen wielding a Gatling gun and is killed by the bounty hunter Silas Greaves.
