= McLaury =

McLaury is a surname. Notable people with the surname include:

- Frank McLaury (1849–1881), American gunslinger
- Tom McLaury (1853–1881), American gunslinger
