= Lewis Springs, Arizona =

- Populated place
- Location within the state of Arizona Lewis Springs (the United States)
- Coordinates: 31°34′52″N 110°08′31″W
- Country: United States
- State: Arizona
- County: Cochise
- Elevation: 4,049 ft (1,234 m)
- Time zone: UTC-7 (Mountain (MST))
  - Summer (DST): UTC-7 (MST)
- Area code: 520
- FIPS code: 04-40770
- GNIS feature ID: 24493

Lewis Springs, also called San Pedro Springs after the nearby San Pedro River, is a populated place situated in Cochise County, Arizona, United States.

== History ==
The site was originally named Fritz Springs, after Fritz Hoffman, who discovered the springs located on the site. Later, the area was purchased by Alpheus Lewis, whose son, Robert, renamed it in honor of his father in the late 1870s.

In 1878, Newman Haynes Clanton, known as "Old Man" Clanton, established a ranch in Lewis Springs. His two sons, Ike and Billy Clanton, were involved in the infamous Gunfight at the O.K. Corral, in nearby Tombstone.
