= Phineas Clanton =

American cowboy (1843–1906)

Phineas Fay Clanton
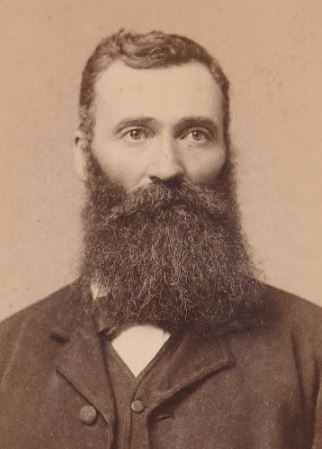
- Born: Phineas Fay Clanton; December 1843; Callaway County, Missouri, US
- Died: January 5, 1906 (aged 62); Webster Springs, Arizona, US
- Other name: "Phin" or "Fin"
- Occupations: Ranch hand, outlaw, rustler
- Spouse: Laura Jane (née Neal) Bound (or Bohme)
- Parent(s): Old Man Clanton and Mariah Sexton Kelso
- Relatives: Brothers Ike Clanton and Billy Clanton
- Status: Served one year and five months; pardoned
- Allegiance: The Cowboys
- Conviction: 1 count grand larceny
- Criminal charges: 15 counts grand larceny
- Penalty: 10 years

Phineas Fay Clanton (December 1843 – January 5, 1906) was the son of Newman Haynes Clanton and the brother of Billy and Ike Clanton. He was witness to and possibly played a part in a number of illegal activities during his life. He moved frequently in his early life from Missouri to California and to Arizona.

Their father was implicated in the ambush and murder of a number of Mexican smugglers in July 1881. The following month he was killed by Mexican Rurales. Phin's brother Ike Clanton had an ongoing series of conflicts with Deputy U.S. Marshal Virgil Earp and was accused of cattle rustling among other things. Phin and his brothers developed bitter and angry feelings for the Earps. During the Gunfight at the O.K. Corral on October 26, 1881, Ike escaped unharmed but their brother Billy was killed. Ike and Phin were accused of attempting to murder Virgil in December and assassinating Morgan Earp two months later, but Cowboy friends vouched for their presence in Contention, 12 miles (19 km) away.

Phin had numerous other brushes with the law during his life. He and his brother Ike moved to northern Arizona near their sister and her husband, Eben Stanley. The three men developed a reputation for stealing livestock. The grand jury indicted them and Ike was killed while resisting arrest. Phin served one year and five months of his 10-year prison term. He married late in life and four years later died after contracting pneumonia.

== Early life ==
"Phin" or "Fin" was born in Callaway County, Missouri, to Newman Haynes Clanton and Mariah Sexton Kelso. Phin had six siblings: John Wesley, Joseph Issac, William Harrison, Alonzo Peter, Mary Elise and Ester Ann. The family moved frequently during his youth, from Missouri to Adams County, Illinois, in 1851 and then to Dallas, Texas, in 1853. The Clantons had repeated scrapes with the law. Both Newman and his oldest son John Wesley were convicted of desertion during the Civil War. They developed a reputation for theft and thuggery that followed them to Arizona. When Phin was 20, the family moved again to Fort Bowie, Arizona Territory and then the next year to San Buenaventura and after that to Port Hueneme, California.

In 1869, at 24 years old, Phin was living in Lone Pine, California, with his oldest brother John Wesley Clanton and his wife Nancy.

Four years later he returned to the Arizona Territory in 1873 to the Gila River valley to help his father Newman Haynes Clanton build up Clantonville, a farming community his father founded in Gila Valley, Arizona. His father purchased or squatted on a large tract of land outside Camp Thomas, but his plans for a new town failed to materialize. His father resumed cattle ranching and most of his children later followed him to Arizona.

== Ranching in Charleston ==
In 1877, Phin moved with his father about 100 miles (160 km) south to land on the San Pedro River, about 8 miles (13 km) up river from Charleston, Arizona Territory. There he helped build a large adobe house which became the headquarters of the Clanton Ranch. Phin also obtained work as a freight driver. During the same time period, prospector Ed Schieffelin discovered silver in the hills east of the San Pedro River on a plateau known as Goose Flats, less than 15 miles (24 km) from the Clanton ranch. The family was very well situated to meet the demands for beef from the booming town of Tombstone. From its founding in March 1879, it grew from 100 residents to upwards of 15,000 citizens at its peak less than a decade later. When the mines built stamping mills on the San Pedro River about 5 miles (8.0 km) south of their ranch, a town named Charleston was built up to support them, providing the Clantons with another market for their beef.

Phin's father was implicated in the First Skeleton Canyon Massacre in July 1881, and a month later "Old Man" Clanton was killed while driving a herd of stolen cattle through Guadalupe Canyon near the Mexican border. Old Man Clanton was buried where he died. In 1882 Phin and Ike exhumed their father's body and moved it to the Boot Hill cemetery in Tombstone. Newman Clanton was re-interred alongside his son Billy Clanton who had been killed in the Gunfight at the O.K. Corral.

== Conflict with Earps ==
Phin's brother Billy was killed during the Gunfight at the O.K. Corral. Ike Clanton filed murder charges against Deputy U.S. Marshal and Tombstone Police chief Virgil Earp, Assistant Marshal Morgan Earp, and temporary deputies Wyatt Earp and Doc Holliday, but they were exonerated after a contentious month-long preliminary hearing. Ike attempted to re-file murder charges in Contention, but his move was rejected for lack of new evidence. On December 28, 1881, Virgil Earp was ambushed and seriously wounded by hidden assailants. Virgil was left without use of his left arm. Phin and his brother Ike were both arrested for the attempted murder, but Cowboy friends bore witness that they had both been in Charleston, about 12 miles (19 km) away when the shooting took place, and they were released.

Wyatt was appointed Deputy U.S. Marshal in Virgil's place. Wyatt deputized several men who guarded Virgil and his wife Allie on their way to Tucson and a train ride back to Colton, California, and their parent's home where he could recuperate in safety. In Tucson, Wyatt spotted Frank Stilwell lying in wait near the railroad tracks and killed him. Pima County Sheriff Bob Paul issued a warrant for their arrest. When Cochise County Sheriff Johnny Behan received the warrant, he assembled his own posse composed of friends of Frank Stilwell and Ike Clanton, including Phin, Pete Spence, Johnny Ringo, Johnny Barnes and about 18 more men. They rode after the federal posse and the five men wanted for Stilwell's murder. The Cochise County posse tracked Wyatt Earp's Federal posse as it was looking for the Cowboys who had attacked his brothers, seeking vengeance, but the two posses never met during the two-week-long pursuit.

Behan's posse almost caught up with the Earp posse on the morning of March 27 at the Sierra Bonita ranch of Henry C. Hooker, a wealthy and prominent rancher. When Behan's men were spotted in the distance, Hooker suggested Wyatt make his stand there, but Wyatt moved into the hills about three miles distant near Reilly Hill. When Sheriff Behan and his posse arrived at the Sierra Bonita ranch, Hooker refused them assistance. One report said Hooker told Behan where to look for the Earps but the posse left in the opposite direction.

== Raises cattle and goats ==
In June 1882 Phin moved 200 miles (320 km) north to Springerville, Apache County, where his sister Mary Elsie lived with her husband Eben Stanley, a recipient of the Medal of Honor while fighting with the 5th U.S. Cavalry under General George Crook. Ike Clanton arrived in August. By 1885, both brothers had bought a quarter-section of land (160 acres (65 ha)) 10 miles east of Springerville near the New Mexico border. Eben assisted Phin and Ike in getting their cattle business started.

Two years later, on December 27, 1885, the Apache County treasurer’s office was broken into. Deputy Treasurer Francisco Baca claimed that although the robbers were masked, he recognized the men as Phin and Ike Clanton, Eben Stanley and Lee Renfro of Springerville, and Mr. Buck Henderson of St. Johns. During the trial the court found that Baca had made up the story to cover his embezzling activities. He was later tried and convicted of stealing $11,166.54.

== Phin and Ike indicted ==
Stanley and the two Clanton brothers were suspected of stealing cattle from the Springerville area and taking them south via the Blue River to Clifton, Arizona, and other southern towns to sell. The "Clanton-Stanley outfits" were regarded as rustlers and had been a "terror for years". Apache County Sheriff Perry Owens and the local Stock Association decided to pursue indictments against them.

On March 1, 1887, George Powell testified before the grand jury implicating Ike, Phin, Eben, Charles Gray, Robert Gray, and Lee Renfro in livestock theft. An arrest warrant for Lee Renfro had already been issued on February 26 for the shooting death in November 1886 of Isaac Ellenger at Phin's Cienega Amarilla Ranch. Phin had allegedly given Renfro a horse to enable his escape. The grand jury returned 15 indictments the same day accusing Phin of grand larceny.

Phin was arrested and jailed on April 30. During May more livestock were stolen and on May 14 deputies Albert Millet, George Powell and Detective Jonas V. Brighton left Springerville, Arizona to track down the stolen horses and mules. They followed the trail to "Peg-leg" Jim Wilson's ranch on Eagle Creek. They arrived on the evening of May 31 and spent the night. Early the next morning Ike Clanton rode up to the door on horseback. When the lawmen answered his knock, he immediately recognized them. He turned his horse to flee and withdrew his rifle from his scabbard. Detective Brighton shot Ike through the heart and he died before he hit the ground. On July 8 Renfro was found and was also killed while resisting arrest.

In September 1887 Phin was found guilty and was sentenced to 10 years in the Yuma Arizona State Prison. While serving his sentence, it was discovered that the prosecution’s primary witness that led to Phin’s conviction had lied on the stand so he could collect the $250 reward. On March 15, 1889, after serving only one year and five months, he was pardoned by Governor Meyer Zulick and was released on March 24, 1889.

After his release, Phin and his friend Pete Spence began raising Angora goats on what is now the Bohme Allotment on Phin’s ranch in Globe, Arizona. In 1891, a Clifton newspaper mistakenly reported that Phin had been shot and killed by Ballard Peason at St. John.

On May 15, 1894, Phin Clanton was arrested by Sheriff John Henry Thompson for robbing Sam Kee, a Chinese gardener in Wheatfields, at gunpoint. Kee said Phin stole a gold watch valued at $40, two bars of silver bullion, each valued at $15, one gold bracelet valued at $20 and $320 in cash. Clanton was acquitted on May 22, 1894.

On October 15, 1902, at age 58, Clanton married 44-year-old Laura Jane (née Neal) Bound (or Bohme) in Globe, Arizona. She had a 12-year-old son from her first marriage to William Jackson.

== Accident and death ==
On January 5, 1906, Phineas was involved in a wagon accident and developed a fatal case of pneumonia. He died at the age of 62 in Webster Springs and was buried in the Globe Cemetery.

His widow Laura Jane did wash at the mining company's guest house and took in boarders. Sixteen-year-old Will found work for a freight company driving mule teams that hauled ore from the Continental Mine to the Old Dominion. The wagon tracks are still visible in the rocks west of the Bohme Ranch on Webster Gulch. Every payday, Will bought another cow. He and Jane ran cattle on the range subsequently designated the Bohme Allotment by the U.S. Forest Service. Four years later Laura married Phin’s friend and business associate Pete Spence.
