= Cochise County Cowboys =

Informal confederation of rustlers and robbers in Old West Arizona

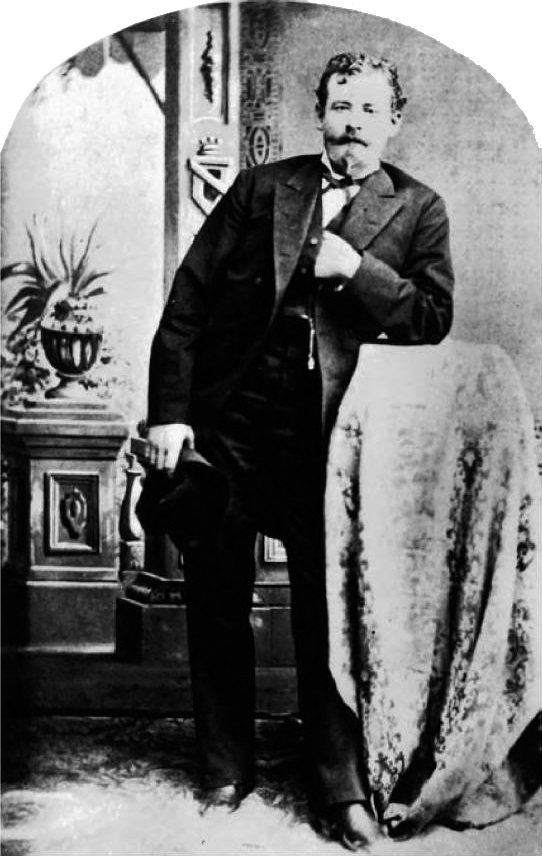
- An outlaw cowboy, Ike Clanton
- Named after: Cowboy
- Years active: 1870s–1880s
- Territory: Cochise County
- Membership: apprx. 200-300
- Activities: Criminal organization
- Rivals: Earp Brothers

The Cochise County Cowboys is the modern name for a loosely associated group of outlaws living in Pima and Cochise Counties in Arizona in the late 19th century. The term "cowboy", as opposed to "cowhand," had only begun to come into wider use during the 1870s. In that place and time, "cowboy" was synonymous with "cattle rustler" and did not have the later association of cowboys as those who worked with ranchers and cattle. Such thieves frequently rode across the border into Mexico and stole cattle from Mexican ranches that they then drove back across the border to sell in the United States. Some modern writers consider them to be an early form of organized crime in America.

In response, the Mexican government eventually lowered tariffs and added forts along the border, making cross-border rustling and smuggling less attractive. The Cowboys then began to steal cattle and horses from neighboring American ranches, reselling them to unscrupulous butchers. They held up stagecoaches, stole the strongboxes, and strong-armed passengers for their valuables. In some instances, they killed drivers and passengers.

== Origins and background ==
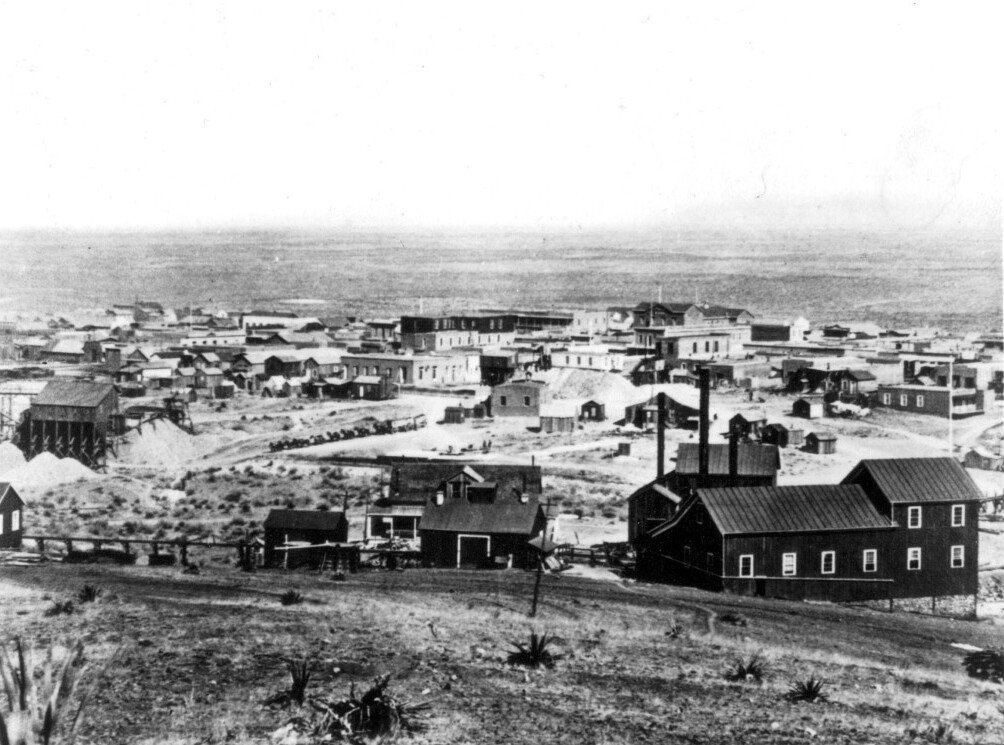
Tombstone in 1881: The town had a population of about 4,000 with 600 dwellings and two church buildings.

Tombstone, Arizona, was one of the last frontier towns in the American Old West. Outlaws from all parts of the western territories felt the pressures of encroaching civilization and the increased presence of lawmen and the courts, backed by growing populations of farmers and citizens desiring law and order. The town had boomed in less than 18 months from about 100 miners living in tents and shacks to more than 7,000 people by December 1, 1879, when Virgil, Wyatt, and Morgan Earp arrived in Tombstone.

Virgil Earp had been appointed deputy U.S. marshal for eastern Pima County in Prescott and was directed to relocate to Tombstone to concentrate on suppressing the Cowboys' illegal activities. He arrived with his brothers Wyatt and Morgan. Wyatt looked for business opportunities. When those did not work out, he started riding shotgun for Wells, Fargo & Co., guarding their silver bullion shipments. He was appointed as a Pima County deputy sheriff from June 1880 until November of that year, and Virgil Earp was hired as Tombstone's city marshal in June 1881.

=== Cowboys as outlaws ===
The word cowboy did not begin to come into wider use until the 1870s. The men who drove cattle for a living were usually called cowhands, drovers, or stockmen. While cowhands were still respected in West Texas, in Cochise County the outlaws' crimes and their notoriety grew such that during the 1880s it was an insult to call a legitimate cattleman a "cowboy." Tombstone resident George Parsons wrote in his diary, "A cowboy is a rustler at times, and a rustler is a synonym for desperado—bandit, outlaw, and horse thief." The San Francisco Examiner wrote in an editorial, "Cowboys [are] the most reckless class of outlaws in that wild country ... infinitely worse than the ordinary robber." Legal cowmen were usually landowners and generally called herders or ranchers.

The term cow-boy, once applied to all those in the cattle business indiscriminately, while still including some honest persons, has been narrowed down to be chiefly a term of reproach for a class of stealers of cattle, over the Mexican frontier, and elsewhere, who are a terror in their day and generation. There were said to be strongholds in the San Simon Valley where the bandits concealed stolen cattle until they were rebranded and sent to market, and where no officer of the law dared to venture. They looked upon rustling cattle from Mexico only as a more dashing form of smuggling, though it was marked by frequent bloody conflicts on both sides.

On September 16, 1881, forty days before the Gunfight at the O.K. Corral, The Tombstone Epitaph wrote about the "Cow-boy Nuisance" in Arizona:

It has come to pass in this county that life and personal property are unsafe; even in the town of Tombstone it seems as if one of the leading industries is to be destroyed. There is not a teamster to-day who is not in fear and dread of the cow-boys, or so-styled "rustlers" depriving him of his hard earnings... How must such men feel to be robbed by a hand of thieves and cutthroats, who take pride in announcing to the public that they are "rustlers!" Where is the teamsters protection? Can you find any officers who will follow, arrest and recover your property? If you can, I would like to see him... These chaps seem to have no difficulty in evading the law, while others, not inclined to work, daily join the band and they are increasing fast in numbers. Our town is filled with spies watching every move of the officers and imparting their information to their comrades... Men who come to examine different mines outside of town, when they learn how the cow-boys stand fellows up, do not wish to run such risks; they quietly take the road they came and get into civilization as soon as possible.

The notoriety and power of the Cowboys spread from coast to coast. Well-known members of the group included Ike, Billy, and Phineas Clanton, Frank and Tom McLaury, Curly Bill Brocius, Billy Claiborne, Calico Jones, Johnny Ringo, Frank Stilwell, Pony Diehl, Pete Spence, and Harry Head. Virgil Earp thought that some of the Cowboys had met at Charleston, Arizona, and taken "an oath over blood drawn from the arm of Ringo, the leader, that they would kill us." Three Cowboys were killed by lawmen in the Gunfight at the O.K. Corral on October 26, 1881. Others were later accused of trying to kill Virgil Earp and of assassinating Morgan Earp. Wyatt Earp's posse killed four more Cowboys when they ran down those identified as taking part in the attacks on his brothers.

Virgil Earp told the Arizona Daily Star on May 30, 1882, that:

They know that Arizona is about the only place left for them to operate in as an organization. With a complete breaking up of their company threatened in event of losing their hold where they are now, they resist official interference with the greatest desperation.

He estimated that the Cowboys numbered nearly 200, and that during his time in Cochise Territory about 50 had been killed. A modern estimate puts the number of Cowboys at about 300. Many modern writers consider them to be one of the first and earliest forms of organized crime syndicates in American history.

== Cowboys vs. business owners ==
Many of the ranchers and cowboys who lived in the countryside were resentful of the growing power of industrialists from northern states, who increasingly influenced local politics and law in the county. The ranchers largely maintained control of the country around Tombstone, in large part because of the sympathetic support of Cochise County Sheriff Johnny Behan, who favored the Cowboys and rural ranchers. He grew to intensely dislike the Earps. Behan tended to ignore the Earps' complaints about the McLaurys' and Clantons' horse thieving and cattle rustling. As officers of the law, the Earps were known to bend the law in their favor when it affected their gambling and saloon interests, which earned them further enmity from the Cowboy faction.

=== Political and regional conflicts ===
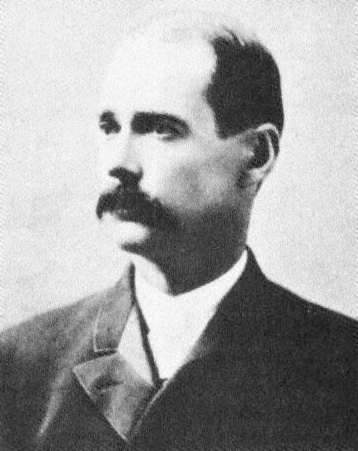
Cochise County Sheriff Johnny Behan was aligned with the Cowboys

Under the surface were other tensions aggravating the simmering distrust. Most of the Cowboys were Democrats and Confederate sympathizers from southern states, especially Texas. They considered the business owners and the lawmen, especially the Earps, to be Northern Republican carpetbaggers.

=== Economic conflicts ===
According to Virgil Earp, the Cowboys were "saddlers", men who lived in the saddle. Their primary occupation was raiding haciendas in Sonora, Mexico, for cattle. They sold the cattle in Tombstone to cooperative butchers. When they couldn't find cattle to steal, they robbed stages and engaged "in similar enterprises". He said that as soon as they had money to spend, they roared into Tombstone to spend it freely in the saloons, brothels, and "faro banks".

The Cowboys' generous spending habits earned them friends among the businessmen in town, who welcomed them. There the Cowboys freely expressed their opinions publicly, loudly, and with little opposition. When the Cowboys broke the law, the businessmen feared alienating their customers and hesitated to support lawmen when they confronted cattle thieves or stage robbers. Virgil Earp said that a lawman "doing his duty must rely almost entirely upon his own conscience for encouragement. The sympathy of the respectable portion of the community may be with him but it is not openly expressed."

== Known criminal associates ==
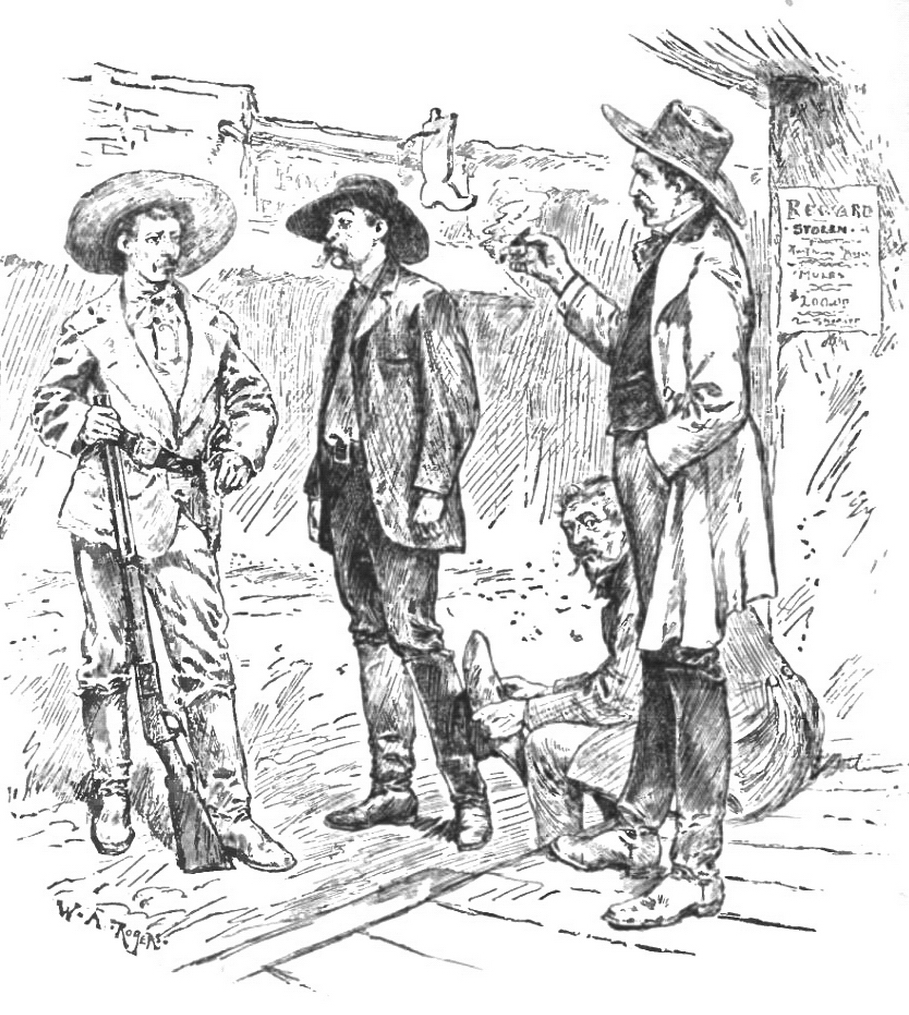
Tombstone sheriff and constituents, an illustration from Mexico, California and Arizona; Being a New and Revised Edition of Old Mexico and Her Lost Provinces

The lines were not always distinct between the outlaw element and law enforcement. Doc Holliday had a reputation as a killer. He was friends with Bill Leonard, who was implicated in a stagecoach robbery.

On March 15, 1881, three Cowboys tried to rob a Kinnear & Company stagecoach carrying US$26,000 in silver bullion (about $867,414 in today's dollars) near Drew's Station, just outside Contention City. It was en route from Tombstone to Benson, Arizona, the nearest rail terminal. The Cowboys were later identified as Bill Leonard, Harry "The Kid" Head, and Jim Crane, assisted by Luther King.

The brothers Frank and Tom McLaury had a ranch outside Tombstone, which they may have used to receive and sell stolen Mexican cattle. When six U.S. Army mules were stolen from Camp Rucker by Calico Jones and an unknown accomplice (some sources say it may have been Ike Clanton), Wyatt Earp assisted the U.S. Army in a search. They found the animals on the McLaurys' ranch on the Babacomari River. They also found the branding iron used to change the "US" brand to "D8". Frank Patterson and other Cowboys promised to return the mules but showed up two days later without the animals and laughed at the lawmen.

Pony Diehl was mentioned in the records of the events leading up to and after the Gunfight at the O.K. Corral. He was suspected of involvement in numerous robberies and cattle rustling and of involvement in the theft of US Army mules, along with Sherman McMaster. McMaster had been a Texas Ranger in 1878–79, during which time his unit captured and held Curly Bill Brocius as prisoner for five months. He was also accused of stealing U.S. Army mules and of robbing a stage with outlaw Pony Diehl.

The Clanton family, led by Newman Haynes Clanton, had a ranch in a valley outside Tombstone that was likely used for selling stolen Mexican beef. He was assisted by his sons Ike, Billy, and Phin Clanton. Old Man Clanton was involved in the robbery, murder, and torture of a number of Mexican smugglers who were ambushed on their way to Tucson in the 1879 Skeleton Canyon Massacre. He was killed on August 13, 1881, by Mexican soldiers in a retaliatory raid along the Mexican border at Guadalupe Canyon. Ike Clanton repeatedly threatened the Earps and Doc Holliday in the days leading up to the shoot-out on October 26 at the OK Corral. Unarmed, he ran from the gunfight.

== Cowboys and the law ==
Frank Stilwell had previously been accused and acquitted of two murders. He was named a deputy county sheriff by Cochise County Sheriff Johnny Behan in April 1881. He was dismissed four months later for "accounting irregularities" relating to the collection of taxes. Law enforcement officers who came into conflict with the Cowboys included Fred White, who was killed by Curly Bill Brocius in what was ruled an accidental shooting. Virgil Earp was at times both U.S. Deputy Marshal for the Southeast Arizona Territory and Tombstone City Marshal. Wyatt Earp had been the Pima County deputy sheriff from June to November 1880.

On June 28, 1881, Virgil was appointed by Tombstone Mayor John Clum as the permanent Tombstone City Marshal and was paid $150.00 per month. He was to enforce all town ordinances, including the city's ban against carrying a deadly weapon. John J. Gosper, Secretary of State for the Arizona Territory and acting governor after John C. Frémont's virtual abandonment of his post, interviewed both Sheriff Behan and Deputy U.S. Marshal (and Town Marshal) Virgil Earp. Behan and Earp blamed each other for failing to bring the Cowboys under control. In a report to Washington, D.C., in September 1881, Gosper expressed his dismay with both lawmen:

The cowboy element at times very fully predominates, and the officers of the law are either unable or unwilling to control this class of outlaws, sometimes being governed by fear, at other times by a hope of reward. At Tombstone, the county seat of Cochise County, I conferred with the Sheriff upon the subject of breaking up these bands of outlaws, and I am sorry to say he gave me but little hope of being able in his department to cope with the power of the cowboys. He represented to me that the Deputy U.S. Marshal, resident of Tombstone, and the city Marshal for the same, seemed unwilling to heartily cooperate with him in capturing and bringing to justice these outlaws.

In conversation with the Deputy US Marshal, Mr. Earp, I found precisely the same spirit of complaint existing against Mr. Behan (the Sheriff) and his deputies. Many of the very best law-abiding and peace-loving citizens have no confidence in the willingness of the civil officers to pursue and bring to justice that element of outlawry so largely disturbing the sense of security, and so often committing highway robbery and smaller thefts. The opinion in Tombstone and elsewhere in that part of the Territory is quite prevalent that the civil officers are quite largely in league with the leaders of this disturbing and dangerous element.

Something must be done, and that right early, or very grave results will follow. It is an open disgrace to American liberty and the peace and security of her citizens, that such a state of affairs should exist.

=== Weapon ordinance ===
To counter the ongoing problems with weapons in Tombstone, the biggest city in the county and the county seat, its city council passed an ordinance on April 19, 1881, that prohibited carrying a deadly weapon in town. It required everyone to deposit weapons at a livery or saloon soon after entering town. As City Marshal, Virgil Earp was charged with enforcing this ordinance.

Effective April 19, 1881, Tombstone City Ordinance Number 9 states:

To Provide against Carrying of Deadly Weapons

Section 1. It is hereby declared unlawful to carry in the hand or upon the person or otherwise any deadly weapon within the limits of said city of Tombstone, without first obtaining a permit in writing.

Section 2: This prohibition does not extend to persons immediately leaving or entering the city, who, with good faith, and within reasonable time are proceeding to deposit, or take from the place of deposit such deadly weapon.

Section 3: All fire-arms of every description, and bowie knives and dirks, are included within the prohibition of this ordinance.

The initial version of Ordinance No. 9, in effect in April, 1880 unintentionally allowed individuals to carry deadly weapons in plain sight, only banning concealed weapons. It had little effect and the later version was passed with the intent to prevent carrying any deadly weapons without a permit. The revised version was in effect when Virgil Earp attempted to disarm the cowboys before the Gunfight at the OK Corral.

After the gunfight on October 26, 1881, in which three Cowboys died, the Earps and Holliday had to defend themselves against murder charges filed by Ike Clanton. The defendants cited the weapons ordinance during the preliminary hearing held by Justice Wells Spicer. In his ruling exonerating the lawmen of murder, Judge Spicer described Frank McLaury's insistence that he would not give up his weapons unless the marshal and his deputies also gave up their arms as a "proposition both monstrous and startling!"

=== Earp and the Cowboys conflict ===
Virgil Earp had been appointed the Deputy U.S. Marshal for eastern Pima County on November 27, 1880, before he arrived in Tombstone. Wyatt Earp was appointed assistant sheriff for Pima County from July 27 to November 9, 1880. After Town Marshal Fred White was killed on October 30, 1880, Virgil was appointed to replace him, gaining the position permanently on June 2, 1881. He hired his brother Morgan as a deputy town marshal and occasionally called on Wyatt for assistance.

The Earps had repeated conflicts with some of the Cowboys, particularly Ike Clanton, Frank McLaury, and Tom McLaury. This tension eventually resulted in the Gunfight at the O.K. Corral, on October 26, 1881. Frank, Tom, and Billy Clanton were killed during that shootout.

Most historians have considered the McLaurys and the Clantons to be outlaw cowboys. Billy Claiborne fled the Tombstone gunfight and later claimed he was unarmed. Frank McLaury was known as a good shot. Ike Clanton was not well liked because of his drunkenness. His brother Billy was considered level-headed and hard-working. Some townspeople were particularly fond of young Tom McLaury. Billy Clanton and the McLaurys were landowners and commanded some respect in town. The men were so popular that the Nuggett said after the gunfight that the Cowboys' funeral "was the largest ever witnessed in Tombstone."

=== Virgil Earp maimed ===
At about 11:30 pm on December 28, 1881, Virgil Earp was ambushed on the streets of Tombstone by hidden assailants shooting from the second story of an unfinished building as he walked from the Oriental Saloon to his room. The Sacramento Daily Record-Union reported that "he was fired upon with double-barreled shotguns, loaded with buckshot, by three men concealed in an unfinished building diagonally across on Allen street."

Virgil was hit in the back and left arm by three loads of buckshot from about 60 feet (18 m). The Crystal Palace Saloon and the Eagle Brewery beyond Virgil were struck by nineteen buckshot; three passed through the window and one about a foot over the heads of some men standing by a faro-table. George Parsons wrote that he heard "four shots in quick succession." Critically wounded, Virgil staggered into the hotel. "One shot struck him above the groin, coming out near the spine." The humerus bone in his upper arm was longitudinally fractured. The Los Angeles Daily Herald reported that the "cow-boys are bent on vengeance for the slaughter of their compañeros a few weeks ago." "The doctor says there are four chances in five that he will die." Virgil upper left arm was shattered, and a doctor removed 5.5 inches (140 mm) of humerus bone and his elbow, leaving his arm useless. The Sacramento Daily Record-Union wrote that "Long ago the cowboy gang threatened the lives of Mayor Clum, Judge Spicer, Marshall Williams, agent of Wells, Fargo & Co., Earp and Holliday, and this is an attempt to carry the threats into execution."

=== Morgan Earp assassinated ===
At 10:50 pm on Saturday, March 18, 1882, after returning from a musical at Schieffelin Hall, Morgan Earp was playing a late round of billiards at the Campbell & Hatch Billiard Parlor against owner Bob Hatch. Dan Tipton, Sherman McMaster, and Wyatt watched, having received threats that same day.

An assailant shot Morgan through the upper half of a four-pane windowed door that opened onto a dark alley. Morgan, about 10 feet (3.0 m) from the door, was struck in the right side and the bullet shattered his spine, passed through his left side, and entered the thigh of mining foreman George A. B. Berry. Another bullet lodged in the wall near the ceiling over Wyatt's head. Several men rushed into the alley but found the shooter had fled.

After Morgan was shot, his brothers tried to help him stand, but Morgan said "Don't, I can't stand it. This is the last game of pool I'll ever play." Morgan died less than an hour after he was shot.

=== Earp vendetta ===
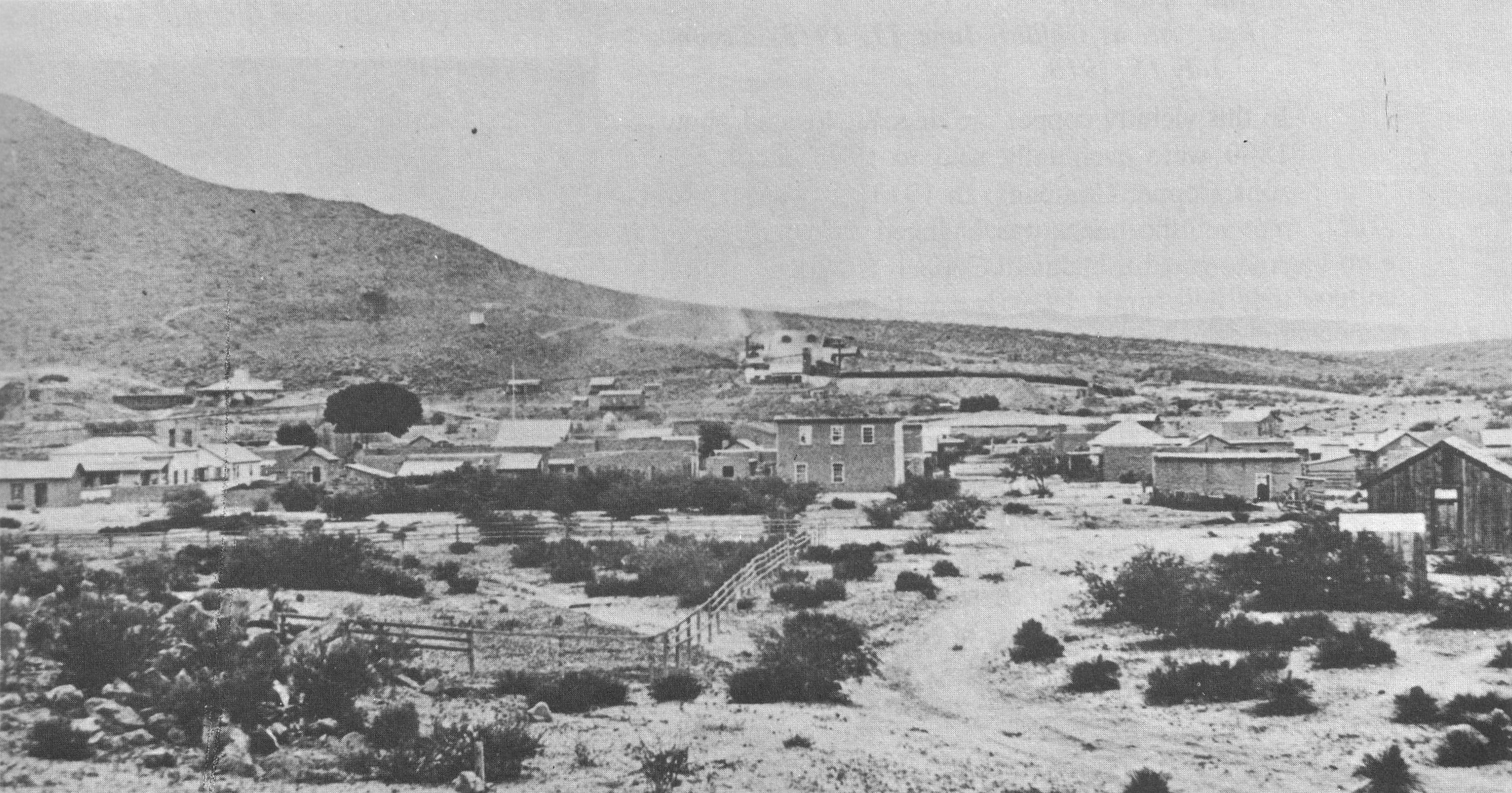
Wyatt Earp first sought the Cowboys who ambushed Virgil Earp in Charleston, Cochise County, seen here in 1885.

The main suspects in the ambush of Virgil Earp were Ike and Phin Clanton, and Pony Diehl. Wyatt was appointed as Deputy U.S. Marshal to replace Virgil; in turn, he deputized Sherman McMaster, "Turkey Creek" Jack Johnson, Origen Charles Smith and Daniel "Tip" Tipton. On January 23, 1882, Wyatt Earp obtained arrest warrants for Ike and Phin Clanton and Pony Diehl and led his posse after them. The lawmen searched in Charleston but were unsuccessful. Ike's hat had been found at the scene of Virgil's shooting, but on February 2, 1882, seven Cowboys provided him with an alibi, saying that he was in Charleston at the time. Charges were dismissed for lack of evidence.

Pete Spence, Frederick Bode, Frank Stilwell, "Indian Charlie" Cruz, and one other individual were identified as suspects in Morgan's murder. The judge could not indict them because the primary witness was Spence's wife, giving him protection under the law on spousal privilege. The Cowboys went free.

Wyatt decided he had to take matters into his own hands. Newly named as Deputy US Marshal to replace Virgil, he assembled a posse including Warren Earp, Doc Holliday, and several cowboys. "Turkey Creek" Jack Johnson and Sherman McMaster guarded Virgil on his way to the train station in Tucson. The posse found Frank Stilwell lying in wait and killed him. A second person, possibly Ike Clanton, was also seen but escaped. When Pima County issued warrants for the arrest of the Earps in the murder of Frank Stilwell in the Tucson railyards, Sheriff Behan deputized Johnny Ringo, Pete Spence, Johnny Barnes and about 17 other Cowboys to pursue and arrest the Earps. They were unsuccessful.

Bat Masterson and Luke Short were faro dealers for Wyatt for a while at the Oriental Saloon, but both left in April 1881. Lou Rickabaugh, the owner of the Oriental Saloon, was also from Dodge City. Other known Cowboys included Billy Claiborne, Curly Bill Brocius, Johnny Ringo, Frank Patterson, Milt Hicks, Bill Hicks, Bill Johnson, Ed Lyle, and Johnny Lyle. In February 1882, Diehl was running from the law, as a warrant was issued for his arrest relating to a January 1882 stagecoach robbery. He eventually was arrested for numerous crimes, including cattle rustling and robbery, and was convicted and sentenced to five years in prison at Santa Fe, New Mexico. He escaped in February 1885 but was recaptured after four days. He was returned to prison and not released until March 1887, at which point his name disappeared from public records; by some accounts he died in a gunfight.

== Aftermath ==
With the deaths of several Cowboy leaders and the departure of the Earp family, the dominance of the outlaw cowboys waned. Arizona Territory Governor Frederick Tritle visited Tombstone on April 3, 1882, and put a posse of 30 men under the command of Deputy U.S. Marshal J.H. Jackson. Because Arizona was still a territory, Congress approved all of its expenditures. Tritle telegraphed President Chester A. Arthur and asked for an appropriation of $150,000 from Congress to pay for the costs of rooting out the unlawful elements. He also asked for the power to suspend local officials for six months. The U.S. Congress was unwilling to allocate the funds needed to form such a group. Unable to create a group of rangers, Tritle instead called for the formation of volunteer militia to pursue hostile groups of Apache.

To combat the depredations of the outlaw cowboys, General William T. Sherman, following a tour of Arizona's eastern and southern counties, recommended suspension of the Posse Comitatus Act to allow the U.S. Army to aid in restoring order. On the basis of the recommendations of Sherman and Tritle, and following consultation with members of the U.S. Senate, President Arthur issued a decree on May 3, 1882, threatening to use military force if the criminal element did not disperse. The use of the U.S. Army to enforce the law was not necessary, as the outlaw cowboy problem diminished over the next few months.

== See also ==
- Ten Percent Ring
