= Pete Spence =

American outlaw (1852–1914)

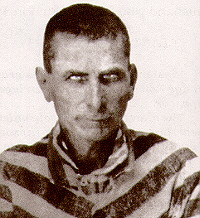
- Pete Spence in an 1883 prison mugshot. This is the only known photo of Spence.
- Born: Elliot Larkin Ferguson c. 1852; Texas
- Died: 1914 (aged 61–62); Globe, Arizona
- Occupations: Texas Ranger, stock raiser, outlaw Cowboy, lawman
- Status: Pardoned after 18 months
- Allegiance: Outlaw Cowboys
- Conviction: Manslaughter
- Criminal charges: Manslaughter
- Penalty: 10 years

Pete Spence (born Elliot Larkin Ferguson; c. 1852–1914) was a small-time criminal known for his association with outlaw Cowboys Frank and Tom McLaury, and Ike and Billy Clanton, of Tombstone, Arizona Territory. Spence was also a suspect in the assassination of Morgan Earp. His wife Marietta Duarte testified that Spence and several friends had talked about killing Morgan, but the judge ruled her testimony inadmissible. Spence was first suspected of robbery in 1878 in Goliad County, Texas. He was suspected of stealing mules and later a suspect in a stagecoach robbery outside Bisbee, Arizona. While a deputy sheriff, he pistol-whipped and killed a man for which he served 18 months of a five-year term before the governor pardoned him.

== Origins ==
In the 1880 Tombstone census he gave his age as 28, born in Texas, and listed his occupation as stock raiser. He was also reported as having been born in Louisiana in 1850. Little is known about his youth, but he enlisted in the Texas Rangers under Captain Wallace in 1874.

== From Texas to Arizona ==
Ferguson was wanted for robbery in Goliad Co., Texas in 1878 and left the area for the Arizona Territory near Bisbee and Tombstone where he began using the name of Peter M. Spencer. He was one of a number of outlaws from Texas who sought sanctuary on the American frontier and the wild west. Locally known as Cowboys, Tombstone resident George Parson wrote in his diary, "A Cowboy is a rustler at times, and a rustler is a synonym for desperado—bandit, outlaw, and horse thief.".

=== Life in Tombstone ===
Pete Spence's house as it stands today at the corner of Fremont and 1st Street in Tombstone

In Tombstone, Arizona Territory, Spence lived immediately across the street from the Earps in a house which still stands in Tombstone. For a time he ran Vogan's Saloon. In October, 1880 Spence was charged with grand larceny on a charge of possessing stolen Mexican mules, but was not convicted. Spence was a business partner of Frank Stilwell in the Franklin Mine and other mining ventures, and also in a Bisbee saloon. On August 12, 1881, he married Marietta Duarte.

=== Sandy Bob stage robbery ===
On September 8, 1881, a passenger stage on the Sandy Bob line in the Tombstone, Arizona area bound for Bisbee was held up by two masked men. They robbed all of the passengers of their valuables since the stage was not carrying a strongbox. During their robbery the driver heard one of the robbers describe the money as "sugar", a phrase known to be used by Frank Stilwell. Stilwell had until the prior month been a deputy for Sheriff Johnny Behan but had been fired for "accounting irregularities".

Deputy U.S. Marshal Virgil Earp assisted by his brother Wyatt and Sheriff's posse led by Behan attempted to track the Bisbee stage robbers. At the scene of the holdup, Wyatt discovered an unusual boot print left by someone wearing a custom-repaired boot heel. The Earps checked a shoe repair shop in Bisbee known to provide widened boot heels, and were able to link the boot print to Frank Stilwell. Stilwell had just arrived in Bisbee with Spence, his livery stable partner, and Virgil and Wyatt arrested both of them at the stable, for the stage robbery, on September 10. Cowboy friends provided Stilwell and Spence with an alibi, saying they were elsewhere during the robbery, and the state robbery charges were dropped.

Spence and Stilwell were re-arrested on October 13 by Virgil Earp for the Bisbee robbery on a new federal charge of interfering with a mail carrier. The Cowboys saw the Earp's filing of federal charges as further evidence they were being unfairly harassed and targeted by the Earps. They let the Earps know that they could expect retaliation. Local newspapers erroneously reported that Spence and Stilwell had been arrested for a different stage robbery that occurred on October 8 near Contention City. Stilwell was in jail in Tucson on these federal charges on the day of the gunfight on October 26, 1881, but Spence had been released several days before.

=== Role in killing Morgan Earp ===
At 10:50 p.m. on Saturday, March 18, 1882, Morgan Earp was shot by assailants who fired through a glass-windowed, locked door at the Campbell & Hatch Billiard Parlor in Tombstone. At the time, Morgan was playing a late round of billiards against owner Bob Hatch. The shooters narrowly missed Wyatt Earp, who was watching the game. Spence's wife, Marietta Duarte, testified at the coroner's inquest that her husband, Frank Stilwell, Frederick Bode, Florentino "Indian Charlie" Cruz, and a half-breed named Fries bragged about shooting Morgan. Her husband had threatened her with violence if she told what she knew.

The coroner's jury concluded that Spence and his accomplices were the suspects in Morgan's assassination. When she was called to testify at Spence's preliminary hearing, the defense objected because her testimony was hearsay and because a spouse could not testify against her husband. The judge agreed and dismissed the charges.

However, when Wyatt Earp learned of the coroner's jury findings, he took action on his own. After escorting the still recuperating Virgil to the rail road in Tucson, he found Frank Stilwell lying in wait and killed him. Assembling a federal posse, he set out to find and kill the remaining Cowboys whose friends' alibis or legal technicalities had gotten them off. Spence owned a ranch and woodcutting camp at South Pass in the Dragoon Mountains, where he employed Indian Charlie Cruz. Cruz was the lookout during the Morgan Earp shooting. On March 20, 1882, Wyatt Earp and a federal posse arrived at Spence's camp and asked for him. But Spence had turned himself in to Cochise County Sheriff Johnny Behan figuring he was safer behind bars. When the Earp posse learned Spence was in jail, they asked about Cruz. They soon found him and killed him.

=== Manslaughter conviction ===
In June 1883, Spence was working as a deputy sheriff in Georgetown, New Mexico, when he severely pistol-whipped Rodney O’Hara, killing him. He was convicted of manslaughter and sentenced to a five-year term in the Arizona Territorial Penitentiary. Less than 18 months later he was granted a full pardon by the territorial governor.

=== Later life ===
He operated a goat ranch south of Globe, Arizona near the Galiuro Mountains with his long-time friend, Phin Clanton, and ran mule teams to bring supplies into the Globe area. Phin Clanton died in 1906, and Spence married Phin's widow four years later on April 2, 1910, using his real name of Elliot Larkin Ferguson. He died in 1914 and is buried in the Globe, Arizona cemetery, in an unmarked plot next to Phin Clanton.

== Screen portrayals ==
Pete Spence was played by Michael Tolan in Hour of the Gun (1967), and by Kirk Fox in Wyatt Earp (1994).
