= William L. Brooks =

American lawman and outlaw (died 1874)

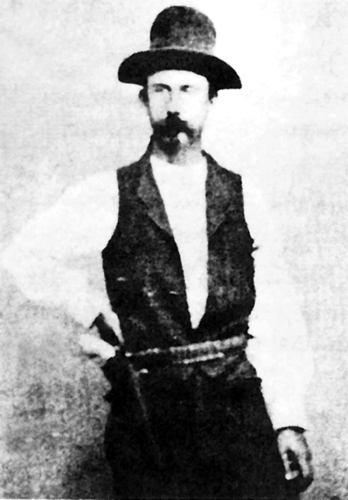
- Born: William L. Brooks c. 1832; Ohio, United States
- Died: July 29, 1874 (aged 41–42); Caldwell, Kansas, United States
- Cause of death: Lynching by hanging
- Other name: Buffalo Bill
- Occupations: Stage driver, gunfighter, lawman, gambler
- Criminal charges: Theft

William L. "Buffalo Bill" Brooks (c. 1832 – July 29, 1874) was a western lawman and later outlaw.

Brooks was born in Ohio around 1832 where he later became a buffalo hunter in the late-1840s or early-1850s whose success equaled fellow buffalo hunter William F. Cody earning the same nickname of Buffalo Bill. During the late 1860s, Brooks had killed several men in various gunfights, and was briefly hired as a stage driver for the Southwestern Stage Co., before becoming the marshal of Newton, Kansas in 1872. Although he was reported to have been around 40 years old, several biographers have claimed Brooks was in his 20s.

With Brooks' success in Newton he was soon offered a position in Dodge City as town marshal where he was later involved in 15 gunfights during his first month. In one case one of the men killed had four brothers who came after Brooks in revenge. As the brothers arrived in town Brooks was said to have killed all four men with four shots each. By the following year Brooks had cleared the city of most major criminals. Brooks however killed several men in questionable circumstances including one incident where he killed a man over an argument with a local dance hall girl. After backing down from gunfighter Kirk Jordan, Brooks left town shortly after.

According to legend, Brooks went to Butte, Montana where he attempted to become the city marshal but, in part because of Brook's reputation, was instead passed over in favor of Morgan Earp. Confronting Earp over his defeat, Brooks was shot in the stomach and Morgan was shot in the shoulder.

Records show however that, shortly after leaving Dodge City, Brooks returned to his old position as a stage driver for the Southwestern Stage Co. in early 1874. Several months later however the company had lost a mail contract to a rival company and Brooks lost his job. In June several mules and horses owned by the rival company had been stolen and Brooks, with two other men, were arrested the next month. It was charged that Brooks had apparently attempted to weaken the rival company and win back the mail contract for the Southwestern Stage Company. Brooks was lynched while awaiting trial on July 29, 1874.

== Bibliography ==
- Sifakis, Carl. Encyclopedia of American Crime, New York, Facts on File Inc., 1982
