= Iron Springs (Cochise County, Arizona) =

Waterbody

Coordinates: 31°44′40″N 110°25′40″W

Iron Springs is the historical name of a natural spring in the Whetstone Mountains of southeastern Arizona. It is famous for being the site of a confrontation between Wyatt Earp and William "Curly Bill" Brocius on March 24, 1882, which resulted in Brocius' death. The site was then known as Iron Springs, but on later maps the designation is Mescal Springs.

== See also ==
- Earp Vendetta Ride
