= Frank McLaury =

American gunman (1849–1881)

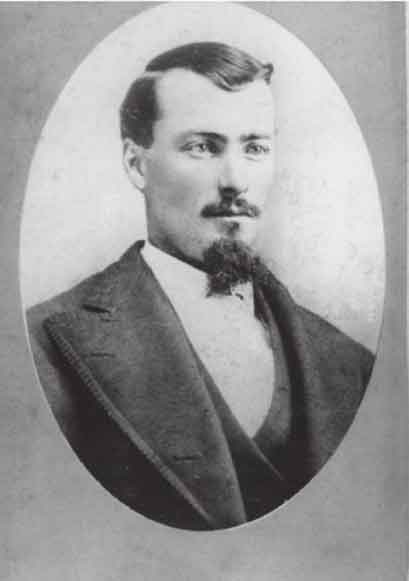
- Born: Robert Findley McLaury; March 3, 1849; Kortright, New York, U.S.
- Died: October 26, 1881 (aged 32); Tombstone, Arizona Territory, U.S.
- Cause of death: Gunshot wounds
- Occupations: Ranch hand, miner, outlaw, cattle rustler
- Allegiance: The Cowboys

Frank McLaury (born Robert Findley McLaury; March 3, 1849 – October 26, 1881) was an American outlaw. He and his brother Tom allegedly owned a ranch outside Tombstone, Arizona, although this ownership is disputed, that cowboy Frank Patterson owned the ranch. Arizona Territory during the 1880s, and had ongoing conflicts with lawmen Wyatt, Virgil, and Morgan Earp. Ike Clanton repeatedly threatened the Earps due to Ike’s drunkenness and paranoia of Wyatt Earp ratting Ike out to the other cowboys for taking a bribe of $6,000 for the whereabouts of Billy Leonard. On October 26, 1881, Tom, Frank, and Billy Clanton were killed in the Gunfight at the O.K. Corral.

== Early life ==
Frank (born Robert Findley McLaury and known as "Rob" when younger) was born in Kortright, New York. He was one of eleven children born to Margaret Rowland and Robert Houston McLaury, a descendant of Matthew McClaughry of Ireland and his son Thomas McClaughry of Kortright, New York. The McLaury family worked a farm in Merideth, Delaware County, New York. The father Robert moved the family to a new farm near Belle Plaine in Benton County, Iowa, in 1855, where Robert also practiced law.

His mother Margaret died when an epidemic of typhoid swept through their community on October 11, 1859, when Frank was 9. Franks' father Robert was 65 years old in August 1875. By that time he had lived as a widower for over 15 years. He was the father of 11 children, six of them sons. But by 1875, two of his sons had already died. His father remarried widow and neighbor Jane Arbuthnot on September 13, 1860. Eight of his siblings including Frank were still living at home, as were eight of Jane's children.

Frank's older brother Edwin McLaury joined the 14th Iowa Volunteers, which saw action at the battle of Fort Donelson and Pittsburgh Landing (Shiloh). Edwin was captured and imprisoned at Macon, Georgia, and after he was paroled he came home but died in October 1862 from the effects of starvation and disease. Another brother, Will, was still serving in the Union Army and could not attend Edwins' funeral.

After the war, the McLaury family moved 50 miles (80 km) north to Buchanan County, Iowa, to farm land in an unincorporated portion outside Hazelton Township known as Buffalo. Tom and Frank helped their father work the 800 acres (3,200,000 m^{2}) farm. By 1859, only Frank (known as "Rob" within the family because his name, like his father's, was Robert), Christiana (known as "Anna"), Tom and Sarah Caroline, the youngest of the clan, who they called Carrie, were living on their father's farm.

In 1872, the elder McLaury, aged 65, remarried 35-year-old widow Ann Lavina (Miller) Leigh; she was two years younger than Frank and had five children from her previous marriage ranging in age from 2 to 13 years old. Only Frank, Tom and Carrie remained at home. By 1875, the youngest daughter of Robert and Margaret, Anna, married and moved away, and by this time two of her brothers had died. Frank had 13 siblings and half-siblings.

Frank and his brother Tom left Iowa in 1878 for Fort Worth, Texas. Their older brother Will had completed college and moved with his family to Fort Worth where he opened a law practice. Around the time he was in Fort Worth, Robert Findley stopped using his given name and began going by Frank, a modern derivative of his middle name, Findley. Will later became a judge in Fort Worth, and both Frank and his younger brother Tom McLaury studied pre-law.

In 1878, Frank and Tom may have joined a cattle drive working for either John Slaughter or John Chisum and they moved to Hereford, Arizona, where they got a job working for Old Man Clanton. The Clanton family owned one of the largest cattle operations in Arizona. When Old Man Clanton sold his ranch to purchase another holding along the San Pedro River in southern Arizona, Ike Clanton remained behind. The McLaury brothers and Ike became fast friends.

== Move to Arizona ==
By 1879 the two brothers were experiencing some success in their cattle business, and they purchased land and built a house at Soldiers Hole along the Babocomari creek, a tributary of the San Pedro River. Another account says they never held title to the land, but that it was owned by Frank Patterson. Nearby Tombstone, Arizona, was just beginning to see its population explode due to the silver rush. Frank briefly assisted local constable Melvin Jones in apprehending soldiers who had stolen government horse harnesses. The soldiers attempted to bribe the two men but McLaury and Jones both insisted they submit to arrest.

Sometime after their arrival in the San Pedro River valley they met "Curly Bill" Brocius. On October 27, 1880, the two brothers were with Brocius when he accidentally shot and killed Tombstone Marshal Fred White. The two men were briefly detained. Before he died, White stated that the shooting was accidental and Brocius was released.

=== Livestock theft ===
The McLaury brothers were suspected of stealing cattle from Sonora, Mexico and re-selling them to Old Man Clanton and local butchers. On July 25, 1880, Captain Joseph H. Hurst requested the assistance of Deputy U.S. Marshal Virgil Earp, who brought Wyatt and Morgan Earp, as well as Wells Fargo agent Marshall Williams, to track the thieves of six U.S. Army mules stolen from Camp Rucker. This was a federal matter because the animals were U.S. property. Acting on a tip, they found the animals on the McLaury's Ranch on the Babacomari River and the branding iron used to change the "US" brand to "D8".

To avoid bloodshed, Cowboy Frank Patterson promised to return the mules and Hurst pressed the posse to withdraw. The Cowboys showed up two days later without the mules and laughed at Captain Hurst and the Earps. Hurst responded by printing and distributing a handbill describing the theft and promising a reward for the "trial and conviction" of the thieves. It said, "It is known that the stolen animals were secreted at or in the vicinity of the McLaury Brothers ranch, and it is also believed that they were branded on the left shoulder over the Government brand. " Hurst specifically charged Frank McLaury with assisting with hiding the mules. It was reprinted in The Tombstone Epitaph on July 30, 1880. Frank McLaury angrily printed a response in the Cowboy-friendly Nuggett, calling Hurst "unmanly, " "a coward, a vagabond, a rascal, and a malicious liar, " accusing Hurst of stealing the mules himself. Virgil reported that Frank accosted him and warned him "If you ever again follow us as close as you did, then you will have to fight anyway."

=== Tensions with the Earps ===
In November 1879, shortly after arriving in Tombstone, a prize horse of Wyatt Earp's was stolen. More than a year later, he learned the horse had been seen in Charleston and was in the possession of Ike Clanton and his brother Billy. Earp and Doc Holliday rode to the Clanton ranch near Charleston to recover the horse. On the way, they overtook Sheriff Johnny Behan, who was riding in a wagon. Behan was also heading to the ranch to serve an election-hearing subpoena on Ike Clanton. According to Wyatt's testimony later, 18-year-old Billy Clanton asked him insolently if he had any more horses to "lose", but he gave the horse up without first being shown the ownership papers, demonstrating to Wyatt that Billy knew to whom the horse belonged.

=== Move to Sulphur Springs ===
Early in 1881, shortly after Cochise County was created, Tom and Frank moved their ranching operations to the Sulphur Springs Valley. They dug a well and built a substantial adobe ranch house, a barn, corrals, and irrigation ditches for farming. They owned eight horses, two mules, and 140 cattle. They began planning a visit to their sister Sarah Caroline McLaury in Iowa, who was set to be married on November 30.

== Shootout at the O.K. Corral ==
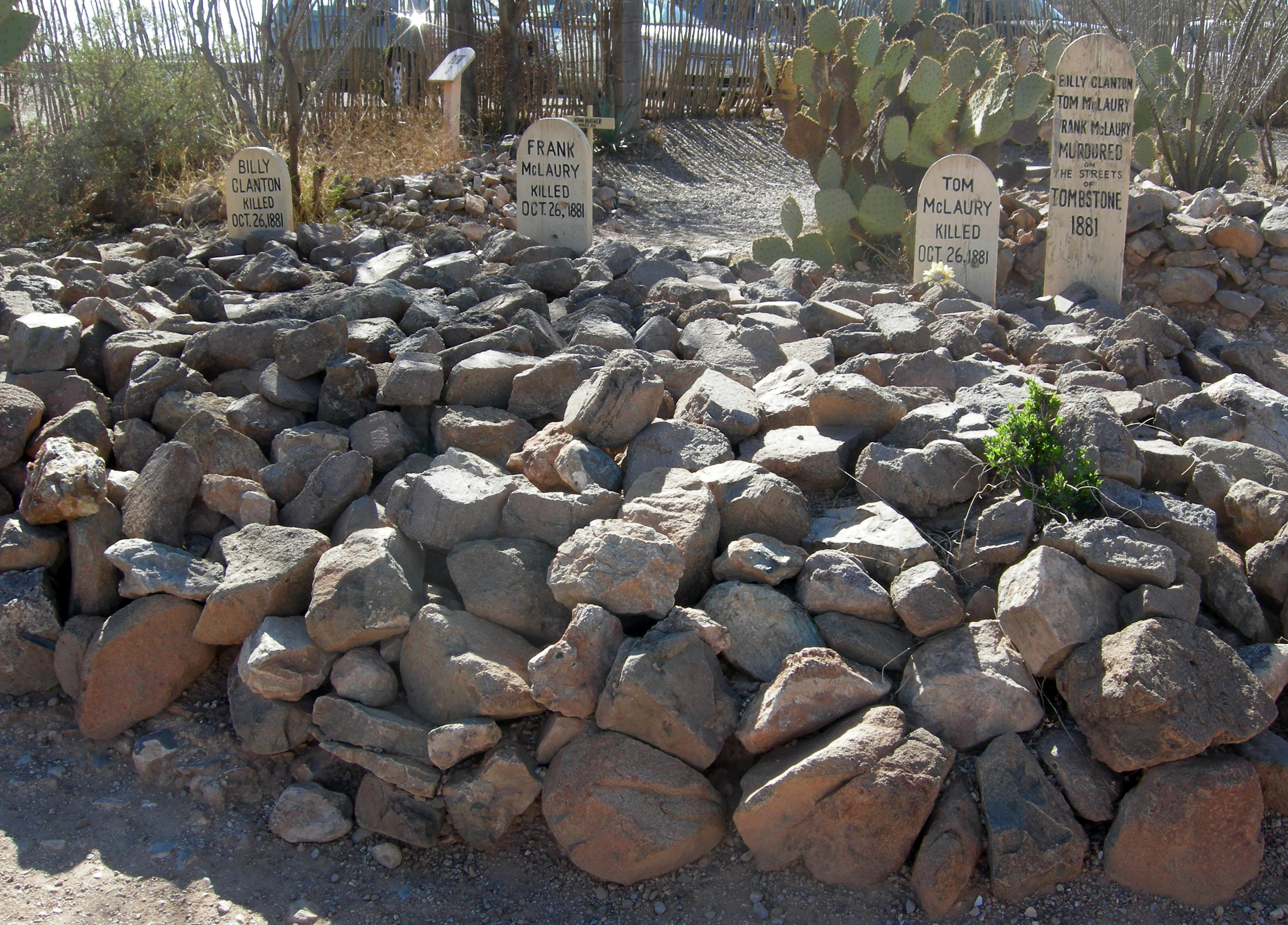
Graves of Billy Clanton, Frank McLaury and Tom McLaury in Boothill Cemetery, Tombstone, Arizona.

On October 26, 1881, the McLaury brothers were in Tombstone to conclude a cattle deal. Tensions between the Earps and Cowboys had escalated. Ike Clanton had been cited earlier in the day for carrying a weapon in town, after which Tom McLaury had arrived to get Ike. Wyatt Earp and McLaury had a heated exchange. and Wyatt later testified he saw a pistol in Tom's waistband and buffaloed Tom.

Later in the day the Clantons and McLaurys, along with Billy Claiborne, faced off against the Earps and Doc Holliday in the Gunfight at the O.K. Corral. Some witnesses testified that Frank and Billy Clanton drew their weapons first, while others loyal to the Cowboys supported their version of events in which Tom opened his coat to show he was unarmed. The Earps and Holliday killed Frank and Tom McLaury along with Billy Clanton. All three were buried in Tombstone's Boot Hill cemetery. Their brother William McLaury spent most of his finances in pursuing charges against the Earps and Doc Holliday. Tom left his pistol at a nearby saloon at some point that afternoon, but the Earps had no way of knowing that.

Tom McLaury had $3,000 in his possession when he died during the shootout, a fact that the prosecution emphasized during the preliminary hearing that followed the shoot out. His brother William, who joined the prosecution team, wrote in a letter home to Texas that his brothers had just sold their herd of cattle and were leaving Tombstone shortly to come be with him in Fort Worth. He said that they were in Tombstone on business, with plans to depart shortly afterward to visit him in Texas. They may have been arranging a cattle deal with their neighbor E. B Frink with butchers Bauer & Kehoe.

Although modern historians have called him a gunfighter, others say he was not. The Gunfight at the O.K. Corral is believed to have been his only violent confrontation.

== See also ==
- Ten Percent Ring
