= Morgan Earp =

American lawman and Earp family brother (1851–1882)

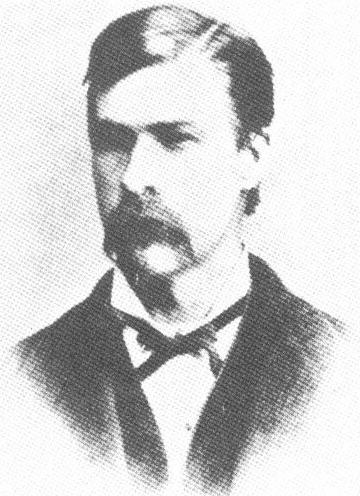
- Morgan Earp, about 1881, in Tombstone
- Born: Morgan Seth Earp; April 24, 1851; Pella, Iowa, U.S.
- Died: March 18, 1882 (aged 30); Tombstone, Arizona Territory, U.S.
- Cause of death: Gunshot wound
- Resting place: Hermosa Gardens Cemetery, Colton, California
- Occupations: Sheriff; shotgun messenger; deputy U.S. marshal
- Known for: Gunfight at the O.K. Corral
- Opponents: William Brocius; Frank McLaury; Frank Stillwell
- Spouse: Louisa A. Houston
- Parent(s): Nicholas Porter Earp and his second wife, Virginia Ann Cooksey
- Relatives: Siblings Newton, Mariah Ann, James, Virgil, Martha, Wyatt, Warren, Virginia Ann, and Douglas Earp

Morgan Seth Earp (April 24, 1851 – March 18, 1882) was an American sheriff and lawman. He served as Tombstone, Arizona's Special Policeman when he helped his brothers Virgil and Wyatt, as well as Doc Holliday, confront the outlaw Cochise County Cowboys in the gunfight at the O.K. Corral on October 26, 1881. All three Earp brothers had been the target of repeated death threats made by the Cowboys who were upset by the Earps' interference in their illegal activities. The lawmen killed Cowboys Tom and Frank McLaury and Billy Clanton. All four lawmen were charged with murder by Billy's older brother, Ike Clanton, who had run from the gunfight. During a month-long preliminary hearing, Judge Wells Spicer exonerated the men, concluding they had been performing their duty.

Friends of the slain outlaws retaliated, and on December 29, Cowboys ambushed Virgil, leaving him maimed. Two and a half months later, on March 18, 1882, they ambushed Morgan, shooting him at night through the window of a door while he was playing billiards and killed him. The Cowboys suspected in both shootings were let off on technicalities or lack of evidence. Wyatt Earp felt he could not rely on the criminal justice system and decided to take matters into his own hands. He concluded the only way to get justice for his murdered brother was to avenge his death. Wyatt assembled a posse that included their brother Warren Earp and set out on a vendetta to kill those they felt were responsible.

Morgan married Louisa Alice Houston sometime in the 1870s. They lived in Montana before joining his brothers in Tombstone. Louisa was staying with his parents in California when Morgan was murdered.

== Early life ==
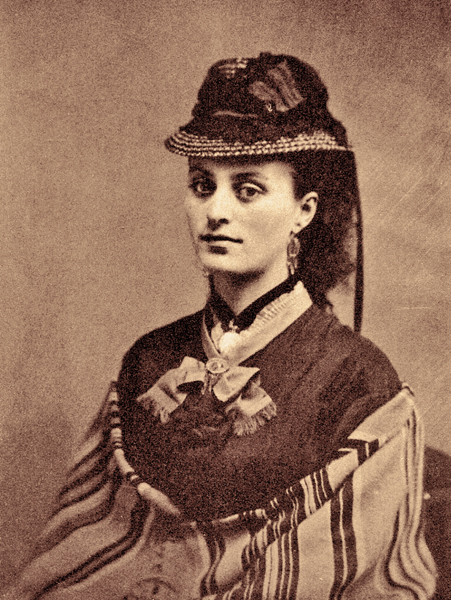
Morgan married Louisa Alice Houston in the 1870s. After Morgan's murder, she married Gustav Peters in 1885 and died in 1894 in Long Beach, California.

Morgan Earp was born in Pella, Iowa, to Nicholas Porter Earp (1813–1907), a cooper and farmer, and his second wife Virginia Ann Cooksey (1821–1893).

=== Brothers' service in the Civil War and later ===
When elder brothers Newton, James, and Virgil went off to the American Civil War, they left their young teenage brothers Wyatt and Morgan to tend the family farm. James and Morgan grew up close, with a shared wish for adventure and a dislike of farming. Before adulthood, teen-aged Morgan followed James Earp to Montana for a couple of years. Later he was with Wyatt on the Western frontier.

In spring 1868, his father Nicholas Porter Earp and his siblings Ginnie, Warren, and Adelia returned to the mid-west and Lamar, Missouri, where Nick became the local constable. By November 17, 1869, Nick resigned to become Justice of the Peace. Wyatt, who had followed them to Missouri, was appointed constable in place of his father.

In early 1870, Wyatt married Urilla Sutherland, but she died later that year shortly before she was due to have a baby. Shortly afterward, Wyatt, James, Virgil, and Morgan got into what witnesses described as a "20-minute street fight" with Urilla's brothers and other relatives over the alleged bootlegging activities of both families.

Sometime between 1871 and 1877, Morgan met Louisa Alice Houston, the daughter of H. Samuel Houston and Elizabeth Waughtal. Louisa (born January 24, 1855) was the second eldest of 12 children.

In 1875, Morgan left Wichita, Kansas and became a deputy marshal under Charlie Bassett at Dodge City.

=== Move to Butte, Montana ===
In late 1877, Morgan and Louisa moved to Miles City, Montana, where they bought a home. Shortly after Wyatt and Virgil headed for Tombstone, Arizona, Morgan and Louisa sold their home in Montana and headed west. Morgan apparently didn't think the wild mining town of Tombstone was suitable for Louisa, who was a petite woman and suffered from rheumatoid arthritis. He took her instead to stay with his parents in Colton, California, in March 1880. Morgan set out to meet his older brothers in Tombstone on July 20, 1880. Louisa followed him in early December.

In 1878, the July 25 Daily Pioneer reported that Morgan had joined prospectors pursuing gold in the Bear Paw mountains on the Blackfeet Indian Reservation in northern Montana Territory, "Mr. Morgan Earpt [sic] arrived last evening from the Tongue River, which he left about three weeks ago." General John Gibbon had brought troops to the Teton River to keep prospectors from being "slaughtered by Indians." Morgan remained in Montana for an unknown amount of time.

On December 16, 1879, he was selected as a policeman in Butte, Montana. A story has circulated that Morgan and Billy Brooks competed for the job of a policeman. During a confrontation over the job, they got in a gunfight. Some accounts say Earp killed Brooks, and that Earp was wounded. But other accounts report that Brooks later died at the hands of a lynch mob, but no contemporary documentation of the shootout has been found. Morgan served for only three months, until March 10, 1880.

=== Arrival in Tombstone, Arizona Territory ===
Morgan's wife, Lou, wrote a letter to her sister Agnes on March 5, 1880: "We arrived in San Bernardino on Wednesday evening, and Thursday we came by train to the Temescal Mountains Warm Springs.… I suppose I will have to live here now for some time, for there is no way to make enough money to get away." Morgan is listed in the June 1880 census for Temescal. In a July 19, 1880, letter, Lou wrote, "My husband starts for Arizona in the morning."

At different times in Arizona, both Wyatt and Morgan worked as shotgun messengers for Wells Fargo & Co., deputy sheriffs for Pima County, and as deputies under Tombstone's town Marshal, Virgil Earp, their older brother. During December 1881, Wyatt was appointed by U.S. Marshal Crawley Dake as deputy U.S. marshal after Virgil was wounded. Wyatt appointed his brother Morgan as a deputy.

== Gunfight at the OK Corral ==
On Wednesday, October 26, 1881, the tension between the Earps and the Cowboys came to a head. Ike Clanton, Billy Claiborne, and other Cowboys had been threatening to kill the Earps for several weeks. Tombstone town Marshal Virgil Earp learned that the Cowboys were armed in violation of a city ordinance and had gathered near the O.K. Corral. Morgan was a deputy to his brother Virgil and on October 26, 1881, responded with Virgil and Wyatt to reports that Cowboys were armed on the streets of Tombstone. Ike Clanton had repeatedly threatened the Earps and he was backed up by Cowboys Tom McLaury, Frank McLaury, and Billy Clanton. Virgil asked Wyatt and Morgan and Doc Holliday to assist him, as he intended to disarm them. At approximately 3:00 p.m. the Earps headed towards Fremont Street where the Cowboys had been reported to be gathering.

They confronted five Cowboys on Fremont Street in an alley between the Harwood House and Fly's Boarding House and Photography Studio, the two parties were initially only about 6 to 10 feet (1.8 to 3.0 m) apart. Ike Clanton and Billy Claiborne fled the gunfight. Tom and Frank McLaury, along with Billy Clanton, were killed. Morgan was clipped by a shot across his back that nicked both shoulder blades and a vertebra, although he was able to continue firing his weapon. Virgil was shot through the calf and Holliday was grazed by a bullet.

== Assassination ==
The Earp brothers moved into the Cosmopolitan Hotel for safety and hired several men to help protect the family. Two months after the gunfight at the O.K. Corral, in December 1881, Virgil Earp was seriously wounded in an assassination attempt that left him with a permanently crippled left arm. By February 1882, Morgan grew wary of the danger to the Earps in Tombstone and sent Louisa to live with his parents in Colton, California. Morgan remained in Tombstone to support his brothers.

=== Ambush and murder ===
At 10:50 p.m. on Saturday, March 18, 1882, after returning from a musical at Schieffelin Hall, Morgan was ambushed. He was playing a late round of billiards at the Campbell & Hatch Billiard Parlor against owner Bob Hatch. Dan Tipton, Sherman McMaster, and Wyatt watched, having received threats that same day.

The assailant shot Morgan through the upper half of a four-pane windowed door. The bottom two windows had been painted over. The door opened onto a dark alley that ran through the block between Allen and Fremont Streets. Morgan, about 10 feet (3.0 m) from the door, was struck by a bullet in the back which injured his spine then exited his front and entered the thigh of mining foreman George A. B. Berry. Another bullet lodged in the wall near the ceiling over Wyatt's head. Several men rushed into the alley but found the shooter had fled.

After Morgan was shot, his brothers tried to help him stand, but Morgan said "Don't, I can't stand it. This is the last game of pool I'll ever play." They moved him to the floor near the card room door. Dr. William Miller arrived first, followed by Drs. Matthews and George Goodfellow. They all examined Morgan. Goodfellow, who would earn recognition in the United States as the nation's leading expert at treating abdominal gunshot wounds, concluded that Morgan's wounds were fatal.

Goodfellow described Morgan's wounds:

He was in a state of collapse resulting from a gunshot, or pistol wound, entering the body just to the left of the spinal column in the region of the left kidney emerging on the right side of the body in the region of the gall bladder. It certainly injured the great vessels of the body causing hemorrhage which, undoubtedly, causes death. It also involved the spinal column. It passed through the left kidney and also through the loin.

In the book Wyatt Earp: Frontier Marshal, author Stuart Lake wrote that Wyatt said that Morgan, before dying, whispered to Wyatt, "I can't see a damned thing." Wyatt said that they had promised each other to report visions of the next world when at the point of death. They moved him to a lounge and Morgan's family—Wyatt, Virgil, and James, along with Allie and Bessie—gathered around him. Morgan's wife Louisa was in Colton with his parents, and Warren Earp was out of town. Morgan died less than an hour after he was shot.

=== Burial ===
After his death, Morgan was laid out in a blue suit belonging to Doc Holliday. The family held his funeral in the Cosmopolitan Hotel. Wyatt learned that Frank Stilwell and others were waiting for them in Tucson, and assembled several deputies who guarded Virgil, Maddie, Ally and James. The Earps took Morgan's body by wagon the next day to Benson, where they hired a wagon to get to the New Mexico and Arizona railroad station in Contention. From Contention, they caught a train to Tucson.

While waiting for the next train in Tucson, they saw Stilwell apparently lying in wait and killed him. From Tucson, James accompanied Virgil, Maddie, Ally and Morgan's body to Colton, California where Morgan's wife and parents were waiting. Morgan was first buried in the old city cemetery of Colton, near Mount Slover. When the cemetery was moved in 1892, Morgan's body was reburied in the Hermosa Cemetery in Colton.

== Aftermath ==
While Wyatt was out of town, Coroner Dr. D.M. Mathew held an inquest into Morgan's death. Pete Spence's wife, Marietta Duarte, was ready to talk to the Coroner's Jury. She had been abused by her husband and may have had motivation to implicate him. She implicated her husband and four other men in Morgan's murder.

She testified that the day before, her husband and Indian Charlie were on the front porch when they saw Morgan Earp walk by. She said Pete Spence told Indian Charlie; (Florentino Cruz) "That's him; that's him," and the Indian walked ahead of Earp to get a good look at him. The night of the shooting, her husband was away. Around midnight, Cruz and Frank Stilwell showed up, armed with pistols and carbines, and her husband arrived soon after with Freis (Frederick Bode) and a fifth unidentified man (later identified as Hank Swilling), all carrying rifles. They talked in low and excited tones. The next morning, her husband struck both her and her mother, and threatened to shoot Marietta if she told what she knew. Witnesses said they saw Frank Stilwell running from the scene.

The Coroner's jury concluded that Spence, Stilwell, Frederick Bode, and "Indian Charlie" were the prime suspects in Morgan Earp's death.

Morgan Earp ... came to his death in the city of Tombstone on the 18th day of March, 1882 ... by reason of a gunshot or pistol wound inflicted at the hands of Pete Spence, Frank Stilwell, a party by the name of Freis, and two Indian half-breeds, one whose name is Charlie, but the name of the other not ascertained.

When the prosecution called Marietta Duarte to testify at the preliminary hearing, the defense objected because her testimony was hearsay and because a spouse could not testify against her husband. The judge agreed and the charges were dismissed.

On May 27, 1882, a "strong Democrat" was quoted in a letter in the Yuma, Arizona newspaper The Arizona Sentinel describing the events following the "murder of the noted desperado Frank Stilwell." Readers may want to know "how these so-called Republican outlaws are regarded by decent, law-abiding people in Tombstone, regardless of politics." The writer was of the opinion that Cochise County Sheriff Behan wanted the warrant from Governor Fremont with the "object was to have them assassinated... Neither the Sheriff nor any of his deputies have ever turned a hand to find the murderers" of Morgan Earp. "There is no hope for any honest man to get justice here against these scoundrels as long as Behan is in office."

=== Wyatt seeks personal justice ===
Wyatt Earp finally concluded that he could not rely on the court system for justice and decided to take matters into his own hands. He concluded that the only way to deal with Virgil's shooters and Morgan's murderers was to find and kill the Cowboys he believed were responsible. He gathered a band of loyal men and deputized them. They rode out to find those responsible.

=== Cowboys in jail ===
Unknown to Wyatt, three of the Cowboys he sought were in Behan's jail. After the Coroner's Jury ended, Spence immediately turned himself in, protected in Behan's jail. On the day of the inquest, two of Behan's deputy sheriffs arrested two of the suspects for other reasons. Cochise County Deputy Sheriff William Bell brought Indian Charlie from Charleston and placed him under arrest in the Tombstone jail for shooting a man in Charleston. Separately, Cochise County Deputy Sheriff Frank Hereford arrested "John Doe" Freeze [sic]. They were all later released.

While accompanying his brother Virgil to the rail head in Tucson, Wyatt spotted Frank Stilwell lying in wait. He was a suspect in Morgan's assassination. Wyatt and others pursued Stilwell and killed him. Earp then assembled and deputized a federal posse. They set out to track down others they believed responsible for shooting Virgil and killing Morgan. During the Earp Vendetta Ride, the federal posse looked for Pete Spence but found he was already in jail. They killed Florentino "Indian Charlie" Cruz, who had been identified by Pete Spence's wife as taking part in ambushing Virgil. They also accidentally came upon Curly Bill Brocius at a spring and Wyatt killed him with a single shotgun blast. Wyatt shot Johnny Barnes in the same gunfight and he died soon after.

=== Remaining suspects ===
Wyatt and his brothers were unable to apprehend or kill the other suspects in Morgan's death.

- Hank Swilling was last known when he was questioned in August 1878 about robbing the U.S. Mail.
- Frederick Bode was last listed in the 1880 US Census in Charleston, Pima County.
- Johnny Ringo was found dead on July 14, 1882 with a gunshot through the temple. The coroner's jury ruled his death to be a suicide.
- Ike Clanton was wanted for cattle-rustling when he resisted arrest on June 1, 1887. He attempted to draw his rifle on Detective Jonas V. Brighton who shot Clanton through the heart.
- Phineas Clanton was convicted of grand larceny for cattle rustling in 1887 and served 17 months of a ten year jail sentence in the Yuma Territorial Prison. He died in 1906.
- Pete Spence was convicted of manslaughter in 1883 and served 18 months of a five year sentence in the Yuma Territorial Prison. He married his friend Phineas Clanton's widow in 1910 and died in 1914.

== In popular culture ==
- Ward Bond played Morgan in My Darling Clementine, alongside Henry Fonda as Wyatt, Victor Mature as Doc Holliday and Tim Holt as Virgil.
- Ray Boyle played Morgan in fifteen episodes between 1956 and 1961 of the ABC/Desilu Productions western television series, The Life and Legend of Wyatt Earp, with Hugh O'Brian as Wyatt Earp.
- DeForest Kelley portrayed Morgan in the 1957 film Gunfight at the O.K. Corral alongside Burt Lancaster as Wyatt Earp, and Kirk Douglas as Doc Holliday.
- Sam Melville was Morgan Earp and James Garner played Wyatt Earp in the 1967 film Hour of the Gun.
- Bill Paxton played Morgan in the 1993 movie Tombstone with Kurt Russell as Wyatt, Sam Elliott as Virgil, and Val Kilmer as Doc Holliday.
- Linden Ashby played Morgan in the 1994 movie Wyatt Earp, with Kevin Costner as Wyatt, Michael Madsen as Virgil, and Dennis Quaid as Doc Holliday.
- Austin Nichols played Morgan in the Deadwood Tv series (Season 3)
- Rex Holman played as Morgan in Star Trek: The Original Series in the episode "Spectre of the Gun".
