= Tom McLaury =

American outlaw (1853–1881)

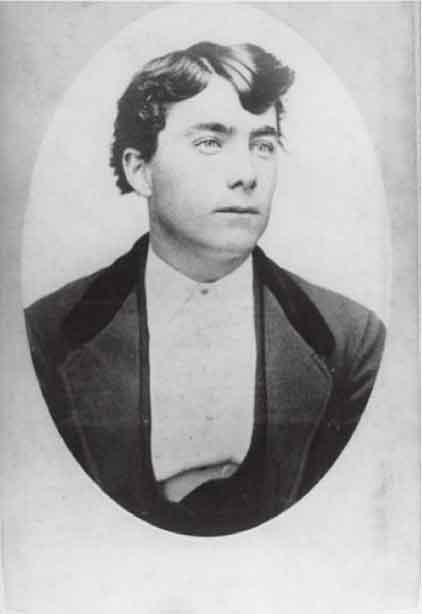
- McLaury in 1879
- Born: Thomas McLaury; June 30, 1853; Meredith, New York, U.S.
- Died: October 26, 1881 (aged 28); Tombstone, Arizona Territory, U.S.
- Cause of death: Gunshot
- Occupations: Ranch hand, miner, outlaw cattle rustler
- Allegiance: The Cowboys

Tom McLaury (born Thomas McLaury; June 30, 1853 – October 26, 1881) was an American outlaw. He and his brother Frank owned a ranch outside Tombstone, Arizona, Arizona Territory during the 1880s. He was a member of a gang of outlaws and cattle rustlers called the Cowboys that had ongoing conflicts with lawmen Wyatt, Virgil, and Morgan Earp. The McLaury brothers repeatedly threatened the Earps because they interfered with the Cowboys' illegal activities. On October 26, 1881, Tom and Frank were both killed in the Gunfight at the O.K. Corral in Tombstone, Arizona Territory. The Tombstone shootout was his only gunfight.

== Early life ==
Thomas McLaury was born in Meredith, New York. He was one of eleven children born to Margaret Rowland and Robert Houston McLaury, a descendant of Matthew McClaughry of Ireland and his son Thomas McClaughry of Kortright, New York. The McLaury family worked a farm in Merideth, Delaware County, New York. Tom was two years old when his family moved to Belle Plaine, Iowa.

Both Tom and his older brother Frank studied pre-law, and their oldest brother William McLaury eventually became a judge in Fort Worth, Texas. Tom was 5' 3" tall and his brother Frank was 5' 4" tall.

== Move to Arizona ==
In 1878 he and Frank moved to Hereford, Arizona, where they first met Ike Clanton and became associated with the Clanton family. At the time, the Clanton family owned one of the largest cattle operations in the Arizona Territory, although their success was based at least in part on stealing cattle from Mexico Rancheros and later U.S. ranches.

By 1879 the two brothers cattle business was growing and they purchased land and built a house at Soldiers Holes. Their ranching operation was near the silver-mining boomtown of Tombstone, Arizona Territory, as its population soared due to the silver rush. They became associated with "Curly Bill" Brocius. On October 27, 1880, the two brothers were briefly detained when Brocius accidentally shot and killed Tombstone Town Marshal Fred White.

== Outlaw activity ==
Tom McLaury was involved in several outlaw activities that brought him into conflict with the Earps.

=== Steals U.S. mules ===
On July 25, 1880, U.S. Army Captain Joseph H. Hurst asked Deputy U.S. Marshal Virgil Earp to assist him in tracking Cowboys who had stolen six U.S. Army mules from Camp Rucker. Virgil requested the assistance of his brothers Wyatt and Morgan, along with Wells Fargo agent Marshall Williams, and they found the mules at the McLaurys' ranch. McLaury was a Cowboy, which in that time and region was generally regarded as an outlaw. Legitimate cowmen were referred to as cattle herders or ranchers. They found the branding iron used to change the "U.S." brand to "D.8." Stealing the mules was a federal offense because the animals were U.S. property.

Cowboy Frank Patterson "made some kind of a compromise" with Captain Hurst and persuaded the posse to withdraw with the understanding that the mules would be returned. The Cowboys showed up two days later without the mules and laughed at Captain Hurst and the Earps. In response, Capt. Hurst printed a handbill describing the theft, and specifically charged McLaury with assisting in hiding the mules. He also reproduced the flyer in The Tombstone Epitaph, on July 30, 1880. McLaury angrily printed a response in the Cowboy-friendly Nuggett, calling Hurst "unmanly," "a coward, a vagabond, a rascal, and a malicious liar," and accused Hurst of stealing the mules himself. Capt. Hurst later cautioned Wyatt, Virgil, and Morgan that the cowboys had threatened their lives. Virgil reported that Frank accosted him and warned him "If you ever again follow us as close as you did, then you will have to fight anyway." A month later Earp ran into Frank and Tom McLaury in Charleston, and they told him if he ever followed them as he had done before, they would kill him.

=== Stage robberies ===
Tensions between the Earps and both the Clantons and McLaurys increased through 1881. On March 15, 1881 at 10:00 pm, three Cowboys attempted to rob a Kinnear & Company stagecoach carrying US$26,000 in silver bullion (about $867,414 in today's dollars) near Benson, during which popular driver Eli "Budd" Philpot and passenger Peter Roerig were killed.

Tensions further increased between the Earps and the McLaurys when a passenger stage on the Sandy Bob line headed for Bisbee was robbed in the Tombstone area on September 8. The masked robbers shook down the passengers and robbed the strongbox. They were recognized by their voices and language. They were identified as Pete Spence (an alias for Elliot Larkin Ferguson) and Frank Stilwell, a business partner of Spence who had shortly before been fired as a deputy of Sheriff Behan's (for county tax "accounting irregularities"). Spence and Stilwell, friends of the McLaury brothers, were arrested by sheriff's deputies Breakenridge and Nagel for the stage robbery, and later by Deputy U.S. Marshal Virgil Earp on the federal offense of mail robbery.

Released on bail, Spence and Stilwell were re-arrested by Virgil for the Bisbee robbery a month later, October 13, on the new federal charge of interfering with a mail carrier. The newspapers, however, reported that they had been arrested for a different stage robbery that occurred (October 8) near Contention City. Occurring less than two weeks before the O.K. Corral shootout, this final incident may have been misunderstood by the McLaurys. While Wyatt and Virgil were still out of town for the Spence and Stilwell hearing, Frank McLaury confronted Morgan Earp, telling him that the McLaurys would kill the Earps if they tried to arrest Spence, Stilwell, or the McLaurys again.

== Shootout in Tombstone ==
By October 1881, tensions between the Earps and Cowboys had increased dramatically. Ike Clanton, a good friend of Tom's, had repeatedly threatened the Earps. On October 26 he had been drinking most of the previous night and that morning. He was armed and told others he was looking for Holliday or an Earp. At about 1:00 pm, Virgil and Morgan Earp surprised Ike on 4th Street and Virgil buffaloed (pistol-whipped) him from behind. Disarming him, Virgil took Ike to appear before Judge Wallace for violating the city's ordinance against carrying firearms in the city. While Wyatt waited with Clanton, Virgil went to find Judge Wallace so the court hearing could be held.

On the morning of October 26, 1881, the McLaury brothers were in Tombstone and armed in violation of a city ordinance prohibiting carrying weapons in town.

It is not known who started shooting first. Accounts by both participants and eye-witnesses were contradictory. Those loyal to one side or the other told conflicting stories and independent eyewitnesses who did not know the participants by sight were unable to say for certain who shot first.

Most witnesses reported the first two shots were so close together that they could barely be distinguished. Some witnesses testified that Morgan and Doc fired across one another at Billy and Frank, respectively. Wyatt later testified that he and Billy Clanton fired the first two shots. Virgil said one of the first shots was Billy Clanton's. All witnesses agreed that general firing almost immediately commenced. Witnesses could not agree on whether Tom McLaury was armed.

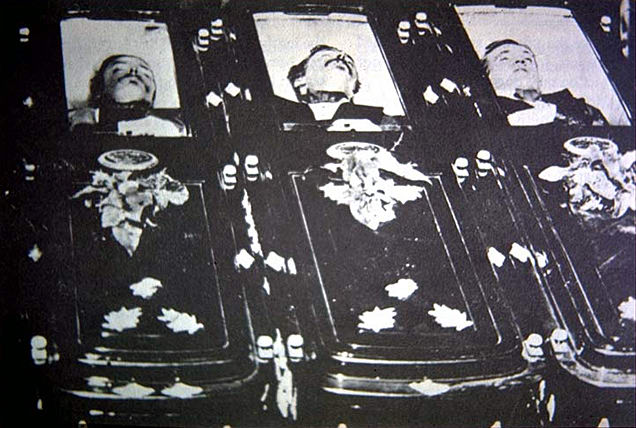
Tom McLaury; Frank McLaury and Billy Clanton

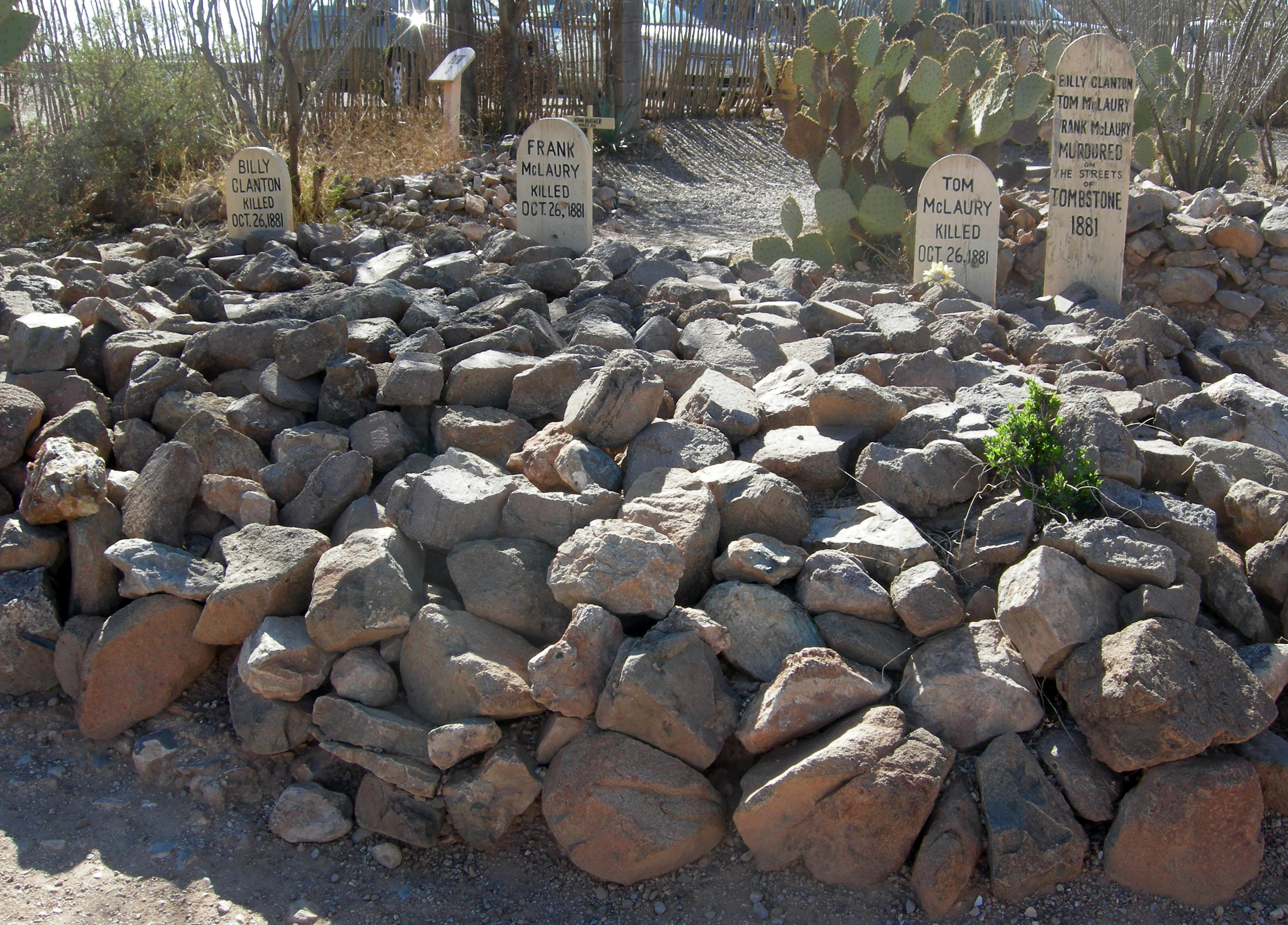
Graves of Billy Clanton, Frank McLaury and Tom McLaury in Boothill Cemetery, Tombstone, Arizona.

=== Role in the gunfight ===
On October 30, 1881, Ike Clanton filed murder charges against the Earps and Doc Holliday. Justice of the Peace Wells Spicer convened a preliminary hearing to determine if the charges had merit.

Various witnesses offered conflicting testimony about whether Tom was armed. When the gunfight ended, a gun was not found near Tom McLaury or on his body. Wyatt Earp later insisted that someone had removed Tom's weapon and that the Cowboys lied during the O.K. Corral hearing. At the time, The Tombstone Epitaph was loyal to the business owners and the Earps, while the Tombstone Nugget favored rural interests and the Cowboys. Wyatt testified afterward that he saw Billy Clanton and Frank McLaury in Spangenberger's gun and hardware store on 4th Street filling their gun belts with cartridges.

Clara Spalding Brown, the wife of mining engineer Theodore Brown, was a correspondent for the San Diego Union and other California newspapers. She wrote that Tombstone residents were divided about the justification for the killings. Based on the initial testimony given by Ike Clanton during the preliminary hearing, she reported to the San Diego Union that only two of the Cowboys were armed. Saloon owner Andrew Mehan testified that an hour before the gunfight Tom McLaury had checked his pistol with him at Mehan’s Saloon.

Wyatt Earp testified that Tom McLaury fired one or two rounds at them from behind a horse, and that if he was unarmed he did not know it. In an 1896 interview with the San Francisco Examiner, Earp further claimed that Tom McLaury had shot Morgan Earp from behind the horse. In two of Wyatt Earp's three biographies he indicated that Tom McLaury fired the first shots. However, some historians have suggested that Wyatt Earp's claims about his deeds were often flawed and could not be corroborated.

One eyewitness, Mrs. J.C. Colyer, was only a short distance away sitting in a buggy when the shootout took place. Although never called to testify at the subsequent inquest, her account of the shooting was published in the Epitaph a few weeks after the event. In her recount of the events she witnessed she said that it was in fact the Cowboys who fired first, and in that interview she said that one Cowboy used a horse as a barricade, firing from under the horses neck. It has since been confirmed that neither Billy Clanton nor Frank McLaury ever came near a horse during the shootout, so if her statement is to be believed, it could only have been Tom McLaury to which she was referring. She knew none of those involved, and was only in Tombstone to visit her sister, therefore making her an unbiased witness.

Another eyewitness, laundryman Peter H. Fellehy, testified that he saw Morgan Earp and Doc Holliday shooting at a man who was using a horse to barricade himself, and once shot the man fell. Fellehy said after the man fell he still held his pistol in his hand.

Though saloon-keeper Andrew Mehan had seen Tom deposit his pistol after his beating by Earp and before the gunfight, none of the Earps had any way of knowing that Tom had left his revolver at the saloon. Hotel keeper Albert "Chris" Billickie, whose father Charles owned the Cosmopolitan Hotel, saw Tom McLaury enter Bauer's butcher shop about 2:00 p.m. He testified that Tom's right-hand pants pocket was flat when he went in but protruded, as if it contained a pistol (so he thought), when he emerged. Retired army surgeon Dr. J. W. Gardiner also testified that he saw the bulge in Tom's pants. However, the bulge in Tom's pants pocket may have been the nearly $3,300 in cash and receipts found on his body, perhaps in payment for stolen Mexican beef purchased by the butcher.

Frank McLaury had told others that he had decided to remain in town to take care of some business. His brother Will McLaury, a judge in Fort Worth, Texas, claimed in a letter he wrote during the preliminary hearing after the shoot out that Tom and Frank were planning to conduct business before leaving town to visit him in Fort Worth. He wrote that Billy Clanton, who had arrived on horseback with Frank, intended to go with the McLaurys to Fort Worth. Author Paul Johnson believes that the McLaurys were about to leave for Iowa to attend the wedding of their sister, Sarah Caroline. Tom and Frank were especially close to Sarah, one of their 14 siblings and half-siblings.
