= William Brocius =

American gunman, rustler, and outlaw (1845–1882)

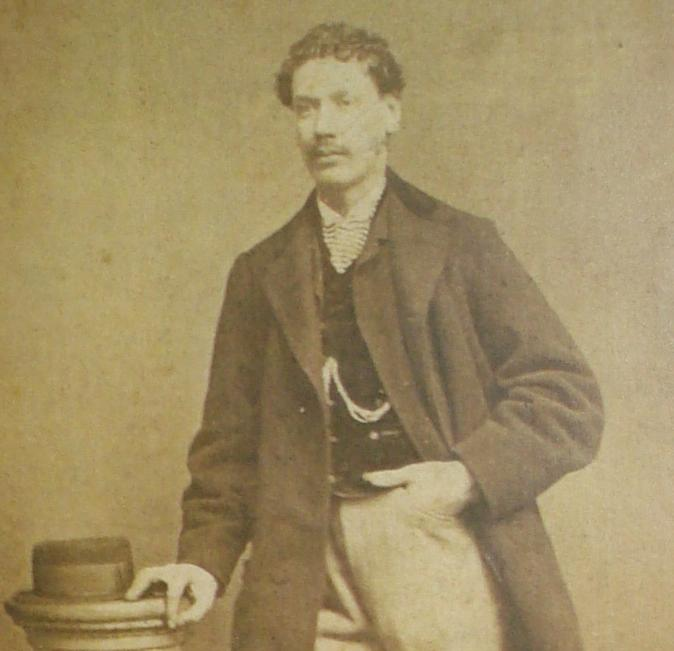
- An unauthenticated photo of Curly Bill Brocius from the Bird Cage Theater in Tombstone.
- Born: c. 1845; Crawfordsville, Indiana, U.S. (speculated)
- Died: March 24, 1882 (aged 36–37); Iron Springs, Arizona Territory, U.S.
- Cause of death: Gunshot wound to the stomach
- Occupations: Cowboy, outlaw, rustler
- Years active: 1860–1882
- Opponents: Earp family; Doc Holliday; Lawmen
- Allegiance: The Cowboys

William "Curly Bill" Brocius (circa 1845 – March 24, 1882), was an American gunslinger, cattle rustler and member of the Cowboy outlaw gang in the Cochise County area of what was then Arizona Territory during the late 1870s and early 1880s. Brocius' name is likely an alias or nickname, and some evidence links him to another outlaw named William "Curly Bill" Bresnaham, who was convicted of an 1878 attempted robbery and murder in El Paso, Texas.

Brocius had a number of conflicts with the lawmen of the Earp family, and was named as one of the men who participated in Morgan Earp's assassination. Deputy U.S. Marshal Wyatt Earp and a group of deputies, including his brother Warren, pursued those they believed responsible for Morgan's death. The Earp posse unexpectedly encountered Curly Bill and other Cowboys on March 24, 1882, at Iron Springs (present-day Mescal Springs). Wyatt killed Curly Bill during the shootout. In his journal written in October 1881, George Parsons referred to Brocius as "Arizona's most famous outlaw."

== Life in Arizona ==
William Brocius emigrated to Arizona Territory from either Texas or Missouri about 1878, traveling briefly to the San Carlos Reservation with a herd of cattle before arriving in the territory. Brocius was an Outlaw Cowboy and a cattle rustler, and was for a time also a tax collector for Cochise County Sheriff Johnny Behan, making other rustlers pay taxes on their stolen cattle (the money went into the sheriff's coffers and added to his salary).

Brocius was known for a mean sense of humor when drunk. He was reported to have perpetrated such "practical jokes" as using gunfire to make a preacher "dance" during a sermon, and making Mexicans at a community dance take off their clothes and dance naked. Both incidents were reported by Wells Fargo agent Fred Dodge in his memoirs and alluded to in the newspapers of the time.

== Description ==
An unauthenticated photo of Brocius is displayed in the Bird Cage Theatre Museum in Tombstone. Two other unauthenticated photos of Brocius have been provided by descendants. Several writers who knew Brocius reported that he was well-built with curly black hair and a freckled complexion.

== Shooting of Fred White, 1880 ==
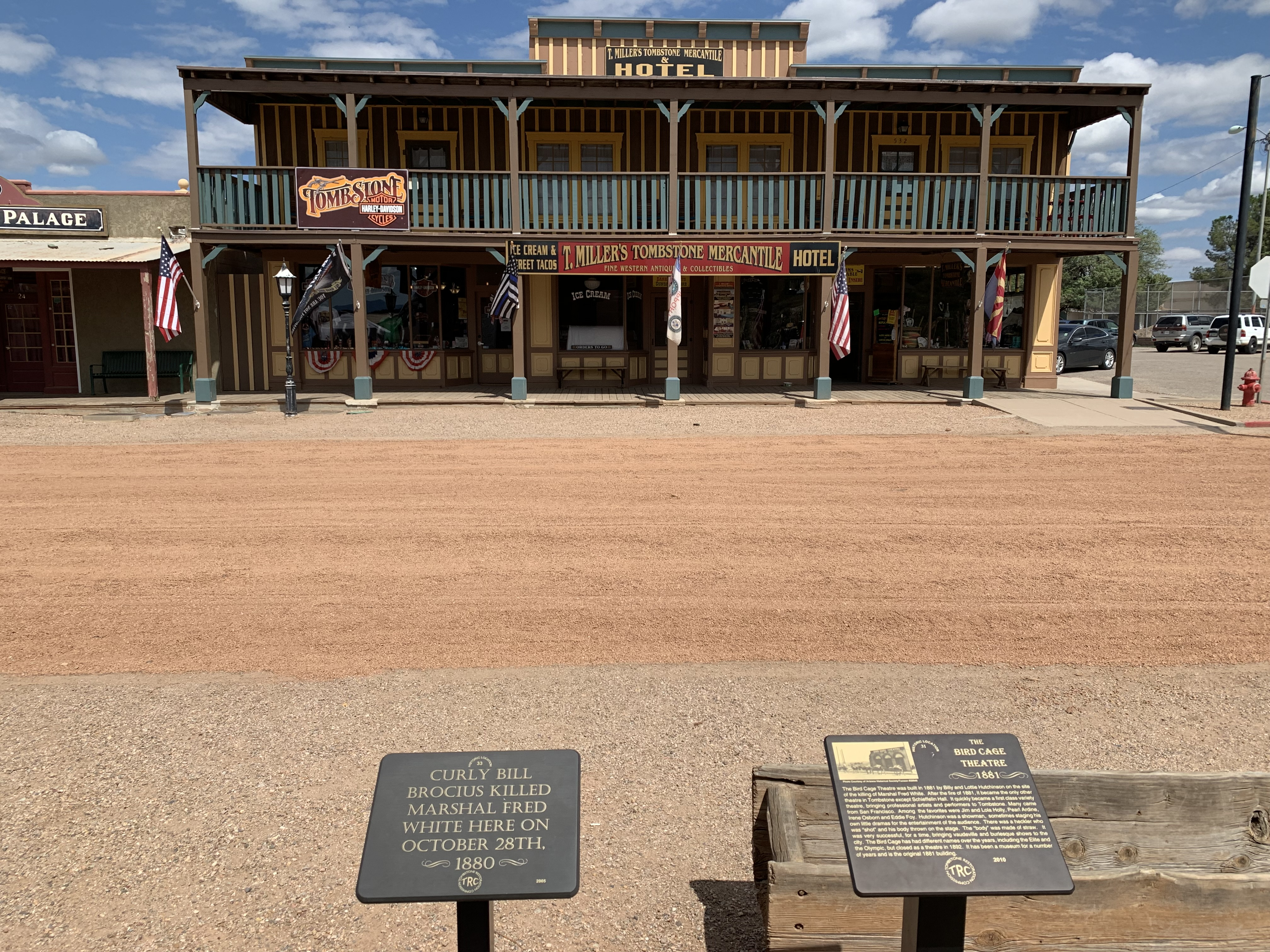
Present day site where Brocius shot Marshal Fred White

In a drunken revelry, some of Curly Bill's friends were firing pistols into the air on October 28, 1880, in a dark vacant lot between Toughnut and Allen Streets, near where the Birdcage Theater now stands. Tombstone's Town Marshal Fred White attempted to disarm Brocius and grabbed his weapon by the barrel. The gun discharged, striking White in the groin. Wyatt Earp had borrowed Fred Dodge's pistol and he pistol-whipped Brocius. At the preliminary hearing for Brocius afterward, Wyatt testified that he had heard White say: "I am an officer; give me your pistol." When he got close, he saw Brocius remove his pistol from his holster and White grab it by the barrel. He said he put his arms around Brocius from behind to see if he had any other weapons, and White "gave a quick jerk and the pistol went off." White fell to the ground, wounded. When the pistol discharged, Wyatt buffaloed Brocius and arrested him. Brocius complained, "What have I done? I have not done anything to be arrested for."

=== Brocius fearful of lynching ===
White was carried to a doctor and they initially thought he would recover, and the next day, he gave a statement that exonerated Curly Bill of murder, but that night, White's condition worsened. Brocius later claimed that his gun discharged accidentally and reportedly immediately regretted shooting White. He testified at his trial that he did not consider himself to have committed a crime. Brocius waived his right to a preliminary hearing, apparently because he feared a lynching, as White was very popular as town marshal. Brocius was anxious to be moved out of town. Pima County Deputy Sheriff Earp and George Collins immediately took Brocius to Tucson for trial.

=== Brocius exonerated of White's death ===
White died two days after Curly Bill shot him. Before dying, White testified that he thought the pistol had accidentally discharged and that he did not believe that Curly Bill shot him on purpose. Wyatt Earp supported this testimony, (ironically, given his later vendetta against Brocius and the rest of the Cowboy gang) as did a demonstration that Brocius's pistol could be fired from half-cock, and the fact that it had been found to contain six rounds, with only one of them fired. After spending most of November and December 1880 in jail awaiting trial, Brocius was acquitted with a verdict of accidental death.

Wyatt told his biographer, John H. Flood, Jr., many years later that he thought that Brocius was still armed at the time and did not notice that Brocius' pistol lay on the ground in the dark, until Brocius was already down. Despite being responsible for the deaths of several other men during his life, Brocius had apparently personally liked White and maintained that his death had been an accident.

== Outlaw Cowboy ==
Brocius was described by contemporary author Billy Breakenridge in his book, Helldorado: Bringing the Law to the Mesquite, as being the most deadly pistol shot of the Cowboys: "able to hit running jackrabbits, shoot out candle flames without breaking the candles or lantern holders, and shoot quarters from between the fingers of volunteers". When drunk, Brocius was also known for a mean sense of humor and for such "practical jokes" as using gunfire to make a preacher "dance" during a sermon or forcing Mexicans at a community dance to take off their clothes and dance naked. Wells Fargo agent Fred Dodge reported both incidents in his memoirs, and both were alluded to in local newspapers.

=== Shooting of Dick Lloyd ===
On March 8, 1881, Brocius and his friend Johnny Ringo rode to Maxey, near Camp Thomas, Arizona. Cowboy Dick Lloyd got drunk while playing poker in O'Neil and Franklin's saloon. After shooting and wounding one man, Lloyd rode his horse into the saloon where Brocius was drinking. Brocius and several other men resented the interruption, and about a dozen of them, including Brocius, shot and killed Lloyd. Owner O'Neil took the blame and was acquitted.

=== Shot in face ===
On May 25, 1881, Brocius was drinking heavily in Galeyville with his friend of several months and Lincoln County War veteran Jim Wallace and eight or nine other cowboys. Wallace insulted Brocius' friend and ally, Tombstone Deputy Marshal Billy Breakenridge. Breakenridge ignored him, but Brocius took offense and insisted that Wallace accompany him and apologize to Breakenridge. Brocius threatened to kill him. Wallace complied, but Brocius afterward heaped abuse on Wallace, announcing, "You damned Lincoln County son of a bitch, I'll kill you anyhow." Wallace left the saloon and Curly Bill followed him. Feeling threatened, Wallace shot Curly Bill, wounding him in the cheek and neck.

Deputy Breakenridge arrested Wallace, but the court ruled he acted in self-defense.

=== Shooting of the Haslett brothers ===
In July 1881, Bill Leonard and Harry Head attempted to rob William and Isaac Haslett's general store in Hachita, New Mexico. The Haslett brothers killed Leonard and Head during the hold-up. Some modern researchers state that Brocius and friend Johnny Ringo rode to New Mexico to avenge their friends' deaths and killed both Haslett brothers. However, no witnesses to this crime were found, nor to Curly Bill's involvement in the Hasletts' death.

Four months after Brocius was shot, on October 6, 1881, George Parsons rode through the McLaury brothers' ranch in Sulphur Springs Valley as part of an Indian scouting party, and noted that Brocius had not yet fully recovered from his wound, but was well enough to ride. For this reason, many historians doubt that Brocius took part in killing William and Isaac Haslett.

=== Participation in Skeleton Canyon Massacre ===
In July, some reports say that Brocius ambushed a Mexican trail herd in the Skeleton Canyon Massacre. Six vaqueros were killed and the remainder captured, then possibly tortured and murdered. Curly Bill reportedly sold the stolen Mexican cattle to Newman Haynes Clanton the next month. When Old Man Clanton was herding the cattle on the trail to Tombstone, four others and he were ambushed in the Guadalupe Canyon Massacre and murdered by Mexicans. No reports were verified of Curly Bill's involvement in these episodes, nor was he charged with any crimes related to these events.

Brocius was still recovering from being shot in the face by Wallace only six weeks earlier. Some modern researchers doubt that he was well enough to take part in these events.

=== Assassination of Morgan Earp ===
Following the Gunfight at the O.K. Corral on October 26, 1881, Brocius robbed the Tombstone–Bisbee stagecoach on January 6, 1882, and the Tombstone-Benson stage the next day. Deputy U.S. Marshal Wyatt Earp gathered a posse and rode after the men, but was unable to find them in the Chiricahua Mountains. Brocius returned to Tombstone on March 17. He was named by Pete Spence's wife Marietta Duarte as a participant in the assassination of Morgan Earp. Justice of the Peace Wells Spicer disallowed her testimony because it was hearsay and because she could not testify against her husband. Lacking evidence, the prosecution dropped all charges against the Cowboys. Wyatt Earp killed outlaw Cowboy Frank Stilwell in Tucson on March 20, 1882, while guarding his brother Virgil en route to California.

== Death at Iron Springs ==
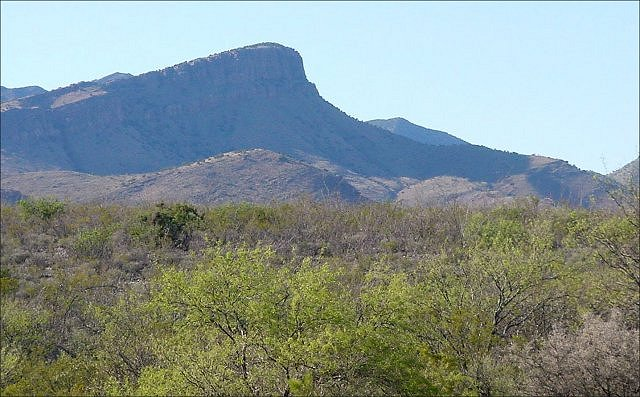
The Whetstone Mountains

On March 24, 1882, the Earp party was expecting to meet Charlie Smith at Iron Springs (later Mescal Springs), in the Whetstone Mountains. Smith was bringing cash from Tombstone about 20 miles (32 km) to the east to help pay posse expenses. As they surmounted the edge of a wash near the springs, they stumbled upon Brocius, Pony Diehl, Johnny Barnes, Frank Patterson, Milt Hicks, Bill Hicks, Bill Johnson, Ed Lyle, and Johnny Lyle, cooking a meal alongside the spring.

=== Shootout with Wyatt Earp ===
According to Wyatt Earp — and an anonymous report to The Tombstone Epitaph— he was in the lead of the posse when they suddenly came upon the Cowboys' camp at the springs from less than 30 feet (9 m) behind an embankment. The Cowboys began firing just as Earp dismounted and thought for a moment they had shot him, but they had hit his saddle horn, instead. Texas Jack Vermillion, whose horse was killed, remained cool under fire and stuck close to Wyatt during the fight. Doc, Johnson, and McMaster fired their weapons and sought cover. Warren Earp was away on an errand at the time.

Eighteen months prior, Wyatt Earp had protected Brocius against a mob ready to lynch him for killing Town Marshal Fred White, and then provided testimony that helped spare him from a murder conviction. Now, Brocius fired at Earp with his shotgun from about 50 feet (15 m), but missed. Earp returned fire over his horse using a 22-inch, 10-gauge shotgun. He killed Brocius with a load of buckshot to the stomach, nearly cutting him in half. Brocius fell into the water at the edge of the spring.

The Cowboys fired a number of shots at the Earp party, but the lawmen's fire was so intense that those Cowboys who could, left. Earp's long coat was punctured by bullets on both sides. Another bullet struck his boot heel and his saddle horn was hit, as well, burning the saddle hide and narrowly missing Wyatt. Firing his pistol, Earp shot Johnny Barnes in the chest and Milt Hicks in the arm. Vermillion tried to retrieve his rifle wedged in the scabbard under his fallen horse, exposing himself to the Cowboys' gunfire. Doc Holliday helped him gain cover. Earp had trouble remounting his horse due to a cartridge belt that had slipped down his legs. He was finally able to get on his horse and retreat. McMaster was grazed by a bullet that cut through the straps of his field glasses.

Earp biographer John Flood wrote that the Cowboys buried Brocius' body on the nearby ranch of Frank Patterson near the Babocomari River. This is close to the original McLaury ranch site about 5 miles (8 km) west of Fairbank (before the McLaurys moved to the Sulphur Springs Valley in late 1880). Brocius's grave site has never been identified.

=== Proof of death ===
Fred J. Dodge, an undercover operative for Wells Fargo in Tombstone, asked Curly Bill's associates about his death. He wrote that he talked to "J. B. Ayers, a saloonkeeper of Charleston where the outlaws and rustlers headquartered, told me that the men who were in the fight told him that Wyatt Earp killed Curly Bill and that they took the body away that night and that they buried him on Patterson's ranch on the Babocomari." The Tombstone Nugget first put up a $1,000 reward for proof Curly Bill died, and The Tombstone Epitaph countered with a $2,000 reward. Neither was ever collected. Brocius was not wanted by the law in Arizona. If he were not dead, he had no reason to disappear. He also was unlikely to return to Texas where, according to Wyatt Earp's recollection, he was probably still wanted for murder.

== Other names ==
Because of his nickname, "Curly Bill" Brocius has been confused with "Curly Bill" Graham, a different outlaw of the same geographical region and time period. Graham was killed in a gunfight by Deputy Sheriff James D. Houck on October 17, 1887, and buried in Young, Arizona, and is not considered by historians to be the same Curly Bill of Charleston and Tombstone. Brocius' birth date, birth name, and birthplace are not known.

In newspapers of the time, Brocius was known alternately as "Curly Bill" and "Curley Bill". His surname has also been spelled as "Brocious", although the former is the spelling used for his maildrop in Arizona Territory, according to one published letter of the time.

=== Origins in Missouri ===
Historical research into Brocius' death turned up two possible earlier identities. Denis McLoughlin in The Encyclopedia of the Old West reports that Brocius was from Missouri and named William B. Graham. He said Brocius rode for various Texas cattle outfits and was known in Kansas.

=== Origins in Texas ===
While on the way to Tucson, Brocius asked Wyatt Earp to recommend an attorney. As reported in The Tombstone Epitaph:

The facts leaked out in this way: On the road to Tucson, Brocius asked Earp where he could get a good lawyer. Earp suggested that Hereford and Zabriskie were considered a good firm. Broscius said that he didn't want Zabriskie, as he had prosecuted him once in Texas.

Wyatt looked into the story about Brocius' time in Texas and learned that Brocius had been convicted of robbery in El Paso, Texas, during which a man had been killed. Zabriskie had prosecuted Brocius for the crime, and "he was tried and sentenced to the penitentiary, but managed to make his escape shortly after being incarcerated."

The El Paso Daily Times speculated that he was the man whom Texas Ranger Thomas Mode shot in the right ear.

Modern researchers have linked Brocius with a man known as William "Curly Bill" Bresnaham, who was convicted in a robbery attempt in Texas in 1878, along with another known cowboy of the Tombstone area named Robert Martin. The men were convicted and sentenced to five years in prison, but both escaped, presumably to the southwest Arizona Territory. Since both Robert Martin and Curly Bill became known as leaders of the rustlers in Arizona Territory, they are likely the same Robert Martin and Curly Bill of the Texas crime.

According to historian Robert M. Utley, Robert Martin was a member of the Jesse Evans gang of outlaws in New Mexico during the mid- to late 1870s. Billy the Kid briefly joined this group before going to work for John Tunstall. Evans's gang, a loose-knit consortium of desperadoes known as "The Boys", ended up fighting against the "Regulators" during the Lincoln County War. Because of the time frame, the location, and his friendship with Martin, Curly Bill Brocius may have been a member of the Evans gang, as well.

== Portrayals in film and television ==
- Curly Bill was played by Joe Sawyer in the 1939 Western Frontier Marshal.
- Edgar Buchanan portrayed the role of Brocius in the 1942 movie Tombstone.
- Robert Foulk portrayed Brocius in three episodes of the Western television series Tombstone Territory: "Gunslinger from Galeville", "Ride Out at Noon", and "Skeleton Canyon Massacre" (1957–1958).
- Harry Bellaver portrayed Brocius in the 1959 episode "Bad Gun" of the series Wanted Dead or Alive.
- William Phipps portrayed Curly Bill Brocius on the TV series The Life and Legend of Wyatt Earp.
- Robert Yuro played Brocius in the episode "A Mule ... Like the Army's Mule" (October 5, 1968) of the television anthology series, Death Valley Days, hosted by Robert Taylor, and also starring Sam Melville as Army Lt. Jason Beal and Luke Halpin as Sandy King, the youngest member of the Brocius gang at the time.
- Wes Hudman earlier played Brocius in the 1955 episode, "Death and Taxes" of Death Valley Days, hosted by Stanley Andrews. In the story line, novice deputy Bud Payson (Wayne Mallory), while courting the sheriff's daughter, June (Eve Brent), enlists the aid of Curly Bill Brocius to assist him in collecting property taxes from a large area of the Death Valley country, which had not been previously taxed.
- Curly Bill was portrayed by Jon Voight in the 1967 film Hour of the Gun, which begins with the Gunfight at the O.K. Corral and continues with a somewhat accurate account of the aftermath. The death of Curly Bill was inaccurate.
- Curly Bill was portrayed by Powers Boothe in the 1993 film Tombstone.
- Curly Bill was portrayed by Lewis Smith in the 1994 film Wyatt Earp.
