= Billy Clanton =

Outlaw of the old American West (1862–1881)

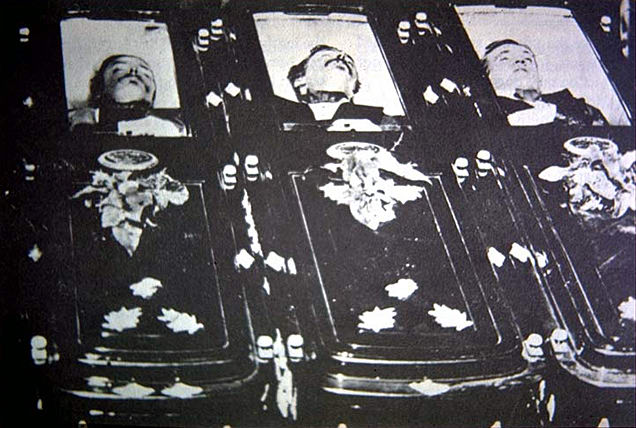
- Billy Clanton (right) in his coffin with the McLaury brothers beside him
- Born: William Harrison Clanton; November 28, 1862; Hamilton County, Texas, C.S.
- Died: October 26, 1881 (aged 18); Tombstone, Arizona Territory, U.S.
- Cause of death: Gunshot wounds
- Occupations: Ranch hand, miner, rustler
- Parent(s): Newman Haynes Clanton and Mariah Sexton Kelso

William Harrison Clanton (November 28, 1862 – October 26, 1881) was an American outlaw who was a member of the Cochise County Cowboys in the Arizona Territory. He, along with his father Newman Clanton and brother Ike Clanton, worked a ranch near the boomtown of Tombstone and stole livestock from Mexican and American ranchers.

He was a member of a group of loosely organized outlaws who had ongoing conflicts with lawmen Wyatt, Virgil, and Morgan Earp. The Clantons repeatedly threatened the Earps because they interfered with the Cowboys' illegal activities. On October 26, 1881, Billy, Tom McLaury, and Frank McLaury were killed in the Gunfight at the O.K. Corral in the town of Tombstone. His brother Ike was unarmed and ran from the gunfight. The shootout was his only gunfight. Ike filed murder charges against the Earps, who were later exonerated as having acted within their duty as lawmen.

== Early life ==
Clanton was born in Hamilton County, Texas, one of seven children of Newman Haynes Clanton and his wife Mariah Sexton (Kelso) Clanton: John Wesley, Joseph Isaac, Phineas Fay, Alonzo Peter, Mary Elise and Ester Ann. His father worked at times as a day laborer, a gold miner, a farmer, and by the late 1870s, a cattleman in Arizona Territory.

In 1851 Newman Clanton moved his family to Adams County, Illinois. The family moved to California after the end of the Civil War. Clanton's mother died in 1866.

== Move to Arizona ==
Clanton moved with his family in 1873 to Pima County, Arizona Territory, and then to Charleston. His father started the "Clanton Ranch" in 1877. In the same year prospector Ed Schieffelin discovered silver in the hills east of the San Pedro River on a plateau known as Goose Flats, less than 15 miles (24 km) from the Clanton ranch. The boom town of Tombstone grew within two years from less than 100 to more than 7,000 residents.

Billy Clanton and his brother Ike often went into Tombstone on weekends, and he did business in Tombstone associated with the ranch, alongside the two McLaury brothers. By most accounts, Ike was not well liked in and around Tombstone because he was a drunk and a braggart.

== Livestock thefts ==
A few days after Wyatt Earp's arrival in Tombstone in December 1879, one of his prized horses was stolen. He heard several times that the Clantons had his horse. Almost a year later he got a tip that it had been seen at the Clanton's ranch near Charleston. Earp rode to their ranch and saw the horse being ridden down the street and placed in a corral. He stabled his horse at another corral and telegraphed James Earp in Tombstone to send up ownership papers for the horse to Charleston. Warren Earp brought the papers out that night. Earp testified in a later court hearing, "While I was waiting for the papers, Billy Clanton found out that I was in town and went and tried to take the horse out of the corral. I told him that he could not take him out, that it was my horse. After the papers came, he gave the horse up without the papers being served, and asked me if I had any more horses to lose."

In July 1879, several rustlers attacked a rancho in northern Sonora, Mexico, killing several of the inhabitants. Hunting the murderers, Mexican Rurales led by Commandant Francisco Neri illegally crossed the border into Arizona and were ambushed. Johnny Ringo later said that Old Man Clanton and his sons Ike and Billy were among the murderers.

On August 13, 1881, Billy's father was killed in an ambush Guadalupe Canyon by Mexican Rurales. The Clanton sons continued operating the ranch. On October 25, 1881, Ike, Billy, and the McLaury brothers headed to Tombstone after working to gather scattered cattle, lost during an earlier Apache raid. The events that transpired over that night and the next day have various versions.

== Shooting in Tombstone ==
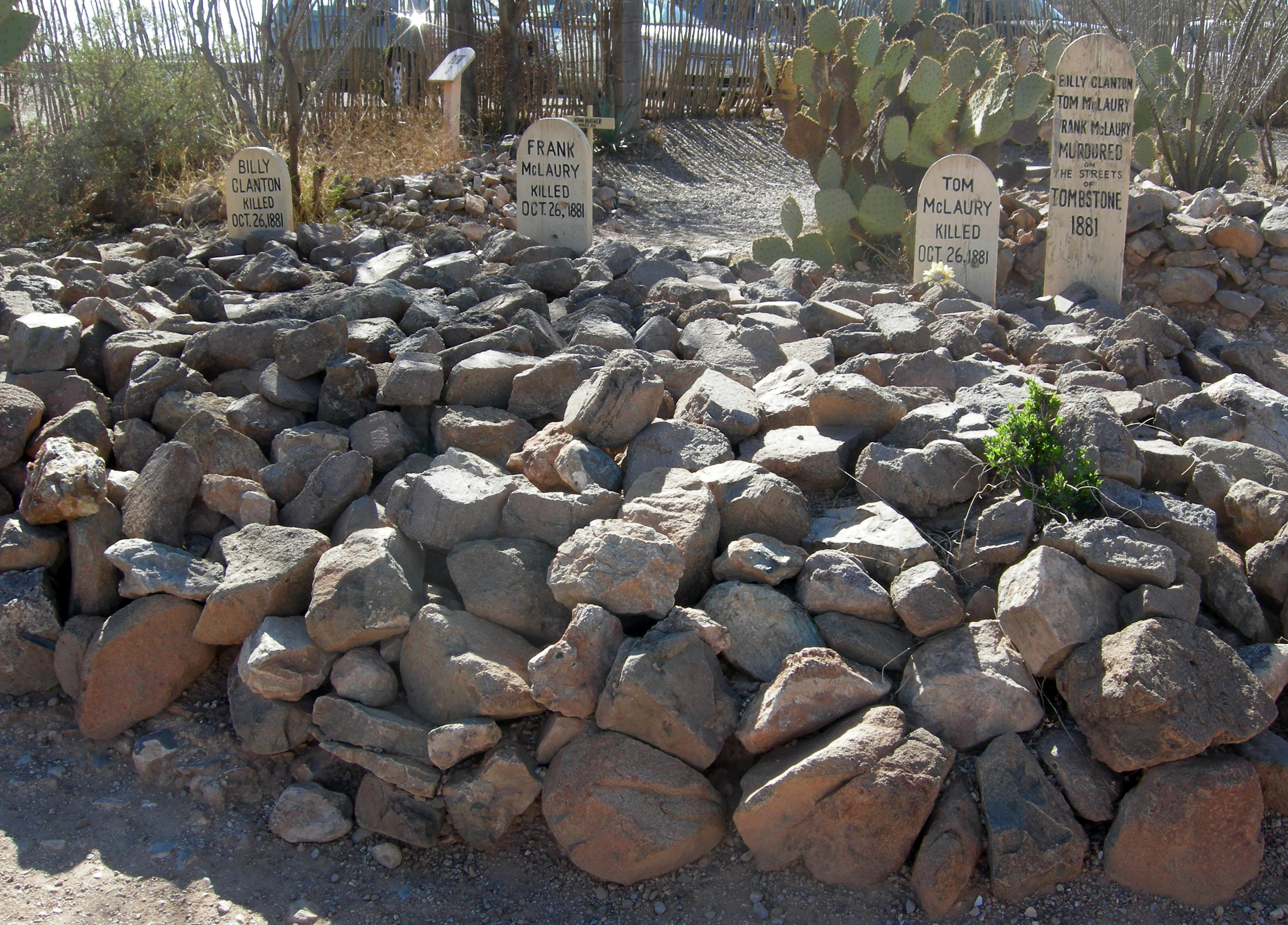
Graves of Billy Clanton, Frank McLaury and Tom McLaury in Boothill Cemetery, Tombstone, Arizona.

Ike had repeated confrontations with the Earps and Doc Holliday. On October 26, 1881, events came to a head when Billy and Ike got together with Billy Claiborne and brothers Tom and Frank McLaury at the Dexter Corral. When they were seen in town "heeled" (armed), anxious citizens warned the Earps. Upon attempting to disarm the Cowboys, a shootout broke out, later named the Gunfight at the O.K. Corral.

There remain today conflicting versions of what actually happened and who fired first. Ike Clanton and Billy Claiborne ran away in the opening moments. Billy Clanton emptied his gun during the fight and was killed along with both McLaurys. Doc Holliday, Virgil and Morgan Earp were wounded in the shootout.

The town was divided, with many supporting the Clantons, and others supporting the Earps. The funeral that followed was the largest in Tombstone's history, with more than 300 people following the hearse and 2,000 watching from the city's sidewalks. The three Cowboys were buried in the Boot Hill cemetery. William McLaury, Frank and Tom's brother, tried to indict the Earps for killing the Cowboys. He wrote in a letter during the preliminary hearing that the two brothers and Billy Clanton were preparing to come to Fort Worth, Texas to visit after selling their cattle.

== In popular culture ==
On screen Billy has been portrayed by James Ferrara in Tombstone, the Town Too Tough to Die (1942), John Ireland in My Darling Clementine (1946), Dennis Hopper in Gunfight at the O.K. Corral (1957), Ralph Reed and Gary Gray in The Life and Legend of Wyatt Earp (1957–1960), David Cole in the Doctor Who episode The Gunfighters (1966), Bruce M. Fischer in Doc, Thomas Haden Church in Tombstone (1993), Gabriel Folse in Wyatt Earp (1994), and Billy Bryk in Wynonna Earp (2020).

Furthermore, Billy is mentioned in the song The Ballad of Boot Hill by Johnny Cash.
