= Dan Tipton =

American miner and gambler (1844–1898)

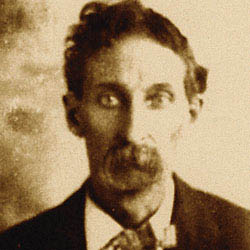
- Born: c. 1844
- Died: February 25, 1898 (aged 53–54); Ohio Federal Penitentiary, Columbus, Ohio, U.S.
- Resting place: Green Lawn Cemetery; Columbus, Ohio
- Occupations: Sailor, miner, gambler
- Known for: Posse member of the Earp Vendetta Ride

Dan Tipton (c. 1844 – February 25, 1898) was an American sailor, miner, gambler, and member of a federal posse led by American Old West lawman Wyatt Earp. He rode with Earp's vendetta during which four outlaw Cowboys were killed.

== Life in Arizona ==
Tipton served aboard the USS Malvern during the American Civil War and drifted west afterward. He showed up in Tombstone in March 1881. When Morgan Earp was assassinated on March 18, 1882, Tipton was present in the billiard parlor where Morgan was killed. Tipton joined Earp's posse after it returned from Prescott. While escorting Virgil Earp and his wife Allie to the train bound for California, Wyatt killed Frank Stilwell who had been named as a suspect in Morgan's murder.

Tipton rode with Wyatt, Warren Earp, Doc Holliday, Texas Jack Vermillion, Hairlip Charlie Smith, Turkey Creek Jack Johnson and Sherman McMaster as they searched for the other Cowboys thought responsible for attacking the Earps. He was with the Earp posse when it rode out to Pete Spence's wood camp where they found Florentino Cruz, a.k.a. Indian Charlie, who had been implicated in trying to kill the Earps. He returned to Tombstone to obtain more funds for the Earps and was arrested on trumped up charges by Cochise County Sheriff and Earp enemy Johnny Behan. While in jail he missed the shootout at Iron Springs on March 24 during which Wyatt Earp killed Curly Bill Brocius because he was bringing money to the Earp posse.

After Tipton was released on March 25, he was given $1,000 to take to Earp, donated by E.B. Gage, part owner of the Tombstone-based Grand Central Mining Company and superintendent of the Grand Central Mine. Gage was also a prominent Republican and a member of the Citizens Safety Committee. He took the money to the Earp party at Henry Hooker's Sierra Bonita Ranch north of Willcox. Gage The posse members looked for more members of the outlaw Cowboys for a few more days before leaving Arizona on April 15 to avoid arrest warrants. Tipton remained with the group through New Mexico and into Colorado, where most of the posse stayed to avoid arrest warrants from Cochise County.

== Later life ==
In 1897, Tipton ran afoul of the law. Customs agents arrested him for smuggling forged Chinese immigrant labor certificates. He was convicted in October and sentenced to 20 months in the Ohio Federal Penitentiary. The 53-year-old inmate lived only four months behind bars before dying of Bright's Disease on February 25, 1898. He left no known family. His body was buried in an unmarked grave at the Green Lawn Cemetery in Columbus, Ohio. In July, 2006, a government-issued tombstone was placed on the veteran's grave.
