= Earp Vendetta Ride =

Search by Wyatt Earp for outlaw cowboys

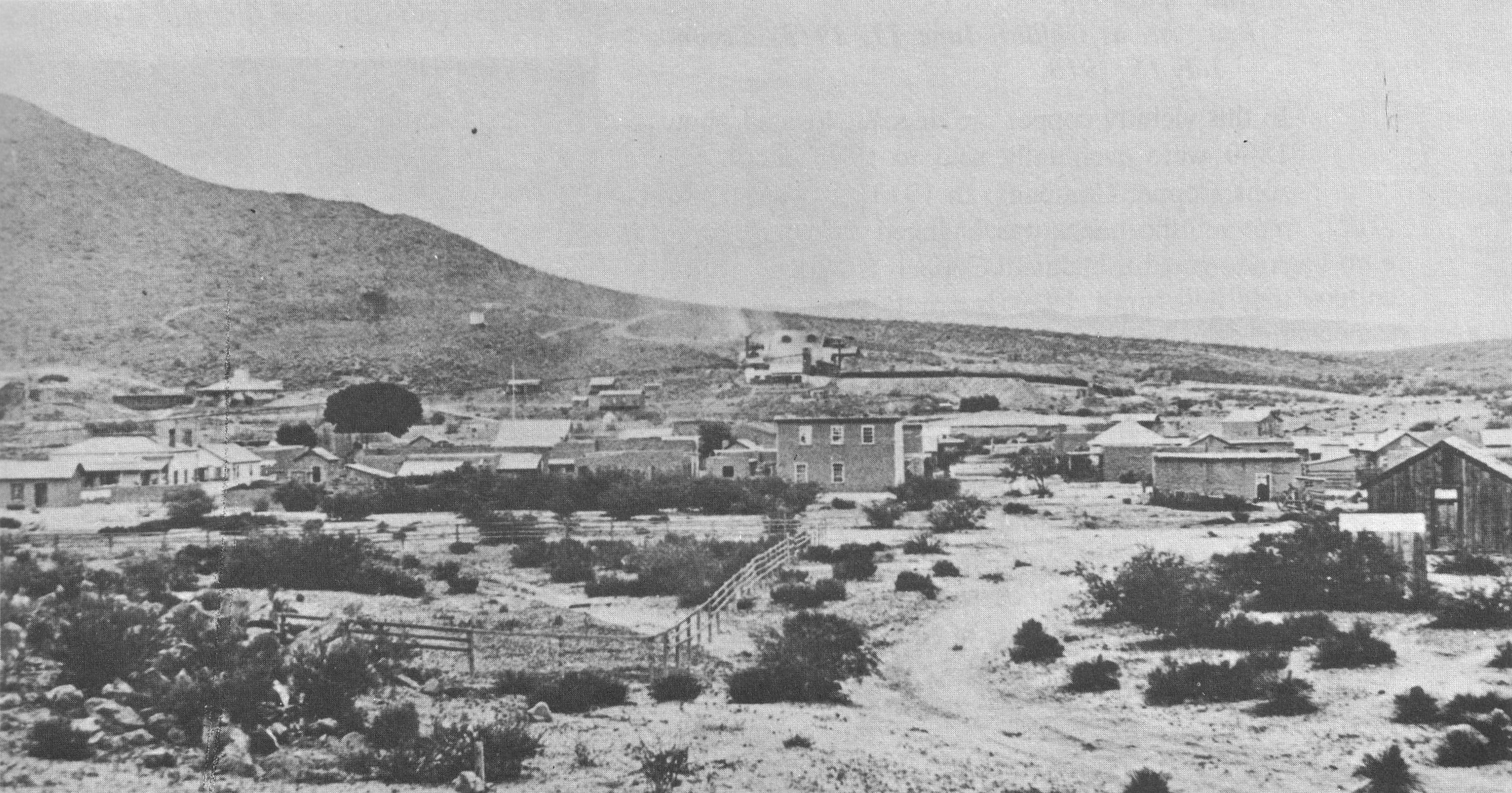
- Wyatt Earp began the search for the Cowboys who ambushed Virgil Earp in Charleston, Arizona Territory.
- Date: March 20 to April 15, 1882
- Location: Cochise County, Arizona Territory, United States
- Participants: Wyatt, Warren, and James Earp; Doc Holliday, Sherman McMaster, Jack "Turkey Creek" Johnson, Charles Smith, Dan Tipton, and John Vermillion vs. Johnny Behan, Frank Stilwell, Pete Spence, Ike Clanton, Florentino Cruz, Curly Bill Brocius, Johnny Ringo, Frederick Bode, Pony Diehl, Johnny Barnes, Frank Patterson, Milt Hicks, Bill Hicks, Bill Johnson, Ed Lyle, and Johnny Lyle
- Outcome: Four Cowboys killed; arrest warrants issued for Earps, Holliday, and others, who leave Arizona Territory
- Deaths: Frank Stilwell, Florentino Cruz, Curly Bill Brocius, and Johnny Barnes

The Earp Vendetta Ride was a deadly search by a federal posse led by Deputy U.S. Marshal Wyatt Earp for a loose confederation of outlaw "Cowboys" they believed had ambushed his brothers Virgil and Morgan Earp, maiming the former and killing the latter. The two Earp brothers had been attacked in retaliation for the deaths of three Cowboys in the Gunfight at the O.K. Corral on October 26, 1881. From March 20 to April 15, 1882, the federal posse searched southeast Cochise County, Arizona Territory for the men they believed were responsible for the attacks on Virgil and Morgan. Several suspects had been identified and were charged but were soon released by the court, owing in some cases to legal technicalities and in others to the strength of alibis provided by the Cowboy gang. Wyatt subsequently pursued the suspects with a federal warrant.

On March 20, two days after Morgan's murder, Wyatt Earp and his brothers Warren and James along with Doc Holliday, and two other deputies were escorting Virgil and his wife Allie to a California-bound train in Tucson. They learned that suspects Ike Clanton and Frank Stilwell were already waiting there. After Virgil, Allie, and James boarded the train, Wyatt spotted two men near the train that he thought were Clanton and Stilwell. He and several men chased down and killed Stilwell but lost the other. After Stilwell's body was found the next morning, the Tucson Justice of the Peace issued arrest warrants for the five lawmen suspected of the extra-judicial murder. When the men returned to Tombstone, Cochise County sheriff Johnny Behan had received a telegram notifying him of the Tucson warrants and attempted to detain the five members of Earp's federal posse named in the warrants, but they ignored him. Still carrying arrest warrants for Curly Bill Brocius and others, they left Tombstone to pursue further Cowboys implicated in the attacks.

Behan formed a Cochise County sheriff's posse consisting of deputies Phineas Clanton, Johnny Ringo, and about twenty other Cowboys and Arizona ranchers. Based on the local warrants, they followed the Earp posse and set out to arrest them. The large sheriff's posse came close to but never engaged the much smaller Earp posse, which received help from local businessmen and ranchers (and at one point, published a letter in a Tombstone newspaper taunting Behan and his men). The federal posse ultimately killed four men, starting with Stilwell and ending with Brocius. About April 15 the Earps and some of their associates rode out of Arizona Territory, headed for New Mexico Territory.

== Background ==
After a long-simmering feud and increasing animosity and threats, Tombstone town Marshal Virgil Earp, Assistant Town Marshal Morgan Earp, and temporary deputy marshals Wyatt Earp and Doc Holliday confronted outlaw Cowboys Billy Claiborne, Ike and Billy Clanton, and Tom and Frank McLaury in the Gunfight at the O.K. Corral on October 26, 1881. The 30-second gunfight is generally regarded as the most famous gunfight in the history of the American Wild West. The lawmen killed three of the Cowboys during the gunfight. Ike Clanton filed murder charges, and after a month-long preliminary hearing, Justice of the Peace Wells Spicer found that the lawmen had acted within their duty. However, Spicer's finding did not end the matter for Clanton and other Cowboys.

=== Attempted murder of Virgil Earp ===
At about 11:30 pm on December 28, 1881, just over two months after the Gunfight at the O.K. Corral, three men ambushed Virgil Earp as he walked from Schieffelin Hall back to the Cosmopolitan Hotel where the Earps had moved for mutual support and protection. He was hit in the back and upper left arm by about 20 buckshot pellets, shattering his humerus. Dr. George Goodfellow, who treated him, had to remove 5.5 inches (140 mm) of bone. Wyatt telegraphed U.S. Marshal Crawley Dake. He requested appointment as Deputy U.S. Marshal for eastern Pima County and authority to form a posse.

Commenting on Earp's request to Dake, the Weekly Arizona Miner wrote on December 30, 1881 about the repeated threats received by the Earps and others.

For some time, the Earps, Doc Holliday, Tom Fitch and others who upheld and defended the Earps in their late trial have received, almost daily, anonymous letters, warning them to leave town or suffer death, supposed to have been written by friends of the Clanton and McLowry boys, three of whom the Earps and Holliday killed and little attention was paid to them as they were believed to be idle boasts but the shooting of Virgil Earp last night shows that the men were in earnest.

=== Wyatt deputizes posse ===
Dake replied affirmatively by telegraph, and Deputy U.S. Marshal Wyatt Earp deputized Warren Earp, Doc Holliday, Sherman McMaster, Jack "Turkey Creek" Johnson, Charlie "Hairlip Charlie" Smith, Daniel "Tip" Tipton, and John "Texas Jack" Vermillion to protect the family and pursue the suspects, paying them $5 a day.

McMaster and Johnson were known as tough men who knew how to use their guns. McMaster had seen service with the Texas Rangers in 1878–1879 when his unit captured and held Curly Bill Brocius prisoner for five months. In Tombstone, McMaster had also been accused of stealing U.S. Army mules and robbing a stage with outlaw Charles "Pony" Diehl. Fluent in Spanish, McMaster used his inside knowledge of the Cowboys to assist the Earps in their search.

Jack "Turkey Creek" Johnson, whose real name according to Wyatt Earp was John William Blount, was a native of Missouri who was raised in the lead mining area near Neosho. Blount was forced to flee Missouri in 1877 after he and his brother were involved in a violent street battle. During May 1881, his brother Bud killed a man in a quarrel in Tip Top, Arizona Territory and was sent to Yuma Territorial Prison. John Blount adopted the alias Jack Johnson and went to Tombstone seeking Wyatt Earp's help to get his brother pardoned. Wyatt helped by writing a petition to Governor Fremont, whom Wyatt knew, and Bud Blount was eventually freed. As a way to repay his debt, Johnson joined the posse.

Charlie Smith had a long-time connection to the Earp family and was fluent in Spanish after spending several years in Texas working in saloons. While in Fort Worth he had been associated with barman James Earp and participated in at least two gunfights there and was seriously wounded in 1878. Arriving in Tombstone in 1879 with Robert J. Winders, Smith immediately became associated with the Earps. Winders and the Earps partnered on the Mountain Maid mine.

Daniel "Tip" Tipton arrived in Tombstone in March 1881. He had a shady reputation earned during the early days of the mining boom in Virginia City, Nevada Territory. Tipton, a former Union seaman in the Civil War, was tattooed on his hands and forearms, and took up mining and gambling after the war. In 1879 he was in the Gunnison district of Colorado before traveling to Tombstone at the request of his friend Lou Rickabaugh, also a friend of the Earps. Smith and Tipton were gamblers who supplemented their income with mining ventures.

John "Texas Jack" Vermillion, a Virginian, joined the vendetta ride after Frank Stilwell was killed and was never indicted for Stilwell's murder, but he was with the Earps when Florentino "Indian Charlie" Cruz was killed. Although closer to friend and fellow Southerner Doc Holliday than the Earps, Vermillion remained by Wyatt Earp's side during the shootout at Iron Springs with Curly Bill Brocius. A veteran of the Civil War on the Confederate side who rode with J.E.B. Stuart's Virginia cavalry, Vermillion was an accomplished horseman and pistoleer.

U.S. Marshal Dake visited Tombstone in late January 1881 with acting Governor John J. Gosper. Dake had previously and unsuccessfully requested financial assistance from the United States Attorney General Wayne MacVeagh to help track down and arrest the Cowboys. Dake's superior told him he must reduce his official debt below the penalty bond of $20,000 before an additional appropriation could be made. In September 1881, Governor Gosper told Secretary of Interior Kirkwood that Arizona contained "a small army of outlaws well armed and fully able to cope with the ordinary civil powers of our counties." Not believing that the federal bureaucracy would provide funds, Dake borrowed $3,000 from Wells Fargo & Co., promising that the Department of Justice would repay it. He deposited money, variously reported as either $300 or $3000, to an account in the Hudson & Company Bank, minus $15, for use "to arrest all parties committing crimes against the United States." The following day John Thacker from Wells Fargo went with Wyatt to the bank to authorize his use of the funds. Dake was later accused although not convicted of spending $300 on gambling and prostitutes while in Tombstone and misappropriating most of the rest of the money.

=== Outlaw Cowboy warrants ===
In January 1882, Wyatt Earp sought and received warrants from Judge William H. Stilwell for the arrest of the men thought responsible for ambushing Virgil. Judge Stilwell was among a number of Cochise County citizens unhappy with Sheriff Behan's failure to stop the Cowboys' ongoing criminal activity.

On January 17, 1882, Johnny Ringo and Doc Holliday had traded threats, resulting in their arrest by Tombstone's chief of police, James Flynn. Both were fined and Judge Stilwell noted that charges were still outstanding against Ringo for a robbery in Galeyville. Ringo was rearrested and jailed on January 20.

On January 23, Wyatt rode with his deputized posse, consisting of his brothers Morgan and Warren, Doc Holliday, "Texas Jack" Vermillion and four others, to Charleston, Arizona where Ike Clanton, his brother Phin, and Pony Diehl were known to stay. Ringo, still in jail, learned that the Earps had warrants and were headed for Charleston. He arranged for bail and Sheriff Behan released him before the bail payment arrived. James Earp immediately filed an affidavit saying Ringo was "an escaped prisoner" and charged that Ringo intended to interfere with Wyatt's execution of the warrants. Ringo immediately rode to Charleston to warn his Cowboy friends.

On the way to Charleston, Earp's posse was joined by 30 more riders from Tombstone. They found Ben Maynard, a known Cowboy associate, outside Charleston and arrested him. With Maynard in front, the posse took over the small town and went door-to-door looking for the Clantons and Diehl. Ringo was rearrested in Charleston, but not before he warned the Clantons and Diehl, who left town. The next day the posse scouted the countryside, eventually stopping at a camp near Tombstone known as "Pick-em-up". Complicating matters, a Tombstone deputy sheriff rode out to Pick-em-up and served a warrant on McMaster, who was accused of stealing two horses from the Contention mine. The Earp posse rode back into Tombstone where Sherman McMaster made bail. He and Charlie Smith took a room at the Cosmopolitan Hotel near the Earps.

On January 30, Ike and Phin Clanton surrendered to Wells Fargo agent Charley Bartholomew and were jailed in Tombstone. They learned that the warrant was not for armed robbery as they thought, but for "assault with intent to commit murder, the specific offense being the waylaying and shooting of Virgil Earp some weeks ago."

On February 2, the Clantons were tried before Judge Stilwell. Ike's hat had been found at the scene and McMaster testified that he had heard Ike talk about the shooting in Charleston later that evening. He said that when Ike learned that Virgil had survived the shooting, Ike said he "would have to go back and do the job over." However, Charleston constable George McKelvey, saloon owner J. B. Ayers, and five others testified that Ike Clanton had been in Charleston and could not have taken part in the shooting. The charges were dismissed for lack of evidence. Wyatt said later that Judge Stilwell told him, "Wyatt, you'll never clean up this crowd this way; next time you'd better leave your prisoners in the brush where alibis don't count."

Ike Clanton refiled murder charges against the Earps and Doc Holliday in Contention, Arizona for their killing of his brother and the McLaury brothers. When he could not provide new evidence, the charges were dismissed. On February 13, Wyatt mortgaged his home to lawyer James G. Howard for $365.00 (about $12,177 today) but was never able to repay the loan, and in 1884 Howard foreclosed on the house. On February 17, the Earp posse left Tombstone heavily armed and with a warrant for the arrest of "Pony" Diehl, who was suspected in a January 1882 stage robbery. Unsuccessful, they returned to town a few days later, hearing rumors that the Cowboys were plotting further revenge.

=== Morgan Earp assassinated ===
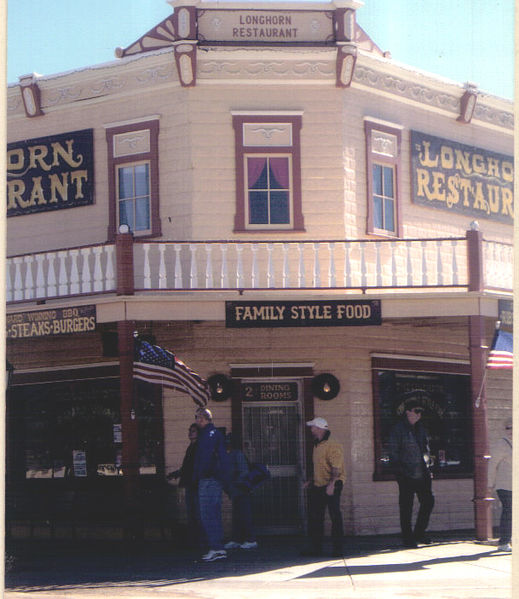
The Longhorn Restaurant is located in what used to be the Bucket of Blood Saloon, the Holiday Water Company, and the Owl Cafe and Hotel. Virgil Earp was shot from the second floor while the building was under construction.

On Saturday evening, March 18, 1882, Tombstone's Scheifflin Hall was host to Stolen Kisses, a play by William Horace Lingard and Company. Despite having received death threats earlier that day, Morgan, Doc Holliday, and Dan Tipton attended. Wyatt and Benjamin Goodrich cautioned against attending. Afterward, Doc went to his room and Morgan and Tipton headed for Hatch's Saloon and Billiard Parlor, which had become their unofficial headquarters after the Oriental Hotel was sold. Morgan and Bob Hatch began a game of pool and Wyatt, Tipton, and McMaster watched. The table was near the back door.

At 10:50 pm, someone fired two shots through the window of the back door. One bullet passed through Morgan, shattered his spine, and then lodged in the thigh of George A. B. Berry. Another bullet struck the wall over Wyatt's head. Wyatt, McMaster and Tipton pulled Morgan out of the line of fire while Hatch dashed outside looking for the shooters. Morgan died within the hour.

=== Cowboy suspects identified ===
While Wyatt and James were traveling to Contention with Morgan's body, Coroner Dr. D.M. Mathew held an inquest into Morgan's death. During the Coroner's Inquest, Pete Spence's wife, Marietta Duarte, implicated her husband and four other men in Morgan's murder. She testified that along with her husband, Frank Stilwell, a man named "Fries" (later identified as Frederick Bode), and two Indians (later identified as Hank Swilling and Florentino Cruz) took part in the killing. She testified that four days before the shooting she and her mother were standing at Spence's house when Morgan walked by. "The Indian then started down the street, & got ahead of him to get a good look at him." She also stated that on the night of the shooting she and her mother heard the shots, and a few minutes later Stilwell and "Indian Charley" came into her home, followed shortly by Spence, Bode and the other Indian.

Marietta Duarte recalled that the men were excited, and the next morning her husband threatened her with violence if she told what she knew. "Spence didn't tell me so, but I know he killed Morgan Earp", she said. Additional witnesses said they saw Frank Stilwell running from the scene.

Like the gunfight three months earlier, Morgan's murder was national news. The Angeles Herald reported:

Tombstone, A. T., March 23.

The coroner's jury find that Morgan Earp came to his death at the hands of Frank Stillwell, (who was killed next day in Tucson), Pete Spence, one Freis, and two half-breed Indians. Pete Spence's wife exposes the plot.

A Sheriffs posse, consisting of 20 men, mostly cow-boys, left this morning for the Dragoon mountains, where the Earps are supposed to be at present. The Sheriff made a weak attempt to arrest them at the Cosmopolitan Hotel before they left, but Wyatt Earp told him he didn't want to see him; that he had seen him once too often, and thereupon the Earp party mounted their horses and rode away. There is a very uneasy feeling among the cow-boy element, as the Earps are rendered desperate by the attempted assassination of Virgil Earp and the cold-blooded murder of Morgan Earp.

The coroner's jury concluded that Spence, Stilwell, Fries, and "two half-breed Indians" were responsible for Morgan's murder.

=== Suspects in jail ===
Unknown to Wyatt, three of the Cowboys he sought were in Behan's jail. After the Coroner's Jury ended, Spence immediately turned himself in, protected in Behan's jail. On the day of the inquest, two of Behan's deputy sheriffs arrested two more suspects for other reasons. Cochise County Deputy Sheriff William Bell brought Indian Charlie from Charleston and placed him under arrest in the Tombstone jail for shooting a man in Charleston. Separately, Cochise County Deputy Sheriff Frank Hereford arrested "John Doe" Freeze [sic]. They were all later released.

=== Wyatt seeks revenge ===
When Wyatt Earp learned of the judge's ruling, he felt he could not rely on the court system for justice. Stilwell had previously been acquitted of two homicides and a stage robbery, and in Wyatt Earp's opinion, he and other Cowboys had gotten away with murder again.

== Stilwell shooting in Tucson ==
On Sunday, March 19, the day after Morgan's murder, Deputy U.S. Marshal Wyatt Earp, his brother James, and a group of friends prepared to accompany Virgil and his wife, along with Morgan's body, to the rail head in Benson. From there James would accompany them to the family home in Colton, California. Morgan's wife and parents waited to bury him. Wyatt borrowed a 10 gauge double barreled Spencer shotgun from Fred Dodge.

=== Earp assembles deputies ===
On Monday, Wyatt received information that Frank Stilwell, Ike Clanton, Hank Swilling, and another cowboy were watching the passenger trains in Tucson intending to kill Virgil Earp. He thought getting the still invalided Virgil through to Tucson safely would require extra help. Wyatt, accompanied by Warren Earp, Doc Holliday, "Turkey Creek" Jack Johnson, and Sherman McMaster, guarded Virgil and Allie. In Contention City they stabled their horses and picked up an extra wagon. They rode in the wagon to the rail head in Benson, where they caught the next train to Tucson.

They were all heavily armed with shotguns or rifles, except Virgil who had a pistol. Nathan W. Waite of Ash Canyon in the Huachuca Mountains was on the train with the Earp party. He said the Earp men were all armed and McMaster was wearing two cartridge belts.

=== Cowboys in Tucson ===
In Tucson, the party was greeted at the train station by Deputy U.S. Marshal Joseph W. Evans. Virgil and other witnesses later reported that they saw Stilwell, Ike Clanton, and other Cowboys at the train station. "Almost the first men we met on the platform there were Stilwell and his friends, armed to the teeth", Virgil later told the San Francisco Examiner. "They fell back into the crowd as soon as they saw I had an escort, and the boys took me to the hotel to supper." Watched over by the well-armed Wyatt and his posse, Virgil and Allie had dinner in Tucson at Porter's Hotel. Marshal Evans saw Holliday deposit two shotguns at the railroad station office.

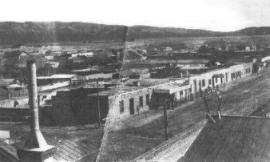
Tucson in 1880.

=== Stilwell killed ===
After the Earp group finished dinner at Porter's Hotel they returned to the train. Holliday asked someone to get his shotguns. Wyatt escorted Virgil and Allie aboard the train. A passenger told Virgil he saw men lying on a flatcar near the engine. Wyatt saw them too and slipped between the tracks, looking for the men. As the train pulled away from the Tucson station at about 7:15 p.m., six or seven shots were heard. Witnesses gave differing accounts, but Frank Stilwell's body was found on the morning of March 21 about 100 yards (91 m) from the Porter Hotel alongside the tracks, riddled with two buckshot and three gunshot wounds. George Hand, who saw the body, said Stilwell was "the worst shot up man I ever saw."

=== Stilwell's wounds ===
Coroner Dr. Dexter Lyford found a single bullet wound through Stilwell's body under his armpits; a wound from a rifle through the upper left arm; a buckshot wound that passed through the liver, abdomen, and stomach; another buckshot wound that fractured his left leg; and a rifle wound through the right leg. The coroner concluded that Stilwell had been shot by five different weapons. Either the gun shot under his arm or through the abdomen could have been the cause of death.

The Tombstone Epitaph reported the next day that Stilwell had been shot six times. They reported that the round of buckshot in the torso had struck him at such close range that six buckshot left holes within a radius of 3 inches (76 mm), leaving powder burns on his coat. Many years later, Wyatt told his biographer Flood that he and his party had seen Clanton and Stilwell on the tracks with weapons, and he had shot Stilwell.

The federal deputies looked hard for another man whom Wyatt identified as Ike Clanton, but he got away. Ike claimed in a newspaper interview afterward that he and Stilwell had been in Tucson to respond to a federal subpoena for interfering with a U.S. mail carrier when he allegedly robbed the Sandy Bob line of the Bisbee stage on September 8, 1881. The federal charges had been filed by Virgil Earp after Stilwell was acquitted for lack of evidence on the state charges of robbery.

Clanton said he had heard that the Earps were coming in on a train to kill Stilwell. According to Clanton, Stilwell left the hotel and was last seen walking down the railroad tracks away from the Porter Hotel towards where his body was later found on the tracks. Virgil later told the Examiner, "One thing is certain, if I had been without an escort they would have killed me."

The next day, the newspapers were full of news about Frank Stilwell's death. The Arizona Star reported,

... without any provocation a band of four or five slayers pursued a lonely man in the dark and without a word of warning murdered him in cold blood and then hied to their stamping grounds as unconcerned as though they had when out on a hunting expedition, or like so many blood-thirsty Apaches rejoice over their crime.

The Coroner's Jury in Tucson found that Stilwell had died at the hands of Wyatt and Warren Earp, Holliday, McMaster, and Johnson. Tucson Justice of the Peace Charles Meyer issued arrest warrants for the five men.

== Earp posse pursues Outlaw Cowboys ==
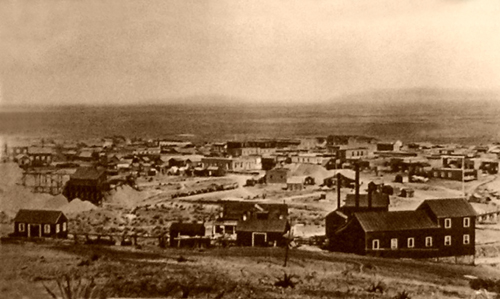
Tombstone in 1881

On the night of March 20, after killing Stilwell in Tucson, and verifying that the train was on its way to California with the rest of their family, the Earp party was afoot. They walked 15 miles (24 km) southeast back along the Southern Pacific tracks out of Tucson to the Papago freight stop. (The station was later renamed Esmond and was the site of a head-on train crash in 1903 at the current location of the Desert Sky Middle School in Tucson.) At the Papago stop they flagged down the night-freight train back to the terminal in Benson.

Once in Benson they hired a wagon back to Contention where they picked up their stabled horses. They rode into Tombstone around 11:00 a.m. on Tuesday, March 21. Once in Tombstone they learned of Marietta Duarte's testimony during the coroner's inquest into Morgan's death. She told the jury that her husband Pete Spence and several others whom she identified had talked about the murder in her home. The Earps returned to their rooms upstairs at the Cosmopolitan Hotel, where they had lived in close company and used as their temporary headquarters since the first attack on Virgil in December.

Wyatt and Warren Earp, J.H. Holliday, Texas Jack, "Turkey Creek" Johnson, and Sherman McMaster were now wanted men due to the outstanding warrants. Tucson, where the Earps had killed Stilwell, was in the jurisdiction of Pima County Sheriff Bob Paul, a friend of the Earps. He and District Attorney Alex Campbell sent a telegram to Behan in Tombstone asking him to arrest the Earps. The telegraph office manager was a friend to the Earps and showed the message to Wyatt before it was delivered to Behan. The operator agreed to delay delivering the message to Behan long enough to allow the Earps and their associates to make ready to leave town Tuesday evening. The Earps sent instructions to Montgomery's stable to get their horses saddled.

John "Texas Jack" Vermillion

Early in the evening Cochise County Sheriff Behan received the delayed telegram. He gathered his deputies and Tombstone City Marshal Dave Neagle. The men met at the door of the Cosmopolitan Hotel, preparing to arrest the five men. The heavily armed Earp lawmen passed through the door of the Cosmopolitan Hotel, on their way to pick up their horses from Montgomery's stable. Behan told Deputy U.S. Marshal Earp, "Wyatt, I want to see you." Without stopping, Wyatt replied, "You might see me once too often." Behan or his posse made no attempt to stop the Earp party.

The Tombstone Epitaph reported, "The Sheriff made a weak attempt to arrest them at the Cosmopolitan Hotel before they left, but Wyatt Earp told him he didn't want to see him; that he had seen him once too often, and thereupon the Earp party mounted their horses and rode away.". One of Behan's deputies, Billy Breakenridge, claimed Wyatt and his men resisted arrest and even pulled their guns on Behan and Dave Neagle, one of Wyatt's friends, to prevent their arrest. In a story published on May 14, 1893, Wyatt told a reporter for the Denver Republican:

The sheriff called on me to surrender, and I told him I would not do it. He assembled a posse about the door of my room to take me in, but I walked through the men, and none of them offered to lay a hand upon me.

Wyatt and Warren Earp, Doc Holliday, Johnson and McMaster were joined by "Texas Jack" Vermillion, Dan Tipton, Charlie Smith, Fred Dodge, Johnny Green, and Louis Cooley to form a federal posse under Wyatt's authority as the Deputy US Marshal. Continuing to ignore Behan, the Earp posse rode out of town the same evening of Tuesday, March 21.

The next morning Behan formed a posse consisting of a number of deputized Cowboys, friends of Frank Stilwell and Ike Clanton, including Johnny Ringo, Phineas Clanton, Johnny Barnes and about 18 more men. They rode after the federal posse and the five men wanted for Stilwell's murder. Paul was on his way to Tombstone the next day when he ran into Behan and his posse on the road 5 miles (8.0 km) outside of town. He joined the posse and rode with them to Contention that night and on to Tombstone the next day. Without sleep for two days, Paul told Behan to wake him if he got news of the Earps' location, but Behan left without him. In 1898, Paul wrote the Tucson Republican that the Earps had spied Stillwell "standing on a gravel car peeking into the window of the car that Virgil Earp was in."

=== Killing of Florentino Cruz ===
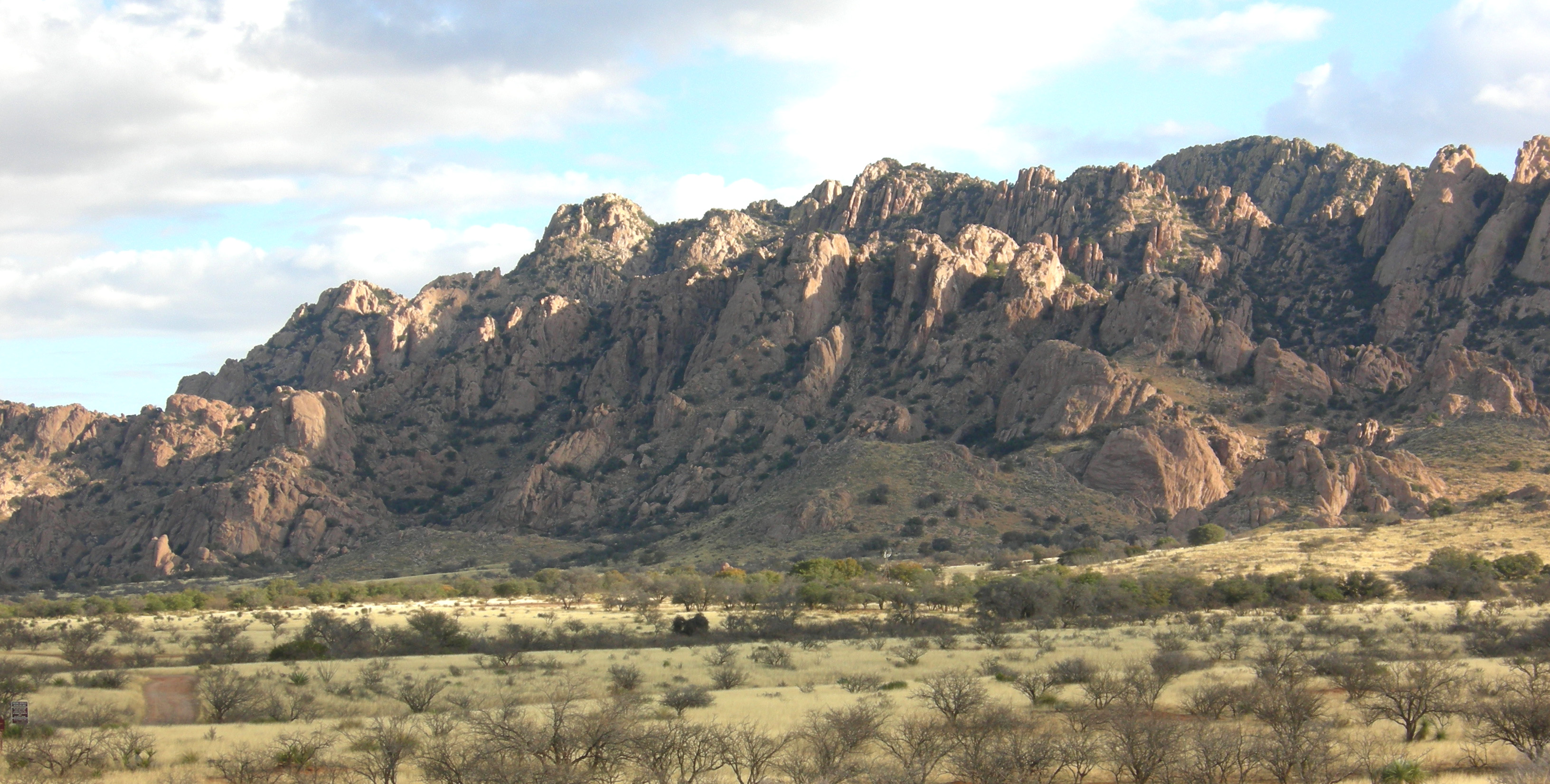
The Dragoon Mountains, from the south.

On the morning of March 22, a portion of the Earp posse including Wyatt, Warren, Doc Holliday, Sherman McMaster and "Turkey Creek" Johnson rode about 10 miles (16 km) east to Pete Spence's ranch and woodcutting camp off the Chiricahua Road, below the south pass of the Dragoon Mountains.

According to Theodore Judah, who witnessed events at the wood camp, the Earp posse arrived around 11:00 am and asked him about the location of Pete Spence and Florentino "Indian Charlie" Cruz. He told them Spence was in jail in Tombstone and that Cruz was cutting wood nearby. They followed the direction Judah indicated and Judah soon heard ten or twelve shots fired. Judah looked for Cruz that night without success. The next morning he went looking for him again and found his body full of bullet holes.

One apocryphal account says that after the party recognized Cruz, they chased him down and a gunfight ensued. The party managed to capture a fatally wounded Cruz and he confessed to have taken part in Morgan's murder, and that he identified Stilwell, Hank Swilling, Curly Bill and Johnny Ringo as the others who killed Morgan. During that time, in Wyatt's own account, he allowed Cruz to keep his revolver in his holster to "give him a chance to fight like a man". After Cruz's confession, Wyatt gave him the permission to draw his revolver, which Cruz did, but Wyatt managed to draw his gun first and killed him with one shot. Wyatt's account of him killing Cruz in a duel is contradicted by Cruz' fatal wounds, one to the temple and the second through his right side.

=== Behan arrests two ===
On Thursday, March 23, Smith and Tipton left the main body of the posse to obtain information and money in Tombstone. The rest of the posse rode west about 12 miles (19 km) and on the night of March 23 stayed in a campsite northwest of Tombstone, between Contention and Drew’s Station. Behan saw Smith and Tipton in town and arrested them for "resisting arrest and conspiracy." The men immediately paid their bond. Smith left Tombstone to rejoin the federal posse but Tipton remained behind. When Smith rejoined the group, Earp asked him to return to town and raise $1,000 to cover the posse's expense. Earp later said he told Smith, “Meet us at Iron Springs, and don’t lose any time. We’ll be waiting there.”

On March 27 Smith and Tipton were brought before Judge A.J. Felter in Tombstone. The defense asked the judge to dismiss the charges because Behan lacked a warrant and the judge agreed, freeing the men.

=== Cruz autopsy ===
The Arizona Weekly Star had previously identified "Florentino Saiz" as "the 1878 murderer of Deputy U.S. Marshals Cornelius Finley and John Hicks Adams on September 2, 1878, and Cruz and Saiz may have been the same person.

On Friday, March 24 in Tombstone, Dr. George Goodfellow, acting as coroner, examined Cruz's body. At the coroner's inquest, Goodfellow testified that he found four wounds in Cruz: one shot through his right temple entering the brain; a "slight flesh wound to the right shoulder"; a third entering his right side and exiting to the right of his spine; and the fourth hitting him in the left thigh and exiting "seven or eight inches above the point of entry." He stated that either the first or third wound were sufficient to cause death. The coroner's jury ruled that Cruz had been killed by Wyatt and Warren Earp, Sherman McMaster, Jack Johnson, Doc Holliday, Texas Jack and two other unnamed gunmen (Dan Tipton and Charlie Smith).

On the day of the inquest, Arizona Territory Governor Tritle arrived in Tombstone to look into the "sad state of affairs here." On the same day, the two remaining members of the Earp family departed Tombstone. The Tombstone Epitaph reported that both James Earp's wife Bessie and Wyatt's common-law wife Mattie were departing for Colton, California, where the rest of the Earp family had moved.

=== Gunfight with Curly Bill ===
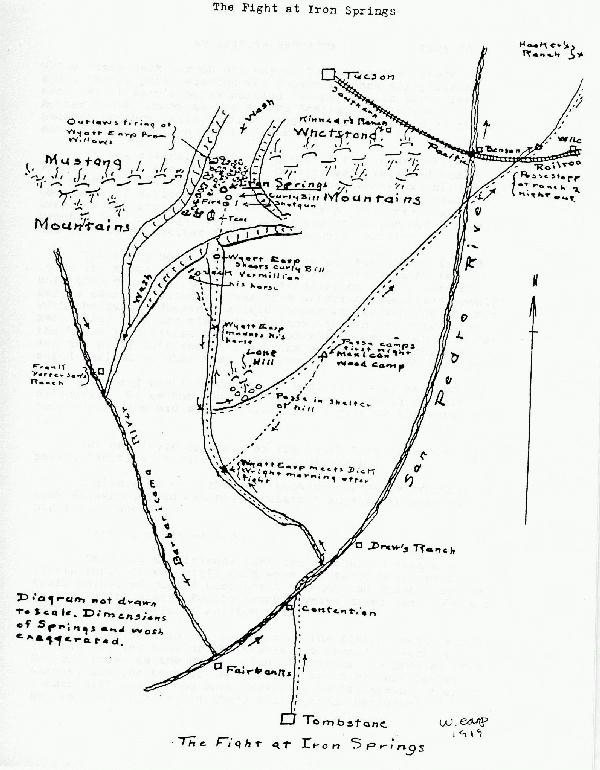
In 1919, with the help of John Flood, Wyatt Earp drew a map showing the location of Iron Springs.

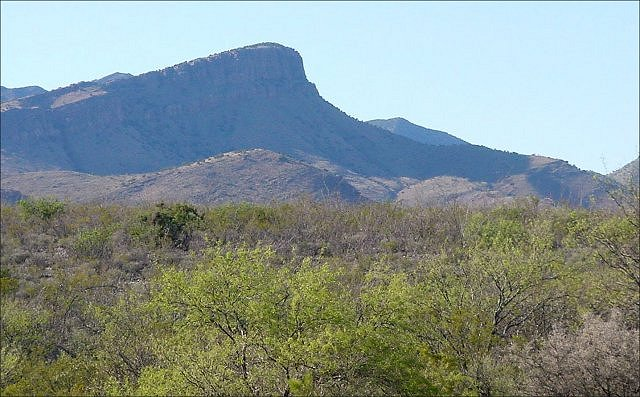
The Whetstone Mountains

On Friday, March 24, the Earp posse, including Wyatt, Warren, Doc Holliday, Sherman McMaster, and Texas Jack, rode west about 12 miles (19 km) from their overnight campsite about halfway between Contention and Drew's Station. The federal posse rode westerly up a wash towards a prearranged meeting place at a springs, where they expected to meet Smith, who was to bring $1000 from Tombstone, about 20 miles (32 km) to the east.

The springs were identified by Wyatt Earp as "Iron Springs," but the location was reported the next day by The Tombstone Epitaph as "Burleigh Springs", about 8 miles (13 km) south of Tombstone and 4 miles (6.4 km) east of Charleston. The spring was located in the Whetstone Mountains west of Tombstone and was later renamed Mescal Springs. Some modern researchers believe it is actually Cottonwood Springs, but the actual location is uncertain.

With Wyatt and Doc Holliday in the lead, the six lawmen surmounted a small rise overlooking the springs and were surprised to find nine Cowboys already there: Curly Bill, Pony Diehl, Johnny Barnes, Frank Patterson, Milt Hicks, Bill Hicks, Bill Johnson, Ed Lyle, and Johnny Lyle. They were camped about the springs, cooking a meal, less than 30 feet (9.1 m) down a slight embankment. Once again, the odds were not in the lawmen's favor.

=== Curly Bill's death ===
Recognizing Earp, Curly Bill fired his shotgun without warning at Wyatt but missed. Eighteen months earlier, Wyatt had protected Curly Bill against a mob ready to lynch him for killing Tombstone Town Marshal Fred White, and then provided testimony that helped spare Curly Bill from a murder trial. Wyatt Earp and Doc Holliday wrote about the fight, and Fred Dodge interviewed three participants afterward. Earp dismounted, carrying a 22-inch, 10-gauge stagecoach shotgun he had borrowed from Fred Dodge. The other Cowboys fired at the lawmen. "Texas Jack" Vermillion’s horse was killed and fell on him, pinning his leg. Vermillion was unable to retrieve his rifle wedged in the scabbard under his fallen horse. Doc Holliday pulled Vermillion from under his horse, and they, Johnson and McMaster shot at the Cowboys as they sought cover.

Wyatt returned fire across his horse with his own shotgun and hit Curly Bill in the chest, almost cutting him in half. Curly Bill fell into the water by the edge of the spring and lay dead. The lawmen's fire was so intense that, according to Johnny Barnes, the Cowboys who could, "got away."

After killing Brocius, Earp fired his pistol and shot Johnny Barnes in the chest and Milt Hicks in the arm. Attempting to remount his horse, Wyatt had trouble getting up into the saddle because his cartridge belt had slipped down around his thighs. He was finally able to get on his horse and retreat.

=== Wyatt unhurt ===
The Cowboys fired a number of shots at the Earp party without effect. McMaster was grazed by a bullet that cut through the straps of his field glasses or possibly his coat. Later accounts of the gun fight varied. Wyatt reported that his long coat was punctured by bullets or buck shot on both sides. Another bullet struck his boot heel and his saddle-horn was hit as well, burning the saddle hide and narrowly missing Wyatt. In his unpublished 1926 biography of Earp, John H. Flood wrote,

The saddle-horn had been splintered, his coat hung in shreds, there were three holes through the legs of his trousers, five holes through the crown of his sombrero, and three through the brim.

Ed Colburn wrote in a letter published in the Ford County Globe on May 23, 1882 that he had visited with Wyatt and Warren Earp in Gunnison, Colorado. In the letter he relayed Earp's story about how his overcoat was hit on both sides of his body by a charge of buckshot and that his saddle horn was shot off.

The Tombstone Epitaph reported on March 27 that Wyatt "received seven shots through his clothes," and that McMaster's clothing was shot through once, that Texas Jack's horse had been killed, and the pommel of Wyatt's saddle had been shot off.

Flood described Vermillion several times as being a relative stranger to the Earps, although he had been one of Virgil's city deputies. Wyatt was reportedly impressed by Vermillion's steadfastness in helping to avenge his brothers.

=== Curly Bill death refuted ===
The Epitaph reported that Curly Bill had been killed, though they noted the repeated denials by the Cowboys. Dick Wright and Tony Kraker insisted they had seen the Cowboys near Drew's Ranch below Contention, who had reported that they had shot the pommel off Wyatt's horse, and he had shot at them without effect.

Wyatt told Flood that Brocius's friends buried Curly Bill on the Patterson ranch near the Babocomari River. Frank Patterson was a member of the Cowboy party, and his ranch was close to the original McLaury ranch site. The McLaurys moved their operation to Sulphur Springs Valley in late 1880. The Patterson ranch is believed to have originally belonged to Frank Stilwell and was located on the Babocomari River about 5 miles (8.0 km) west of Fairbank. An unknown individual who claimed to be on his way to meet the Earp posse, possibly Kraker or Wright, wrote the Weekly Nugget on March 26 that they had seen a wagon arrive and carry Curly Bill's body away. Rancher Henry Hooker wrote that Wells Fargo agent John Thacker himself had gone to the place where Curly Bill had been buried and had the body dug up. Thacker identified Curly Bill's body and then saw that it was reinterred."

Johnny Barnes recovered somewhat after the shooting but later died of his wound. Wells, Fargo & Co. undercover agent Fred Dodge, riding with the Cowboys, wrote that Barnes had told him that he had shot Virgil Earp. Dodge also wrote in the 1920s that Barnes had told him that Wyatt Earp had killed Brocius.

You will recollect that J.B. Ayers kept the saloon in Charleston that was the headquarters for all the outlaw and rustler element. This man, Ayers, for personal reasons that would take too long to tell supplied me with reliable information. Through him I got in touch with several others. Johnny Barnes, whom you will recollect was in the fight at Iron Springs, gave me much information, not only of that, but of many other things before he was killed. Afterwards, all that they said with reference to Curly Bill was corroborated by Ike Clanton himself!

=== Cowboy suspects freed ===
On Saturday, March 25, the Tucson Grand Jury indicted Pete Spence, Frank Stilwell, Florentino Cruz, Frederick Bode, and "John Doe" (Fries) for Morgan Earp's murder. Pete Spence's trial began on April 2, but ended on April 5 when the prosecution called Marietta Spence to repeat the testimony she had given at the Coroner's Inquest. The defense objected that her testimony was hearsay and that as a spouse she could not testify against her husband. Without her testimony, the prosecution had insufficient evidence. They dropped its case against Spence and Bode and the court dismissed the charges.

=== Earp posse pursued by Behan posse ===
On the same day, the Earp party arrived from Iron Springs to an area outside Tombstone and met with supporters, including Charlie Smith and Dan Tipton. They were hoping to receive $1,000 contributed by mining owner and Earp supporter E.B. Gage from Smith, but after Smith was arrested by Behan, Tony Kraker and "Whistling Dick" Wright were chosen to carry it, and they had not returned. Gage had meanwhile learned of his mother's death and had left town for the east coast. Later that day the Earp party rode north towards Henderson Ranch near where they fed and watered their horses. Cochise County Deputy Sheriff Frank Hereford was at the ranch but didn't show himself in fear of his safety, although the Earp party had only "the greatest respect" for him.

On March 25, Sheriff Behan formed a posse that included known criminals including Johnny Ringo, Phin Clanton and Johnny Barnes. The 25-man posse left Tombstone and searched east of town for the Earp posse for a while before turning back for the night. At around 6:30 a.m. the next day, Behan led a 15-man posse from Tombstone, headed for the Dragoon Mountains, and they returned that night. The Earp posse camped Sunday night, March 26 a mile north of Henderson Ranch and left at 7:00 a.m. the next day for the Sierra Bonita Ranch of Henry C. Hooker, a wealthy and prominent rancher.

On April 10th, The Tombstone Epitaph printed a letter from an unknown member of the Earp party that recited some of the group's actions after leaving Tombstone and revealed that they were still in the area. The writer said the Wyatt posse left Tombstone on the evening of March 25 and camped 6 miles (9.7 km) north of town. The next day they headed for Dragoon Summit Station where they awaited the train and a messenger. They had dinner while waiting for the eastbound train "expecting a friendly messenger". It is not known what they were hoping to find.

=== Arrival at Hooker Ranch ===
When they arrived at Hooker's ranch, he congratulated Earp on killing Curly Bill Brocius. He fed the men and their mounts. When Behan's posse was spotted in the distance, Hooker suggested Wyatt make his stand there, but Wyatt moved into the hills about three miles distant near Reilly Hill. When Sheriff Behan and his posse arrived at the Sierra Bonita Ranch on Tuesday morning, March 28, at 7:00 a.m., Hooker refused to provide Behan any information and "damned the officers and the law they represented." Upon payment, he provided Behan's posse and horses with food and water, but would not supply them with fresh horses. Behan and undersheriff Woods sought the assistance of Indian Scouts under the command of Colonel Biddle at Ft. Grant, but were unsuccessful, even upon offering a $500 reward for assistance. They rejoined the remainder of the posse who had lost the Earps' posse trail and went to Eureka Springs.

Former Pima County Sheriff Bob Paul, who had been in Tombstone at the time and volunteered to ride with the Behan posse, wrote a letter to the Tucson Citizen on March 3, 1898 in response to an earlier story he said was full of errors. He said the Earp posse had told Hooker to tell Behan and his posse where they were camped. Hooker told Behan where the Earps were camped but the posse left in the opposite direction. The Nugget reported that the Behan posse did not return until Friday.

Early that same morning, Dan Tipton arrived in Willcox on the morning train, rented a horse, and started north, presumably towards the Earp's location and carrying the $1,000 from E.B. Gage for the posse. The Nugget reported that Tipton left on the 5 o'clock stage to catch up with the party near Hooker's ranch.

The Earp posse also received some money from Louis Cooley, a stage driver and an employee of Wells Fargo, who gave funds from the express company. On April 15, Cooley traveled to Contention and Benson on business for Wells Fargo, where he met General Superintendent J.J. Valentine. When he arrived in Willcox to complete his business, Behan was there to arrest him. Behan's warrant accused Cooley of "aiding and abetting the Earps." The Tombstone Epitaph labeled the charges as "frivolous" and said a lawsuit would be filed against Behan. Judge Wells Spicer dismissed the charges.

While the location of the federal posse led by Wyatt Earp was well-known to most members of the public, Behan's posse never caught up with them. For their vain effort to find and arrest Wyatt Earp and the other four charged in Stillwell's murder, Behan's 25 man posse was paid $5 per day plus $3 per day for horse care for the 10 days they were on the trail. The total bill to the county taxpayers was $2,070.70.

=== Earp posse leaves Arizona Territory ===
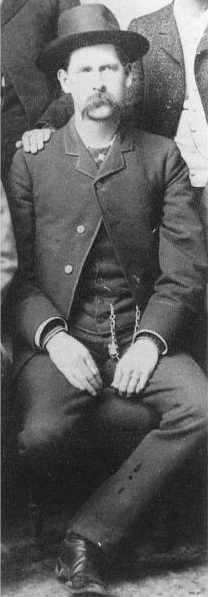
Wyatt Earp in Dodge City, June 1883, fifteen months after the vendetta ride.

On April 3, The Tombstone Epitaph reported that the Earp posse had eaten breakfast in town on March 27, and had been spotted six days later on April 2 20 miles (32 km) north of Hooker's ranch, and that the Albuquerque Journal and San Francisco Daily Report both reported on March 28 that the Earp party had already passed through Albuquerque. It also noted that Virgil Earp and his wife were in Los Angeles that week. The newspaper commented, "This is the wisest course they could pursue. Their lives were not safe for a moment in Tombstone, even if they gave themselves up to the authorities, for the sheriff is inimical to them, and they felt that in his hands they would be entirely at the mercy of the cowboys."

Published on April 10, a member of the Earp party told The Tombstone Epitaph that they were still in the Arizona Territory. This anonymous member of the party reported that from Hooker's ranch they rode 5 miles (8.0 km) north to Eureka Springs where they camped for the night. They spotted the Behan posse from that location but avoided drawing their attention. They stayed near Cottonwood the next night, possibly a mill site near the southwest end of the Whetstone Mountains, from which they picked up the trail of fugitive Frank Jackson. The Tombstone Epitaph reported that he was wanted on a $2,500 reward. The Earp posse arrested Jackson on April 4 and turned him over to Detective Jack Duncan.

On April 12, 1882, the Weekly Nugget reported that Wyatt and his fellow "fugitives" were camped in a canyon near the Sierra Bonita Ranch. Wyatt was quoted as publicly challenging Cochise County Sheriff Behan to come find him there.

Sometime from April 10 to April 14, the group headed east out of Arizona. They stopped at Camp Grant before they left the Arizona Territory and Wyatt signed some property over to his sister. Colonel James Biddle told the Earps that warrants had been issued for their arrest and he would have to hold them. He invited them in for a meal. When they finished the meal, they found fresh horses ready for them to continue their ride east.

They rode east again the next day and on April 15, 1882, stopped in Silver City, New Mexico Territory. They spent one night in the home of a friend, and the next day sold their horses and saddles before taking a stage to Deming. From there they took the train to Albuquerque, where they remained for two weeks. To avoid drawing undue attention from their enemies, the Earps visited the offices of the two newspapers and persuaded them to not write any stories about their presence.

== Wyatt and Doc Holliday part ways ==
Wyatt and Holliday, who had been fast friends since Holliday saved Earp's life in Dodge City during 1878, had a serious disagreement and parted ways in Albuquerque. According to a letter written by former New Mexico Territory Governor Miguel Otero, Wyatt and Holliday were eating at The Retreat Restaurant in Albuquerque owned by "Fat Charlie" "when Holliday said something about Earp becoming 'a damn Jew-boy.' Earp became angry and left…. [Henry] Jaffa told me later that Earp’s woman was a Jewess. Earp did kiss the mezuzah when entering the house." Wyatt was staying with a prominent businessman Henry N. Jaffa, who was also president of New Albuquerque’s Board of Trade. Jaffa was also Jewish, and based on the letter, Earp had while staying in Jaffa’s home honored Jewish tradition by kissing the mezuzah upon entering his home. According to Otero's letter, Jaffa told him that "Earp’s woman was a Jewess." Earp's anger at Holliday's religious slur may indicate that the relationship between Josephine Marcus and Wyatt Earp was more serious at the time than is commonly known. The Albuquerque Evening Review reported that Doc Holliday "became intoxicated and indiscreet in his remarks, which offended Wyatt and cause the party to break up. Holliday going with Tipton." Holliday told a reporter from the Pueblo Colorado Chieftain two days later that, "We had a little misunderstanding, but it didn't amount to much."

The group split up. They were leaving the uncertain justice of the American Frontier for the more defined justice of the federal and state court system. On about April 29, 1882, Wyatt Earp and his brother Warren, McMaster, Johnson, and Vermillion took the train from Albuquerque to Trinidad and then Gunnison, Colorado, where they set up camp on the outskirts of town. They rarely went into town at first, except for supplies. Eventually, Wyatt took over a faro game at a local saloon. Holliday and Dan Tipton headed to Pueblo and then Denver. The split didn't last long. Less than two weeks later, Holliday was arrested on the Arizona warrant for killing Frank Stilwell. Wyatt intervened on Holliday's behalf and persuaded Trinidad city Marshal Bat Masterson to fabricate bunco charges against Holliday. Masterson then persuaded Colorado Governor Pitkin to refuse to honor Arizona's extradition request. Afterwards, Holliday and Wyatt met again in June 1882 in Gunnison; and then again lastly Holliday was able to see his old friend Wyatt in the late winter of 1886, where they met in the lobby of the Windsor Hotel. Sadie Marcus described the skeletal Holliday as having a continuous cough and standing on "unsteady legs.”

=== Premature rumors of Wyatt's death ===
In Tombstone, rumors flew about the activities of the Earp party. The Weekly Nugget also printed a story on May 13, 1882, reporting that a rumor that Wyatt had been killed was probably true. They cited that a citizen had seen Wyatt at Henry Hooker's Sierra Bonita Ranch in Arizona during the previous week, and that Wyatt had been killed there "presumably by parties who have been following him since he left this place." On the same day, the Los Angeles Herald and Albuquerque Evening Review ran the Tombstone Nugget's story.

=== Story variations ===
Wyatt Earp first wrote down the story about the shootout at Iron Springs more than 11 years after the incident. Wyatt told varied accounts of the shootout at the springs a number of times during his life. Details varied between the different accounts, like getting his saddle pommel shot off, pulling up his loose cartridge belt, exactly when he helped "Texas Jack" Vermillion out from under his horse, the distance at which they initially encountered the Cowboys, and how far Earp dismounted from "Curly Bill". Before his death in 1887, Doc Holliday left his account of the gunfight in which he credited Wyatt as the individual responsible for shooting Curly Bill and another Cowboy.

== Earp extradition sought ==
On May 16, 1882, the sheriff of Arapahoe County, Colorado notified Cochise County Sheriff Johnny Behan that he had Wyatt and Warren Earp in his custody, along with Doc Holliday. Behan applied to the governor for money to go to Colorado to bring the Earps back, but Governor Fremont instead gave the funds to Pima County Sheriff Bob Paul. Paul had received word on the same day from Denver that the sheriff there had five of the Earp party in custody. When Paul arrived in Denver, he served a warrant for Doc Holliday's arrest on charges that he killed Frank Stilwell in Tucson. Wyatt Earp, also in Denver, feared for Holliday's life if he was returned to Tombstone. He asked his friend and Trinidad, Colorado Sheriff Bat Masterson to help get Holliday released. Sheriff Masterson appealed to Governor Frederick W. Pitkin and succeeded in getting Holliday released from jail. Paul also knew of warrants for the Earps' arrest, but he was a friend of the men and never served the warrants.

=== Behan loses popularity ===
While Behan sought to arrest the Earps, his reputation among some citizens was very negative. On May 27, 1882, a "strong Democrat" was quoted in a letter in the Yuma, Arizona newspaper The Arizona Sentinel describing the events following the "murder of the noted desperado Frank Stilwell." Readers may want to know "how these so-called Republican outlaws are regarded by decent, law-abiding people in Tombstone, regardless of politics." The writer was of the opinion that Sheriff Behan wanted the requisition from Governor Fremont such that the "object was to have them assassinated... Neither the Sheriff nor any of his deputies have ever turned a hand to find the murderers" of Morgan Earp. "There is no hope for any honest man to get justice here against these scoundrels as long as Behan is in office." On May 29, 1882, Colorado Governor Pitkin finally refused to honor Arizona's extradition request, allowing Earp and the others to leave the state.

== Other suspects ==
Wyatt and his posse were unable to apprehend or kill the remaining suspects.

- Hank Swilling was last known when he was questioned in August 1878 about robbing the U.S. Mail.
- Frederick Bode was last listed in the 1880 US Census in Charleston, Pima County.
- Johnny Ringo was found dead on July 14, 1882 in West Turkey Creek Valley, near Chiricahua Peak, with a bullet hole in his right temple. The coroner's jury ruled his death a suicide.
- Ike Clanton was wanted for cattle-rustling when he resisted arrest on June 1, 1887. He attempted to draw his rifle on Detective Jonas V. Brighton who shot Clanton through the heart.
- Phineas Clanton was convicted of grand larceny for cattle rustling in 1887 and served 17 months of a ten year jail sentence in the Yuma Territorial Prison. He died in 1906.
- Pete Spence was convicted of manslaughter in 1883 and served 18 months of a five year sentence in the Yuma Territorial Prison. He married his friend Phineas Clanton's widow in 1910 and died in 1914.

== Legacy ==
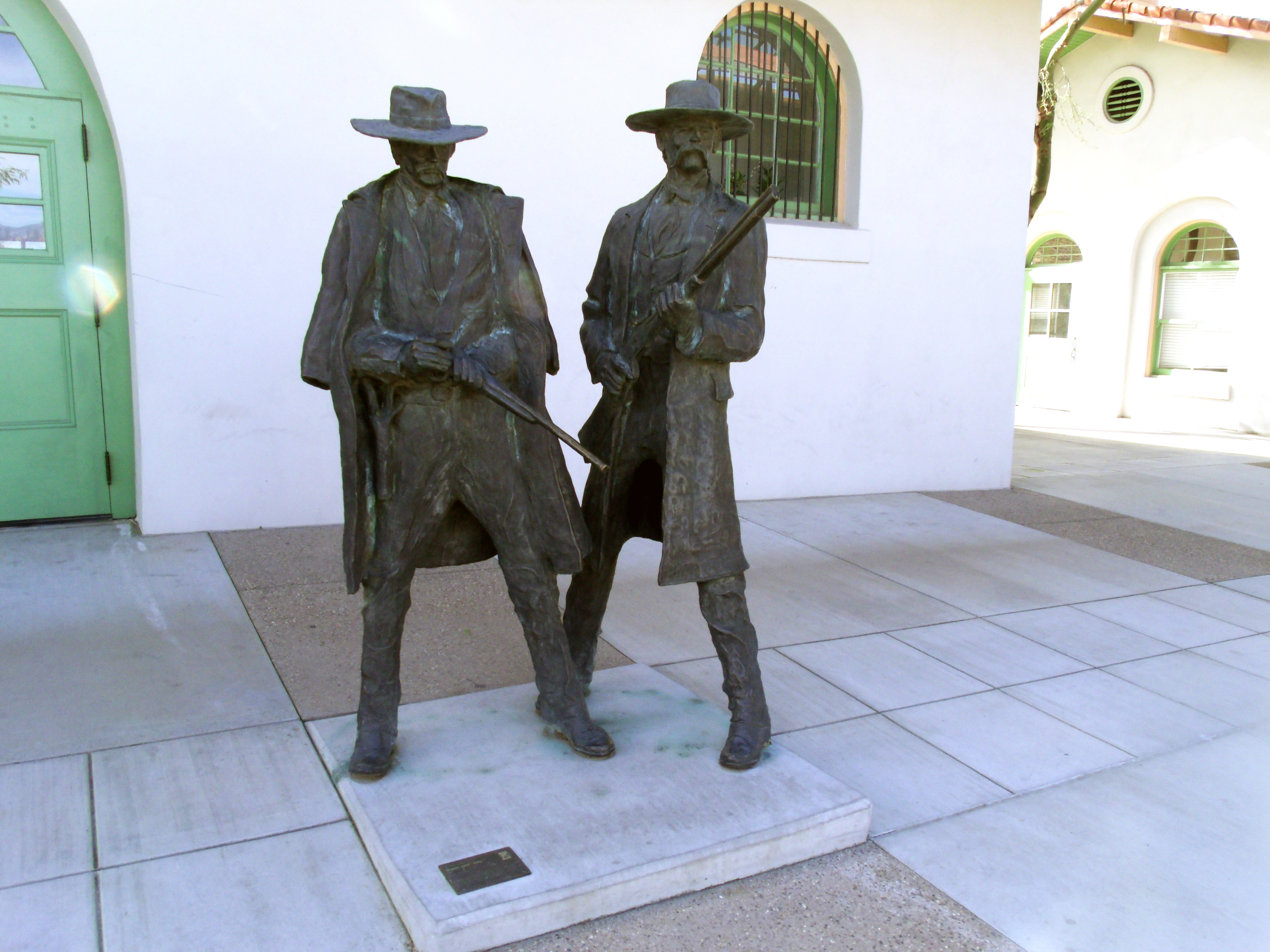
This is the location of the 1880s Tucson Depot. It was in this location where Frank Stilwell, suspected in the murder of Morgan Earp on March 18, 1882, was killed by Wyatt Earp in the company of Doc Holliday. The location is now part of the Amtrak Station at 400 N. Toole Ave. in Tucson, Az.

The 1967 film, Hour of the Gun, which stars James Garner as Wyatt Earp, is centered on the vendetta ride. On March 20, 2005, the 122nd anniversary of the killing of Frank Stilwell, a life-sized statue of Holliday and Earp by the sculptor Dan Bates was dedicated by the Southern Arizona Transportation Museum at the restored Historic Railroad Depot in Tucson, Arizona, at the approximate site of the shooting on the train platform. Wyatt Earp later claimed that "Doc and I were the only ones in Tucson at the time Frank Stilwell was killed".

Long after the gunfight, Johnny Behan continued to spread rumors about the Earps. On December 7, 1897, he was quoted in a story in the Washington Post, reprinted by the San Francisco Call, describing the Earp's lawbreaking behavior in Tombstone. After referring to the highly controversial Fitzsimmons-Sharkey fight for which Wyatt Earp was referee, the article quoted Behan:

The Clanton brothers and the McLowrys were a tough lot of rustlers who were the main perpetrators of the rascailly rife in that region. Between them and Earps rose a bitter feud over the division of the proceeds of the looting. The Earp boys believed they had failed to get a fair divide of the booty and swore vengeance. They caught their former allies in Tombstone unarmed and shot three of them dead while their hands were uplifted." Behan went on to say, "They were hauled up before a Justice of the Peace... Warrants were issued for their arrest, and, summoning a posse, I went out to bring the Earps in. They were chased entirely out of the country and Tombstone knew them no more.

Wyatt's action in taking justice into his own hands became an example of American frontier justice in American history. Wyatt Earp became the archetypal image of a real-life anti-hero.

In 1927, Earp defended his decisions before the Gunfight at the O.K. Corral and afterward to Stuart Lake, author of the 1931 largely fictionalized biography, Wyatt Earp: Frontier Marshal:

For my handling of the situation at Tombstone, I have no regrets. Were it to be done over again, I would do exactly as I did at that time. If the outlaws and their friends and allies imagined that they could intimidate or exterminate the Earps by a process of murder, and then hide behind alibis and the technicalities of the law, they simply missed their guess. I want to call your particular attention again to one fact, which writers of Tombstone incidents and history apparently have overlooked: with the deaths of the McLowerys, the Clantons, Stillwell, Florentino Cruz, Curly Bill, and the rest, organized, politically protected crime, and depredations in Cochise County ceased.

== See also ==
- List of feuds in the United States
- Ten Percent Ring
- Pleasant Valley War
