= James Earp =

Union Army soldier, brother of Virgil Earp (1841–1926)

James Cooksey Earp
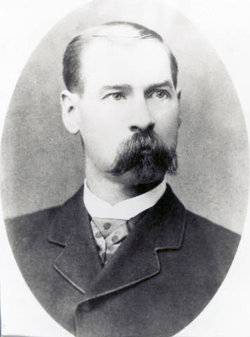
- Born: June 28, 1841; Hartford, Ohio County; Kentucky, USA
- Died: January 25, 1926 (aged 84); San Bernardino, California
- Resting place: Mountain View Cemetery in San Bernardino
- Occupations: Soldier, saloon-keeper
- Spouse: Nellie "Bessie" Ketchum
- Parent(s): Nicholas Porter Earp and his second wife, Virginia Ann Cooksey
- Relatives: Siblings Newton, Mariah Ann, James, Virgil, Martha, Wyatt, Morgan, Warren, Virginia Ann, and Douglas Earp
- Military Service
- Allegiance: United States
- Branch: Union Army
- Service years: 1861-63
- Rank: Private
- Unit: 17th Illinois Infantry
- Conflicts: American Civil War: Battle of Fredericktown (WIA)

James Cooksey Earp (June 28, 1841 – January 25, 1926) was a lesser known older brother of Old West lawman Virgil Earp and lawman/gambler Wyatt Earp. Unlike his brothers, he was a saloon-keeper and was not present at the Gunfight at the O.K. Corral on October 26, 1881.

== Civil War service ==
Earp was born in Hartford, Kentucky, and was reared in a tight-knit family environment. In 1861, at 19, he enlisted in the Union Army at the outbreak of the American Civil War, joining Company F, 17th Illinois Infantry on May 25, 1861.

His brothers Virgil and Newton also enlisted. The 17th regiment was organized and armed at Alton, Illinois. On October 31, 1861, the unit fought Missouri State Guard forces near Fredericktown, Missouri. Over 60 troops were killed or wounded. James was severely wounded in the shoulder and temporarily lost use of his left arm, but he remained in the army for over a year. He was discharged on March 22, 1863, as disabled. Newton and Virgil served until the end of the war.

== Life in the West ==
Following the war, James moved around quite frequently, an Earp family trait. He lived in Colton, California, Helena, Montana, Pineswell, Missouri, and Newton, Kansas, before he wed the former prostitute, Nellie "Bessie" Ketchum, in April 1873.

For some time thereafter, he worked in a saloon in Wichita, Kansas, and then in 1876 as a deputy marshal in Dodge City, Kansas, under Marshal Charlie Bassett, who had replaced Ed Masterson after Masterson's murder. From there he worked in Missouri, Arkansas, and Texas, working in saloons or as stage and wagon driver.

In December 1879, he and his wife moved to Tombstone, Arizona Territory, along with his brothers Wyatt and Virgil. Their brothers Warren and Morgan and his wife Louisa joined them there in late 1880. The three younger brothers became involved in law enforcement in Tombstone, while James managed a saloon and worked in gambling houses.

He was not present at the Gunfight at the O.K. Corral on October 26, 1881. On December 28, 1881, his brother Virgil Earp was ambushed, shot two times with a shotgun. He survived, but only two months later on March 18, 1882, his brother Morgan Earp was assassinated in a billiard parlor.

The New Mexico and Arizona Railroad ended about 25 miles (40 km) away in Benson, Arizona. On Sunday, March 19, Wyatt and James Earp accompanied Morgan's body in a wagon to Benson, where it was loaded onto a freight train for immediate shipping to Colton. Morgan's wife was already in Colton, where she had traveled for safety before her husband was killed. James Earp and two or three close friends accompanied the body to California. Virgil and his wife Allie Earp followed the next day on a passenger train.

Wyatt Earp and James' youngest brother, Warren—with gambler Doc Holliday and gunmen Sherman McMaster, "Turkey Creek" Jack Johnson, and Texas Jack Vermillion—then hunted down those they held responsible for the attacks during the Earp Vendetta Ride.

Morgan was buried in Colton, California. James then lived for a short time in Shoshone County, Idaho, until settling permanently by 1890 in California. James Earp died of natural causes in San Bernardino, California, on January 25, 1926. He is interred there at the Mountain View Cemetery.

== In popular culture ==
- In My Darling Clementine (1946) James was played by Don Garner.
- In Wichita (1955) John Smith played James.
- In Gunfight at the O.K. Corral (1957) James is played by Martin Milner.
- In Doc (1971) James is played by Ferdinand Zogbaum.
- In Wyatt Earp (1994) James is played by David Andrews.
