= Pony Diehl =

American outlaw in the New Mexico and Arizona Territories (c. 1848–c. 1888)

- Born: Charles Ray Diehl c. 1848; Rock Island, Illinois, U.S.
- Died: c. 1888 (aged 39–40)
- Other name: Pony Deal
- Occupations: Cattle rustler, outlaw
- Known for: Membership in various gangs in U.S. Southwest and suspect in attempted assassination of Virgil Earp

Charles "Pony Diehl" Ray (possibly "Deal") was an Old West outlaw in the New Mexico Territory and Arizona Territory. He was accused by Wyatt Earp of having taken part in an attempt to kill his brother, Virgil Earp. Diehl was not tried due to a lack of evidence.

== Early life ==
Pony Diehl was probably the son of German Americans Jeremiah and Mary Hagler Ray and was born in about 1848 in Rock Island, Illinois.

== Outlaw in New Mexico ==
He first appeared in New Mexico during the 1870s, riding with the John Kinney Gang, then later with the Jesse Evans Gang. While with the Kinney Gang, on December 31, 1875, Diehl, John Kinney, Jesse Evans, and gang member Jim McDaniels entered a saloon in Las Cruces, New Mexico. There, they became involved in a brawl with US Cavalrymen from Fort Stanton. A Private was beaten so badly he died four days later. Kinney was also severely injured and his friends carried him outside, and then turned around and shot through the doors and windows of the saloon at the soldiers. According to different accounts, they killed one or two soldiers and a civilian outright and wounded three soldiers or two soldiers and another civilian. Diehl rode with the Kinney Gang through 1875.

In early 1876 he left the Kinney gang to join Jesse Evans, who had also left Kinney to form his own gang. The men were actively involved in cattle rustling and armed robbery, and were joined for a while by Billy the Kid. They were enlisted into supporting the "Murphy-Dolan Faction" in their feud with John Tunstall in Lincoln, New Mexico. Billy the Kid, a friend of Tunstall, left the gang. When the remaining gang members killed Tunstall, they sparked the Lincoln County War, during which Evans and his gang fought Billy the Kid and his "Regulators".

== Life in Tombstone, Arizona ==
After the Lincoln County War, Diehl left New Mexico. He joined "Curly Bill" Brocius and "Turkey Creek" Jack Johnson in late 1878 on a cattle drive to Arizona Territory and Tombstone. He became part of a loose federation of outlaw Cochise County Cowboys that included Ike Clanton, Billy Clanton, Frank McLaury, Tom McLaury, Johnny Ringo and "Curly Bill" Brocius.

Diehl was suspected of being involved in numerous robberies and cattle rustling in the Arizona Territory. He was suspected of being involved in the theft of U.S. Army mules with Sherman McMaster, who Diehl may have known as a child.

=== Ambush of Virgil Earp ===
On the evening of December 28, 1881, Deputy U.S. Marshal Virgil Earp was returning from the Oriental Saloon to the Cosmopolitan Hotel when he was ambushed. Assailants on the second story of an unfinished building across Allen street from the hotel shot Virgil in the back and left arm. He was hit by three loads of buckshot from double-barreled shotguns from about 60 feet (18 m). Dr. George E. Goodfellow was able to save Virgil's arm, but he carried it in a sling the rest of his life.

On January 30, 1882 Wyatt Earp obtained warrants from Judge Stilwell for the arrest of Diehl, along with Ike and Phin Clanton, for the attempted murder of Virgil. He gathered a posse which turned Charleston inside out looking for the Cowboys without success. Wyatt returned to Tombstone to find the men had already surrendered, though they thought it was for lesser charges.

Though Ike's hat was found at the scene where the ambushers waited, a number of associates stood up for him, saying that he had been in Contention that night, and the case against Pony Diehl, Ike, and Phin was dismissed for lack of evidence.

In February 1882, Wyatt Earp obtained another warrant for Diehl's arrest for his alleged participation to a January 1882 stagecoach robbery. Diehl dodged the law when Earp could not find him.

=== Earp Vendetta Ride ===
After attending a theater show on March 18, Morgan Earp was assassinated by gunmen firing from a dark alley through a door window into a room where he was playing billiards. The bullet shattered his spine, passed through his left side, and lodged in the thigh of George A. B. Berry. Another round narrowly missed Wyatt. A doctor was summoned and Morgan was moved from the floor to a nearby couch. The assassins escaped in the dark and Morgan died forty minutes later.

Deputy U.S. Marshal Wyatt Earp felt he could not rely on the courts for justice and decided to take matters into his own hands. He concluded that the only way to deal with Morgan's assassins was to kill them all. He formed a federal posse and set out in search of those he believed were responsible for attacking his brothers. At Pete Spence's wood camp in the Dragoon Mountains, they found and killed Florentino "Indian Charlie" Cruz. Two days later, near Iron Springs (later Mescal Springs), in the Whetstone Mountains, they were seeking to rendezvous with a messenger for them. They unexpectedly stumbled onto the wood camp of Curly Bill Brocius, including Diehl and other Cowboys. According to reports from both sides, the two sides immediately exchanged gun fire. Wyatt killed Curly Bill and mortally wounded Johnny Barnes. Diehl was unhurt.

=== Death of Michael O'Rourke ===
Diehl later claimed he had killed gambler and Earp supporter Michael O'Rourke in 1882. According to Fred Dodge, Frank Leslie told him that O'Rourke shot Ringo in the head and tried to make it look like suicide. Diehl was a good friend of Johnny Ringo. Those who understood the tensions between the parties never doubted he had killed O'Rourke.

== Later life ==
Diehl was later arrested for a variety of crimes, including cattle rustling and robbery, and was sentenced to five years in prison at Santa Fe, New Mexico. He escaped in February, 1885, but was recaptured four days later. He was returned to prison and was finally released in March, 1887, where his name disappeared from public records, though there are some accounts he died in a gunfight.

== In popular culture ==
Diehl was portrayed by Fred Coby in the western television series The Life and Legend of Wyatt Earp.
