= Gunfight at the O.K. Corral (film) =

1957 film by John Sturges

- Release poster
- Directed by: John Sturges
- Screenplay by: Leon Uris
- Based on: The Killer; 1954 article Holiday Magazine by George Scullin
- Produced by: Hal B. Wallis
- Starring: Burt Lancaster; Kirk Douglas; Rhonda Fleming; Jo Van Fleet; John Ireland
- Cinematography: Charles B. Lang Jr.
- Edited by: Warren Low
- Music by: Dimitri Tiomkin; lyrics by Ned Washington main title: Gunfight at the O.K. Corral sung by Frankie Laine
- Color process: Technicolor
- Distributed by: Paramount Pictures
- Release date: May 29, 1957 (New York)
- Running time: 122 minutes
- Country: United States
- Language: English
- Budget: $2 million
- Box office: $10.7 million

Gunfight at the O.K. Corral is a 1957 American Western film starring Burt Lancaster as Wyatt Earp and Kirk Douglas as Doc Holliday, and loosely based on the actual event in 1881. The film was directed by John Sturges from a screenplay written by novelist Leon Uris. It was a remake of the 1939 film Frontier Marshal, starring Randolph Scott, and of John Ford's 1946 film My Darling Clementine.

== Plot ==
Ed Bailey comes to Fort Griffin, Texas looking to avenge the death of his brother at the hands of gunslinger John H. "Doc" Holliday. Holliday's girl, Kate Fisher, spots Bailey and argues with Holliday in his room. Well-known City Marshal Wyatt Earp arrives to take outlaws Ike Clanton and Johnny Ringo into custody, finding the local Sheriff, Cotton Wilson, released them despite outstanding warrants. Holliday refuses to help the lawman, holding a grudge against Wyatt's brother, Morgan. Bailey attempts to shoot Holliday in the back but Holliday kills him with a knife-throw and is arrested for murder. Wyatt and Kate allow him to escape from a lynch mob.

Wyatt encounters Holliday and Kate in Dodge City, Kansas. Holliday has no money, so Wyatt allows him to stay if he promises to behave in town. Gambler Laura Denbow is arrested for playing cards, since women are not allowed to gamble. She is released and allowed to play in the side rooms of the saloon. Wyatt is forced to deputize Holliday after a bank robber kills a cashier and Wyatt's other Deputy Marshals are out in a posse. The bank robbers attempt to ambush Wyatt outside of town, but are instead killed by Wyatt and Holliday.

Kate leaves Holliday for Ringo, who taunts Holliday and throws liquor on him. Holliday steadfastly refuses to get in a gunfight with him. Shanghai Pierce and his henchmen ride into town, wound Deputy City Sheriff Charlie Bassett, and attack a dancehall, but Wyatt and Holliday hold the men and defuse the situation. When Ringo intervenes, Holliday shoots him in the arm. Holliday returns to his room where Kate is waiting, but he refuses to take her back and Kate swears revenge. Wyatt and Laura have fallen in love, but when he receives a letter from his brother Virgil, asking him to help clean up Tombstone, Arizona Territory, she refuses to go with him unless he changes into the man she wants him to be. Holliday catches up to Wyatt on the trail to Tombstone.

Ike Clanton can't herd his thousands of rustled Mexican cattle as long as the Earps control Tombstone's railway station. Morgan Earp criticizes his brother's association with Holliday, but Wyatt insists the gunslinger is welcome in Tombstone as long as he stays out of trouble. Cotton offers Wyatt a $20,000 bribe if he allows the stolen cattle to be shipped, but Wyatt refuses. He returns Billy Clanton to his mother after finding Billy drunk. Wyatt informs Ike that he has been made a Deputy U.S. Marshal, in addition to being a City Marshal, and has legal authority in every county in the United States. The Clantons lay an ambush for Wyatt as he makes his nightly rounds, but kill his younger brother James by mistake.

Ike and five of his henchmen face off against the Earps in Tombstone, a confrontation that ends up at the O.K. Corral. Holliday, despite being ill with tuberculosis, joins the Earp brothers to stand against them. Though Virgil and Morgan are wounded in the gunfight, all six of Clanton's gang are killed, including Billy, who refuses a chance to surrender. After the fight is over, Wyatt joins Holliday for a final drink before heading off to California to meet Laura as promised.

== Cast ==
- Burt Lancaster as City Marshal and Deputy U.S. Marshal Wyatt Earp
- Kirk Douglas as Doc Holliday
- Rhonda Fleming as Laura Denbow
- Jo Van Fleet as Kate Fisher
- John Ireland as Johnny Ringo
- Lyle Bettger as Ike Clanton
- Frank Faylen as Sheriff Cotton Wilson
- Earl Holliman as Deputy Sheriff Charlie Bassett
- Ted de Corsia as Shanghai Pierce
- Dennis Hopper as Billy Clanton
- Whit Bissell as John Clum
- George Mathews as John Shanssey
- John Hudson as Virgil Earp
- DeForest Kelley as Morgan Earp
- Martin Milner as James "Jimmy" Earp
- Lee Van Cleef as Ed Bailey
- Jack Elam as Tom McLaury
- Peter Lawman as Jack Morgan
- Brian G. Hutton as Rick
- Kenneth Tobey as Bat Masterson
- Don Castle as Drunken Cowboy (uncredited)

== Production ==
Gunfight at the O.K. Corral/Last Train from Gun Hill 1963 film poster.

=== Writing ===
The screenplay by Leon Uris is based on a 1954 article in Holiday magazine by George Scullin, entitled "The Killer". The film's plot contains numerous historical inaccuracies and takes liberties with actual events at the real gunfight at the O.K. Corral.

A decade later, director John Sturges made a more historically accurate version named Hour of the Gun, starring James Garner as Wyatt Earp, Jason Robards as Doc Holliday, and Robert Ryan as Ike Clanton. This film begins with a more accurate version of the O.K. Corral gun battle, then covers its aftermath.

=== Filming ===
Sturges made portions of the movie on the set of Paramount Ranch and at Old Tucson Studios. The film was shot in VistaVision

== Historical accuracy ==
On October 26, 1881, the actual gunfight did not take place in an open space like the corral, but rather in an adjacent little street. It lasted less than 30 seconds, while in the film it lasted about 11 minutes. This is only the first of the historical inaccuracies present in the film:

- Virgil Earp was a City Marshal when he arrived at Tombstone, while Wyatt at the time had no legal authority in the jurisdiction of Tombstone.
- Johnny Ringo was not present during the gunfight. Afterwards he committed suicide.
- Ike Clanton accused the Earp brothers and Doc Holliday of homicide. The Cochise County Cowboys asserted that the Earps had killed their cronies in cold blood after they had surrendered. Judge Wells Spicer decreed that the lawmen had acted correctly according to their own authority.
- Morgan and Virgil Earp were wounded during the gunfight, while Holliday was only grazed. Wyatt remained unharmed.
- Wyatt's youngest brother Morgan, not James, was the victim of an ambush in Tombstone. This happened after the gunfight at the O.K. Corral, not before. Even Virgil Earp was involved in a trap at Tombstone following the gunfight, but he was wounded only on the arm, losing the use of the limb.
- James Earp was the oldest of the Earp brothers and he was never a lawman.
- Ike Clanton was never the leader of the Cowboys. "Old Man" Clanton controlled the gang until he was killed in 1881, and the leadership of the band passed to Curly Bill Brocius and Johnny Ringo.
- The film introduces a romantic story that involves Wyatt Earp and a beautiful female gambler, a fictional character (based on Lottie Deno) who had no role in the gunfight and has none in the film.
- Charlie Bassett was the Sheriff of Dodge City when Wyatt was a Deputy. Bassett was older than Wyatt, though in the film instead he is depicted as being younger.
- Doc Holliday did not directly follow Wyatt at Tombstone. He arrived in town only sometime after Wyatt had settled in.
- The real name of the Cochise County, Arizona Territory County Sheriff was John Behan, not Cotton Wilson. The Sheriff was not killed the day of the gunfight, and the band of Clantons did not shoot at anyone in town before the gunfight at the O.K. Corral.

== Reception ==
=== Box office ===
The film was a big hit and earned $4.7 million on its first run and $6 million on re-release.

=== Critical response ===
Reviews in 1957 were generally positive. Bosley Crowther of The New York Times praised the film as "firmly directed" and "ruggedly acted," though he lamented "odd, embarrassing moments when Cupid lets fly with his arrows," and thought that the inclusion of a ballad was too derivative of High Noon. Variety called Lancaster and Douglas "excellently cast" and added, "in its development and exciting climax John Sturges has captured the stirring spirit of the period in his sock direction." Harrison's Reports agreed that the two leads were "excellent in their respective roles" and found the action "tense and suspenseful throughout, culminating in a highly exciting and thrilling gun battle." Richard L. Coe of The Washington Post deemed the film "just what its title suggests — blood-thirsty, empty-headed and good fun of its sort." The Monthly Film Bulletin called it "carefully and lavishly mounted, but it is ultimately overlong and overwrought. Leon Uris's script dulls the final scene of action by the introduction of too many minor climaxes, which never blend."

Its Dimitri Tiomkin score, featuring the song "Gunfight at the O.K. Corral", with lyrics by Ned Washington, sung by Frankie Laine, pushes the movie's momentum relentlessly throughout.

Members of the Western Writers of America chose the song "Gunfight at the O.K. Corral" as one of the Top 100 Western songs of all time.

=== Accolades ===
The film was nominated for two Academy Awards for Best Film Editing (Warren Low) and Best Sound Recording (George Dutton). Burt Lancaster and Kirk Douglas were nominated for Golden Laurel in the category of top male action star.

== See also ==
- Hour of the Gun, 1967 remake by John Sturges with James Garner
- List of American films of 1957
