= Hour of the Gun =

1967 film by John Sturges

- Original film poster
- Directed by: John Sturges
- Written by: Edward Anhalt
- Based on: Tombstone's Epitaph by Douglas D. Martin; Gunfight at the O.K. Corral by John Sturges
- Produced by: John Sturges; Mirisch-Kappa (Production company)
- Starring: James Garner; Jason Robards; Robert Ryan; Albert Salmi; Charles Aidman; Steve Ihnat; Michael Tolan
- Cinematography: Lucien Ballard, ASC
- Edited by: Ferris Webster
- Music by: Jerry Goldsmith
- Production company: The Mirisch Corporation
- Distributed by: United Artists
- Release date: November 1, 1967 (New York City)
- Running time: 100 minutes
- Country: United States
- Language: English
- Budget: $1,800,000 (estimated)
- Box office: $2 million

Hour of the Gun is a 1967 American Western film depicting Wyatt Earp and Doc Holliday during their 1881 battles against Ike Clanton and his brothers in the gunfight at the O.K. Corral, and the gunfight's aftermath in and around Tombstone, Arizona. It stars James Garner as Earp, Jason Robards as Holliday, and Robert Ryan as Clanton. The film was directed by John Sturges.

Sturges had previously directed a highly fictionalized version of the same events in the film Gunfight at the O.K. Corral (1957) starring Burt Lancaster and Kirk Douglas, but in Hour of the Gun, he strove for more historical accuracy than in most previous screen depictions of Earp's adventures. The film is based on the nonfiction book Tombstone's Epitaph by Douglas D. Martin, with a screenplay by Edward Anhalt.

During the film's opening title and credits sequence, an onscreen title appears last: "This picture is based on Fact. This is the way it happened." Hour of the Gun is, in fact, more accurate than its predecessors in many ways. For instance, it correctly shows Ike Clanton surviving the O.K. Corral shoot-out, whereas previous films had shown him being one of its fatalities.

Not everything in the film, though, adheres strictly to fact. It has Ike Clanton ultimately being killed by Wyatt Earp, whereas Clanton actually died in an 1887 duel with a constable named Jonas Brighton. In addition, Hour of the Gun portrays Doc Holliday as a graying Civil War veteran much older than the Earp brothers, though in fact he was younger than most of them and was too young to have served in that conflict. The death of Curly Bill Brocious is inaccurately portrayed as a street shootout between Brocius and two others vs. Wyatt Earp and Doc Holliday. Furthermore, the opening depicts the gunfight as happening at the O.K. Corral, whereas it actually happened in the alley near the corral between Fremont and Allen streets near Fly photography studio.

== Plot ==
Outnumbered but determined, the Deputy City Marshal of Tombstone, Wyatt Earp, his older brother Virgil, who is the current [City Marshal]], his younger brother Morgan, a Tombstone Special Police Officer and ally Doc Holliday, who was made an Deputy City Marshal and given a badge for the occasion, confront and get the best of the Ike Clanton gang in a violent shootout at the O.K. Corral in the Arizona town of Tombstone.

Clanton, a rustler, conspires to have the Earps charged with murder and tried in a court of law. When they are cleared, Virgil runs for re-election as Tombstone City Marshal, but is ambushed and maimed by some of Clanton's hired guns. Morgan elects to run for the office in his brother's place, but he is assassinated on election day after winning.

While seeing Virgil and his family off to California for their safety, Earp kills Frank Stillwell, foiling an attempted ambush orchestrated by Clanton. An appointment as a Deputy U.S. Marshal then gives him the authority to organize a posse and pursue the others involved in the attacks on his brothers. Doc Holliday, a gambler who has been on the wrong side of the law himself more than once, assembles a posse to support the pursuit. The men locate Pete Spence, "Curly" Bill Brocius, and Andy Warshaw. In each case, Earp manipulates the circumstances to get his target to draw a weapon rather than simply surrendering, thus enabling Earp to kill them legally rather than make an arrest. Holliday calls Earp out on his tactics, but his strength gives out due to his tuberculosis, and Earp transports him to a sanitarium in Colorado.

With Clanton weakened, wealthy interests in Tombstone step forward to end the dispute, buying off the men supporting Clanton, which leads him to hide out in Mexico. To entice Earp to remain in Tombstone, the city's leading citizens tell him they are seeking an appointment for him as the Arizona Territory's U.S. Marshal that could one day make him the Adjutant General for the Territory. Earp declines to give his answer to the offer immediately, but tells Holliday that he is going back to Tombstone to accept the job. Holliday does not believe him, and knows Earp is really going to Mexico to track down Clanton with the cooperation of the Mexican federal authorities. Holliday again joins Earp on the mission, which ends with a final showdown in which Earp shoots Clanton dead in a fast-draw duel between the two.

Earp returns to the Colorado sanitarium to visit the ailing Holliday and say goodbye to his friend, telling him this time he really is returning to Tombstone. As he leaves, though, Earp admits to a visiting Tombstone elder that he is leaving the Southwest altogether, intending never to be involved in law enforcement again. Holliday glances at the countryside as his friend rides away, and then resumes his poker game with his sanitarium health aide.

== Cast ==
- James Garner as Deputy City Marshal of Tombstone Wyatt Earp
- Jason Robards as Doc Holliday
- Robert Ryan as Ike Clanton
- Albert Salmi as Octavius Roy (prosecuting attorney)
- Charles Aidman as Horace Sullivan (defense attorney)
- Steve Ihnat as Andy Warshaw (Clanton man)
- Michael Tolan as Pete Spence (new Tombstone City Marshal)
- William Windom as Texas Jack Vermillion (Earp posse member)
- Lonny Chapman as Turkey Creek Jack Johnson (Earp posse member)
- Larry Gates as John P. Clum
- William Schallert as Herman Spicer (judge)
- Bill Fletcher as Jimmy Bryan (Cochise County Sheriff)
- Karl Swenson as Dr. Charles Goodfellow
- Austin Willis as Anson Safford
- Monte Markham as Sherman McMasters (Tucson Sheriff and Earp posse member)
- Richard Bull as Thomas Fitch (attorney)
- Sam Melville as Tombstone special police officer Morgan Earp
- Jon Voight as Curly Bill Brocius (Clanton man)
- Robert Phillips as Frank Stilwell
- Frank Converse as Tombstone City Marshal Virgil Earp
- Jorge Russek as Deputy Latigo

== Production ==
This is the second film by John Sturges about these events, following the fictionalized film from ten years earlier, Gunfight at the O.K. Corral, which had featured Burt Lancaster as Earp and Kirk Douglas as Holliday. Ike Clanton is killed at the end of the earlier film (during the gunfight at the O.K. Corral). In Hour of the Gun, Clanton survives the gunfight and is an antagonist thereafter. Where Gunfight at the O.K. Corral is more about the main gun battle, this film begins with the gunfight and moves forward from there. Hal B. Wallis had scripted everything in the earlier Gunfight at the O.K. Corral and Sturges was disappointed with that film. According to critic Paul Brenner, Hour of the Gun is more of a psychological "melancholy character study".

The film's music is composed by Jerry Goldsmith.

Garner wrote in his memoirs that he agreed to make the film without reading the script because he thought so highly of Sturges. Garner also played the lead as Wyatt Earp in a different film more than two decades later, Blake Edwards's Sunset (1988), a comedy thriller based on the 1920s period during which Earp was a technical adviser for silent films.

Hour of the Gun was filmed in the state of Durango, Mexico; at Estudios Churubusco Azteca (studio) in Mexico City, México D.F., Mexico; San Miguel de Allende, Guanajuato, Mexico; and Torreón, Coahuíla, Mexico.

== Reception ==
At AllMovie, Bruce Eder calls Garner's portrayal of Earp as "taciturn, emotionally repressed, deeply troubled and torn", but criticizes Edward Anhalt's script as being too strict to historical facts and confining the actors, especially Garner. Roger Ebert from Chicago Sun-Times says: "Garner turns in one of his best performances."

== Home media ==
Hour of the Gun was released to DVD by MGM Home Entertainment May 17, 2005, and later on Blu-ray by Twilight Time. The film was also made available in the digital format.

== See also ==
- List of American films of 1967
