= Turkey Creek Jack Johnson =

American Old West figure and Wyatt Earp posseman

John "Turkey Creek Jack" Johnson (circa 1847 – 1887) was an American bookkeeper, lawyer, cattle handler, and lawman. He rode with Wyatt Earp as a member of the posse during the Earp Vendetta Ride.

== Early life ==
Johnson was thought to be a former bookkeeper and lawyer, coming from Missouri. Wyatt Earp believed that Johnson's real name was John Blunt, but no evidence to support this has been found, and Blunt was not a gunman. In 1881, he was 34 years of age. His brothers and he are alleged to have fled Missouri after being involved in a violent street clash in the mining town of Webb City, Missouri. His supposed brother, Bud Blunt, a known drunkard who had killed a man in Tip Top, Arizona, in 1881, was sent to Yuma Prison. Johnson was not actually a "gunman" in the traditional sense, but was inaccurately portrayed as such in Stuart N. Lake's mostly fictional book. Earp claimed to use him as an "informer" on the Cowboys.

== Gunfights 1872 and 1876 ==
Reportedly, Johnson was involved in two gunfights:

- November 6, 1872, Newton, Kansas: Town Marshal Johnson killed M.J. Fitzpatrick, who in a drunken quarrel, had killed Judge George Halliday. This same man named John Johnson was possibly in Tombstone according to the 1880 Census and may have ridden with Wyatt Earp, indicating "Turkey Creek" Jack Johnson and John Johnson, the marshal, are likely one and the same.
- Johnson supposedly spent some time in Deadwood in the Dakota Territory in 1876. He is said to have participated in a gunfight in 1876, where he calmly and slowly used two pistol shots to kill two men at a distance of 30 yards after allegations of cheating were charged following a game of poker. They were both trying to kill him with multiple pistol shots; their mistake was trying to use a "quick draw" while moving towards Johnson. Their spray of shots went wild. Johnson simply turned sideways to make himself a smaller target, raised his opposite arm to use as a gun rest and took a bead on each man, killing them with one shot apiece. Whether this actually occurred is debatable, but town historians and modern-day event enactors stated publicly in August, 2013, that not one, but two separate stories were published about this gunfight in the Deadwood town newspaper in the days following the event.

== Riding with cowboys ==
Johnson is believed to have later spent time in Dodge City, Kansas. Little is known about exactly when he met Wyatt Earp. It could have been during Wyatt's buffalo-hunting days, in Deadwood, or during the time that both were in Dodge City. He is believed to have first ventured into Arizona Territory while working in a cattle drive, alongside Sherman McMaster, "Curly Bill" Brocius, and Pony Diehl, in late 1878. Brocius and Diehl had only recently left the "Murphy-Dolan" faction, having both taken part in the Lincoln County War, opposite Billy the Kid and his "Regulators". No evidence shows that Johnson took part in that range war, nor that he knew Brocius or Diehl prior to the cattle drive.

== Riding with the Earp vendetta ==
Writer John H. Flood, in his unpublished 1926 manuscript of Wyatt Earp's biography (for which many details came from Wyatt himself) said that Johnson was an old friend of the Earps' when they came to Tombstone, and this fits with the fact of Johnson's presence on the train to protect Virgil as he left Tombstone for the last time, March 20, 1882.

As a posseman in the Earp posse, which protected Virgil on the train, Johnson (as "John Johnson") was co-indicted in absentia with Doc Holliday, Wyatt Earp, Warren Earp, and Sherman McMaster in the killing of Frank Stilwell in Tucson, March 20, 1882. Johnson returned with the others to Tombstone on a freight train that night, and the next day (now joined by Texas Jack Vermillion), rode out in the Earp vendetta ride of 1882, by which time he was a wanted man in the territory for the killing of Stilwell.

== Death ==
After the Earp vendetta ride, Johnson escaped through Colorado, then Texas. According to the Flood manuscript, Johnson died of tuberculosis in Salt Lake City, Utah Territory, in 1887, survived there by a widow.

The Flood manuscript biography states that Johnson was a member of the Mount Moriah Lodge No. 2, F. & AM masonic in Salt Lake City, and estimated that his age at death was about 35 (this last information has been used to estimate the birthdate given abov, but it is heavily suspect, as Flood's information on the death age of Vermillion is very erroneous).

== In popular culture ==
Johnson was played by:

- Lonny Chapman in Hour of the Gun starring James Garner and Jason Robards.
- Buck Taylor as a minor character in the movie Tombstone, starring Kurt Russell and Val Kilmer.
- Rusty Hendrickson as a background character during the vendetta ride scenes in Wyatt Earp (film) starring Kevin Costner, Dennis Quaid, and Bill Pullman.
