= Charles Smith (cowboy) =

Arizona Territory figure (1844–1907)

Charles "Charlie" Smith
- Born: Origen Charles Smith; 4 May 1844; Litchfield, Connecticut
- Died: 28 November 1907 (aged 63); Maricopa, Arizona
- Other names: "Hairlip/Harelip [Charlie]"; "Charley"; O.C. Smith
- Spouse: Margaret Winders (1890–93)

Origen Charles "Hairlip Charlie" Smith (4 May 1844 – 28 November 1907) was a lawman, miner and cowboy in Arizona Territory who rode in the Earp Vendetta Ride.

== Early life ==
Origen Charles Smith was born, according to his eulogy and other biographies, in Litchfield, Connecticut, to Charles and Susan Smith, and had a younger brother, Walter Edwin. Walter's birth may have resulted in health complications, and then the death one month later, of Susan. Origen Charles was born with a cleft palate, which gave him his nickname, "Hairlip Charlie" in later life. He was named "Origen" after an early Catholic priest. There is confusion over his birth date and place, though, as in various census reports he claims other dates throughout the 1840s, and a birthplace of Illinois. He is sometimes reported as being born in 1849 or 1850. As a boy, he had been a good runner, and used this talent later to outrun muggers in Tombstone.

== Cowboy life ==
Smith became a frontiersman and at some point moved to Texas, where he was a lawman, but also a gambler, and became injured. Working in saloons in Texas, and at one point co-owner of the Cattle Exchange Saloon, he learned Spanish and was fluent in it before leaving the state. He also frequently got in fights, but is reported to have bad aim and not killed anyone. It was from here that he moved into Arizona Territory in a two-month journey that started on 12 March 1879, a few months before the Earps, whom he had befriended in Fort Worth, followed. His move, like theirs, was due to the reform movement growing in Texas.

When he moved to Tombstone, Smith lived with Bob Winders. When Wyatt Earp arrived, he sponsored many of Smith's mining claims. Equally, on many occasions between 1879 and 1881 Smith supported, both physically and financially, the Earps and their mutual acquaintances, to the point of being targeted by outlaws himself.

Smith, with Fred J. Dodge, joined the Earps chasing some stagecoach thieves in January 1882. He was deputised to protect the Earp family, and joined them in the Vendetta Ride. The Epitaph reported that he was the seventh member to ride out of Tombstone, but eyewitnesses suggest he rode ahead of the posse, as he had done before and would later, to set up a camp and carry supplies, this one eight miles north. He had also been among the deputies to accompany Morgan Earp's body when it was returned to family in California. After this, he initially sought exile with them in Colorado, but quickly returned to Arizona and began ferrying the Earps money from their holdings in the state. He was ambushed and arrested on occasion doing this. Though at odds with the Tombstone Sheriff he was deputised under, Smith retained his badge, as he did under the next several sheriffs, as well.

Smith was the only Vendetta rider to return to Tombstone, and the only original rider to join Wyatt Earp on the later ride that saw Johnny Ringo killed. He again hunted outlaws with Dodge for many years, and in December 1883 was with him looking for the perpetrators of the Bisbee Massacre when he fell ill, due to an old chest wound acquired when shot back in Texas, and couldn't finish the criminal round-up. Also in the 1880s he single-handedly arrested a man for murder. He was also a "key member" of Dodge's crew solving cases of train robbery in Pantano, Arizona in 1887. Smith is reported to have ridden with Dodge, a lawman and undercover operative seeking thieves in Western Arizona, "always [...] when urgent". When Dodge could no longer ride due to arthritis, he named Smith his successor as the nightwatchman and special officer.

Smith had a sometimes friend called Charley Cunningham, the two fought a lot. On November 25, 1885 Smith stepped in to stop a bar fight at the Bank Exchange Saloon. Cunningham, playing faro at the bar, was unhappy and called him a "damned harelip son of a bitch", resulting in Smith shooting Cunningham in the leg. Smith is reported to have not had a gun on him when intervening at the bar, instead taking one from US Marshal Dick Gage to apparently defend himself from an enraged Cunningham; this defense was used, as well as doctor's testimony that Cunningham was not permanently injured, in front of the Cochise Grand Jury in February 1886, with the charges dismissed. Still, on September 22, 1888 Cunningham tried for revenge after the pair were jeered at by a mutual friend called Lazard, with Cunningham chasing Smith for a fight. After a physical fight in the French Wine House, Cunningham took Lazard's pistol and confronted Smith in the street, where he shot Smith in the leg, shattering it near the hip. He became crippled and was believed by Dodge to have died from the effects of this wound, but did not.

When Tombstone fell into decline in the late 1880s, and with his companions moving across the South, Smith moved into other mining prospects in Ramsey Canyon in the nearby Huachuca Mountains. Here he became a Republican councilman for the Ramsey and Miller canyons. When he moved to Tempe a few years later, he continued his work in law enforcement as a deputy, and in politics as Justice of the Peace. He was a Pinal County deputy in Maricopa when he died.

== Personal life ==
Smith lived with friend Bob Winders in Tombstone, started mining ventures with him, and married Winders' widow, Margaret, in 1890, with court records showing him to be the stepfather of Thomas Winders. He presumably became the stepfather to the Winders' other son, and in 1892 had a daughter with Margaret named Oneida. The marriage ended and Smith moved to Tempe, leaving the family in Tombstone, where Margaret (and eventually Oneida) took back the Winders name. One Earp-era history suggests that Smith had married a daughter of Winders when they worked together in Texas, though Winders had only two children, both sons.

He was described as "a man of sterling quality, steadfast in his friendships and zealous in his duty".

== Lack of pop culture presence ==
Charles Smith, despite being a close associate of the Earp family, does not often play a part in adaptations of stories of their lives and pursuits. It has been suggested that this is because of his plain name and unappealing sobriquet making him not fit the archetype of a Wild West cowboy. It's also been suggested that he is left out of many stories because there are no known photos of him. He is also amongst the Vendetta riders who were ignored or forgotten until interest was sparked in the real cowboys, with Smith being "rediscovered" in 1997.

== Smith letters ==
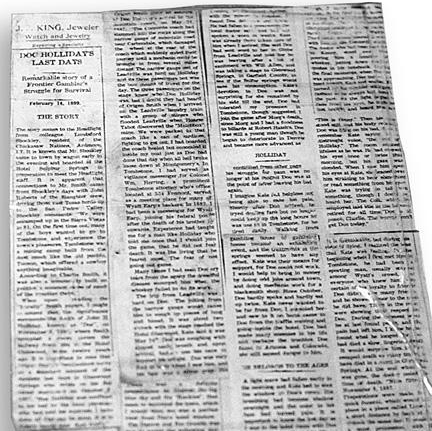
1899 article that published the letters

In 2000, a man called Clifton V. Brewer claimed to have found a collection of documents belonging to Smith in a trunk from his great-great-grandfather, supposedly a friend of Smith's. The find was "dubious" but still widely publicised until an intricate investigation proved it to be false. Some letters were the main documents, and the proof of fakery then cast doubt on related documents, like a newspaper article said to be from Sulphur Headlight which detailed Smith's eyewitness accounts of the last days of Doc Holliday in Glenwood Springs. The letters appeared to say that Smith was compiling memoirs in Tombstone in 1887, which were passed to a friend for help, who then had the Holliday pages published in Sulphur, Oklahoma, on February 14, 1899. The only records were in the possession of this supposed friend and then his descendants. The letters gave a "standard account" of Holliday's illness and death, with more imaginative details of surrounding circumstances and other peoples' emotions.
