= Frank Jackson (outlaw) =

19th-century American outlaw

Frank Jackson was an American outlaw.

== Biography ==
Born in Llano County, Texas, Frank Jackson was orphaned at a young age. By 1874, Jackson was working as a tinner for Jim Murphy in Denton, Texas, when he became acquainted with Sam Bass. Two years later, Jackson killed horse thief Henry Goodall. The following year, Jackson reluctantly joined Bass and his gang in a number of bank robberies, including the hold-up of a stagecoach near Fort Worth on December 22 and again on January 28, 1878. Within several weeks, Jackson and the others began robbing trains, the Houston & Texas Central Express near Allen, Texas on February 22, and near Hutchins, Texas on March 18. Over the course of the next year, Jackson became a close associate of Bass, and at one point, was able to intervene on behalf of another gang member, Jim Murphy, who was suspected of being an informant, thus saving Murphy's life.

Leaving Denton, Texas in the following July, Jackson and the others camped outside Round Rock, Texas for several days, preparing to rob a bank. One of the gang members, Jim Murphy, warned the authorities of the planned robbery, and police began heavy surveillance of the area. On July 19, Jackson and the others rode into town to take a look at the bank one last time. Murphy slipped away, making an excuse of buying corn for the horses. Meanwhile, Jackson continued on with Seaborn Barnes and Bass to buy some tobacco at the Koppel general store.

While in the store, the three were approached by deputy sheriff Ellis Grimes and Morris Moore. When Grimes put his hand on Barnes and asked if he was armed, the outlaws panicked, turning around and gunning both men down. Forced to fight their way through Texas Rangers and local residents, they managed to get to their horses, but not before Seaborn Barnes had been killed by Texas Ranger Dick Ware, and Bass had been shot several times by Texas Ranger George Harrell. Bass managed to ride only a hundred yards before falling from his horse. Jackson went back to rescue him. Though they escaped their pursuers as night approached, Bass was unable to ride further, so Jackson bandaged Bass's wounds and left him under a tree outside of town. Bass was picked up by a posse the next morning but refused to reveal any information about Jackson, and he died the next day.

According to Murphy in a letter to Texas Ranger John B. Jones, he was contacted by Jackson soon after the incident at Round Rock. He asked to surrender himself, earning a reprieve in exchange for hunting down former gang member and wanted outlaw Henry Underwood. However, Murphy apparently lost contact with Jackson, and the deal never went any further. Although Jackson was reportedly seen in Denton County for a brief time, claims of his whereabouts placed him in various places including Texas, New Mexico, California, and according to Sheriff Charlie Siringo, as far away as Montana.

An extensive search for Jackson was made. According to a Canadian newspaper in Winnipeg, Manitoba, two Texas officers were searching the area "for the renowned bandits, Jackson and Underwood during the summer of 1879. Other reports placed him in other parts of Canada and Brazil.

Subsequently, his whereabouts and activities after this time are unrecorded ("vanished from the face of the Earth"), as Jack Davis was alleged to have done. As late as the 1960s, New York-based "Wild West" magazines claimed that the Texas Rangers "continue to maintain an open file on the Sam Bass gang - Jackson has never been caught". During the 1980s, these same magazines incorrectly claimed that Jackson's file was still open in the Texas Department of Public Safety; however, this file was officially closed by Texas Ranger Captain Frank Hamer.

Around 1920, the Texas Rangers began receiving tentative contacts including writer Eugene Manlove Rhodes on behalf of "an old bandit" who "wanted to get square with the law" during his last years. Interviewed by Hamer, the man was reportedly a highly successful rancher and businessman living in New Mexico. By this time, Jackson was considered a folk hero by Texans for his rescue of Sam Bass, and while urged by Texas law enforcement officials to clear his name, he refused to return to Texas. As late as 1927 however, attempts had been made to convince authorities in Williamson County to drop the criminal charges against him for the murders of the two deputy sheriffs in Round Rock.

== Sources ==
- Eckhardt, C.F. Tales of Badmen, Bad Women, and Bad Places: Four Centuries of Texas Outlawry. Lubbock: Texas Tech University Press, 1999. ISBN 0-89672-420-4
- Neal, Bill. Encyclopedia of Western Gunfighters. Norman: University of Oklahoma Press, 1991. ISBN 0-8061-2335-4
- Thrapp, Dan L. Encyclopedia of Frontier Biography: In Three Volumes, Volume III (P-Z). Lincoln: University of Nebraska Press, 1988. ISBN 0-8032-9418-2
