= Texas Jack Vermillion =

Union Army soldier, posse member of Earp Vendetta Ride

John Wilson Vermillion
- Born: c. 1842; Culpeper County, Virginia, U.S.
- Died: 1911 (aged 68–69); Washington County, Virginia, U.S.
- Occupations: Soldier, lawman, outlaw, Methodist preacher
- Known for: American Civil War; Arizona War; *Gunfight at Iron Springs
- Spouse(s): Margaret Horton, Nannie Fleenor
- Children: 2

John Wilson Vermillion (c. 1842–1911), also known as "Texas Jack" or later as "Shoot-Your-Eye-Out Vermillion", was a gunfighter of the Old West known for his participation in the Earp Vendetta Ride and his later association with Soapy Smith.

== Early life ==
Vermillion was born in about 1842 in Culpeper County, Virginia. He fought for the Confederacy during the civil war, serving in the 2nd Tennessee Cavalry.

== Out West ==
Vermillion wound up in Kansas in the late 1870s. From Dodge City, Kansas, he went to Tombstone, Arizona (Arizona Territory), where he possibly previously knew the Earps and Doc Holliday. He was listed by Virgil Earp as special policeman (i.e., deputy city policeman) June 22, 1881. This is the day of the large Tombstone fire of 1881, with which Virgil had to cope as acting city marshal; the date suggests that Vermillion was one of the extra men Virgil hired to help cope with looting, during and after the disaster.

=== Nickname ===
The origin of Texas Jack, Vermillion's nickname, is unknown, but he is first listed by this moniker on a wanted poster, for shooting a man during an argument at cards. When asked about why he was called Texas Jack, he replied: "Because I'm from Virginia".

=== Earp Vendetta Ride ===
Vermillion did not accompany Virgil Earp as a member of the protective squad which escorted him to Tucson, on March 20, 1882. Instead, Vermillion joined the vendetta posse March 21, 1882 in Tombstone, a day after the killing of Frank Stilwell in Tucson; thus Vermillion was not one of the five men indicted for Stilwell's killing. He presumably did participate in the killing of Florentino Cruz on March 22.

Vermillion had his horse shot out from under him during the fight at Iron Springs (March 24), in which "Curly Bill" Brocius was killed. Vermillion was himself not hit in that fight, but he had to be picked up by Doc Holliday after exposing himself to fire from the cowboys, while trying to retrieve the rifle wedged under his fallen horse. This episode, combined with Wyatt's memory in the Flood manuscript and Vermillion's family history suggest that Vermillion may have participated in the Earp posse more as a friend of Holliday's, who was a fellow Methodist and fellow southerner. Note that Holliday's father had also served as a Confederate soldier.

In the unpublished 1926 John H. Flood manuscript of Wyatt Earp's biography, Vermillion is mentioned (as "Texas Jack") several times as not being a close friend of the Earps', but rather a relative stranger. This fact caused Wyatt some chagrin in memory, since Vermillion stayed by him at Iron Springs when the other three men in his posse at the time (Holliday, Johnson, and McMasters) fled under fire. (Warren Earp was away on an errand for the posse.).

== Later life ==
Sometime around 1890, Vermillion returned permanently to Virginia, settled near the town of Big Stone Gap, and worked as a Methodist preacher. He and his second wife, Nannie Fleenor (whom he wed in 1883), had a son, Opie Vermillion, and a daughter, Minnie Bell Vermillion.

== Death ==
John Wilson Vermillion Photos 1861 and 1910

Vermillion is said in many sources (including Earp's biography by Flood, which is probably the primary source for the information) to have drowned in Lake Michigan near Chicago, about 1900. Young states that Vermillion's body was returned to Virginia for burial, but Flood does not say this, and Young does not cite his source. Young may have assumed the body was returned, since there is evidence that Vermillion is buried in Virginia (see below).

In contrast to the ca. 1900 drowning theory, Vermillion family records suggest that Jack Vermillion died peacefully in his sleep in 1911. A photograph of him and his second wife ca. 1910 survives in the family record. A John W. Vermillion (farmer) is also listed in the 1910 census in Washington Co., Virginia (this is just South of Russell County and the town of Big Stone Gap). This man, listed as aged 66, is listed as being born in Virginia, married in Virginia, 35 years(?) to wife Nannie. Whether or not this is the same man is not definitely known. The implied birth date would be wrong, but reasonably close (circa 1844, not 1842); however, the given marriage date would be far off (35 years from 1910 is 1875, not 1883). The place of residence is in the same relatively small area in the western tail of Virginia where Vermillion was born and is said in other sources to have returned. The issue is not resolved. Visually, the elderly man in the 1910 photograph could well be the young J.W. Vermillion from the Civil War photo (see comparison photo).

According to Vermillion family history, Jack killed a man in a gunfight in 1890 and was forced to move 60 miles east to Mendota, Virginia, in Washington County (which fits with the census report), where he spent the rest of his days. John W. Vermillion's grave and that of his wife are in the Mendota Cemetery.

== Portrayals in the media ==
Vermillion appears as a minor character in most Wyatt Earp films. For example, he is portrayed in Hour of the Gun (1967) by actor William Windom, in Tombstone (1993) by actor Peter Sherayko and (in a cameo appearance) in Wyatt Earp by Adam Taylor.
