= Sherman McMaster =

American Old West outlaw and lawman (1853–1892)

Sherman W. McMaster
- Born: 1853; Rock Island, Illinois, U.S.
- Died: 1892 (aged 38–39); Colorado, U.S.
- Occupation: Texas Ranger

Sherman McMaster (1853–1892) was an outlaw turned lawman, who was one of the six men involved in the Earp vendetta ride.

== Early life ==
Sherman W. McMaster was born in 1853 in Rock Island, Illinois, the son of Sylvester W. McMaster. Not much is known of his life before heading out west, but he moved to Texas and became a Texas Ranger. He met "Curly Bill" Brocius, who was a prisoner under McMaster's Ranger division. In 1878 Curly Bill escaped from prison, allegedly helped by McMaster. Soon after, along with Brocius, Johnny Barnes, and Pony Diehl, McMaster moved to Arkansas.

== Life as an outlaw and gunfighter ==
McMaster worked for the Texas Rangers in 1878, the same year that he first met Brocius. By most accounts he was a good lawman and was respected for his talents with a gun. In July 1880 he was suspected of stealing U.S. Army mules and two horses from a camp near Tombstone. He was also a suspect in a stagecoach robbery near Globe, Arizona.

On February 24, 1881, two men robbed the stage traveling between Globe and Florence. When they found that the Wells, Fargo & Co. strongbox was empty, they stole the U.S. mail. Pony Diehl (aka Charles Ray) and McMaster were suspects. In Tombstone, City Marshal Virgil Earp knew that McMaster was wanted for the robbery, but according to The Tombstone Epitaph Virgil had received instructions from Pima County Sheriff Bob Paul to wait to arrest McMaster until Diehl was in custody.

On September 10, 1881, Tombstone City Marshal Virgil Earp attempted to arrest McMaster, who resisted. McMaster fired several shots at Virgil before escaping.

Some accounts have since indicated he was possibly working undercover for the Rangers to break up the outlaw Cowboys. By the time the clash between the Earps and the Cowboys came about, McMaster's allegiance was with the Earps.

He played an important role in the vendetta. Once a member of the Cowboys (an outlaw gang), he later changed his views and sided with the Earps. He had, by all accounts, previously met and become friends with Wyatt Earp and Doc Holliday in Dodge City, Kansas. He assisted Wyatt Earp in taking his revenge on the outlaw gang for the death of Wyatt's brother, Morgan Earp and the shooting of his other brother Virgil Earp, all following the Gunfight at the O.K. Corral. Among the other participants in the Vendetta were Wyatt and his younger brother Warren Earp, Doc Holliday, "Turkey Creek" Jack Johnson, and Texas Jack Vermillion.

== Death ==
In a letter written to his father, Will McLaury wrote that McMaster had been killed by the Cowboys. Wyatt Earp claimed in the Flood manuscript that McMaster had been killed in 1898 in the Philippines while serving as a soldier in the Spanish–American War. However, official records do not list him as a soldier. A probate record filed by his siblings in 1906 listed his death in Colorado in 1892.

== In popular culture ==
McMaster has been portrayed in almost every film about the Earps. He was played by Monte Markham in 1967's Hour of the Gun, Markham’s feature-length movie debut, in which the character is the sheriff of a neighboring county recruited by Wyatt Earp into the posse (historically inaccurate); by Todd Allen in Wyatt Earp (1994), where he is a Tombstone deputy marshal working for Wyatt and Virgil; and by Michael Rooker in the 1993 film Tombstone, where he is a member of the Cowboys who joins Earp's posse after quitting the gang in disgust. Rooker's character is killed by the Cowboys during the Vendetta, though that is also historically inaccurate. In all three films, he is called "McMasters".
