= Frank Stilwell =

American outlaw (1856–1882)

- Born: 1856; Iowa City, Iowa, United States
- Died: March 20, 1882 (aged 25–26); Tucson, Arizona Territory, United States
- Cause of death: Gunshot wounds
- Occupations: Cochise County Deputy Sheriff; livery owner; miner; outlaw
- Years active: 1877–1882
- Opponents: Wyatt Earp; Virgil Earp; Morgan Earp; Doc Holliday
- Parent(s): William "Henry" Stilwell and Charlotte B. "Sarah" Winfrey

Frank C. Stilwell (1856 – March 20, 1882) was an outlaw Cowboy who killed at least two men in Cochise County during 1877–82. Both killings were considered to have been self-defense. For four months he was a deputy sheriff in Tombstone, Arizona Territory for Cochise County Sheriff Johnny Behan. Stilwell owned interests in several mines and various businesses, including a saloon, a wholesale liquor business, a stage line, and at his death livery stables in Charleston and Bisbee. He was also a partner in a Bisbee-area saloon with ex-Texas Ranger Pete Spence.

He was closely involved in the events leading up to and following the Gunfight at the O.K. Corral on October 26, 1881, and was suspected in the murder of Morgan Earp on March 18, 1882. Two days after Morgan's death, Frank Stilwell was killed by Deputy U.S. Marshal Wyatt Earp in a Tucson train yard. Arrest warrants were issued for Earp and four others in his gang suspected of murdering Stilwell. Murder indictments were issued at Pima County for Wyatt Earp, Doc Holliday, Warren Earp, Sherman McMaster and John Johnson. Earp agreed to turn himself in but instead fled the Arizona Territory for Colorado. Wyatt Earp admitted late in his life to killing Stilwell at close range with a shotgun.

== Early life ==
Frank was the son of William "Henry" Stilwell and Charlotte B. "Sarah" Winfrey. Frank was born in Iowa in 1856 (as estimated from his self-reported age of 24 in the 1880 census).

His family moved shortly afterward near Palmyra, Kansas Territory, on the Santa Fe Trail. In 1863 William and Charlotte divorced and William left with the three boys, Jack, Millard and Frank. Charlotte took the girls Elizabeth and Mary. Frank's father was a Private in the Union Army with Company B, 18th Missouri Volunteer Infantry, under General William Tecumseh Sherman and took part in Sherman's March to the Sea.

His older brother Simpson "Comanche Jack" Stilwell was an Indian fighter, scout, Deputy U.S. Marshal, police judge, and U.S. Commissioner.

== Arrival in Arizona ==
Frank and his brother Simpson traveled from Anadarko, Indian Territory to Prescott, Arizona Territory in 1877.

=== Acquitted for two murders ===
While in Prescott, Frank worked at nearby Miller's Ranch. On October 18, 1877, newly hired cook Jesus Bega brought Frank tea instead of coffee, and after an argument Frank shot Bega through the lung, killing him. Frank was later acquitted on the grounds of self-defense. When Frank's brother Simpson left Arizona for Fort Davis, Texas Frank remained in Arizona. He worked as a teamster for C. H. "Ham" Light.

Frank later staked a claim and worked a mine in Pima County and on November 9, 1879, got into an argument over claim-jumping with Col. John Van Houten. Van Houten was brutally beaten in the face with a rock and died. Frank Stilwell and James Cassidy were charged with his murder but escaped a grand jury indictment for lack of evidence.

In the 1880 census he listed himself as 24 years old, and living in Charleston, occupation "keeping livery," and reported that he had been born in Texas.

=== Named deputy sheriff ===
Stilwell was hired as an assistant deputy sheriff by Cochise County Sheriff Johnny Behan in April, 1881. Four months later, in August, Behan fired him for "accounting irregularities".

=== Arrested and acquitted for robbery ===
On September 8, 1881, a passenger stage on the 'Sandy Bob Line' in the Tombstone area bound for Bisbee, Arizona was robbed. The masked bandits robbed all of the passengers of their valuables and the strongbox of about $2,500. During the robbery, the driver heard one of the robbers describe the money as "sugar", a phrase known to be used by Frank. Wyatt and Virgil Earp rode with the sheriff's posse attempting to track the robbers. At the scene of the holdup, Wells, Fargo & Co. undercover agent Fred Dodge discovered an unusual boot print left by someone wearing a custom-repaired boot heel. The Earps checked a shoe repair shop in Bisbee known to provide widened boot heels and were able to link the boot print to Frank Stilwell.

When Stilwell arrived in Bisbee with his livery stable partner, Pete Spence, Tombstone Marshal Virgil Earp, Special Police Officer Wyatt Earp, and Cochise County Deputy Sheriff Billy Breakenridge arrested them for the robbery. Stilwell and Spence were arraigned before Judge Wells Spicer and posted $7,000 bond, paid by C.H. "Ham" Light. At the preliminary hearing, Stilwell and Spence were able to provide several witnesses who supported their alibis. The distinctive boot print and the use of the word "sugar" to describe money was not enough to convict Stilwell, and Judge Spicer dropped the charges for insufficient evidence just as he had done for Doc Holliday earlier in the year.

On October 13, two weeks after Frank was acquitted on the state charges, Virgil in his role as Deputy U.S. Marshal filed new federal charges against Stilwell and Spence for the federal crime of interfering with a mail carrier. Virgil took Stilwell and Spence to Tucson for arraignment where they were held at the territorial jail. While Virgil was in Tucson, he deputized Wyatt to act in his place as assistant city marshal in Tombstone.

The Cowboys thought the new arrest was in regard to a separate stage robbery that had occurred five days before October 8 near Contention City, and saw the new arrest as evidence that Stilwell and Spence were being unfairly harassed and targeted by the Earps for any stage robbery. They let the Earps know they could expect retaliation.

While Wyatt and Virgil were in Tucson for the federal hearing on the charges against Stilwell and Spence, Cowboy Frank McLaury confronted Morgan Earp, Spence and Stilwell being friends of McLaury and his brother Tom. He told Morgan that the McLaurys would kill the Earps if they tried to arrest Spence, Stilwell, or the McLaurys again. The Tombstone Epitaph reported "that since the arrest of Spence and Stilwell, veiled threats [are] being made that the friends of the accused will 'get the Earps.'" The newspapers misreported that Stilwell and Spence had been arrested for the different recent October 8 stage robbery near Contention City, probably helping to lead to the mistaken conviction that Stilwell and Spence were being persecuted by the law.

=== Murder of Morgan Earp ===
The day after Morgan Earp's assassination, Coroner Dr. H. M. Mathews held an inquest in which Pete Spence's wife, Marietta Duarte, stated that her husband and Frank Stilwell, Indian Charlie, Frederick Bode and an unnamed "half-breed" had returned home only one hour after the shooting, and that her husband had threatened her with violence if she told what she knew. Witnesses said they saw former Cochise County Sheriff's Deputy Frank Stilwell running from the scene. The Coroner's jury concluded that Spence, Stilwell, Frederick Bode, a man named Fries, and Florentino "Indian Charlie" were suspected in Morgan Earp's assassination. Spence immediately turned himself in so that he would be protected in Behan's jail.

== Stilwell's death in Tucson ==
On March 20, Deputy U.S. Marshal Wyatt Earp received information that Frank Stilwell, Ike Clanton, Hank Swilling, and another cowboy were watching the passenger trains in Tucson intending to kill Virgil Earp. Wyatt and his assistant deputies Warren Earp, Doc Holliday, "Turkey Creek" Jack Johnson, and Sherman McMaster accompanied Virgil and Allie to the rail head in Benson. Fearing another attack, they decided to stay with Virgil and his wife aboard the train to Tucson, armed with pistols, rifles and shotguns. McMaster wore two belts of cartridges. Virgil said later that he had Allie wear his pistol belt where he could easily have access to the weapon if he should need it. Virgil and Allie were scheduled to catch a train in Tucson for Colton, California, where the Earps’ parents lived.

Upon their arrival in Tucson, the Earp posse spotted Stilwell and other Cowboys. "Almost the first men we met on the platform there were Stilwell and his friends, armed to the teeth", Virgil later told the San Francisco Examiner. "They fell back into the crowd as soon as they saw I had an escort, and the boys took me to the hotel to supper." Watched over by the well-armed Wyatt and his posse, Virgil and Allie had dinner in Tucson at Porter's Hotel, then reboarded the train. As the train pulled away from the station, gunfire was heard. Witnesses said they saw men running with weapons but could not identify anyone. Wyatt later told his biographers that he saw Frank Stilwell, and another man he believed to be Ike Clanton, armed with shotguns lying on a flatcar. When Wyatt and his men approached, the two men ran. Stilwell stumbled, allowing Wyatt to catch him. In a story published on May 14, 1893, Wyatt told a reporter for the Denver Republican he shot Stilwell as he attempted to push the barrel of Earp's shotgun away.

I ran straight for Stilwell. It was he who killed my brother. What a coward he was! He couldn't shoot when I came near him. He stood there helpless and trembling for his life. As I rushed upon him he put out his hands and clutched at my shotgun. I let go both barrels, and he tumbled down dead and mangled at my feet.

Ike Clanton escaped. Afterward, he gave interviews to the newspapers in which he claimed that he and Stilwell had been in Tucson to respond to federal charges of interfering with a U.S. mail carrier, stemming from Stilwell's alleged participation in robbing the Bisbee stage on September 8, 1881. According to Ike, Stilwell disappeared from the hotel before he was found shot dead by the tracks several blocks away. Ike said they heard that the Earps were coming via train and had plans to kill Stilwell. Other accounts reported that Clanton and Stilwell went to the train depot to meet a witness named McDowell who was to appear before the grand jury. Only upon their arrival at the depot did they learn the Earps were in Tucson.

Stilwell's body was found the next day alongside the tracks riddled with two rounds of buckshot, one in his leg and the other in his chest marked with powder burns, along with four other bullet wounds. His own pistol had not been fired. George Hand, who saw the body, said Stilwell was "the worst shot up man I ever saw."

=== Earp's story ===
In a 1926 interview with biographer John H. Flood, Wyatt said that they spotted Stilwell and Clanton armed on a flatcar in the train yard, apparently waiting to ambush the Earps. Both men ran after being confronted by the armed Earp party. Stilwell dropped his weapon and stumbled as he ran in the dark train yard, and Wyatt caught up to him and killed him with a point-blank shotgun blast under the ribs as Stilwell tried to fend off Earp's weapon. Wyatt reported that Stilwell's last words were "Morg! Morg!", probably referring to Morgan Earp. Wyatt credited himself as the one who fatally shot Stilwell with a shotgun, although Holliday may have likely killed him as he was the only one documented to have carried a shotgun at that time.

In a March 1882 interview with the Arizona Daily Star, Virgil Earp told the reporter "Before Stilwell died he confessed that he killed Morg and gave the names of those who were implicated with him. When my brothers were leaving Arizona they got dispatches from Tucson saying that Stilwell and a party of friends were watching all the railroad trains passing that way, and they were going through them in search of all Earps and their friends, carrying shotguns under their overcoats and promising to kill on sight. Our boys were bound to look out for themselves, and when they got near Tucson were very cautious. They found Stilwell near the track and killed him."

Frank's brother "Comanche Jack" Stilwell soon heard of his brother's death and went west with hopes of avenging him, but he never reached Tombstone and soon went back without doing so.

=== Coroner's jury investigation ===
J.W. Evans witnessed Doc Holliday getting off the train with two shotguns and walk towards the railroad station office and then return without them. He talked to Wyatt Earp at the Porter Hotel near the station and shook hands with Virgil when he arrived. He testified at the inquest that the Earps were not armed, but that he had seen Stilwell, and thought he saw a bulge under his coat that indicated a pistol. He also said he saw Ike Clanton at the depot. Witness David Gibson also saw the Earps and Doc Holliday at the station. He said that when they walked from Porter Hotel to the station, they appeared to be looking for someone. He said Holliday was carrying a pistol holster over his shoulder and the two Earps were each carrying a short messenger shotgun. He watched the Earps get on the train and one of them inspected the far side of the train, looking up and down the tracks. They first walked towards the rear of the train and then towards the front.

Alman J. Hinckley witnessed the shooting from a distance. He saw gun flashes and six to ten men standing on the south side of the track at 7:30 p.m. near where Stilwell's body was later found. He did not see where the men went afterward.

=== Shot by five weapons ===
Dr. Dexter Lloyd examined Stilwell's body and found a bullet wound that passed through his entire body from the armpit through the upper portion of his lungs and out the other armpit. A second rifle bullet wound had passed through his upper left arm. One round of buckshot left six holes within a radius of 3 inches (76 mm), and penetrated his liver, stomach, and abdomen, leaving powder burns on his coat. A second round of buckshot had hit his left leg, breaking the bone, and a rifle shot had struck the fleshy portion of his right leg. Either the shot through the lungs or the buckshot in the abdomen was sufficient to kill him. The coroner reported that Stilwell had been shot by five different weapons.

=== Earp prosecution sought ===
The Tucson court issued arrest warrants for Wyatt Earp, Warren Earp, Doc Holliday, Jack Johnson, and Sherman McMaster. On May 16, 1882, the sheriff of Arapahoe County, Colorado notified Cochise County Sheriff Johnny Behan that he had Wyatt and Warren Earp in his custody, along with Doc Holliday. Behan applied to the governor for money to go to Colorado to bring the Earps back, but Governor Fremont instead gave the funds to Pima County Sheriff Bob Paul. Paul had received word on the same day from Denver that the sheriff there had five of the Earp party in custody. When Paul arrived in Denver, he served a warrant for Doc Holliday's arrest on charges that he killed Frank Stilwell in Tucson. Wyatt Earp, also in Denver, feared for Holliday's life if he was returned to Tombstone. He asked his friend in Trinidad, Colorado, Sheriff Bat Masterson, to help get Holliday released. Sheriff Masterson appealed to Governor Frederick W. Pitkin and succeeded in getting Holliday released from jail. Paul knew of warrants for the Earps' arrest, but he was a friend of the men and never served the warrants.

=== Burial ===
The Tucson Weekly Citizen reported on March 28, 1882, that Stilwell "was buried this afternoon, the coffin being conveyed to the grave in an express wagon, unfollowed by a single mourner." Stilwell was originally buried in the old Tucson City cemetery, but when the cemetery was moved, most of the residents were reburied in a mass grave in the Evergreen Cemetery in Tucson.

== In popular culture ==
=== Memorial statue ===
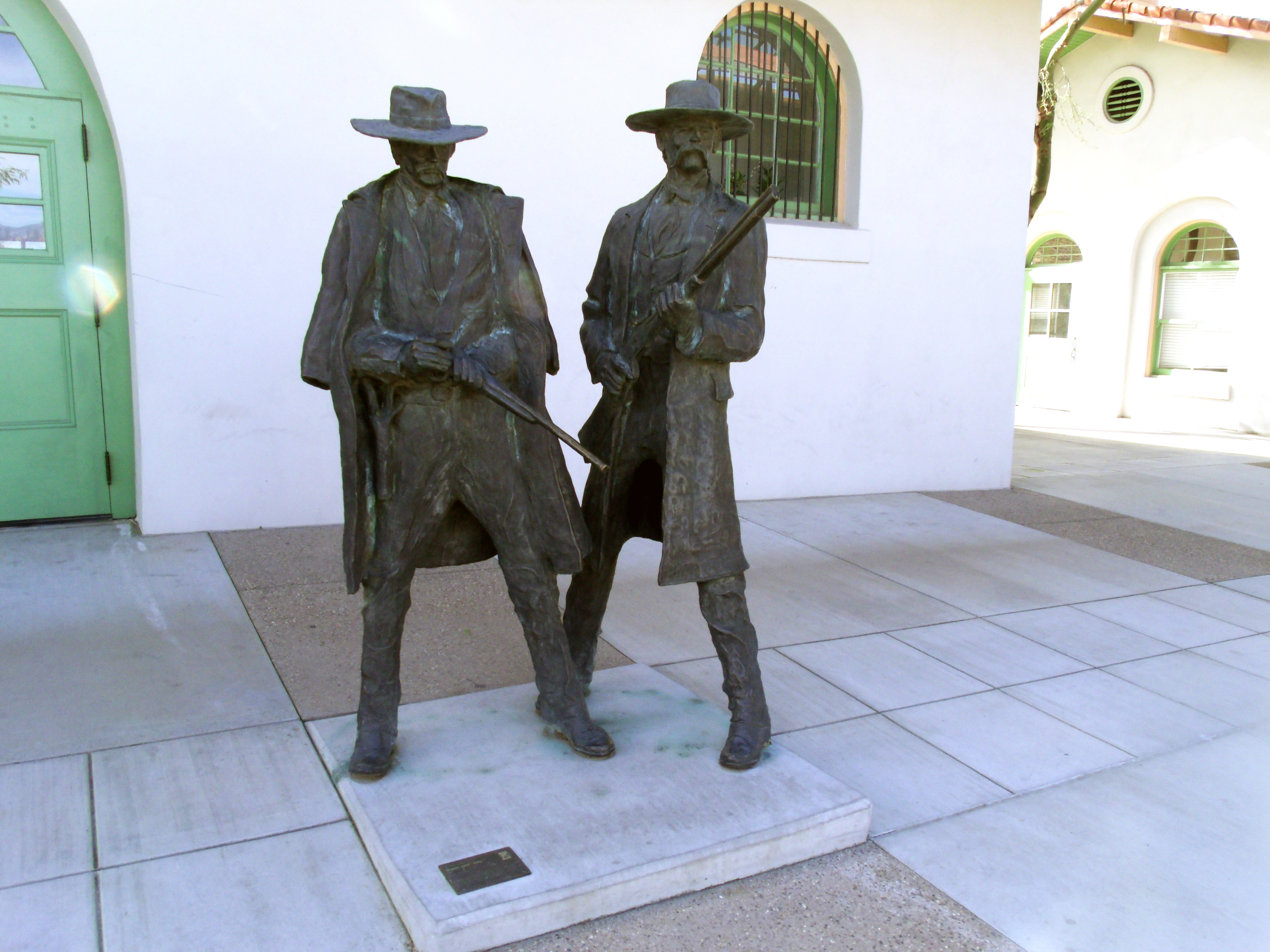
This is the location of the 1880s Tucson Depot. It was in this location where Frank Stilwell, suspected in the murder of Morgan Earp on March 18, 1882, was killed by Wyatt Earp in the company of Doc Holliday. The location is now part of the Amtrak Station which is located at 400 N. Toole Ave. in Tucson, AZ.

Life-sized statues of both Wyatt Earp and Doc Holliday stand at the approximate site of where Stilwell was encountered by Wyatt Earp and his posse, at the former Tucson Southern Pacific Depot, and began their pursuit of Stilwell. The buildings that are there now are not the ones that were at the station in 1882, and the building that is there where the statues are placed at is the former Railway Express building, but in 1882, it is where the Porter Hotel (later renamed San Xavier Hotel) building was. The hotel was destroyed in a fire just after the turn of the century, and the original depot itself was demolished shortly after the completion of the current depot and its buildings in 1907. The Southern Arizona Transportation Museum conducts tours of the site and the rest of the Historic Depot upon request.

=== Media portrayals ===
Stillwell was portrayed by John Baxter in Season 5 of the Television Show The Life and Legend of Wyatt Earp starring Hugh O'Brien as Earp. The death of Stilwell is prominently featured in the 1993 film Tombstone, in which he was played by Tomas Arana. Stilwell was then portrayed by John Dennis Johnston in the 1994 film Wyatt Earp.

== See also ==
- Brunckow's Cabin
