= Warren Earp =

American lawman (1855–1900)

Warren Baxter Earp
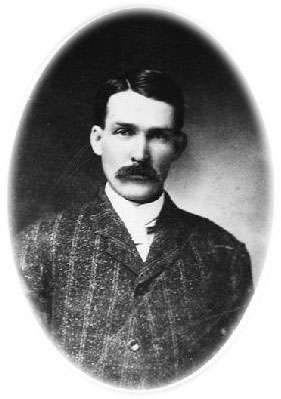
- Warren Baxter Earp
- Born: March 9, 1855; Pella, Iowa, U.S.
- Died: July 6, 1900 (aged 45); Willcox, Arizona Territory, U.S.
- Cause of death: Gunshot wound
- Resting place: Pioneer Cemetery, Willcox, Arizona
- Occupations: Lawman, stagecoach driver
- Years active: 1878–1900
- Opponents: Frank Stilwell; Johnnie Boyett
- Parent(s): Nicholas Porter Earp and his second wife, Virginia Ann Cooksey
- Relatives: Newton, Mariah Ann, James, Virgil, Martha, Wyatt, Morgan, Warren, Virginia Ann, and Douglas Earp

Warren Baxter Earp (March 9, 1855 – July 6, 1900) was an American frontiersman and lawman. He was the youngest of Earp brothers, Wyatt, Morgan, Virgil, James, and Newton Earp. Although he was not present during the Gunfight at the O.K. Corral, after Virgil was maimed in an ambush, Warren joined Wyatt and was in town when Morgan was assassinated. He also helped Wyatt in the hunt for the outlaws they believed responsible. Later in life, Warren developed a reputation as a bully and was killed in an argument in 1900.

== Early life ==
Warren was born in Pella, Iowa. Little is known about his early life. Like Wyatt and Morgan, he was too young to take part in the American Civil War, as his older brothers James, Virgil, and Newton did. He was eighteen years younger than Newton. He joined his brothers in Tombstone, Arizona in 1880, and worked occasionally as a deputy for Virgil collecting taxes and for periodic guard duty. Wyatt landed the Faro concession at the Oriental Saloon. Virgil was the deputy marshal and in mid-1881 became the Tombstone city marshal as well. James was his deputy. The Earps had ongoing conflicts with a loose federation of outlaws known as The Cowboys, who were implicated in ongoing livestock thefts and had repeatedly threatened to kill the Earps if they interfered.

== Earp vendetta ==
Warren was at his parents' home in Colton, California at the time of the Gunfight at the O.K. Corral on October 26, 1881. On December 28, 1881, the Cowboys ambushed Virgil Earp, maiming him. Warren returned to Tombstone and was deputized by Wyatt. On March 18, 1882, Morgan Earp was murdered while playing billiards. On March 20, 1882, he joined a posse guarding Virgil and Allie as they were transported to Tucson to catch a train for California. At the station, Frank Stilwell was spotted lying in wait for Virgil and was killed. On Friday the Tucson Grand Jury returned indictments naming Warren, Wyatt, Doc Holliday, "Turkey Creek" Jack Johnson, and Sherman McMaster. Pima County Justice of the Peace Charles Meyer issued warrants for the arrest of all five men.

After receiving notice of the warrants, Cochise County Sheriff Johnny Behan gathered his deputies and Tombstone City Marshal Dave Neagle. Behan and his men met at the door of the Cosmopolitan Hotel, preparing to arrest the Earp party. They found the Earps exiting the lobby of the Cosmopolitan Hotel, heavily armed, on their way to pick up their horses from Montgomery's Stable. Behan told Deputy U.S. Marshal Earp, "Wyatt, I want to see you." Without stopping, Wyatt replied, "You might see me once too often." Behan or his posse made no attempt to stop the Earp party. They left Tombstone that night and during the next week killed three more Cowboys they believed responsible for attacking their brothers in a vendetta across Cochise County. The men were never tried or convicted.

== Later life and death ==
Following the vendetta ride, Warren left Arizona for a time. He returned in 1891, and worked as a mail stage driver on the route between Willcox and Fort Grant. He may have worked briefly as a range detective for rancher Henry Hooker in Cochise County, Arizona. Modern depictions of Warren Earp portray him as being slightly naive and youthful. After the shootout in Tombstone, he gained a reputation as a bully, playing off the reputation of his older brothers.

His brother Virgil feared that Warren's temper would get him killed. Virgil was reunited in 1898 with his first wife Ellen and daughter Nellie who had been told he had been killed in the Civil War. They visited twice, and Nellie told The Oregonian that during their visit, "My father said then, 'If Warren ever dies he will be shot. He is too hasty, quick-tempered and too ready to pick a quarrel. Besides he will not let bygones be bygones, and on that account, I expect that he will meet a violent death.'"

On July 6, 1900, Warren became involved in an argument with Hooker's range boss, Johnny Boyett, inside Brown's Saloon in Willcox. Boyett and Warren had been involved in verbal disputes before that night, and rumor was that their mutual dislike stemmed from affections for the same woman, possibly a local prostitute. However, the Tombstone Epitaph says that the incident began out of Earp's constant bullying of Boyett.

Later that night, the two men, both drunk, began arguing. Bystanders said they "never heard any man take such abuse." Warren Earp is alleged to have said "Boyett, get your gun and we'll settle this right here. I've got mine, go and get yours". Boyett left and returned shortly thereafter with two .45 caliber Colt handguns. Boyett called out for Earp, who walked in from another doorway. Immediately upon seeing Earp, Boyett fired two rounds, but both missed.

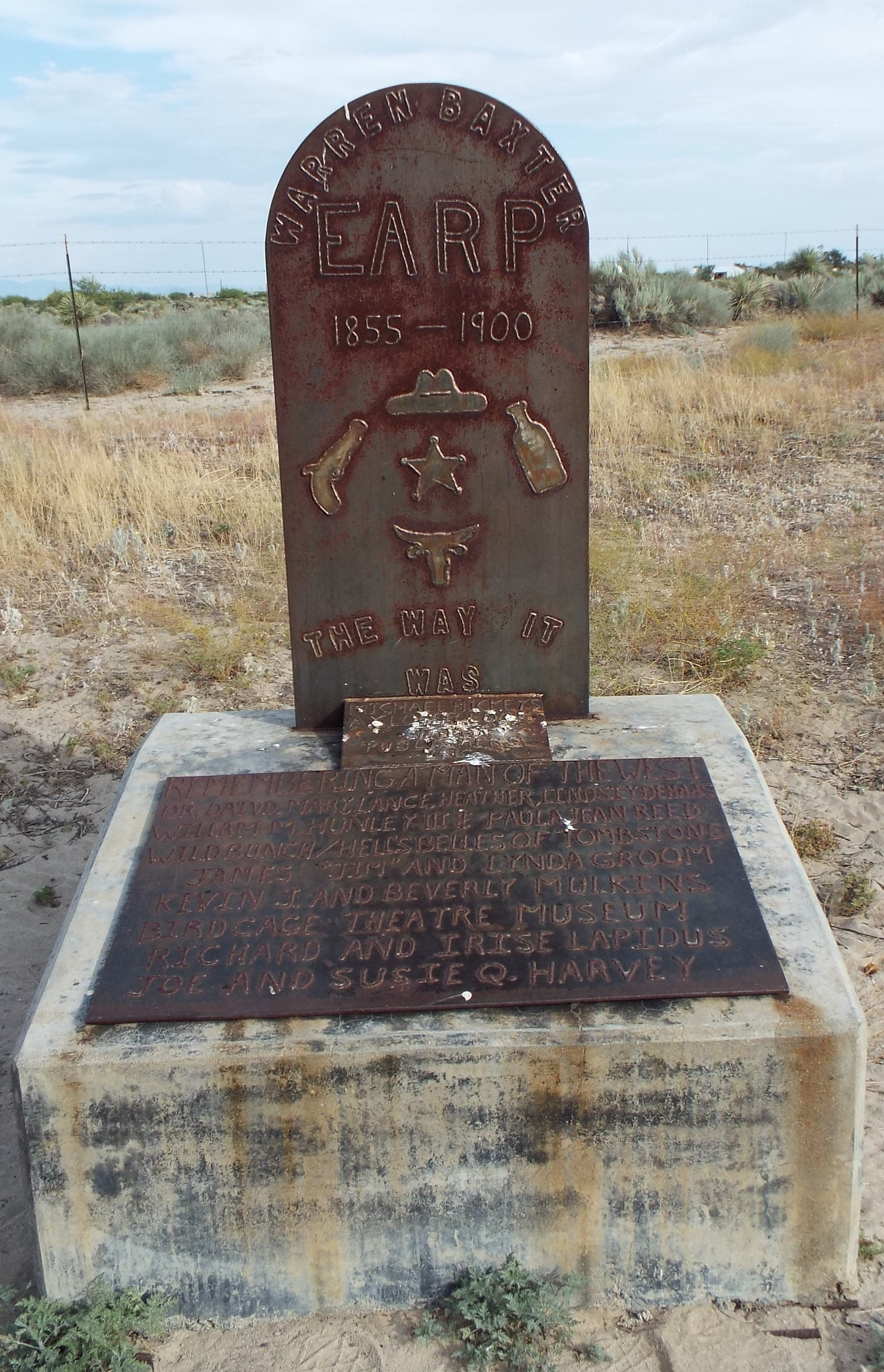
Grave of Warren Baxter Earp

Earp stepped calmly outside of the saloon onto the street without producing a weapon, just as Boyett fired two more rounds, missing again with both. Earp entered the saloon again and walked towards Boyett, opened his coat and vest. "I have not got arms. You have a good deal the best of this". Earp continued walking toward Boyett, talking the entire time. As Boyett warned him several times to halt, Boyett appearing slightly frightened but angry. When Earp did not stop, Boyett fired a fifth round, this time striking Earp in the chest, killing him almost instantly. Boyett claimed that he feared for his life, and that by allowing Warren Earp to get too close, he believed his life was in danger. Warren Earp was found to have no gun, though he had an open pocket knife in his fist. No arrest was made.

Lynn R. Baily, the daughter of rancher Henry Hooker, wrote in Henry Clay Hooker and the Sierra Bonita that "Virgil Earp sneaked into Willcox under an assumed name, checked into the hotel near Brown's Saloon, and began interviewing witnesses. He concluded his brother's death was "cold blooded murder even if Warren was drunk and abusive at the time."

The Tombstone Epitaph reported on July 9, 1900, "Warren Earp, tie [sic] youngest of the four Earp brothers whose names twenty years ago were synonymous with gun fighting on the Arizona frontier, 'died with his boots on' here. He was shot through, [sic] the heart in a saloon by Cowboy Johnny Boyett, and died almost Instantly."

Boyett was arrested for the shooting. The coroner's inquest confirmed that he killed Earp. Boyett sought protection from the local sheriff, fearing retribution from the Earp brothers. He returned to work on Hooker's ranch, staying out of Willcox for a long period of time. Wyatt did not get involved in the incident, nor did James or Newton. It was later falsely reported that the Earps avenged Warren's death by killing Boyett. Boyett eventually retired in Redlands, California. He later died in Texas. Warren Earp was buried in Willcox, Arizona in the Pioneer Cemetery.

== In popular culture ==
Warren is portrayed by Jim Caviezel in the movie Wyatt Earp (1994). Martyn Huntley portrayed him in the Doctor Who serial "The Gunfighters" in 1966. Warren Earp and his brothers are characters in Larry McMurtry’s Telegraph Days.
