= Committee (disambiguation) =

A committee is a body of one or more persons that is subordinate to a deliberative assembly.

Committee may also refer to:

- The Committee (film), British film, with music by the Pink Floyd (1968)
- Alan Committie, South African comic actor and qualified high school teacher

== See also ==
- Anti-Fascist Committee (disambiguation)
- Appropriations Committee (disambiguation)
- Banking Committee (disambiguation)
- Budget Committee (disambiguation)
- Committee of Public Safety (disambiguation)
- The Committee (disambiguation)
