= O.K. Corral hearing and aftermath =

Results following the Gunfight at the O.K. Corral in Tombstone, Arizona

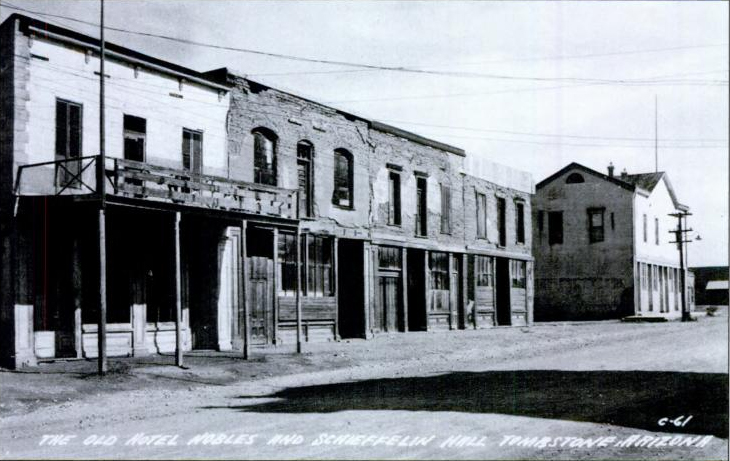
- The Gird Block containing the Mining Exchange Building where the hearing was held.
- Date: October 30, 1881 – March 19, 1882
- Location: Tombstone, Arizona Territory, United States
- Participants: Virgil, Morgan, Wyatt Earp, Doc Holliday vs. Ike Clanton, Florentino "Indian Charlie" Cruz, Curly Bill Brocius, Johnny Barnes, Pete Spence, Frank Stilwell, Frederick Bode, Johnny Behan
- Outcome: Holliday, Earps exonerated; Virgil ambushed, Morgan assassinated
- Deaths: Morgan Earp

The O.K. Corral hearing and aftermath was the direct result of the 30-second Gunfight at the O.K. Corral in Tombstone, Arizona Territory, on October 26, 1881. During that confrontation, Deputy U.S. Marshal and Tombstone Town Marshal Virgil Earp, Assistant Town Marshal Morgan Earp, and temporary deputy marshals Wyatt Earp and Doc Holliday shot and killed Billy Clanton, and Tom and Frank McLaury. Billy's brother Ike, who had repeatedly threatened to kill the Earps for some time, had been present at the gunfight but was unarmed and fled. As permitted by territory law, he filed murder charges against the Earps and Doc Holliday on October 30.

In an unusual preliminary hearing, Justice of the Peace Wells Spicer heard testimony from a large number of witnesses during the next 30 days. Friends of the Cowboys, most notably Cochise County Sheriff Johnny Behan, testified that the Cowboys had thrown up their hands or opened their coats and been shot in cold blood. Initially persuasive, his testimony motivated Spicer to jail Wyatt Earp and Doc Holliday who had been free on bond. Virgil and Morgan were recuperating from their wounds. Friends of the lawman and several key neutral witnesses then testified that the Cowboys had drawn their guns and that Virgil Earp had called out, "Hold, I don't want that!" or words to that effect. In a lengthy ruling, Spicer concluded there was no basis for a trial. Although he criticized Virgil Earp's use of Wyatt and Holliday as deputies, he concluded that no laws were broken by the lawmen. He said the evidence indicated that the Earps and Holliday acted within the law and that Holliday and Wyatt had been properly deputized by Virgil. He described Frank McLaury's insistence that he would not give up his weapons unless the marshal and his deputies also gave up their arms as a "proposition both monstrous and startling!"

The Earps were freed from jail, but the blood feud between the lawmen and their friends and the Cowboys and their allies escalated. On December 14, Justice Spicer received a threatening letter from "a miner" who threatened to kill him and told him to leave Tombstone. On the same day, someone tried to kill Tombstone Mayor John Clum, who was a member of the Citizens Safety Committee and publisher of The Tombstone Epitaph that had consistently supported the Earps. On December 28, 1881, Virgil Earp was ambushed and hit by a shotgun round that crippled his left arm. The Earps thought they knew who the perpetrators were, but witnesses provided alibis for them. On March 18, Morgan was killed while playing billiards. An assassin shot him through the window of a door that opened up into an alley. A bullet intended for Wyatt struck close above his head. Once again, the Earps believed they knew the men responsible, but the testimony of a key witness was inadmissible and the Cowboys were not charged.

Wyatt assumed Virgil's duties as Deputy U.S. Marshal for eastern Pima County. He concluded that he could not rely on the courts for justice and decided to take matters into his own hands. He believed that the only way to deal with the Earp's enemies was to kill them. He assembled a federal posse that intercepted Frank Stilwell laying in wait near the train station in Tucson and killed him. They then scoured the countryside looking for others they believed responsible. During early April 1882, Wyatt and his posse tracked down and killed Florentino "Indian Charlie" Cruz, Curly Bill Brocius, and Johnny Barnes, three of the men they believed were responsible for their brothers' ambush and murder. The ride for vengeance came to be called the Earp Vendetta Ride. Five of the Earp party were wanted on a warrant for killing Frank Stilwell, and they left Arizona Territory and never returned.

== Background ==
=== Media response ===
The two newspapers in Tombstone usually opposed each other in their reporting, but both newspapers' stories after the gunfight initially supported the lawmen's version of events. The Daily Nugget was a Democratic newspaper loyal to Sheriff Behan and the rural Cowboys, but their pro-Cowboy publisher Harry Woods was out of town. Richard Rule, an experienced reporter, knew Behan personally and very likely interviewed him after the gun fight. He wrote the story for Nugget published on the day after the shootout, and it backed up the Earps' version of events. Rule wrote in the style of the day by telling a story without attributing sources or naming witnesses.

The 26th of October, 1881, will always be marked as one of the crimson days in the annals of Tombstone, a day when blood flowed as water, and human life was held as a shuttle cock, a day to be remembered as witnessing the bloodiest and deadliest street fight that has ever occurred in this place, or probably in the Territory. ... During the shooting Sheriff Behan was standing nearby commanding the contestants to cease firing but was powerless to prevent it.

Rule reported that the battle began when Frank made a motion for his pistol, and that Wyatt responded by drawing and firing his pistol. He wrote that Doc Holliday fired a short-barreled shotgun. Rule's account backed up the actions taken by the Earp brothers and Holliday. Rule's article varied widely from Behan's and the Cowboys' later court testimony. Subsequent stories about the gunfight published in the Nugget after that day supported Behan and the Cowboys' view of events.

The October 28, 1881, issue of The Tombstone Epitaph, which was loyal to the Republican business establishment, was more restrained in its language:

The feeling among the best class of our citizens is that the Marshal was entirely justified in his efforts to disarm these men, and that being fired upon they had to defend themselves which they did most bravely ... The funeral of the McLaury brothers and Clanton yesterday was numerically one of the largest ever witnessed in Tombstone. It took place at 3:30 from the undertaking parlor of Messers. Ritter and Ream. The procession, headed by the Tombstone brass band, moved down Allen Street and thence to the cemetery. The sidewalks were densely packed for three to four blocks. The body of Clanton was in the first hearse, and those of the two McLaury brothers in the second, side by side, and were interred in the same grave. It was a most impressive and saddening sight and such a one as it is to be hoped may never occur again in this community."

Other stories in the Epitaph countered the Nugget's later view entirely and supported the lawmen. Since The Tombstone Epitaph was the local Associated Press client, its story was the version of events that most readers across the United States read first.

=== Public reaction ===
The initial public reaction was largely favorable to the Earps, but began to change when rumors began to circulate that Ike Clanton and Tom McLaury were unarmed, and that Billy Clanton and Tom McLaury even threw up their hands before the shooting. Within a few days, Phineas "Phin" Clanton arrived in town, and some began to claim that the Earps and Holliday had committed murder, instead of enforcing the law. Clara Spalding Brown, the wife of mining engineer Theodore Brown, was a correspondent for the San Diego Union and other California newspapers. She wrote that Tombstone residents were divided about the justification for the killings. Referring to the initial testimony offered by Ike Clanton, she wrote:

Opinion is pretty divided as to the justification of the killing. You may meet one man who will support the Earps, and declare that no other course was possible to save their own lives, and the next man is just as likely to assert that there was no occasion whatever for bloodshed, and that this will be 'a warm place' for the Earps hereafter. At the inquest yesterday, the damaging fact was ascertained that only two of the cowboys were armed, it thus being a most unequal fight.

Even the Governor of the Arizona Territory, John C. Frémont, reported after the gunfight, "Many of the very best law-abiding and peace-loving citizens [of Tombstone] have no confidence in the willingness of the civil officers to pursue and bring to justice that element of out-lawry so largely disturbing the sense of security ... [The opinion] is quite prevalent that the civil officers are quite largely in league with the leaders of this disturbing and dangerous element."

=== Conflicting record of events ===
It is not known who started shooting first. Accounts by both participants and eye-witnesses were contradictory. Those loyal to one side or the other told conflicting stories and independent eyewitnesses who did not know the participants by sight were unable to say for certain who shot first. All witnesses agreed that general firing almost immediately commenced. Most witnesses reported the first two shots were so close together that they could barely be distinguished. Some witnesses testified that Morgan and Doc fired across one another at Billy and Frank, respectively. Wyatt said that he and Billy Clanton had fired first, and Virgil confirmed that one of the first shots was fired by Billy Clanton. Witnesses could not agree on whether Tom McLaury was armed.

The existing record of the events surrounding the gunfight and the testimony given at the preliminary hearing are provided by three primary sources. The first two are the newspapers, The Tombstone Epitaph and The Nugget. Reporters from both newspapers covered the hearings and recorded the testimony at the coroner's inquest and the Spicer hearings, but only the reporter from the Nugget knew shorthand. The third source was the court recorder, who took down the testimony in longhand. Testimony recorded by the court recorder and the two reporters varied greatly. Generally the Nugget coverage was more complete, but occasionally the Epitaph offered information not found elsewhere.

Author Stuart N. Lake, who wrote the extremely popular biography Wyatt Earp: Frontier Marshal, relied on the surviving portion of the court record, which he described as a "sheaf of original handwritten documents rescued from oblivion."

Part-time newspaper reporter Howell 'Pat' Hayhurst, sponsored by the Federal Writers' Project, part of the Works Progress Administration, transcribed all of the testimony from the hearing in the early 1930s. However, it's known that Hayhurst arbitrarily edited and removed text that he decided was not relevant. The documents were subsequently lost and are still unaccounted for. Hayhurst seemed to have an antipathy toward Wyatt Earp. Author Alan Barra believes Hayhurst was a friend of Albert Behan, Johnny Behan's son. After he completed his transcription, he kept the original document in his home, where it was destroyed in a house fire. Lake later said Hayhurst 'mutilated' the transcription.

Alford E. Turner published The OK Corral Inquest based on the Hayhurst transcription, minus his edits, in 1981, and added his own footnotes. He hired a typist to copy the Hayhurst transcription, which introduced additional errors and omissions. A copy of the Hayhurst transcription is in the Goldwater collection at Arizona State University.

=== Coroner's report ===
Coroner Henry M. Matthews convened the Coroner's Inquest. For unknown reasons, he chose individuals mostly sympathetic to the Cowboys: Ike Clanton, William Claiborne, C.H. Light, John Behan, R.F. Coleman, William Cuddy, Peter Fallehy, and Mrs. Martha King. Matthews examined the dead Cowboys and reported his findings to the inquest members. The Tombstone Epitaph reported and commented on the coroner's jury's findings:

The coroner's jury, after deliberating for two hours in regard to the late killing of William Clanton, Frank and Thomas McLaury, brought in a verdict that the men named came to their deaths in the town of Tombstone on October 26, 1881, from the effect of pistol and gunshot wounds inflicted by Virgil Earp, Morgan Earp, Wyatt Earp and one Holliday commonly called "Doc" Holliday. The verdict does not seem to meet with general approval, as it does not state whether the cowboys were killed by the marshal and his party in the discharge of their duty, or whether the killing was justifiable.

Matthews testified at the inquest that Tom McLaury had been killed by a single shotgun blast, contradicting Behan's testimony that he had been shot with a pistol, which according to the defense, "... to make any sense, the court would have to believe that Holliday marched down Fremont Street carrying a shotgun; put it aside in order to pull out his pistol; fired the first shot, presumably at Billy Clanton; and then picked up the shotgun in order to kill Tom McLaury—all in the space of a few seconds." Under questioning, Matthews said he did not see Ike Clanton appeal to Wyatt to not shoot him.

=== Earps and Holliday arrested ===
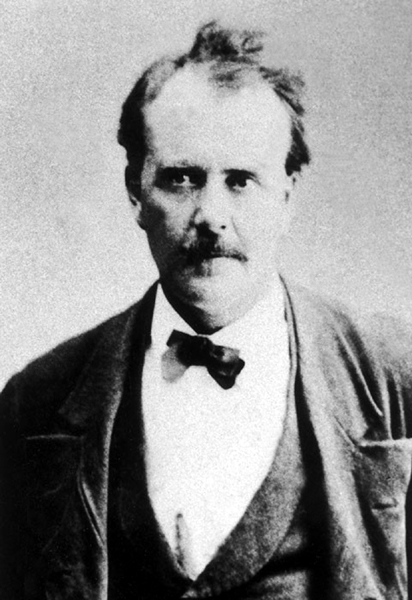
Justice of the Peace Wells Spicer

Four days after the Gunfight at the O.K. Corral, as permitted by territorial law, Ike Clanton applied by affidavit for an arrest warrant against Doc Holliday and the Earps. Because Morgan and Virgil were incapacitated by their wounds, they were recovering at home, and were not required to post bail. Wyatt and Holliday were arrested and brought before Justice of the Peace Wells Spicer. Spicer initially denied bail because it was a capital case, but "upon a showing of facts by affidavit," decided to exercise judicial discretion, and granted Wyatt and Holliday $10,000 bail, about $333,621 today.

Their bail was paid by contributions from James Earp, Tom Fitch (their attorney), Robert J. Winders (a mining partner), E. B. Gage (part-owner and superintendent of the Grand Central Mining Company), Fred J. Dodge (Wells Fargo undercover agent), and other business owners appreciative of the Earps' efforts. Wyatt contributed $7,000 to Holliday's bail amount. Gage was also a prominent Republican and a member of the Citizens Safety Committee.

Fitch was one of the most experienced criminal defense lawyers in the region. Justice Spicer was a Republican and had mutual friends in common with the Earps. He had been a lawyer, prospector, land speculator, and journalist. The defense appeared to bet its case on winning a preliminary hearing in front of Spicer, rather than in front of a jury that might be composed of Cowboy loyalists. The city council suspended Virgil Earp as town marshal pending the outcome of the hearing. James Flynn was named to replace him.

=== Preliminary hearing convened ===
After Ike Clanton filed murder charges, Justice Spicer convened the preliminary hearing in the Mining Exchange Building on October 31 to determine if there was enough evidence to go to trial. In an unusual proceeding, Spicer took written and oral testimony from a number of witnesses over more than a month.

== Prosecution team and witnesses ==
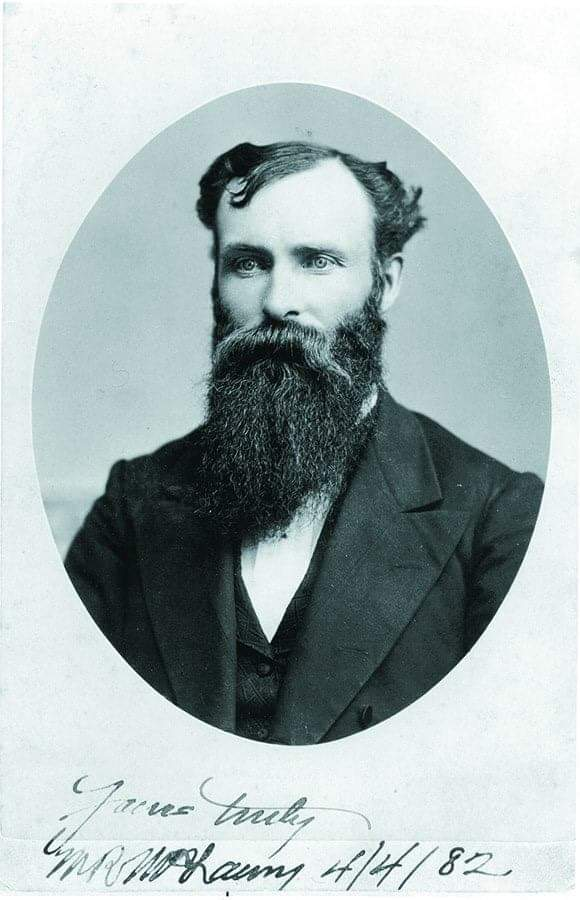
Lawyer William McLaurey, brother of Tom and Frank, who were killed in the Gunfight at the OK Corral

The preliminary hearing was prosecuted by Republican District Attorney Lyttleton Price, assisted by John M. Murphy, James Robinson, and Ben Goodrich. During initial motions, they tried to invalidate Justice Spicer's ability to render a decision. They argued that as justice of the peace he was merely an administrative officer and had no power to pass judgement on the evidence submitted. They submitted that his only duty was to note the evidence submitted along with the objections taken. Spicer denied the motion, stating that he was acting as the court and had the power to pass on the admissibility of all evidence put before the court.

Price and his team were joined on November 4 by William McLaury, Frank and Tom's older brother, and an able attorney from Ft. Worth, Texas. The outlaw Cowboys were anxious for a ruling finding the lawmen guilty of murder. A travel writer from New York reported that the Earps had sufficient influence in town that they would go free, but that Cowboys were "flocking into town, and on one quiet Sunday afternoon in particular things wore an ominous look. It was said that should justice fail to be done, the vengeful, resolute men conferring darkly at the edges of the sidewalk would attempt to take the matter into their own hands."

=== Will McLaury threats ===
Will McLaury appeared to be genuinely convinced that Ike Clanton was telling the truth, that the Earps and Holliday and taken part in a scheme to rob stages, and that the Earps and Holliday had killed his brothers hiding behind their badges in the execution of the Cowboys. He arrived with every intention of seeing the Earps and Holliday pay for killing his brothers by "one means or another." After Wyatt Earp and Doc Holliday were jailed during the fifth day of the hearing, Will McLaury wrote about the hearing and the events in a letter to his sister. He implied in his letters that if he wasn't successful obtaining justice through the courts that he might call on armed friends to kill the lawmen.

I think their only hope is escape and should they escape from jail their bones will bleach on the mountains ... I find a large number of Texas friends here who are ready willing to stand by me and with Winchesters if necessary[.] The only thing now is to keep my friends quiet. there Came near being a general killing here last night which had it not been prevented would have closed my business here. I am trying to punish these men through the courts if the country first it that fails—then we may submit.

In another letter, Will McLaury stated it was his duty to see that the lawmen were punished.

I think I can put an end to this thing in a couple hours and I cannot afford to do it nor even conspire at it. But this thing has a tendency to arouse all the devil there is in me. It will not bring my brothers back to prosecute these men. But I regard it as my duty to myself and family to see that these brutes do not go unwhipped of justice. Exercising our own judgment must as to our business and as to my affairs do the same.

Later in November he wrote his sister again, who had criticized him as a single father for leaving his family in Texas for such a long period.

My children will be provided for and I dont think a father would be any great advantage to them who would leave it to God to punish men who murdered their uncles.

=== Martha J. King ===
Martha J. King was in Bauer's butcher shop, next door to the O.K. Corral's rear entrance, when she saw the Earp party walk by four abreast, headed towards Fly's Boarding House and Photography Studio. She saw Holliday, nearest to the building, carrying "a gun, not a pistol" under his overcoat on the left side.

=== C.H. Light ===
C. H. "Ham" Light, a business partner of Pete Spence and a friend to the Cowboys, heard the first two shots from his room at the Aztec House across the corner from the fight, and went to the window in time to see all but the first two shots fired. According to Light, at that time Tom McLaury was already moving onto Fremont Street, away from the empty lot, although other eyewitness accounts placed Tom's movement later.

=== Sheriff Johnny Behan ===
As Cochise County Sheriff, Johnny Behan was the most significant witness for the prosecution. The first story published in the Nuggett the day after the shooting, which was usually very friendly to the Cowboys, stated that Behan "was standing near by commanding the contestants to cease firing but was powerless to prevent it." But Behan's testimony contradicted what was reported in the Nuggett. On the third day of the hearing, Behan began two days on the stand. Behan said he tried to persuade the Cowboys to give up their weapons and attempted to stop the Earps from confronting them.

Behan testified that from the time the Earps passed him by to confront the Cowboys, he had watched them closely. Behan gave strong testimony that the Cowboys had not resisted but either threw up their hands or turned out their coats to show they were not armed. He said that the Earp group started shooting first. "I suppose that there was as many as 8 or 10 shots before I saw arms in the hands of any of the McLaury or Clanton party."

But Behan offered confusing testimony about which member of the lawmen first pulled the trigger. He testified he "saw a shotgun before the fight commenced. Doc Holliday had it. He had it under his coat." He said he did not see the shotgun used. He also said that, "My impression at the time was that Holliday had the nickel-plated pistol", that "The nickel-plated pistol was the first to fire," and that "The nickel-plated pistol was fired by the second man from the right."

He told the court that he heard Billy Clanton say, "Don't shoot me. I don't want to fight." He also testified that Tom McLaury threw open his coat to show that he was not armed and that the first two shots were fired by the Earp party. Behan denied hearing either the Clantons or McLaurys make any threats against the Earps or Holliday beforehand. He also denied telling the Earps, "I have got them disarmed." But Behan had motive to lie. Ever since he reneged on his promise to put Wyatt in as his deputy once he won the election, the two had been at odds. And there was also the possibility that Behan knew of the attraction if not a relationship between Josie and Wyatt.

Under cross-examination by Earp's attorney, he admitted seeing Holliday carrying the messenger shotgun towards the confrontation. All the witnesses testified that they saw Holliday carrying a shotgun. Behan's testimony for the prosecution initially turned public opinion against the Earps. He portrayed a far different gunfight than had been first reported in both of the Tombstone papers. But he was also challenged by the defense attorney about a conversation he reportedly had with Virgil Earp the evening of the gunfight during which he supported their version of events. Fitch asked Behan if while visiting the Earps that night if he had said, "I heard you say, `Boys, throw up your hands; I have come to disarm you,' when one of the McLowry boys said, `We will, and drew his gun, and shooting then commenced. I am your friend, and you did perfectly right,' or language of the same substance or import?" Behan equivocated and did not directly answer the question.

=== Thomas Allen ===
Thomas Allen said he thought Holliday fired first and that it was a pistol shot.

=== Ike Clanton ===
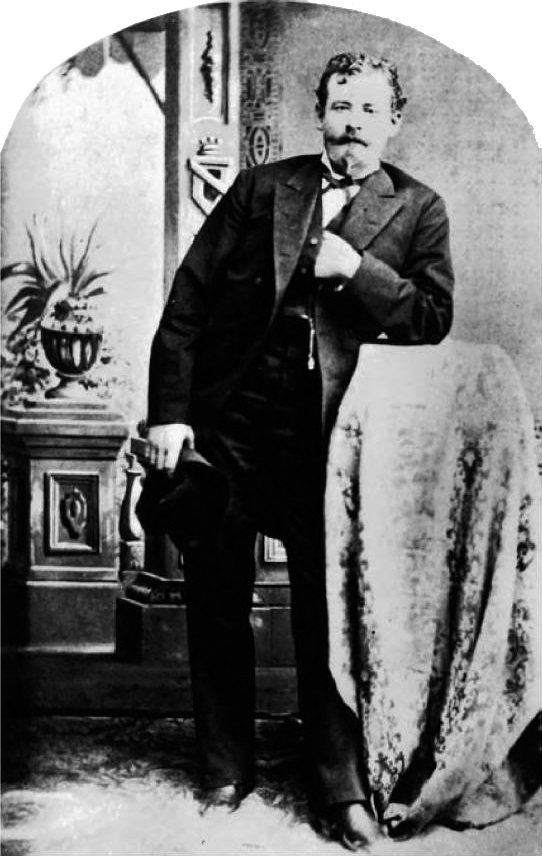
Ike Clanton

Ike Clanton took the stand on November 9. He repeated in his testimony the story of abuse that he had suffered at the hands of the Earps and Holliday the night before the gunfight. He denied threatening the Earps. He testified that the Clantons and Frank McLaury raised their hands after Virgil's command, and Tom thrust open his vest to show he was unarmed. Clanton said Wyatt shoved his revolver in his belly, telling him, "You son-of-a-bitch, you can have a fight!"

Clanton backed up Behan's testimony that Holliday and Morgan Earp had fired the first two shots and that the next several shots also came from the Earp party. Under cross-examination, Clanton said that Doc Holliday, Virgil Earp, Wyatt Earp, and Morgan Earp had all confided in him that they had actually been involved in the stage robbery. He further claimed that Holliday had told him that Holliday had "piped off" money from the stage before it left, although no money was missing, and the stage had not been successfully robbed. Clanton also said Holliday had confessed to him about killing the stage driver. Clanton testified that Wyatt Earp had threatened to kill him and his confederates because Earp feared they would reveal his part in the robbery.

Murder was a capital offense, and given their acrimonious relationship, it was unlikely Holliday would confide in Clanton. These and other inconsistencies in Clanton's testimony lacked credibility. By the time he finished his testimony, the entire prosecution case had become suspect.

Will McLaury believed Clanton's testimony. He wrote his sister the next day, telling her, "I send you papers containing the evidence. I shall try to have these men hanged." He also wrote his partner in his legal practice, Captain Greene, and told him, "As to the perpetration of the crime, I can only say it was as cold-blooded and foul a murder as has been recorded."

Clanton stated that Wyatt's motive for murdering the Cowboys was based on a stagecoach robbery on March 15, 1881. He claimed that the Earps and Holliday had robbed the stage, and killed the Cowboys to cover up the crime. He told the court that Earp wanted to conceal his family's involvement in the Benson stage robbery and had sworn him to secrecy, and that Morgan Earp had confided in him that he and Wyatt had "piped off $1,400 to Doc Holliday and Bill Leonard", who were supposed to be on the stage the night when Bud Philpot was killed. Clanton told the court, "I was not going to have anything to do with helping to capture—" and then he corrected himself "—kill Bill Leonard, Crane, and Harry Head". Clanton denied having any knowledge of the Wells Fargo telegram confirming the reward money.

=== Billy Claiborne ===
Billy Claiborne, who had run from the fight, supported Ike Clanton's testimony as well. Claiborne also backed up the version of events testified to by Behan that placed a nickel-plated pistol in Holliday's hands, and that Holliday opened the fight with a shot from his nickel-plated pistol. Claiborne said, "They came within ten feet of where we were standing. When they got to the corner of Fly's building, they had their six-shooters in their hands, and Marshal Earp said, 'You sons-of-bitches, you've been looking for a fight, and you can have it!' And then said, 'Throw up your hands.'"

=== Wes Fuller ===
Cowboy Wesley Fuller, who had initially been at the back of the empty lot near the rear of Fly's studio, corroborated Clanton's version of events. He testified that he heard the Earps say, "Throw up your hands!" He said Billy Clanton threw up his hands, saying, "Don't shoot me! I don't want to fight!" and the shooting began immediately. The prosecution asked Fuller if on November 5 he had told Wyatt that he intended to "cinch Holliday." He responded, "I don't say positively I might have used words, 'I mean to cinch Holliday.'"

Over several days, the prosecution's witnesses testified that Tom McLaury was unarmed, that Billy Clanton had his hands in the air, and that neither of the McLaurys were troublemakers. They portrayed Ike Clanton and Tom McLaury as being unjustly bullied and beaten by the vengeful Earps on the day of the gunfight. On the strength of the prosecution case, Spicer revoked bail for Doc and Wyatt Earp and had them arrested on November 7, and they spent the next 16 days in jail.

== Defense team and witnesses ==
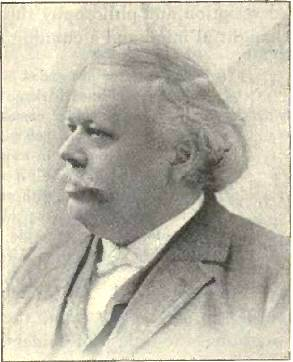
The Earps hired Tom Fitch as their defense counsel. He was an experienced trial lawyer, a terrific speaker, and was nicknamed the "silver-tongued orator of the Pacific."

Tom Fitch, the Earps' defense counsel, was an experienced trial lawyer. He had gained a reputation as the "silver-tongued orator of the Pacific." Fitch was one of the best-known legal and political figures on the American frontier in the 1880s. He carried impressive credentials: he was a former state legislator from California, had been Nevada's Representative to the United States House of Representatives, was former general counsel for Brigham Young and the Church of Jesus Christ of Latter-day Saints in the Utah Territory, and a close friend of Arizona's governor John C. Frémont.

Fitch was assisted by his law partner and future mayor of San Diego, Will Hunsaker. The Earps raised defense funds from E.B. Gage and others.

=== Defense testimony ===
The defense won a key motion when they persuaded Justice Spicer to allow testimony about the history of threats made against the Earps. While Morgan, who had been shot in the back, remained bedridden throughout the trial and did not testify, Spicer moved the proceedings to the Cosmopolitan Hotel so Virgil Earp, who had been hit in the calf, could testify from his bed.

=== Holliday's role ===
The defense wanted to cast doubt on Behan, Claiborne and Allen's testimony that Doc Holliday or a "man" had fired his nickel-plated pistol first. The defense pointed out that the prosecution's scenario would have required Holliday to fire his pistol first, switch to the shotgun to shoot Tom McLaury, then switch back to the pistol to continue firing. Author Allen Barra pointed out that this sequence is unbelievable. Holliday was fighting for his life and switching weapons twice in the first few seconds doesn't make sense. Doc Holliday was defended by United States Court Commissioner Thomas J. Drum. Given Doc Holliday's reputation as a hothead, the defense decided to not call him to the stand. Virgil, Wyatt and other witnesses testified that Holliday was carrying a shotgun before the gunfight.

Modern writers including Paula Mitchell Marks and Alford Turner have advanced the theory that Holliday somehow managed to hold and accurately fire two weapons ambidextrously, but none of the witnesses including Behan reported observing this. Firing even a short messenger shotgun is a two-handed effort.

Three witnesses—H.F Sills, Addie Bourland, and Judge J. H. Lucas—eventually gave key evidence that swayed Justice Spicer to hold that there was not enough evidence to indict the Earps and Doc Holliday for murder.

=== Wyatt Earp ===
Fitch had Wyatt Earp prepare a written statement, as permitted by Section 133 of Arizona law, which would not allow the prosecution to cross-examine him. On November 16, when Wyatt was called to the stand and began to read his statement, the prosecution vociferously objected. Although the statute wasn't specific about whether it was legal for a defendant to read his statement, Spicer allowed his testimony to proceed.

Wyatt testified about the stagecoach robbery described by Ike Clanton as his motive for murdering the Cowboys. He stated that he offered Ike Clanton and Frank McLaury the $3,600 Wells Fargo reward money in return for information about the identities of the three robbers. He testified that he hoped that arresting the murderers would boost his chances for election as Cochise County sheriff. According to testimony given by Wyatt and Virgil, both McLaury and Clanton agreed to provide information to assist in capturing Leonard, Head, and Crain, but they never had a chance to fulfill the agreement. All three suspects were killed when attempting other robberies.

Wyatt detailed the Earps' previous troubles with the Clantons and McLaurys and explained that they intended to disarm the cowboys. Reading from his written statement, he said that "The first two shots were fired by Billy Clanton and myself, he shooting at me, and I shooting at Frank McLaury." He said that he knew Frank was a better shot, so he aimed for Frank first. He said he drew his gun only after Billy Clanton and Frank McLaury went for their pistols and that he and the other lawmen fired in self-defense.

After the defense had established doubts about the prosecution's case, Justice Spicer released Holliday and Wyatt from jail to rejoin their families in time for Thanksgiving. Mining executives E.B. Gage and James Vizina paid the lawmen's $20,000 bail.

=== Winfield Williams ===
When questioned by Fitch during his earlier testimony, Behan denied that he had told Virgil he'd seen a McLaury brother draw first, or said to Virgil, "I am your friend," and that Virgil "had done the right thing." Fitch called Deputy District Attorney Winfield Scott Williams, who had been appointed by District Attorney Price. Williams was present when Behan visited Virgil the evening after the gunfight. He affirmed Virgil's memory of the visit and contradicted Behan's testimony about the conversation. In that conversation, according to Williams, Behan told Virgil that one of the McLaury brothers drew his gun first, and "I am your friend, and you did perfectly right."

=== H.F Sills ===
One of the most notable witnesses was H. F. Sills, an AT&SF RR engineer. He had been temporarily furloughed from his job and found a room in a lodging house in Tombstone only the day before he witnessed the shootout. He stayed there for nine or ten days, recovering from an undefined illness. He was then admitted to a hospital where he remained for more than two weeks before he appeared at the hearing on November 22. Sills didn't know any of the parties involved and had no knowledge of any of the events prior to the day of the gunfight. He could only report what he saw and heard since his arrival.

I saw four or five men standing in front of the O. K. Corral on October 26th, about two o'clock in the afternoon, talking of some trouble they had had with Virgil Earp, and they made threats at the time that on meeting him they would kill him on sight. Some one of the party spoke up at the time and said: "That they would kill the whole party of Earps when they met them." I then walked up the street and made inquiry as to who Virgil Earp and the Earps were. A man on the street pointed out Virgil Earp to me and told me he was the city marshal. I went over and called him one side, and told him of the threats that I had overheard this party make. One of the men that made the threats had a bandage around his head at the time, and the day of the funeral he was pointed out to me as Isaac Clanton.

Testifying about the gunfight itself, he said he saw "the marshal go up and speak to this other party. I ... saw them pull out their revolvers immediately. The marshal had a cane in his right hand at the time. He throwed up his hand and spoke. I did not hear the words though. By that time Billy Clanton and Wyatt Earp had fired their guns off."

Grilled by the prosecution, he corroborated virtually all of the defense's testimony. Because his view of events was so neutral, some Cowboys thought he was a plant or part of a conspiracy intended to discredit the Cowboys. Little information can be found today on Sills before he came to Tombstone and he vanished afterward, except for a brief mention in one newspaper three months later: "Engineer Sill, who formerly drove a locomotive on the Las Vegas division, is in California."

Some modern researchers have tried to discredit Sills' testimony, questioning the perfect timing of his arrival in Tombstone and his exact corroboration of the Earps' view of events. They believe Sills may have had an earlier connection to the Earps and was tutored in his testimony. But Sills included in his testimony two key details about his employment history that have been confirmed. He said that he "went to Omaha, Nebraska ... I was an apprentice in the machine shop, locomotive fireman on the road, and locomotive engineer. During the time I served my apprenticeship Mr. Congden was general mechanic, and Mr. McConnell was foreman." Both of these names have been found in Omaha city directories of that time period, apparently confirming the truthfulness of his identity and some portions of his testimony.

=== Addie Bourland ===
The second key witness was Addie Bourland, a dressmaker whose residence was across Fremont Street from Fly's Boarding House. She testified that she saw both sides facing each other, that none of the Cowboys had held their hands up, that the firing was general, and that she had not seen Billy Clanton fall immediately as the Cowboys had testified. After her initial testimony, Spicer decided to personally interview Addie Bourland. She had presented confusing testimony and he recalled her to the stand to answer his questions, much to the dismay and objections of the prosecution. In her second visit to Spicer's courtroom, she said a man stepped forward and poked a large, bronze pistol into an unnamed Cowboy's belly, then took a couple of steps backward. She didn't see anyone raise their hands.

=== Judge J. H. Lucas ===
The third witness was Judge J.H. Lucas of the Cochise County Probate Court, whose office was in the Mining Exchange Building about 200 feet (61 m) from the shootout. Lucas corroborated Addie Bourland's testimony that Billy Clanton was standing throughout the fight, which contradicted prosecution witnesses who maintained he went down immediately after being shot at close range in the belly. Spicer noted that no powder burns were found on Clanton's clothing, which contradicted the plaintiff's claims that he had been shot at close range. Only when Clanton went down at the end did the general firing cease.

== Ruling ==
These witnesses' testimony, especially that of H.F. Sills, discredited much of the testimony given by Sheriff Johnny Behan, Ike Clanton and the other Cowboy witnesses. In his ruling, Spicer specifically mentioned Sills' testimony:

At this time Virgil Earp was informed by one H.F. Sills, engineer from the A.T.& S.F.R.R., then absent from duty on a layoff furlough, and who had arrived in town only the day before and totally unacquainted with any person in town or the state of affairs existing here, that he [Sills] had overheard armed parties, just then passing through the O.K. Corral, say, in effect, that they would make sure to kill Earp the marshal, and would kill all the Earps.

Sills' lack of knowledge of the parties enhanced his credibility with Justice Spicer and may have been the deciding factor in his ruling. After extensive testimony, Justice Spicer ruled on November 30 that there was not enough evidence to indict the lawmen. He noted that the doctor who examined the dead Cowboys established that the wounds they received could not have occurred if their hands and arms had been in the positions that prosecution witnesses described. He said the evidence indicated that the Earps and Holliday acted within the law and that Holliday and Wyatt had been deputized temporarily by Virgil.

In his ruling, he noted that Ike Clanton had the night before, while unarmed, publicly declared that the Earp brothers and Holliday had insulted him, and that when he was armed he intended to shoot them or fight them on sight. On the morning of the shooting he was armed with revolver and Winchester rifle. Spicer noted that:

Witnesses for the prosecution state unequivocally that William Clanton fell or was shot at the first fire and Claiborne says he was shot when the pistol was only about a foot from his belly. Yet it is clear that there were no powder burns or marks on his clothes. And Judge Lucas says he saw him fire or in the act of firing several times before he was shot, and he thinks two shots afterwards.

He also wrote in his decision that Ike Clanton had claimed the Earps were out to murder him, yet even though he was unarmed, the Earps had allowed him to escape unharmed during the fight. He wrote, "the great fact, most prominent in the matter, to wit, that Isaac Clanton was not injured at all, and could have been killed first and easiest." He described Frank McLaury's insistence that he would not give up his weapons unless the marshal and his deputies also gave up their arms as a "proposition both monstrous and startling!" He noted that the prosecution claimed that the Cowboys' purpose was to leave town, yet Ike Clanton and Billy Claiborne did not have their weapons with them.

Spicer did not condone all of the Earps' actions and criticized Virgil Earp's use of Wyatt and Holliday as deputies, but he concluded that no laws were broken.

In view of these controversies between Wyatt Earp and Isaac Clanton and Thomas McLaury, and in further view of this quarrel the night before between Isaac Clanton and J. H. Holliday, I am of the opinion that the defendant, Virgil Earp, as chief of police, subsequently calling upon Wyatt Earp, and J. H. Holliday to assist him in arresting and disarming the Clantons and McLaurys—committed an injudicious and censurable act, and although in this he acted incautiously and without due circumspection, yet when we consider the condition of affairs incidental to a frontier country, the lawlessness and disregard for human life; the existence of a law-defying element in our midst; the fear and feeling of insecurity that has existed; the supposed prevalence of bad, desperate and reckless men who have been a terror to the country, and kept away capital and enterprise, and considering the many threats that have been made against the Earps, I can attach no criminality to his unwise act. In fact, as the result plainly proves, he needed the assistance and support of staunch and true friends, upon whose courage, coolness and fidelity he could depend, in case of an emergency.

Spicer invited the grand jury to confirm his findings. Two weeks later, they agreed with Spicer's ruling and also refused to indict the lawmen. Even though the Earps and Holliday were free, their reputations had been tarnished. Supporters of the Cowboys in Tombstone looked upon the Earps as murderers.

== Aftermath ==
The newspapers followed the hearings closely. When Spicer announced his decision, the Arizona Weekly Citizen on March 26, 1882, wrote: "These facts are sorely entitled to sufficient consideration to prevent the homicide thus legally declared to be justifiable from being classed with deeds of secret murder."

On about December 14, Justice Spicer received a threatening letter from "A Miner," which said in part, "But it is only a matter of time you will get it sooner or later" and told him that he should leave Tombstone. He responded with a defiant letter published by The Tombstone Epitaph, stating he would not bow to threats from the rabble of the city. He wrote that some of the citizenry "would like to be thugs if they had courage; would be proud to be called cowboys, if people gave them that distinction; but as they can be neither, they do the best they can to show how vile they are ...", concluding that "I will be here just where they can find me if they want me". Wells Fargo Agent Marshall Williams, Mayor John Clum, attorney Tom Fitch, Oriental Saloon owner Lou Rickabaugh, and the Earps were also threatened.

=== Ike refiles charges ===
In December, Ike Clanton went before Justice of the Peace J.B. Smith in Contention City and again filed murder charges against the Earps and Holliday. A large posse escorted the Earps to Contention, fearing that the cowboys would try to ambush the Earps on the unprotected road. The charges were dismissed by Judge J. H. Lucas because of Smith's judicial ineptness. The prosecution immediately filed a new warrant for murder charges, issued by Justice Smith, but Judge Lucas equally quickly dismissed it, writing that new evidence would have to be submitted before a second hearing could be called. Because the November hearing before Spicer was not a trial, Clanton had the right to continue pushing for prosecution, but the prosecution would have to come up with new evidence of murder before the case could be considered.

=== Mayor Clum attacked ===
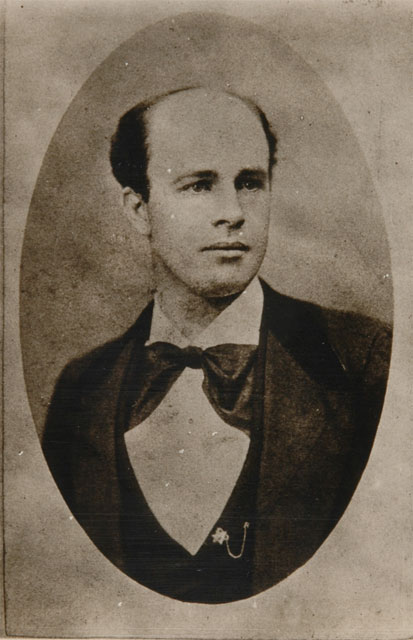
John P Clum, mayor and publisher of The Tombstone Epitaph

On December 14, two weeks after Justice of the Peace Spicer handed down his decision, someone tried to kill John Clum. He was publisher of The Tombstone Epitaph whose newspaper had consistently supported the Earps, a member of the Citizens Safety Committee, and Mayor of Tombstone. While on a stage en route to Benson, it was fired upon by unknown assailants. The stage carried no mail, cash, or silver, so robbery was an unlikely motive for the attack. Stagecoach driver Jimmie Harrington was able to outrun the attackers, but had to stop to remove a lead horse that had been shot through and was bleeding to death. Clum, certain the attackers were trying to kill him, did not reboard the stage but walked several miles until he found a horse he could borrow. He got to Benson the next day.

=== Additional witness found ===
The Kansas City Star ran a story that was reprinted by The Tombstone Epitaph on December 30, 1881, about a witness who had never been called during the preliminary hearing. According to the Star, a Mrs. J. C. Colyer had been visiting the home of her sister and brother-in-law at Boston Mill on the San Pedro River 8 miles (13 km) southwest of Tombstone. On the day of the shoot out, she drove into Tombstone with her sister and stopped at the post office. While she waited in the buggy, she was an eyewitness to the confrontation.

According to Colyer, the Cowboys opened fire the moment the marshal called upon them to throw up their hands. She also said that one of the Cowboys was firing from under the neck of his horse which some interpreted to be Tom McLaury, who according to the Cowboys was unarmed. She said, "... the Cowboys opened fire on them, and you never saw such shooting. One of the Cowboys, after he had been shot three times, raised himself on his elbow and shot one of the officers and fell back dead. Another used his horse as a barricade and shot under his neck."

=== Anonymous threats ===
On December 30, 1881, the Weekly Arizona Miner newspaper published the following article:

For some time past, the Earps, Doc. Holliday, Tom Fitch and others who upheld and defended the Earps in their late trial, have received, almost daily, anonymous letters, warning them to leave town or suffer death, supposed to have been written by friend of the Clanton and McLowry boys, three of whom the Earps and Holliday killed, and little attention was paid to them, as they were believed to be idle boasts, but the shooting of Virgil Earp last night shows that the men are in earnest. Virgil Earp formerly lived in Prescott, and at one time was night-watchman. He left Prescott during the Tombstone excitement, and has since been a resident of that town.

=== Virgil Earp ambushed ===
Virgil Earp was ambushed and left maimed.

At about 11:30 pm on December 28, 1881, just over two months after the gunfight at the O.K. Corral, Virgil Earp was ambushed as he was returning from Schieffelin Hall back to the Cosmopolitan Hotel, where the Earps had moved for mutual support and protection. Three assailants on the second story of an unfinished building across Allen street from the hotel fired three loads of double-barreled buckshot from about 60 feet (18 m). Virgil was struck in the back and left arm by about 20 buckshot pellets, shattering his humerus. Dr. George E. Goodfellow removed 4 inches (10 cm) of shattered bone and was able to save Virgil's arm, but he carried it in a sling the rest of his life.

The next day Wyatt, believing that Virgil was dying, telegraphed Crawley Dake, U.S. Marshal for the Arizona Territory. He requested appointment as Deputy U.S. Marshal for eastern Pima County and asked for authority to form a posse:

VIRGIL EARP WAS SHOT BY CONCEALED ASSASSINS LAST NIGHT HIS WOUNDS ARE FATAL TELEGRAPH ME APPOINTMENT WITH POWER TO APPOINT DEPUTIES LOCAL AUTHORITIES ARE DOING NOTHING THE LIVES OF OTHER CITIZENS ARE THREATENED WYATT EARP

In late January, unable to obtain funds from his superiors, Dake went to San Francisco where he persuaded the Wells, Fargo & Co. to loan him $3000, assuring them that the Department of Justice would honor the loan. He apparently neglected to inform his superiors of his arrangement and was later investigated for financial improprieties. Some reports say he borrowed only $500.

On January 20, 1882, Dake deposited $2,985 into an account in Wyatt's name at Hudson & Company in Tombstone, and authorized Wyatt to employ a posse to track down the Cowboys. On January 25, Wyatt obtained warrants from Judge Stilwell for the arrest of Ike and Phin Clanton, and another Cowboy named Pony Diehl, for the attempted murder of Virgil. Wyatt and Morgan Earp, along with Doc Holliday, assembled a posse which turned Charleston inside out looking for the Cowboys without success.

Wyatt returned to Tombstone to find the men had already surrendered, though they thought it was for lesser charges. Clanton was later accused, along with his brother Phin Clanton and friend Pony Diehl, of attempting to kill Virgil Earp. Wyatt apparently used only a portion of the Wells Fargo funds, with a single withdrawal of $536.65 on record.

A week later, Wyatt tried to defuse the situation by offering Ike Clanton a truce, but Clanton would have no part in it. On February 2, Virgil and Wyatt resigned from their positions as Deputy U.S. Marshals in a letter published in The Daily Epitaph, though Dake refused Wyatt's resignation. Though Ike's hat was found at the scene where the ambushers waited, a number of associates stood up for him, saying that he had been in Contention that night, and the case against Ike, Phin and Pony Diehl was dismissed for lack of evidence.

On February 9, Ike Clanton filed murder charges yet again against the Earps, once again in Contention City. Behan escorted Wyatt and Morgan there, guarded by a phalanx of 12 heavily armed friends en route. Judge Smith refused to indict the Earps unless the Clantons could supply new evidence.

The Earps were pressed for cash. Virgil had been suspended from his job as town Marshal which paid him $150 a month. For increased security, the brothers and their wives had been living in town at the Cosmopolitan Hotel since the October 26 gunfight. The Wells Fargo funds only covered the costs of his posse. On February 13, Wyatt and Mattie took out a three-month note on their home, lots three and four of Block M near Fremont and First Streets, and James G. Howard loaned them $365.00 in gold coin (or about $12,177 in today's dollars). Wyatt was unable to pay the mortgage and Howard later foreclosed, claiming the property.

=== Morgan Earp assassinated ===
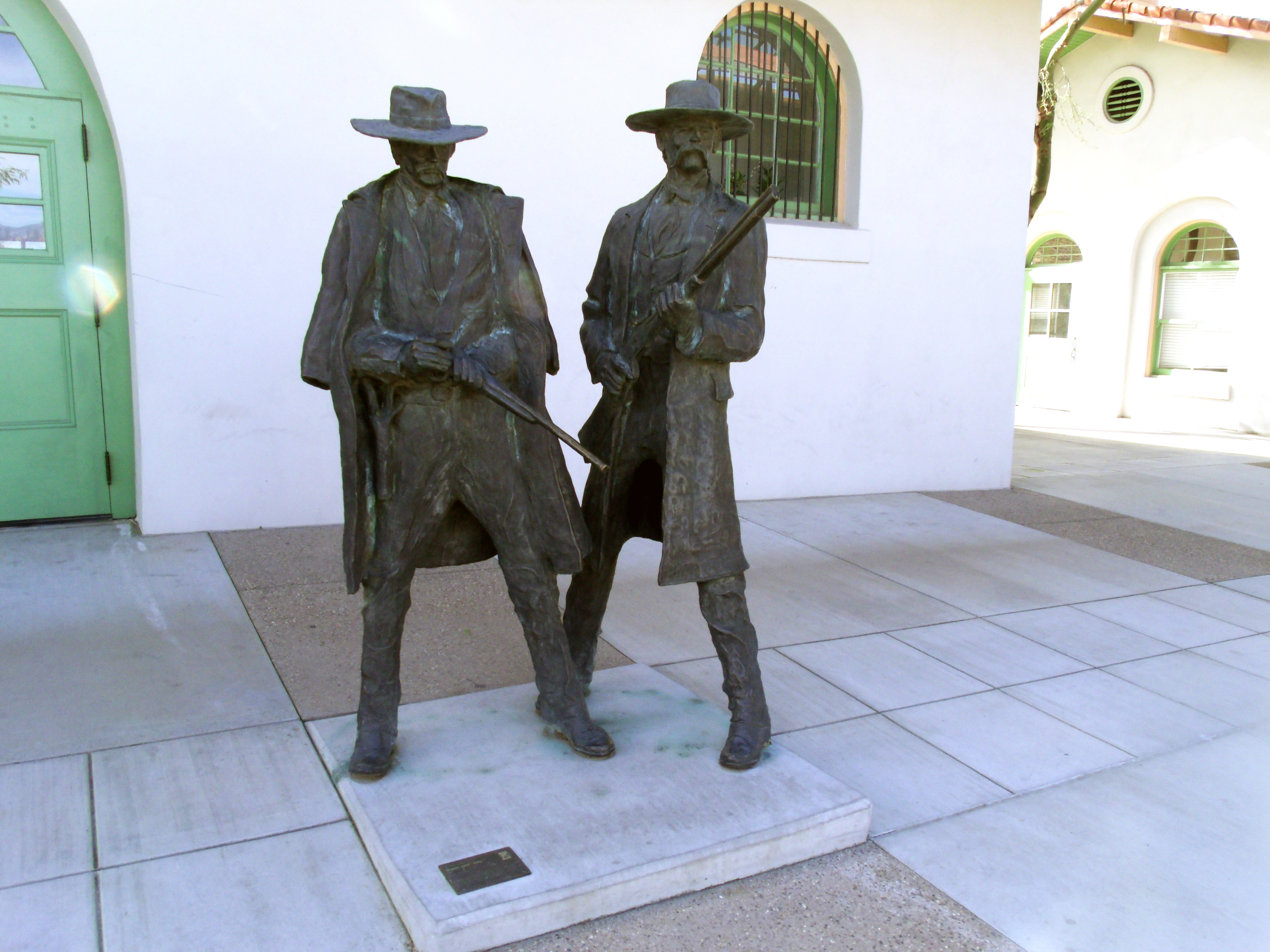
This is the location of the 1880s Tucson Depot. It was in this location where Frank Stilwell, suspected in the murder of Morgan Earp on March 18, 1882, was killed by Wyatt Earp in the company of Doc Holliday. The location is now part of the Amtrak Station which is located at 400 N. Toole Ave. in Tucson, Az..

On Saturday evening, March 18, 1882, Morgan, Doc Holliday, and Dan Tipton attended Stolen Kisses, a musical by William Horace Lingard and Company, at Schieffelin Hall. Wyatt, having received threats that same day, warned against going. Benjamin Goodrich cautioned them, "You fellows will catch it tonight if you don't look out," but the men went anyway. Afterwards, Doc went to his room and Morgan and Tipton headed for Hatch's Saloon and Billiard Parlor, which had become their unofficial headquarters after the Oriental Hotel was sold.

Morgan came upon Virgil's wife Allie while she was out shopping for her convalescing husband, and he escorted her back to the Cosmopolitan Hotel. He returned to the Campbell & Hatch Billiard Parlor and played a late round of billiards with owner Bob Hatch. Wyatt, Tipton, and Sherman McMaster watched them play at a pool table near the back door.

At 10:50 pm, Morgan Earp was waiting for Hatch to line up a shot when two bullets were fired through a glass-windowed, locked door which opened onto a dark alley between Allen and Fremont Streets. The first bullet struck Morgan in the right side. It shattered his spine, passed through his left side, and lodged in the thigh of mining foreman George A. B. Berry. A second bullet lodged near the ceiling over Wyatt's head. Morgan fell to the floor and Wyatt, McMaster, and Tipton moved him away from the outside door to the floor near the door of the card room. Hatch dashed outside looking for the shooters.

Dr. William Miller arrived first, followed by Drs. Matthews and George Goodfellow. They all examined Morgan. Even Goodfellow, recognized in the United States as the nation's leading expert at treating abdominal gunshot wounds, concluded that Morgan's wounds were fatal. They then moved Morgan to a lounge in an adjoining room where he died less than an hour after he was shot.

The next day, Sunday, March 19 (Wyatt's 34th birthday), he and brother James Earp and a group of friends took Morgan's body to the railroad station in Contention. After loading his remains onto the train, James and five close friends accompanied it to Colton, California. Morgan's wife was already in Colton, where she had traveled for safety before Morgan was killed. James and his guard arrived in Colton with Morgan's body on March 21.

During the coroner's inquest into Morgan's murder, Pete Spence's wife Marietta Duarte testified that her husband, Frank Stilwell, Frederick Bode, Florentino "Indian Charlie" Cruz, and an unnamed half-breed Indian had turned up at her home an hour after Morgan was killed and talked about shooting him. She said that Spence threatened violence if she told what she knew. The five men were named as suspects in Morgan Earp's murder and the coroner's jury issued warrants for their arrest. Spence turned himself in so that he would be protected in Behan's jail, but his attorney successfully blocked his wife's testimony. Lacking evidence, the prosecution withdrew its charges. Holliday said in 1882 that he thought Behan was behind the murder of Morgan Earp.

=== Frank Stilwell killed ===
On Monday, March 20, Deputy U.S. Marshal Wyatt Earp, James Earp, Warren Earp, Doc Holliday, "Turkey Creek" Jack Johnson, and Sherman McMaster guarded Virgil and Allie on the way to Tucson. James was to accompany Virgil, Allie, and Morgan's body to the family home in Colton, California. Morgan's wife and parents waited to bury him. Wyatt received information that Frank Stilwell, Ike Clanton, Hank Swilling, and another cowboy were waiting for them in Tucson. Upon their arrival in Tucson, the Earp party spotted Stilwell and other Cowboys. James, Virgil, and Allie boarded the train to Tucson armed with pistols, rifles and shotguns. Virgil said later that he had Allie wear his pistol belt where he could easily have access to the weapon if he should need it.

As the train pulled away from the Tucson station at about 7:15 p.m., six or seven shots were heard. Witnesses said they saw men running with weapons but could not identify anyone. Wyatt later told his biographers that he saw Frank Stilwell, and another man he believed to be Ike Clanton, armed with shotguns lying on a flatcar. When Wyatt and his men approached, the two men ran. Stilwell stumbled, allowing Wyatt to catch him. Wyatt later said he shot Stilwell as he attempted to push the barrel of Earp's shotgun away.

Stilwell's body was found the next day alongside the tracks riddled with buckshot and four other bullet wounds. His own pistol had not been fired. Tucson Justice of the Peace Charles Meyer issued arrest warrants for Wyatt and Warren Earp, Holliday, McMaster, and Johnson for the murder of Frank Stilwell.

=== Earps seek vengeance ===
Wyatt Earp felt he could not rely on the courts for justice and decided to take matters into his own hands. He concluded that only way to deal with Virgil's attackers and Morgan's murderers was to heed Spicer's advice and kill them.

During the next week Wyatt and his posse tracked down and killed Florentino "Indian Charlie" Cruz, Curly Bill Brocius, and Johnny Barnes, three of the men they believed were responsible for their brothers' ambush and murder. The ride for vengeance came to be called the Earp vendetta ride. Wyatt and Doc left the Arizona Territory for Colorado in April 1882 and parted company after a minor disagreement. Although they may have remained in contact, they never saw each other again.

Two years later, Will McLaury wrote a letter to his father in Iowa, cryptically stating: "And none of the results have been satisfactory. The only result is the death of Morgan and crippling of Virgil Earp and death of McMaster."

=== Participants' deaths ===
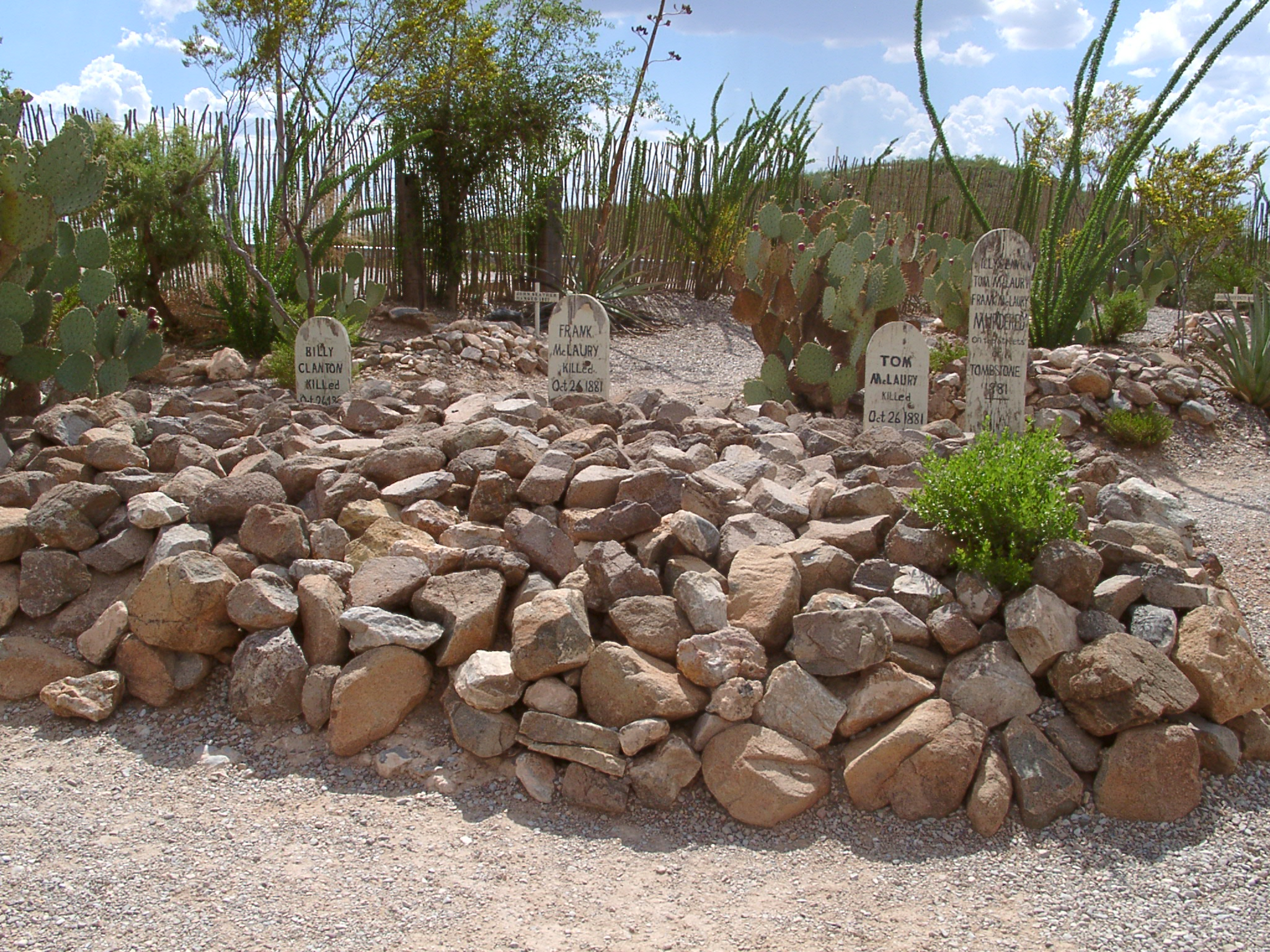
Billy Clanton, Frank McLaury and Tom McLaury are buried in Boot Hill Cemetery, Tombstone, Arizona. The McLaury brothers were buried side by side in the same grave. Billy Clanton was buried next to them, in a different grave.

Morgan Earp was killed by a shot in the back while playing billiards less than five months after the O.K. Corral fight. He was 30 years old. His brother James took Morgan's body to Colton, California, where Morgan's wife and parents buried him in the old city cemetery of Colton, near Mount Slover. When that cemetery was moved in 1892, Morgan's body was reburied in the Hermosa Cemetery in Colton.

Billy Claiborne was killed in an altercation outside the Oriental Saloon in Tombstone on November 14, 1882, by Franklyn Leslie. Leslie shot Claiborne in self-defense after Leslie refused Claiborne's drunken demands that he call him the new "Billy the Kid." Claiborne was 22 years old when he died. He was buried in Tombstone's Boothill Cemetery.

Ike Clanton was caught stealing cattle June 1, 1887, and shot dead by lawman Jonas V. Brighton while resisting arrest. He was about 40 years old. His body was reportedly left where it fell for several days until nearby Mormon ranchers buried him in an unmarked grave in a Mormon cemetery southeast of Eagar, Arizona, on what is today called "The 26 Bar Ranch".

Doc Holliday died of tuberculosis in Glenwood Springs, Colorado, November 8, 1887, at age 36, but Wyatt Earp did not learn of Holliday's death until several months later. Holliday was buried in the Linwood Cemetery overlooking Glenwood Springs.

Virgil Earp was ambushed on the streets of Tombstone on the evening of December 28, 1881, by hidden assailants shooting from the second story of an unfinished building. The wound left him without use of his left arm. Virgil left Tombstone for California after Morgan was killed. He served as the "Town Marshal," hired by the Southern Pacific Railroad, in Colton, California. He died of pneumonia in Goldfield, Nevada, at the age of 62 in 1905, still on the job as a peace officer. At the request of his long-lost daughter, Nellie Jane Bohn, Virgil's remains were buried in the River View Cemetery in Portland, Oregon.

Johnny Behan was not re-nominated by his own party for the sheriff race in 1882 and never again worked as a lawman. He spent the rest of his life at various government jobs and died in Tucson of natural causes at age 67, in 1912. Behan was buried in Tucson's Holy Hope Cemetery.

Wyatt Earp traveled across the western frontier from one boom town to another in the company of Josephine Marcus, working mostly as a gambler and miner, until they settled in Southern California. He was the last living participant of the gunfight when he died on January 13, 1929, at the age of 80 in Los Angeles of chronic cystitis. Josephine Earp, Wyatt's common-law wife, was of Jewish heritage. She had Earp's body cremated and secretly buried in the Marcus family plot at the Hills of Eternity, a Jewish cemetery in Colma, California. The location of his remains remained unknown to even Earp's closest living relative, George Earp, until about 1957 when the Tombstone Restoration Commission sought to have Wyatt's remains moved to Tombstone. Arthur King, a deputy to Earp from 1910 to 1912, revealed that Josephine had buried Wyatt's cremated remains in Colma, California, and the Tombstone Commission cancelled its plans to relocate his ashes.

=== Hearing transcripts ===
In April 2010, original transcripts of witness statements made during the preliminary hearing were rediscovered in an abandoned closet in county offices in Bisbee, Arizona, and the county said they would be preserved and digitized. Photocopies of these documents have been available to researchers since 1960, and new digitized records of the originals have been made available for online access. While the transcripts do not offer any significant deviations from generally accepted historical accounts of the gunfight itself, they were taken directly from eyewitnesses shortly afterwards and as such, they provide an interesting and unique perspective of the event.
