= Wes Fuller =

Wes Fuller may refer to:

- Wes Fuller, a witness at the O.K. Corral hearing and aftermath
- Wes Fuller, a character in Dominion (TV series), American television series
