= Committee of Safety =

Committee of Safety may refer to:

- Committee of Safety (England), the parliamentary body in England that oversaw the English Civil War
- Committee of safety (American Revolution), established throughout the Thirteen Colonies at the start of the American Revolutionary War
  - Augusta County Committee of Safety, one such Committee in Virginia
  - Rowan County Committee of Safety, drafted the Rowan Resolves
  - Tryon County Committee of Safety § New York, established in 1774
  - Tryon County Committee of Safety § North Carolina, issued the Tryon Resolves
- Committee of Public Safety, which controlled the French First Republic during the Reign of Terror
- Committee of Safety (Hawaii), the forerunner of the Provisional Government of Hawaii during the overthrow of the Hawaiian monarchy

== See also ==
- Committee of Public Safety (disambiguation)
- Vigilance committee
