= 3-7-77 =

Symbol associated with the Montana Vigilantes

Montana Highway Patrol patch

3-7-77 is a symbol originally used by the Montana Vigilantes, a 19th-century vigilance committee in Virginia City, Montana, United States.

== Historic examples ==
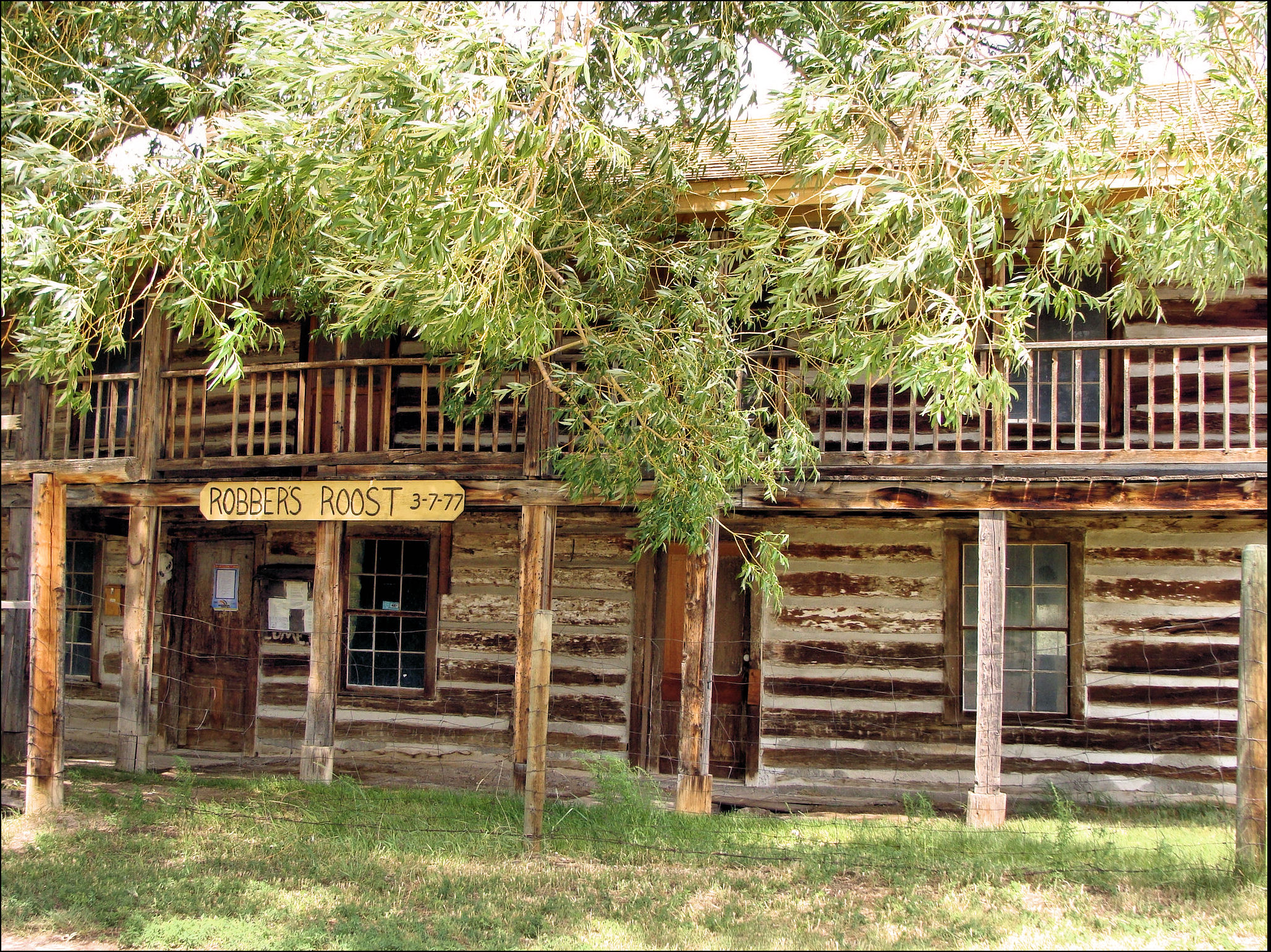
Robber's Roost in Madison County, Montana is listed on the National Register of Historic Places

When the numbers "3-7-77" were painted on a tent or cabin, it was a warning that the occupants could face vigilantism if they did not leave the area. In 1917, union organizer Frank Little was lynched, and a note pinned to his body read, "Others take notice, first and last warning, 3-7-77."

== Modern examples ==
The numbers are used on the shoulder patch of the Montana Highway Patrol. The Association of Montana Troopers website says the patch:

Is emblematic of the first organized law enforcement in Montana. The Montana Highway Patrol, in adopting this early symbol, honors the first men in the Montana Territory who organized for the safety and welfare of the people.

The symbol appears on the flight suits of pilots of the Montana Air National Guard, and the flight patch of the Montana Army National Guard Medevac unit 1189th GSAB – Vigilantes.

Some floats in the Vigilante Day Parade in Helena, Montana, display the numbers 3–7–77. The number also appears on the patch worn by sailors aboard the USS Montana (SSN 794) a Virginia class fast attack submarine.

== Origin ==
Theories regarding the origin and meaning of the symbol include:

- The numbers represent the date the Vigilante Oath was signed in Bannack, Montana, the first seat of Justice in the state. This claim is perpetuated by a supposed oath, dated March 7, 1877, that hangs on the wall of the Masonic Lodge 3-7-77 in Bannack.
- The numbers represent the dimensions of a grave, 3 feet by 7 feet by 77 inches.
- Frederick Allen, in his book A Decent Orderly Lynching, says the number meant the person had to buy a $3 ticket on the next 7:00 a.m. stagecoach to take the 77-mile trip from Helena to Butte.
- In The Wasted Vigil, author Nadeem Aslam says the number means you have three hours, seven minutes and seventy-seven seconds to get out or face violence.
- The number set may have something to do with the date March 7, 1877. The first documented evidence of use of the symbol in a vigilante scenario occurred in November 1879 in Helena when it was mentioned in a newspaper article. A 1914 dissertation noted that it was simply used as part of a meeting notice. The first Masonic meeting in Bannack, Montana is sometimes said to have taken place on March 7, 1877, but there is no historic evidence for this claim. The same source (the Bannack State Park Guide) also claims that in 1874, realizing the need for a school, the Bannack Masonic Lodge 16 built a combination lodge building and school. However, this would mean that the first Masonic meeting in Bannack was held well before March 7, 1877. The Bannack Masons actually applied for a charter for a Masonic Lodge in 1863. Bannack Lodge 16 was chartered in 1871, and remained open until 1921, when it consolidated with the Dillon Masonic Lodge. Hence, the date theory does not stand. In 2000 Bannack Historic Lodge 3-7-77 was organized through the Grand Lodge of Montana.
