= Montana Highway Patrol =

American highway patrol agency

- Patch of Montana Highway Patrol
- Abbreviation: MHP

Agency overview
- Formed: 1935; 91 years ago
- Employees: 294 (as of 2014)

Jurisdictional structure
- Operations jurisdiction: Montana, United States
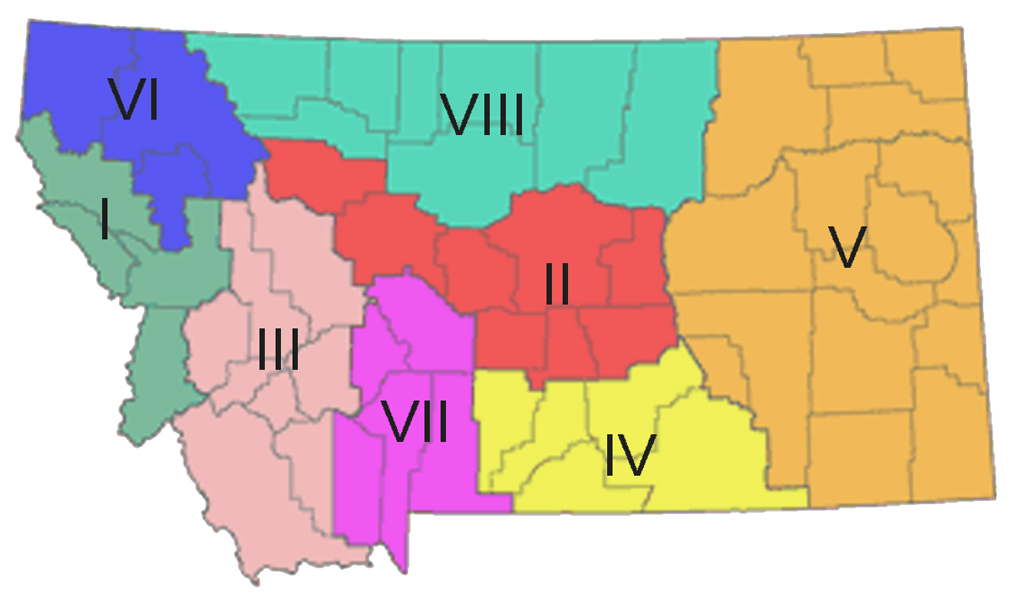
- Montana Highway Patrol Districts
- Area: 147,165 square miles (381,160 km^{2})
- Population: 1,132,812 (July 2023 estimate)
- General nature: Civilian police

Operational structure
- Headquarters: Boulder, Montana
- Troopers: 243 (authorized, as of 2023)
- Civilians: 57 (as of 2014)
- Agency executive: Colonel Kurt Sager, Chief Administrator
- Parent agency: Montana Department of Justice

Facilities
- Stations: 7 Districts and 1 Headquarters

Website
- Montana Highway Patrol site

The Montana Highway Patrol (MHP) is the highway patrol agency for the U.S. state of Montana, for which it has statewide jurisdiction. It is one of Montana's two primary state-level law enforcement agencies, the other being the Criminal Investigations Bureau of the Montana Department of Justice.

== History ==
The Montana Highway Patrol was founded in 1935 after Montana led the nation with a 74% increase in highway fatalities. Twenty-four recruits taken from an application pool of over 1500 were selected to attend the first Highway Patrol Recruit Academy, and on May 1, 1935 those recruits took to the highways. Though authorized to enforce the eleven traffic laws in existence at that time, the Montana Highway Patrol's main focus was to educate and assist the public. The MHP was originally part of the office of the Governor of Montana, with the governor being the supreme commander of the Highway Patrol.

In 1943 the Safety and Education Division was formed, which charged Uniformed Highway Patrol officers with educating the public about highway traffic safety.

In 1946, Officer Bob Steele became the first Montana Highway Patrol officer to be killed in the line of duty. He was shot and killed in a gunfight with two suspects in an armed robbery, Officer Gordon McDermid was also injured in the incident. Following this, all patrol cars were equipped with shotguns.

In 1948, the Driver License Bureau was created, with Highway Patrol officers being responsible for administering driving tests.

In 1954, Officer James Anderson was the second Highway Patrolman to be killed in the line of duty, he was struck and killed by a passing vehicle on the shoulder of a road, making him the first officer killed in a traffic accident. In 1956, Chief Alex B. Stephenson ordered the numbers 3-7-77 to be added to the agency's shoulder patch. This was the symbol of the Montana Vigilantes, the first law enforcement group to operate in the Montana Territory, the numbers represent the date the oath was signed that made them a formal law enforcement agency: March 7, 1877.

In 1972 Montana experienced its highest number of traffic fatalities to date. The Montana State Legislature reorganized the Highway Patrol as a bureau within the Montana Department of Justice, and authorized additional positions, bringing the number of sworn officers up to 220. In 1973, the Accident Prevention Unit was created after Richard Hedstrom became the third Highway Patrolman killed in the line of duty. Patrolman Hedstrom had stopped to render assistance to someone injured in a vehicle crash when he was struck by a passing vehicle, he had only been on the job for 19 days. An award was established in Hedstrom's name, and is awarded to officers who have attempted life saving efforts.

In 1978, the first four female officers joined the Highway Patrol. On April 8, 1978 Patrolman Michael Ren became the fourth patrolman killed in the line of duty. He was shot and killed near Eureka while attempting to make an arrest.

In 1979, the Driver License Bureau was moved from the Highway Patrol to the Motor Vehicle Division, with civilian employees taking over the responsibility of administering driving tests. In 1984 the Motor Carrier Safety Assistance Program (MCSAP) was created within the Highway Patrol as the Motor Vehicle Inspection Bureau, with the Highway Patrol being responsible for performing Motor Vehicle Inspections on semi trucks and other commercial vehicles.

In 1987, the Montana Legislature passed Montana's first seat belt law. The Montana Highway Patrol was tasked with educating the public about the benefits of wearing seat belts, and working closely with county sheriff's and local law enforcement to enforce these new laws. This was credited with greatly reducing the number of traffic fatalities in the state.

In 1988, the Highway Patrol became the first state highway patrol in the nation to become nationally accredited. The accreditation process took three years to complete and was considered a critical element in enhancing the professionalism of the Montana Highway Patrol.

The Montana Highway Patrol currently have four specialty units that Troopers can be assigned to. They are:

• Executive Protection (EP)

• Special Response Team (SRT)

• Criminal Interdiction Team (CIT)

• Strategic Enforcement Traffic Team (SETT)

The Montana Highway Patrol also operates an aviation divisions, which includes helicopter pilots and drone pilots.

Since the 2010s there has been an interest by some in Montana to restructure the Montana Highway Patrol into a State Police Agency; however, this has met with a lot of resistance and pushback from the majority of citizens.

In August 2025, Troopers of the Montana Highway Patrol SRT assigned to the United States Marshals Service Fugitive Task Force, played an intricate role in locating, and apprehending the accused shooter of the 2025 Anaconda shooting, which had left 4 people dead.

== Organization ==
The Montana Highway Patrol is divided into eight districts.

=== Districts ===
There are seven districts that the MHP operates in throughout the state.

District I (Missoula) – Mineral, Missoula, Ravalli, and Sanders counties

District II (Great Falls) – Cascade, Fergus, Judith Basin, Petroleum, Teton, Wheatland, Blaine, Chouteau, Glacier, Hill, Liberty, Phillips, Pondera, and Toole counties

District III (Butte) – Beaverhead, Deer Lodge, Granite, Jefferson, Lewis & Clark, Madison, Powell, and Silver Bow counties

District IV (Billings) – Big Horn, Carbon, Stillwater, Musselshell, Golden Valley, and Yellowstone counties

District V (Glendive) – Carter, Custer, Daniels, Dawson, Fallon, Garfield, McCone, Powder River, Prairie, Richland, Roosevelt, Rosebud, Sheridan, Treasure, Valley, and Wibaux counties

District VI (Kalispell) – Flathead, Lake, and Lincoln counties

District VII (Bozeman) – Broadwater, Gallatin, Madison, Meagher, Sweet Grass, and Park counties

== Mission ==
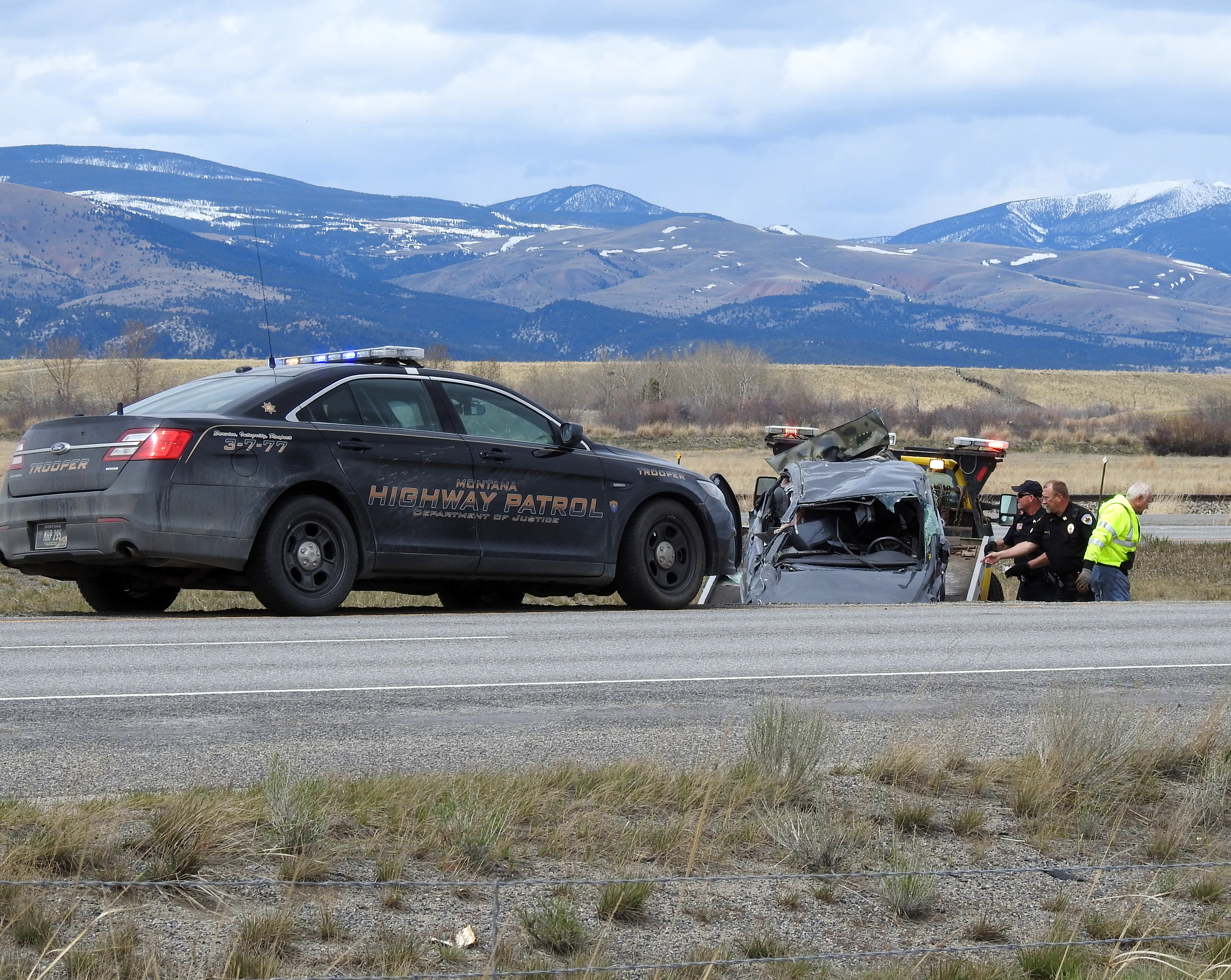
A Ford Taurus Police Interceptor of the MHP on scene of a rollover accident

The Highway Patrol's mission is to safeguard the lives and property of the people using the highway traffic system of Montana through education, service, enforcement, and interagency cooperation.

The Patrol's 243 State Troopers cover great distances to police Montana's highways, assist other law enforcement agencies, and help motorists in need. Each year, the men and women of the Patrol:

- drive more than 5,500,000 miles (8,900,000 km)
- respond to over 70,000 calls for service
- issue more than 85,000 arrest tickets and more than 100,000 warning tickets

Troopers provide public safety education presentations on nearly every subject related to driving safety, including seatbelt use, driving under the influence (DUI), and child safety.

There is currently a misconception that the Montana Highway Patrol can only enforce traffic laws on highways; however, the Patrol has state wide jurisdiction with the authority to enforce all state criminal, traffic, commercial, and/or wildlife laws.

== Weapons ==
The Montana Highway Patrol uses a variety of lethal and less-lethal weapons. The weapons that are in use by the department are as follows:

- S&W M&P 2.0 4.25” 9x19mm (standard-issue sidearm as of 2025)
- SIG P229 .357 SIG (former sidearm)
- Beretta 1301 Tactical (shotgun & less lethal shotgun)
- Rock River Arms M4 carbine style AR-15 (former patrol rifle)
- Military surplus M14 rifles (for cadet training & emergency stockpile)
- S&W M&P 15 Radian Raptor LE SBR 11.5" 5.56x45mm (current patrol rifle as of 2025) with a Gemtech Abyss suppressor
- OC (oleoresin capsicum) Pepper Spray
- Taser X2

== Fallen officers ==
Since the establishment of the Montana Highway Patrol in 1935, eight officers have died while on duty.

== See also ==
- 3-7-77
- List of law enforcement agencies in Montana
- State police
- State patrol
- Highway patrol
