= Anna M. Fitch =

American writer

Anna Fitch
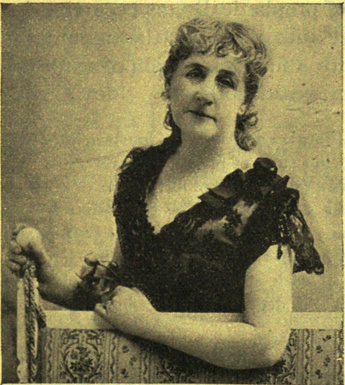
- Fitch in an 1893 publication
- Born: Anna Mariska (or Marizba) Corry (or Cory); March 1840; Shoreham, Vermont, United States
- Died: 15 April 1904 (aged 64); Los Angeles, California, United States
- Occupations: writer; editor
- Spouses: John Schultz (or Shultz); Thomas Fitch (m. 1863)
- Writing career
- Pen name: Anna Guesner; Anna Kluesner; Marisa A. Guesner
- Genres: novels; poems; dramas

Anna M. Fitch (née Corry or Cory; after first marriage, Schultz or Shultz; after second marriage, Fitch; March 1840 – 15 April 1904) was an American writer. She was among the first Californian women to produce a novel. Her many pen names included: Anna Guesner, Anna Kluesner, and Marisa A. Guesner. It was said that she helped her second husband, Thomas Fitch, the politician and orator, to write his speeches and that he helped her to write her poems.

== Early life ==
Anna Mariska (or Marizba) Corry (or Cory) was born in Shoreham, Vermont in March 1840. Her parents were Caleb Corry and Eliza (née Turner). She had five siblings - James, Elizabeth, William, Janet and Charles.

She was a ward of Gen. Edward Baker.

== Career ==
Fitch was connected with The Hesperian in its early days. Extracts from an unpublished poem, "Persia", were contributed to the San Franciscan. Nearly ten years later, this same poem, completed, was issued by Putnam in New York City, under the title of The Loves of Paul Fenly. During the time that Fitch served as the editor of the "Ladies' and Home Department" in the Occidental, Mark Twain commented:— "We expected great things of the Occidental. Of course it could not get along without an original novel, and so we made arrangements to hurl into the work the full strength of the company. Mrs. F(itch) was an able romancist of the ineffable school – I know no other name to apply to a school whose heroes are all dainty and all perfect. She wrote the opening chapter".

In 1871, she became one of the first women in California to publish a novel; it was titled Bound Down. In 1874, she published a play, Items: A Washington Society Play. Better Days or a Millionaire of To-morrow, published in 1891, was co-authored by Fitch with her second husband, Thomas.

== Personal life ==
Anna married twice. Her first husband was John Schultz, a miner. She met her second husband, Thomas Fitch, in Placerville, California, where they married in 1863. she married the politician and orator, Thomas Fitch. While Thomas served as a Congressman (1869–71), the couple lived in Washington, D.C. where Mrs. Fitch was associated with Harriet Stanwood Blaine (Mrs. James G. Blaine), Sara Jane Lippincott ("Grace Greenwood"), Matilda Lindsay Stephens (Mrs. Gen. Alexander H. Stephens), and Elizabeth Evans Rhodes Townsend (Mrs. George Alfred Townsend).

By 1881, Fitch had crossed the U.S. thirty-six times by stage or railroad, besides an ocean voyage between New York City and San Francisco.

In later life, Fitch and her husband were associated with Samuel L. Clemens ("Mark Twain,") Joaquin Miller, Rollin M. Daggett, Minister to the Hawalian Islands, and John Shertzer Hittell, of San Francisco. In poor health for several years, since 1901, Fitch and her husband lived most of the time in the Hawaiian Islands. They came to Los Angeles, California in November 1903, where she died on April 15, 1904, of Bright's disease brought on by typhoid.

== Selected works ==
- Better Days: or, A Millionaire of To-morrow, 1891, with Thomas Fitch (text)
- Bound Down: Or Life and Its Possibilities, 1870 (text)
- Items: A Washington Society Play, 1874
- The Loves of Paul Fenly, 1893 (text)
