= Wells Spicer =

American judge (1831–1885 or 1887)

Wells W. Spicer
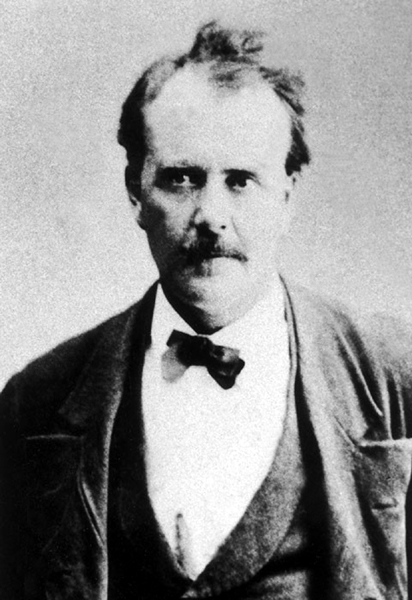
- Cropped from a group photo of John D. Lee's defense team in 1875
- Born: 1831; Chemung, New York
- Died: 1885 or 1887 possibly Ajo, Pima County, Arizona, Arizona
- Occupations: Justice of the Peace, journalist, prospector, lawyer, politician

Wells W. Spicer (1831–1885 or 1887) was an American journalist, prospector, politician, lawyer and judge whose legal career immersed him in two significant events in frontier history: the Mountain Meadows massacre in the Utah Territory in 1857; and the 1881 shootout commonly known as the Gunfight at the O.K. Corral in Tombstone, Arizona Territory. After he left Tombstone, he returned to prospecting. He disappeared in 1885 or 1887.

== Early life ==
Spicer was born in Chemung, New York to William and Seba Spicer, both farmers of Presbyterian faith. He had two siblings: an older brother, George; and a younger sister, also named Seba. The family relocated to Tipton, Iowa when Wells was about nine years old. As a young man, Spicer worked as a clerk for Samuel Augustus Bissell, a respected lawyer and judge. Under Bissell's tutelage, Spicer was admitted to the Iowa bar in 1853. In the same year, Spicer and his associates began publishing the Cedar County Advertiser; Spicer became the sole publisher and editor the following year, eventually selling his successful newspaper four years later. After unsuccessfully running as a Democrat for county prosecutor in 1854, Spicer became a Republican and won the race for county judge in 1856. In July of the same year, Spicer married Abbie Gilbert and had a son, Earnest, a year later. Abbie and Wells separated in 1876, although Wells considered himself still married years later.

== Utah Territory ==
After living in Onandaeg City, Colorado, briefly, Spicer left his family in Tipton and went to the Utah Territory with his former fellow publisher, Charles Swetland in 1869. They settled in Corinne City. Spicer was admitted to the Utah bar and specialized in mining suits and claims, and he started a hotel in Corrine City. Swetland died shortly thereafter, but Spicer was joined by Abbie and Earnest around the same time. Spicer and his family moved to Ophir City in 1871 and began similar legal activity as well as prospecting and starting a tunneling company. Spicer continued his journalistic efforts, contributing to the Salt Lake Daily Tribune and Utah Mining Gazette. When Ophir's silver veins began to dry out, the Spicers moved to Salt Lake City in 1872. There Spicer was appointed U.S. Commissioner by the Supreme Court, hearing cases mostly in Bingham. In 1874 Spicer leased Rollins Mine, a defunct lead mine, in the Lincoln Mining District 18 miles west of Beaver near Minersville. After striking a profitable vein of lead and gold, the area was revitalized. It was through his connections in Beaver that Spicer was involved in one of Utah's darkest events.

=== John D. Lee and the Mountain Meadows Massacre ===
In November 1874, Sheriff William Stokes of Beaver arrested John D. Lee in Panguitch, less than 50 miles away, and jailed him near Beaver. Lee was one of eight men with arrest warrants for the murders at Mountain Meadows. It's not known how Spicer and Lee were introduced, but Lee would retain Spicer's services despite his initial wishes to represent himself. Spicer advised Lee to make a full confession, but Lee did not wish to implicate members of the Mormon hierarchy. Spicer assembled a legal team that consisted of Enos D. Hoge and William W. Bishop with eyewitness John McFarlane as an assistant (the team of George Bates and Jabez Sutherland was there more to protect the LDS Church than to defend Lee). Lee's trial began in late July 1875. After the prosecution spent several days detailing the "lurid and horrible details" of the massacre, Spicer presented his opening argument by spending 3 hours detailing other possible theories: that the Indians were solely responsible and Lee tried to save the doomed families; that the marauders were blind followers of the LDS church under orders from church leaders; or that the victims were reckless and "had no regard for property or person", behavior which served to anger the Indians. Spicer concentrated on the theory of religious fanaticism. Despite Spicer's tactics, no Mormons testified against Lee. The result was a hung jury with eight Mormons voting for acquittal and four Gentiles opting for a guilty verdict. Spicer now found himself ostracized: by non-Mormons who felt he became "the most complete jack Mormon" by defending Lee; and by Mormons who were incensed by his defense strategies. Both sides were openly critical of him in their respective newspapers, often referring to him simply as "One Spicer".

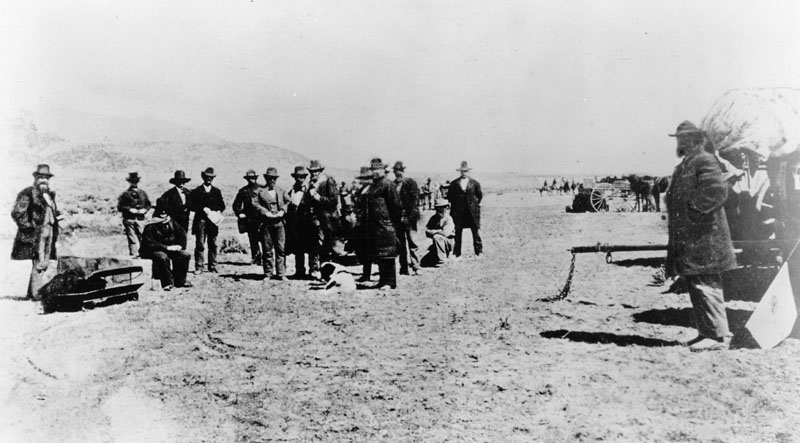
The bizarre scene at Lee's execution. Lee is seated, next to his coffin.

Lee's silence was unrewarded; it was also his undoing. Church elders struck a deal with the prosecutor from the U.S. Attorney's office, who initiated a second trial and populated the jury with Mormons who would "exonerate Mormon authorities of complicity in the massacre". Charges against other church leaders were dropped. Despite defense claims that prosecution witnesses were also willing participants in the massacre as well as glaring inconsistencies in their testimonies, Lee was found guilty in September 1876 and sentenced to death. Spicer and Bishop appealed the conviction, which was upheld by the Supreme Court. Spicer requested clemency from Gov. George W. Emery, who denied it due to Lee's reluctance to make a full public confession. Spicer attended Lee's execution by firing squad on March 22, 1877. The unsettling trials and aftermath inspired Spicer to refer to himself as the "unkilled of Mountain Meadows".

Spicer was renamed U.S. Commissioner for Utah Territory by the Supreme Court in 1876. He remained in Utah until the end of his commission in 1878. Discouraged by the recent turn of events, Spicer left for southeastern Arizona Territory when he learned of a silver strike in Tombstone, Arizona.

== Tombstone, Arizona Territory ==
The first verifiable evidence of Spicer's presence in Tombstone was his appointment as a special correspondent for the Arizona Daily Star on January 3, 1880, though earlier articles bearing the names of "Utah" and "W.S." may well have been Spicer's. As in his Utah days, Spicer's articles dealt mainly in the area of mining. He resumed his other mining activities, such as prospecting and practicing mining law. A previous acquaintance, Charles G.W. French, was named Chief Justice of Arizona by President Ulysses S. Grant and in turn named Spicer a justice of the First District Court in June 1880.

Spicer was the first Master of King Solomon Masonic Lodge#5, founded in Tombstone on March 14, 1881.

=== Gunfight at the O.K. Corral ===
A coroner's inquest was held the day after the gun fight of October 26, 1881. The coroner's jury only stated the facts of the gunfight and not whether the shootings were justifiable or criminal. Ike Clanton filed first degree murder charges on November 1 against Wyatt, Virgil, and Morgan Earp, and John H. "Doc" Holliday. A preliminary hearing, later nicknamed the Spicer Hearing, began on November 1, presided over by Justice of the Peace Spicer. The purpose of the hearings was to ascertain if enough evidence was present to warrant holding the defendant(s) for trial. But both the prosecution and the defense presented their entire cases as if the hearing was a full trial. The prosecution may have been motivated by the fact that it was common for criminal charges to be quickly dismissed during preliminary hearings if the evidence was not sufficient. Defense attorney Tom Fitch may have mounted a full-on defense because he knew of Spicer's experience while defending the Mountain Meadows Massacre, and they knew as a Republican he likely shared the Earps' antipathy towards the lawless elements. Fitch may have been concerned that the Earps and Holliday would probably face a pro-Democratic, pro-Cowboy jury in a full trial. Both sides had reason because witnesses would often disappear due to the transient—and sometimes deadly—nature of frontier life.

While fairly even-handed during the hearing, Spicer made at least two decisions that benefited the defense. The first allowed Wyatt Earp to testify by reading from a prepared statement without being cross-examined. Territory law allowed a defendant to make a narrative statement instead of the customary question/answer procedure with no cross-examination, but the law was vague as to whether the defendant could read from a written statement verbatim. The prosecution objected, but Spicer ruled that the "statute was very broad…(Earp) could make any statement he pleased whether previously prepared or not." Spicer's second key decision was to personally interview witness Addie Borland at her home after she presented confusing testimony and to recall her to the stand to answer his questions, much to the dismay and objections of the prosecution. In her second visit to Spicer's courtroom, she testified that she did not see any of the Cowboy faction raise their hands to surrender, testimony which contradicted the testimony of prosecution witnesses Ike Clanton, Wes Fuller and Billy Claiborne.

Spicer made his decision on November 30. While he criticized Virgil Earp's decision to call upon his brother Wyatt and Doc Holliday as "an injudicious and censurable act", he nonetheless could "attach no criminality to (Virgil's) unwise act". Spicer went on to give a lengthy dissertation as to how he came to his decision. By the time he was done, the Earps and Holliday were free from a full trial despite Ike Clanton's efforts to try them again in nearby Contention City. The grand jury accepted Spicer's ruling and refused to indict Holliday and the Earps.

Spicer was again newspaper fodder. The Democrat-leaning Tombstone Nugget stated that "in the eyes of many (Spicer) does not stand like Caesar's wife 'not only virtuous but above suspicion'". The newspaper to which Spicer once contributed, the Arizona Daily Star, said that he "was guilty of culpable ignorance of his duty or was afraid to perform the same, or acted improperly in discharging them". Death threats were leveled against several men, including Mayor John Clum, Wells, Fargo & Co. agent Marshall Williams, and defense attorney Tom Fitch. Judge Spicer received the following threat:

Sir, if you take my advice you will take your departure for a more genial clime, as I don't think this One Healthy for you much longer. As you are liable to get a hole through your coat at any moment. If such sons of Bitches as you are allowed to dispense Justice in this Territory, the Sooner you Depart from us the better for you And the community at large you may make light of this But it is only a matter of time you will get it sooner or later So with those gentle hints I Will Conclude for the first and last time.

Spicer, in characteristic fashion, wrote a lengthy retort in The Tombstone Epitaph, in which he wrote:

I have been reviled and slandered beyond measure, and that every vile epithet that a foul mouth could utter has been spoken of me... that of corruption and bribery. It is but just to myself that I should hereby assert that neither directly or indirectly was I ever approached in the interest of the defendants, nor have I received a favor of any kind from them or for them. There is a rabble in our city who would like to be thugs if they had courage; would be proud to be called cow-boys, if people gave them that distinction; but as they can be neither, they do the best they can to show how vile they are, and slander, abuse, and threaten everybody they date to. In conclusion, I will say that I will be here just where they can find me if they want me.

== Disappearance ==
Spicer returned to prospecting, first in Pima County, Arizona, then in Ures, Sonora, Mexico. A silver strike was made in the Quijotoa Mountains near Tucson. Spicer put all of his resources into a mine at Quijotoa, but the veins were not deep enough. It is widely believed that a destitute Spicer wandered into the Arizona desert in January 1887 and took his own life. An article 3 months later in the Daily Star stated that shortly before his disappearance while en route to Covered Wells, Spicer visited a man named Bill Haynes and tried to commit suicide twice while there.

One theory is that Spicer, who had a history of evading creditors, planned his "suicide" by pretending to be despondent while at Haynes' cabin and then quietly made his way to Mexico (possibly Ures) where he spent the rest of his days. Another modern historian reports that his body was found in Ajo, Arizona in 1885.

== Portrayals in film/television ==
- John Lawlor in Wyatt Earp (1994) imdb.com
- James Seay in The Life and Times of Wyatt Earp (Episode titled "Gunfight at the O.K. Corral", 1961) imdb.com
- William Schallert (as Judge Herman Spicer) in Hour of the Gun (1967) imdb.com
