= Anti-Fascist Committee =

Anti-Fascist Committee may refer to:

- Jewish Anti-Fascist Committee
- Finnish Anti-Fascist Committee
- Anti-Fascist Committee of Cham Immigrants
- Estonian Anti-Fascist Committee
- Anti-Fascist Committee of the Soviet Youth
- Anti-Fascist Committee of National Liberation for Northern Italy
- Anti-Racist/Anti-Fascist Co-ordinating Committee
