= Thomas Fitch (politician) =

American lawyer and politician (1838–1923)

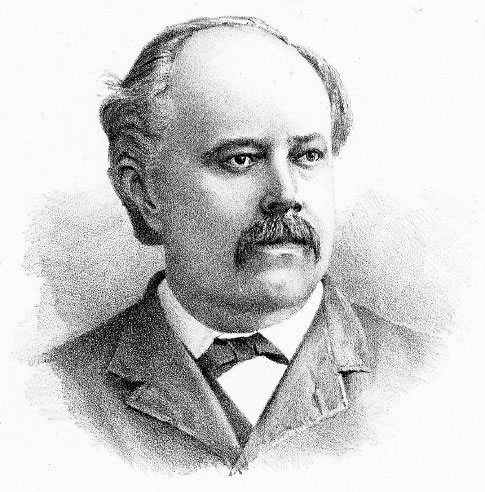

Member of the California State Assembly from the 15th district
- In office 1862–1863

Delegate to the Nevada Constitutional Convention
- In office July 4, 1864 – July 28, 1864

Washoe County District Attorney
- In office 1865–1866

Member of the U.S. House of Representatives from Nevada's at-Large district
- In office March 4, 1869 – March 3, 1871
- Preceded by: Delos R. Ashley
- Succeeded by: Charles West Kendall

Delegate to the Utah Constitutional Convention
- In office February 19, 1872 – March 2, 1872

Delegate to the United States Senate from the Utah Territory
- In office March 18, 1872 – 1872

Arizona Territorial Legislature
- In office 1879–1879

Personal details
- Born: January 27, 1838 New York City, US
- Died: November 12, 1923 (aged 85) Decoto, California, US
- Resting place: Chapel of the Chimes Memorial Park, Hayward, California
- Party: Republican
- Spouse: Annie M. Shultz
- Profession: U.S. Congressional Representative; lawyer; writer and newspaper editor; district attorney
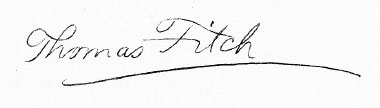
- Signature

Thomas Fitch (January 27, 1838 – November 12, 1923) was an American lawyer and politician. He defended President Brigham Young of the Church of Jesus Christ of Latter-day Saints and other church leaders when Young and his denomination were prosecuted for polygamy in 1871 and 1872. He also successfully defended Virgil, Morgan and Wyatt Earp along with Doc Holliday when they were accused of murdering Billy Clanton, Tom and Frank McLaury during the Gunfight at the O.K. Corral on October 26, 1881.

Fitch wrote for and edited a number of newspapers during his life and served in multiple political offices. He was a stout Republican and campaigned for Abraham Lincoln across Nevada. He developed a reputation as a capable lawyer and a terrific speaker and was nicknamed the "silver-tongued orator of the Pacific." He was a member of the California State Assembly in 1862 and 1863. In 1864, he was living in Virginia City, Nevada, where he edited the Virginia Daily Union. He became friends with Mark Twain who credited him with improving his writing. Fitch was a delegate to the Nevada state constitutional convention and also served as a member of the Utah state constitutional convention. He was a member of the Arizona Territorial Legislature in 1879.

He witnessed the laying of the first rail at the western terminus of the Overland Route in Sacramento and the last one at Promontory Point in Utah. He practiced law, mostly in Nevada, Utah, and Arizona, moving frequently during his life among these states. He also briefly practiced law in Minnesota and New York. According to one obituary he was one of "the three great orators who kept California loyal to the Union during the Civil War".

== Family life ==
Fitch was born in New York City on January 27, 1838. His father Thomas was a merchant and he attended public schools. His family had lived in New England for six or seven generations. One of his ancestors, Sir Thomas Fitch, was Governor of Connecticut when it was a colony. At age ten years he "made the struggle of life alone," "when a young man" and until the age of 21 "was engaged in merchandising."

Thomas married three times. He married his first wife Mary H Wainright in 1858 in San Francisco, California. They had two sons, Francis born 1859 and Thomas born 1862. Mary died giving birth to Thomas. His second wife was Anna Mariska née Corey. They married in 1863 in San Francisco, California. Anna died in 1904 in Los Angeles California. His third wife was Serena (Rena) Fitch née Dodds. They married on March 28, 1905 in San Bernardino, California.

== Move west ==
He moved to Chicago, Illinois, in 1855, and then to Milwaukee, Wisconsin, in 1856, where he started work as a clerk. In 1859, he found a job as local editor for the Milwaukee Free Democrat where he worked for one year before moving to San Francisco, California, in the summer of 1860.

Upon arriving in San Francisco, he campaigned across the state for the election of Abraham Lincoln and Hannibal Hamlin for U.S. President and U.S. Vice President "with telling effect".

He wrote for the San Francisco Gazette and became editor of the Times. While in San Francisco he married his second wife Anna Mariska Shultz in 1863. He read law at the firm of Shafter, Heydenfeld & Gould in San Francisco.

In 1862, he moved to the California foothills and El Dorado County, where he wrote for the Placerville Republican. He was elected to the California State Assembly as the representative for the 15th District in 1862 and 1863.

== Association with Mark Twain ==
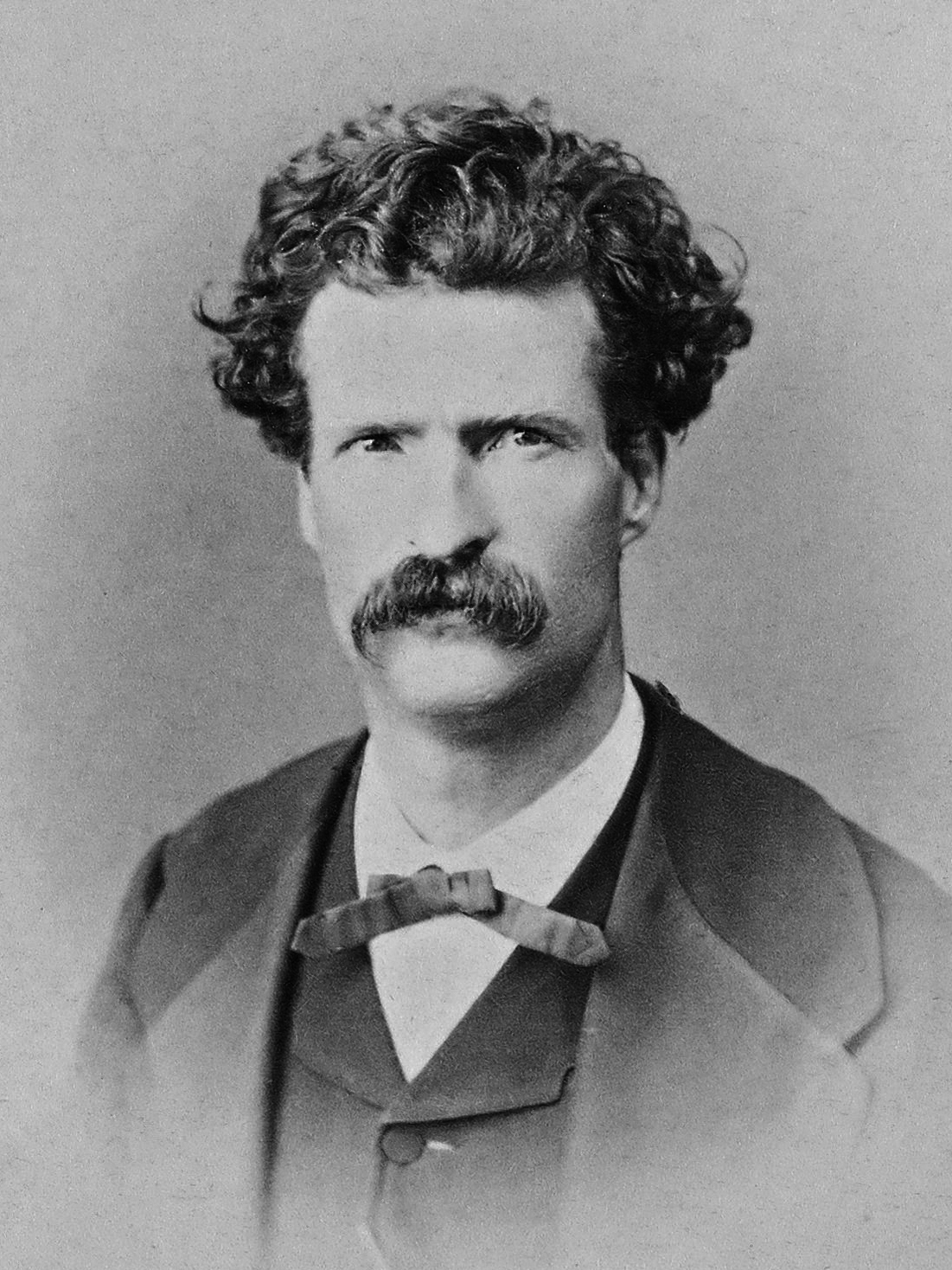
Twain in 1867

In 1863 he went to Nevada where he was named editor of the Virginia Daily Union. On August 1, 1863, Samuel Clemens (who also wrote under the nom de plume of "Mark Twain") was writing for the Virginia City newspaper, the Territorial Enterprise, and reported that Fitch had challenged Joseph T. Goodman, the editor of the competing newspaper, the Enterprise, to a duel. Goodman wrote an insulting article about Fitch, and Fitch impulsively challenged Goodman to a duel. Goodman had not written the article, but stood behind it and accepted the challenge. Before the duel commenced, Goodman learned that Fitch was unfamiliar with guns and at the first shot, deliberately wounded Fitch below the knee. Goodman instantly ran to Fitch's side and apologized, and insisted on taking care of Fitch until he healed. The two men became friends.

Clemens reported the duel differently: "They went out to fight this morning, with navy revolvers, at fifteen paces. The police interfered and prevented the duel." Fitch, his wife, sister-in-law, and mother-in-law occupied a suite of rooms across the hall from Clemens and Dan DeQuille in the Dagget Building in Virginia City. Fitch started his own eight-page weekly literary journal, The Weekly Occidental, in which Clemens was very interested. Fitch planned to publish a novel in serial form, with successive weekly chapters contributed by Fitch, his wife Anna, J. T. Goodman, Dan De Quille, Rollin M. Daggett and Clemens. The Occidental was published from October 29, 1864, until April 15, 1865, but ceased publication before Twain could contribute.

Clemens credited Fitch with giving him his "first really profitable lesson" in writing. In 1866, Clemens presented his lecture on the Sandwich Islands to a crowd in Washoe City. Clemens commented that, "When I first began to lecture, and in my earlier writings, my sole idea was to make comic capital out of everything I saw and heard." Fitch told him, "Clemens, your lecture was magnificent. It was eloquent, moving, sincere. Never in my entire life have I listened to such a magnificent piece of descriptive narration. But you committed one unpardonable sin—the unpardonable sin. It is a sin you must never commit again. You closed a most eloquent description, by which you had keyed your audience up to a pitch of the intensest interest, with a piece of atrocious anti-climax which nullified all the really fine effect you had produced."

== Admitted to bar ==
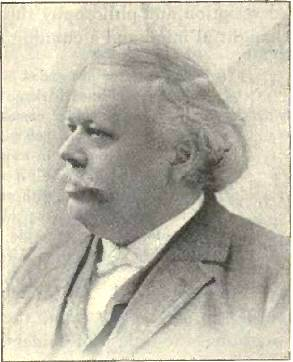
Thomas Fitch in 1865

Fitch kept up his law studies and in 1864 was admitted to the bar by the Nevada Supreme Court. In the same year he was elected from Virginia City as a delegate to the Nevada State Constitutional Convention. He was nominated by the Union Party and unsuccessfully campaigned for the role as territorial delegate to Congress from the Nevada Territory in 1864. He also campaigned across Nevada for Abraham Lincoln and Andrew Johnson. In 1865 Fitch moved to Washoe County and soon after was appointed county district attorney. When his term as district attorney expired in 1866, he moved to Belmont, Nevada, and practiced law there until 1868. He was elected as a Republican to the U.S. House of Representatives and the 41st Congress of the United States, serving from March 4, 1869 to March 3, 1871, and opened his first law practice.

In December 1869, he spoke against the pending anti-polygamy Cullom Bill, which would strip the Utah territory's residents of local authority. It proposed instead to outlaw the Utah Territorial Legislature, eliminate the offices of the territorial marshal and attorney general and transfer their authority to federal officers, give the federally appointed Governor the authority to appoint all officers in the territory, excluding constables, and place all local and territorial matters in the hands of federally appointed officials. Fitch attempted to persuade Congress that they should avoid the prospect of another Mormon war.

His opposition to the bill may have cost him votes at home, and he was not reelected in 1870 even though he represented the dominant Republican party. In 1870, his wife published her first novel, Bound Down: Or Life And Its Possibilities. Tom and his wife published Better days: or, A millionaire of to-morrow in 1891, and she wrote two more books in 1891 and 1893.

== Defends Brigham Young and church leaders ==
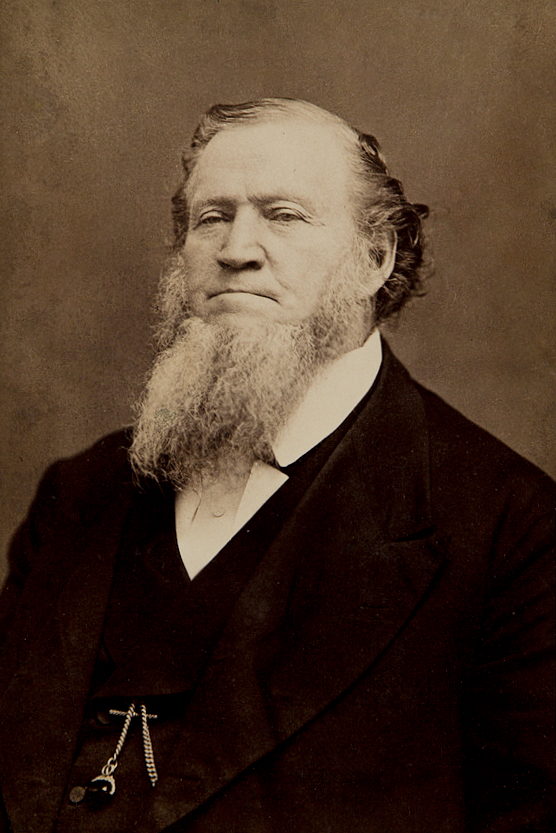
Fitch defended Brigham Young and served as general counsel to the LDS Church beginning in 1871.

On May 1, 1871, he went to Salt Lake City in connection with mining litigation, and while there was retained by Brigham Young as an attorney and general counsel to the Church. He was in charge of all the criminal and civil litigation in which Brigham Young and other Church leaders were involved.

On October 2, 1871, Brigham Young, Daniel H. Wells and others were served with an arrest warrant by U. S. Marshal at Young's residence in Salt Lake City. He was charged with lewd and lascivious cohabitation with his plural wives but allowed to remain in his home guarded by a marshal. The next day Apostle George Q. Cannon was also arrested on similar charges. On October 9, 1871, Brigham Young appeared before Chief Justice Thomas McKean in the case of People versus Brigham Young, Sr.. Fitch represented the church leaders and arranged for Young's bail. Fitch moved to quash the indictment.

On October 12, Judge McKean issued his decision on Fitch's motion to quash the indictment in which he positioned the case as a trial of the entire church.

But let the counsel on both sides, and the court also, keep constantly in mind the uncommon character of this case. The supreme court of California has well said: " Courts are bound to take notice of the political and social condition of the country which they judicially rule." It is therefore proper to say, that while the case at bar is called, "The People versus Brigham Young" its other and real title is, "Federal Authority versus Polygamic Theocracy."..A system is on trial in the person of Brigham Young.

McKean charged the defense with "proving that the polygamous practices charged in the indictment are not crimes." On October 16, Young pleaded innocent. The attorneys asked for time to prepare for the case and based on McKean's ruling, Fitch inferred that the trial would proceed in March. Young departed for St. George, Utah and Fitch left for New York. Shortly after their departure, McKean set the trial date for November 20. Assistant defense attorney Hempstead protested, and the prosecutor demanded forfeiture of Young's bail. The Associated Press ran a story that Brigham Young had fled from justice.

William "Wild Bill" Hickman, who had been arrested and jailed for murdering government arms dealer Richard Yates during the Utah War, implicated Brigham Young and others in Yates' murder. Hickman was excommunicated from the church as a result, although he was never convicted, nor was Young ever indicted based on his testimony. On April 15, 1872, the U. S. Supreme Court ruled in "Clinton et al vs. Englebrecht et al" that McKean's indictments were invalid, and Young and others were released from further prosecution.

He was elected a member of the 1872 Utah Constitutional Convention On the second day of the convention, he harshly criticized federal Judge McKean, who had been appointed by President Grant in 1870 as Chief Justice of Utah Territorial Supreme Court. McKean had removed virtually all locally elected officials from their roles and supplanted their authority with federal officials he appointed. McKean believed that he had a divinely appointed mission in Utah, "to the carrying out of which he was evidently prepared to subordinate all other considerations." He said this included "whenever and wherever I may find the local or federal laws obstructing or interfering therewith, by God's blessing I shall trample them under my feet." Fitch described him as "A sort of missionary exercising judicial functions," "a very determined man," "of considerable personal courage," "but not fit to be a judge."

During February and March Fitch spoke eloquently about the political necessity of forgoing polygamy from the Utah state constitution.

I am not here to attack polygamy from a theological, moral, or physical, but from a political standpoint. Certainly I do not propose to question the pure motives or the honesty of those who believe in and practice it. I am inclined to agree with Montesquieu and Buckle, that it is an affair of latitude and climate and race, and on these grounds alone its existence among a Saxon people, living in the north temperate zone, is a climatic anomaly. It did not grow out of any structural, or race, or social, or climatic necessities, and if it be, as asserted, the offspring of revelation here, I can only say that it needed a revelation to start it. That it has scriptural patriarchal origin and example is probably true, but that was in another age than ours, and in a different land. If Abraham had lived on the line of the overland road in the afternoon of the nineteenth century; if Isaac had been surrounded by 40,000,000 monogamous Yankees; if Jacob had associated with miners and been jostled by speculators, there would, I apprehend, have been a different order of social life in Palestine. The Mormon doctrine may be the true theology, and the writings of Joseph Smith the most direct revelations. The practice of polygamy may be a safeguard against the vice of unlicensed indulgence, and the social life of Utah the most sanitary of social reforms. All the advantages claimed for this State may be actual, but nevertheless the fact exists that polygamy is an anomaly in this Republic, existing hitherto by the sufferance of a people who now declare that it shall exist no longer.

On April 6, 1873, William H. Hooper and Thomas Fitch were elected as United States senators from the proposed State of Deseret, should it be admitted into the Union.

While practicing law in Utah, he very likely followed the prosecution of John D. Lee. Lee had been charged with murder in what was probably the most closely followed trial of the 19th century, the Mountain Meadows Massacre. Lee was the only person brought to trial for the attack, in which "a band of Mormons dressed as Paiute Indians ambushed a wagon train heading to California and killed more than a hundred innocents." Spicer and Fitch would later meet again in 1881 in Tombstone, Arizona as a result of the Gunfight at the O.K. Corral. He was defended by Wells Spicer and Fitch was probably acquainted with Spicer's work as an attorney. In 1874 Fitch returned to San Francisco and made his home there until 1877.

In 1877 he relocated to Prescott, Arizona, where he practiced law until 1884 and served as an adviser to Governor John C. Frémont. Clark Churchill joined him as a partner during 1878–1880. In 1878 he and several other members of the bar founded the Prescott Dramatic Association, an amateur theater troupe. He cast Harry Du Souchet in a role while Du Souchet was still a telegraph operator and before he became famous in New York City.

In 1879 he was elected a member of the 10th Arizona Territorial Legislature representing Yavapai County and was chosen as Chairman of the House Judiciary Committee. He served alongside Johnny Behan from Mohave County. Later in 1879 he moved his law practice to the frontier silver-mining boomtown of Tombstone. He was joined by William J. Hunsaker from San Diego. In October 1881 Fitch and Hunsaker were hired by the Earps when they were indicted for murder. Behan was by this time the Cochise County Sheriff and a witness for the prosecution during the Earp's preliminary hearing that determined whether the Earps and Doc Holliday would face murder charges as a result of the Gunfight at the O.K. Corral.

== Defends Earps and Doc Holliday ==
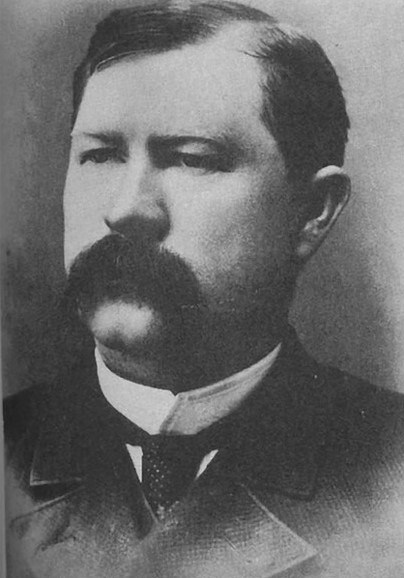
Virgil Earp

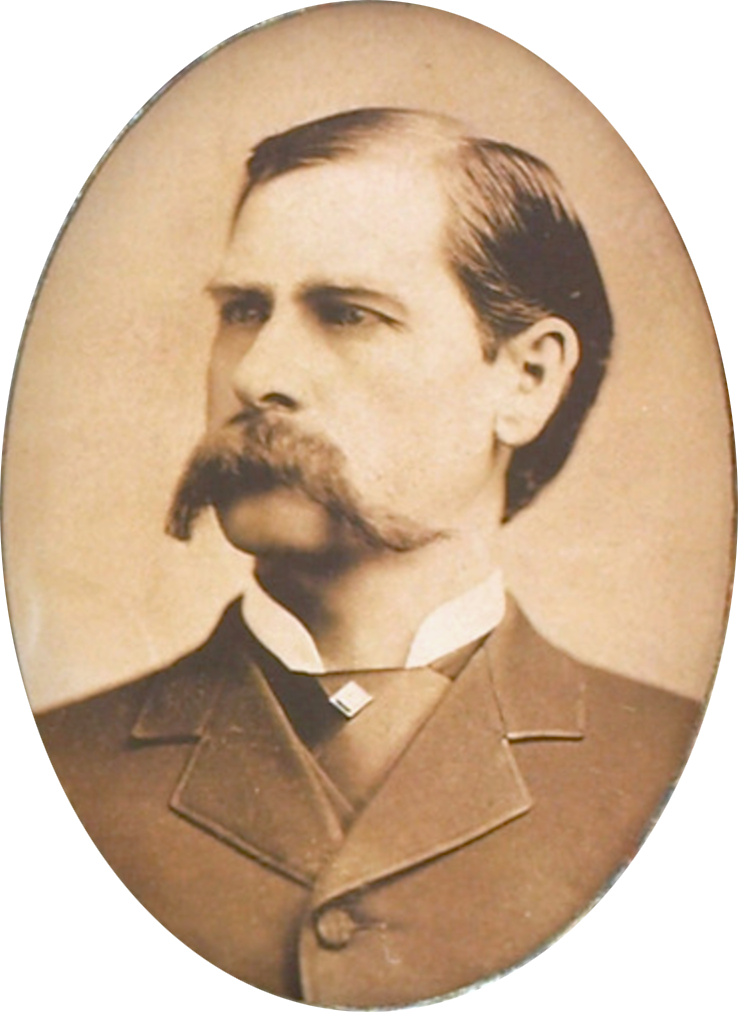
Wyatt Earp

On October 27, 1881, just one day after the Gunfight at the O.K. Corral that left Billy Clanton and Tom and Frank McLaury dead and Morgan and Virgil Earp wounded, Ike Clanton filed murder charges. A preliminary hearing was convened by Judge Wells Spicer on October 31. The Earps chose "the Silver-Tongued Orator of the Pacific Slope" as their lead attorney. Doc Holliday was defended by United States Court Commissioner Thomas J. Drum.

=== Preliminary hearing ===
The preliminary hearing turned into a month-long dramatic court-room confrontation, the longest in Arizona history. The legal purpose of the hearing was to determine whether a crime had actually been committed, and whether there was "sufficient cause" to bring the four defendants to trial. Fitch was 43 when he arrived in Tombstone early in 1881. He brought a wealth of trial experience in criminal law from his time in California, Nevada, and Utah. Fitch also contributed US$10,000 to Wyatt Earp's defense fund.

=== Prosecution blame Earps ===
The prosecution presented considerable evidence in an attempt to bind the Earps and Holliday over for trial. On the second day of the hearings, William Allen testified for the prosecution that "the firing commenced by the Earp party. I think it was Doc Holliday who fired first." Johnny Behan testified that he tried to prevent the confrontation. I "told them...I was down there for the purpose of disarming the Clantons and McLaurys. They wouldn't heed me, paid no attention. And I said, 'Gentleman, I am Sheriff of this County, and I am not going to allow any trouble if I can help it.' They brushed past me." He said Cowboys had put up their hands or thrown open their coats to show they were not armed, and that Doc Holliday had fired first. He testified that the first five shots had come from the Earps. He clearly blamed the Earps and Doc Holliday for instigating the shootout.

Fitch had seen Judge Wells Spicer as an attorney defend John D. Lee in the notorious 1857 Mountain Meadows Massacre, and it was likely that he had developed a deep appreciation for the judge. The two men had a great deal in common. Both had practiced criminal law, had written for newspapers, and both were Republicans. Fitch may have based his defense on what he saw as Spicer's repugnance of the perjured testimony and unjust outcome in Lee's case. In a preliminary hearing, the attorneys usually do not reveal their entire defense strategy. Fitch may have chosen to use the hearing as a forum to expose the entire case because he thought Spicer held considerably skepticism about the prosecution's case and would allow Fitch considerable latitude. Judge Spicer made several rulings favorable to the defense.

=== Prepares written testimony ===
Fitch had Wyatt Earp prepare a written statement, as permitted by Section 133 of Arizona law, which would not allow the prosecution to cross-examine him. The prosecution vociferously objected. Although the statute was not specific about whether it was legal for a defendant to read his statement, Spicer allowed his testimony to proceed.

Fitch was very successful in cornering witnesses into offering conflicting testimony or saying they did not remember. In several instances, he obtained testimony from prosecution witnesses and followed up with statements corroborated by others that conflicted with the prior testimony. Prosecution witnesses repeatedly stumbled when Fitch asked them questions, in many instances replying weakly, "I don't remember." Tombstone's chief prosecutor was Republican Lyttleton Price, who was aided by Ben Goodrich and, three days into the hearing, by co-counsel Will McLaury, brother to the dead Cowboys Frank and Tom McLaury. Will McLaury left his Texas law practice and his children with a caretaker to help prosecute the Earps and Doc Holliday. He summed up his attitude towards the Earps in a letter to a law partner: "I think I can hang them."

=== Exposes prosecution weaknesses ===
Cochise County Sheriff Johnny Behan testimony for the prosecution crumbled under Fitch's questioning. Behan testified that he had seen Doc Holliday holding a shotgun prior to the gunfight. He then offered an improbable scenario: Doc Holliday had first fired a nickel-plated pistol, then fired the shotgun, and then resuming shooting with the pistol. Another influential witness for the defense was Deputy District Attorney Winfield Scott Williams. In earlier testimony, Behan denied telling Virgil on the night after the gunfight that Virgil had acted properly. Williams testified that Sheriff Behan had inaccurately reported that conversation during which, according to Williams, Behan told Virgil that one of the McLaury brothers drew his gun first, and "You did perfectly right." Behan denied that he said anything resembling this. Fitch's ability to impeach the testimony of the County Sheriff and key witness probably influenced Judge Spicer, who had been subject to perjured testimony in the John D. Lee case that resulted in his client's execution.

Fitch was able to damage Ike Clanton's credibility through skillful questioning. In response to his questioning, Clanton denied seeking confirmation from Wyatt Earp about the reward offered by Wells, Fargo & Co, "dead or alive", for the stage robbers. When shown the telegram confirming the reward would be paid in either circumstance, he denied having ever seen it before. On November 12, he got Clanton to testify that he had never spoken to Ned Boyle on the morning of the gunfight, and on November 23, Boyle's testimony contradicted Clanton's. During Ike Clanton's testimony under cross-examination by Fitch, he said "I don't remember" 14 times. This and other contradictions impugned Clanton's testimony.

=== Earps exonerated ===
After a month of testimony from 30 witnesses, Spicer concluded that there was not enough evidence to indict the men. In his ruling, he noted that Ike Clanton had the night before, while unarmed, publicly declared that the Earp brothers and Holliday had insulted him, and that when he was armed he intended to shoot them or fight them on sight. On the morning of the shooting Ike was armed with revolver and Winchester rifle. Spicer noted that:

Witnesses for the prosecution state unequivocally that William Clanton fell or was shot at the first fire and Claiborne says he was shot when the pistol was only about a foot from his belly. Yet it is clear that there were no powder burns or marks on his clothes. And Judge Lucas says he saw him fire or in the act of firing several times before he was shot, and he thinks two shots afterwards.

Spicer specifically noted that Ike Clanton claimed the Earps were out to murder him, yet while unarmed had been allowed by the Earps to escape unharmed from the fight. He wrote, "the great fact, most prominent in the matter, to wit, that Isaac Clanton was not injured at all, and could have been killed first and easiest." He described Frank McLaury's insistence that he would not give up his weapons unless the marshal and his deputies also gave up their arms as a "proposition both monstrous and startling!"

Spicer said that Virgil in "calling upon Wyatt Earp, and J. H. Holliday to assist him... committed an injudicious and censurable act, and although in this he acted incautiously and without due circumspection," in the end "the Earps acted wisely, discretely and prudentially, to secure their own self preservation." "He needed the assistance and support of staunch and true friends, upon whose courage, coolness and fidelity he could depend..."

Spicer noted that if Wyatt and Holliday had not backed up Marshal Earp, then he would have faced even more overwhelming odds than he had, and could not possibly have survived. He invited the grand jury to confirm his findings, and two weeks later, it agreed with Spicer's finding and also refused to indict the men.

== Later career ==
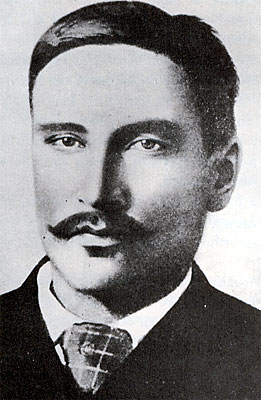
Fitch defended Ed Tewksbury, one of the last surviving family members of the Pleasant Valley War.

After his time in Arizona, Fitch spent two years traveling through Europe, the Southern United States, and California, after which he lived in Arizona for four years where he practiced law. In 1880 he removed to Minneapolis and formed a partnership with Mr. Morrison, which took the title of Morrison and Fitch.

In 1884 he left Arizona and for the next eight years resided part of the time in San Diego, and some time in San Francisco County. In 1891, he defended Ed Tewksbury who was accused of murdering Tom Graham in one of the final acts of violence growing out of the Pleasant Valley War in central Arizona. He settled in New York City in December 1892 for a period before he returned full-time to Arizona in 1893. He briefly moved to Utah in 1894 when the territory was granted statehood and announced his candidacy for United States senator but failed to receive the nomination. Fitch returned to Arizona and settled in Phoenix where he remained through at least 1896.

Later in his life he credited his oratorical skills to the influence of Col. E. D. Baker and Thomas Starr King and to the time he spent with Mark Twain and Joaquin Miller. He also said he was influenced by the friendship of Leland Stanford, Collis P. Huntington, Mark Hopkins and Charles Crocker. He spoke in Phoenix in 1906 in support of the territory's desire for dual statehood with New Mexico. He lived at different times in San Diego and in Honolulu. While in Hawaii, he represented sake manufacturers who were attempting to have their product classified as a beer instead of a liquor for customs purposes. In 1909, he moved to Los Angeles where he became a writer for the Los Angeles Times, a position he held through 1916. He died at a Masonic home in Decoto, California, on November 12, 1923. He was interred in Cypress (later renamed Chapel of the Chimes) Cemetery in Decoto (later Hayward), California.

U.S. House of Representatives
Preceded by Delos R. Ashley	Member of the U.S. House of Representatives from Nevada's at-large congressional district 1869–1871	Succeeded by Charles West Kendall
