= Banking Committee =

Banking Committee may refer to:

- Canadian Senate Standing Committee on Banking, Trade and Commerce
- United States Senate Committee on Banking, Housing, and Urban Affairs
- United States House Committee on Financial Services (also referred to as the House Banking Committee)
