= Augusta County Committee of Safety =

The Augusta County Committee of Safety was the shadow government of patriots from Augusta County, Virginia prior to and throughout the American Revolution. One of many such revolutionary committees of safety, the Augusta County committee is notable for writing the first known policy proposal to create a permanent independent state government and federal union of American colonies. The paper was presented by Thomas Lewis at the Fifth Virginia Convention on May 10, 1776, preceding the United States Declaration of Independence by more than 50 days.

== Background ==
After Parliament passed the Coercive Acts, also known as the Intolerable Acts, to punish Massachusetts for the Boston Tea Party, the Virginia House of Burgesses proclaimed that June 1, 1774, would be a day of "fasting, humiliation, and prayer" as a show of solidarity with Boston. In response, Lord Dunmore, the royal governor of Virginia, dissolved the House of Burgesses. The burgesses then constituted themselves as the First Virginia Convention on August 1, 1774, and held a series of Virginia Conventions in place of the defunct House. On July 1, 1775, the convention passed an ordinance requiring each county of Virginia to elect a county committee to serve as the executive authority of that county, and on August 1, 1775, the following men were chosen for the Augusta County committee:

- Sampson Mathews
- Alexander McClanahan
- Samuel McDowell

And:

- Michael Bowyer (alternate)
- Thomas Lewis (alternate)
- George Moffett (alternate)

Silas Hart was elected to chair the committee.

The committee's independence proposal is believed to have been written between August 1, 1775 and the date of its presentation, May 10, 1776. It is unknown whether the paper itself is still extant, and is currently a lost work as the specifics of the proposal are unknown. However, the presentation of the proposal was documented in the journal of the Fifth Virginia Convention as such:

"A representation from the committee of the county of Augusta was presented to the Convention, and read: setting forth the present unhappy situation of the country, and, from the ministereal measures of vengeance now pursuing, representing the necessity of making the confederacy of the United Colonies the most perfect, independent, and lasting; and of framing an equal, free, and liberal government, that may bear the test of all future ages."

Hugh Blair Grigsby, Virginia historical scholar, states that the paper presented by Lewis was, "the first distinct and responsible proposition in favor of independence and of a federal union which I have met with."

Gabriel Jones, the clerk of court for Hampshire County, referenced the proposal in an irascible letter to George Washington, on June 6, 1777. He states: "These wretches, I mean inhabitants, of Augusta have forgot when they petitioned the Assembly for abolishing the established church and to declare independancy [sic] how they promised their lives and fortunes should be spent in supporting the Cause if their humble prayer should be granted."

== Bibliography ==
- Grigsby, Hugh Blair (1855). The Virginia Convention of 1776. OCLC 3886825.
- Grigsby, Hugh Blair (1890). The History of the Virginia Federal Convention of 1788: with some account of some eminent Virginians of that era who were members of the body. Richmond, Virginia: Virginia Historical Society.
- Virginia House of Delegates (1816). The Proceedings of the Convention of Delegates Held at the Capital, in the City of Williamsburg, in the Colony of Virginia, on the 6th of May, 1776 (reprint). Richmond, Virginia: Virginia House of Delegates.
- Waddell, Joseph A. (1902). Annals of Augusta County, Virginia, from 1726 to 1871. Staunton, Virginia: C. R. Caldwell. OCLC 3880311.
- Proceedings of the Virginia Historical Society at the Annual Meeting Held December 21-22, 1891: With Historical Papers Read on the Occasion, and Others, Volume 6. Richmond, Virginia: Virginia Historical Society. 1887.
