= Budget Committee =

Budget Committee may refer to:

- Budget Committee (Germany), standing committees of German parliaments
- Budget Committee (Iceland), a standing committee of the Icelandic parliament
- Committee of the Verkhovna Rada on issues of budget, a standing committee of Ukraine's unicameral parliament
- European Parliament Committee on Budgets, a committee of the European Parliament
- United States House Committee on the Budget, a standing committee of the United States House of Representatives
- United States Senate Committee on the Budget, a standing committee of the United States Senate
