= Committee of Public Safety (disambiguation) =

Committee of Public Safety was an organization during the French Revolution.

Committee of Public Safety may also refer to:

- The Committee of Public Safety proclaimed by General Salan during the May 1958 crisis in Algeria
- Committee of Public Safety (1871), in France during the Paris Commune
- The Committee of Safety overthrew Queen Liliʻuokalani in 1893 and established the Republic of Hawaii

== See also ==
- Committee of Safety (disambiguation), the name for several groups throughout history
