= The Committee =

The Committee may refer to any of the following:

- The Committee (improv group), a San Francisco-based improvisational comedy group
- The Committee (film), a 1968 independent film directed by Peter Sykes
- The Committee (racehorse), fell at the first fence in the 1995 Grand National
- The Committee (fan group), a group of Star Trek fans who arranged the first Star Trek convention
- The Committee (novel), a novel by Sonallah Ibrahim
- The Committee (play), a play by Robert Howard
