= Vigilance committee =

Group of vigiliantes acting as a government

A vigilance committee is a group of private citizens who take it upon themselves to administer law and order or exercise power in places where they consider the governmental structures or actions inadequate. Prominent historical examples of vigilance committees engaged in forms of vigilantism include abolitionist committees who, beginning in the 1830s, worked to free enslaved people and aid fugitive slaves, in violation of the laws at the time. Many other vigilance committees were explicitly grounded in racial prejudice and xenophobia, administering extrajudicial punishment to abolitionists or members of minority groups.

== American vigilance committees ==
=== Abolition and fugitive slaves ===
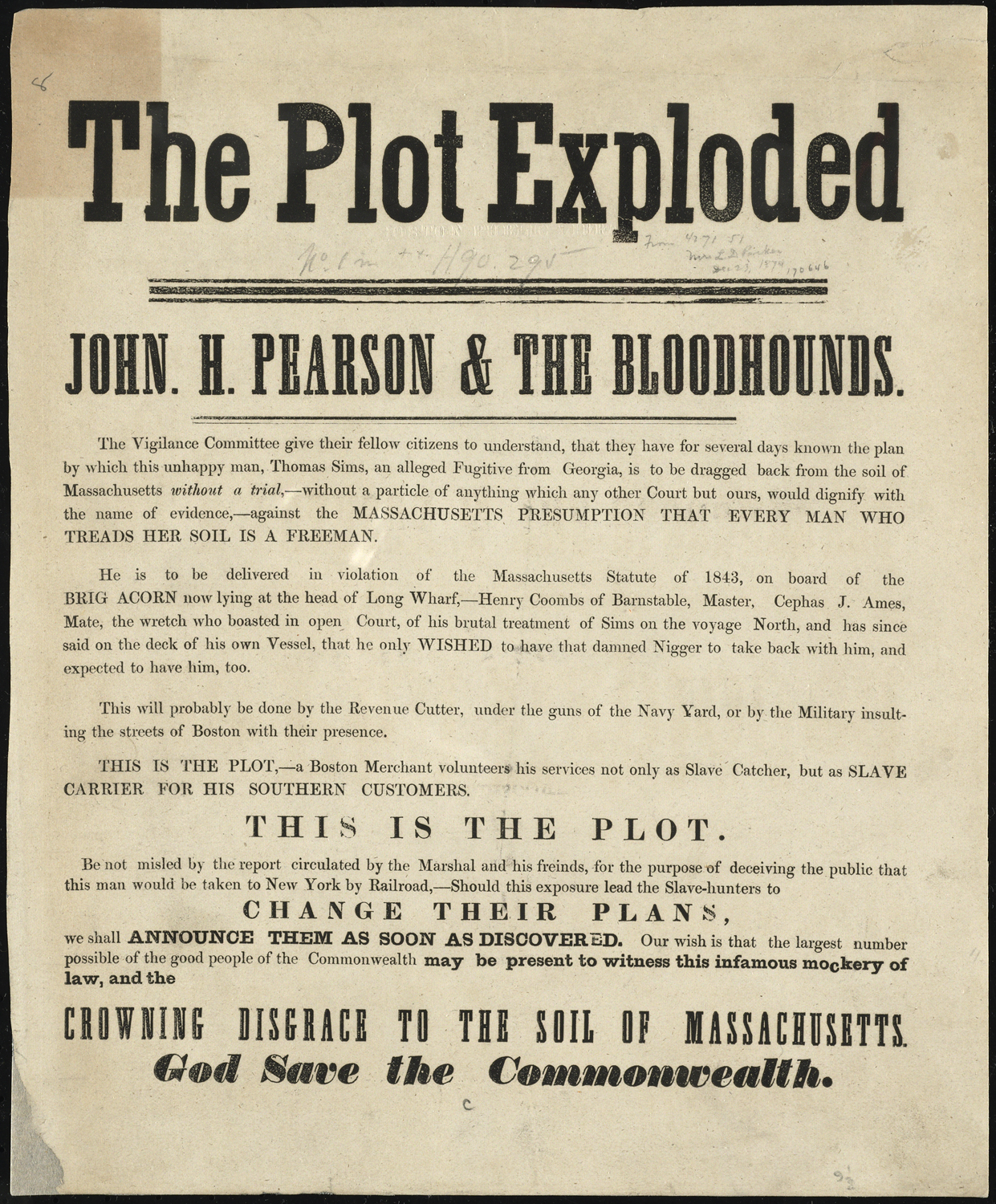
Vigilance committee in Boston in 1851, after Thomas Sims's arrest

Abolitionists met at Faneuil Hall in the 1830s and formed the Committee of Vigilance and Safety to "take all measures that they shall deem expedient to protect the colored people of this city in the enjoyment of their lives and liberties." The abolitionist New York Committee of Vigilance and Vigilant Committee of Philadelphia were also established in the 1830s and assisted fugitive slaves and the Underground Railroad.

Between 1850 and 1860, following the passage of the Fugitive Slave Act of 1850, professional bounty hunters began swarming through Northern states searching for missing enslaved people. In response, vigilance committees were set up in several places in the North to assist the escaped enslaved people. For example, Gerrit Smith called the Fugitive Slave Convention of 1850 "on behalf of the New York State Vigilance Committee." Many such committees were integral parts of the Underground Railroad.

=== In the American West ===
In the Western United States, before and after the Civil War, various vigilance committees formed with the stated purpose of maintaining law and order and administer summary justice where governmental law enforcement was inadequate. In reality, those high in the social hierarchy often used them to attack maligned groups, including recent immigrants and racial or ethnic groups. In newly settled areas, vigilance committees promised security and mediated land disputes.

In ranching areas, they ruled on ranch boundaries, registered brands, and protected cattle and horses. In the mining districts, they defended claims, settled claim disputes, and attempted to protect miners and other residents. In California, some residents formed vigilance committees to take control of officials whom they considered to be corrupt. This occurred in San Francisco during the 1856 trial of Charles Cora, Belle Cora's husband, and James Casey.

=== Other United States vigilance committees ===
- In 1835, after a kangaroo court "conviction", a vigilance committee in Nashville, Tennessee was responsible for the public whipping of Rev. Amos Dresser for the crime of distributing abolitionist publications, which he claimed he did not do. The names of all 62 members of the self-appointed vigilance committee were published by the American Anti-Slavery Society, annotating some as "Elder in the Presbyterian Church" and the like.
- Philadelphia Vigilance Committee, 1840s and 1850s: abolitionists who worked to subvert the Fugitive Slave Act and helped escaped enslaved people, including Henry Box Brown
- Jackson County, Indiana Vigilance Committee, a.k.a. the Scarlet Mask Society or Southern Indiana Vigilance Committee, 1868: captured and hanged ten members of the Reno Gang
- Know-Nothing Riot, 1850s, New Orleans, Louisiana
- San Francisco Committee of Vigilance, 1851 and 1856, San Francisco, California
- San Luis Obispo Vigilance Committee, 1850s, San Luis Obispo, California: known to have hanged six Californios and engaged in battles around the area
- 3-7-77 Vigilance Committee, 1860s–1870s, Virginia City, Montana
- Anti Horse Thief Association, 1860s, Fort Scott, Kansas
- Baldknobbers, 1880s, Taney, Christian, and Greene Counties, Missouri
- Knights of Liberty, c. 1917–1918, Oklahoma, Minnesota, Wisconsin, and California

== English vigilance committees ==
- Whitechapel Vigilance Committee, 1888, London: founded to capture Jack the Ripper
- The Oxford Vigilance Committee was formed during World War I in Oxford, UK, a town whose own men of military age had gone to war and where soldiers were stationed. The Committee ran volunteer patrols of women to discourage, observe, and report on what was perceived as "immoral" behaviour of the town's women. In November 1916, the Committee issued a report "on the Moral Condition of Oxford", warning that the town's streets were "crowded with young girls, whose dress [and] behaviour show that they are deliberately laying themselves out to attract men". Their reports included detailed accounts of casual or adulterous sexual liaisons in the town. Births out of wedlock in Oxford decreased from 1914 to 1925, but the Committee attributed the reduction to "forced marriages" and abortions.

== Other vigilance committees ==
- Biddulph Peace Society, 1876, Biddulph, Ontario, Canada
- Vigilance Committee of Gaelic Athletic Association: A committee tasked with identifying association members who either played or attended "foreign games", predominantly soccer and rugby union, in contravention of the association's rules. The rule was in place until 1971, up to which point many GAA players who also wished to play other sports had to resort to elaborate tactics, including the wearing of disguises, the use of false names, and travelling covertly, e.g. in the boot of a car, to attend matches.

== In film and media ==
- The Ox-Bow Incident (1943) is a movie directed by William A. Wellman, based on the novel of the same name written by Walter Van Tilburg Clark (1940). The story tells of a group of men pursuing cattle rustlers, capturing and hanging them, and the moral consequences.
- Ride in the Whirlwind (1966) is a movie, directed by Monte Hellman and written by Jack Nicholson, that tells the story of innocent men who are thought to be part of a gang on the run from members of a vigilance committee.

== See also ==
- Vigilantism in the United States of America
- Vigilance committee (trade union)
- Vigilante
- Committee of Safety (disambiguation)
- Jungle justice
