= George W. Parsons =

American lawyer and banker (1850–1933)

George Whitwell Parsons
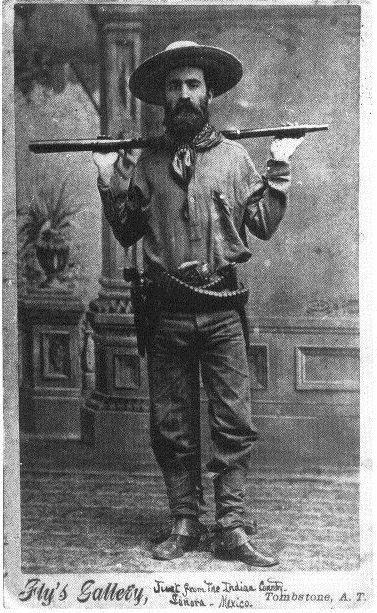
- Parsons on January 2, 1883, after returning from Sonora, Mexico
- Born: August 26, 1850; Washington, D.C.
- Died: January 5, 1933 (aged 82); Los Angeles, California
- Occupations: Attorney, banker
- Known for: His detailed diary of life in the era of Virgil and Wyatt Earp

George Whitwell Parsons (August 26, 1850 – January 5, 1933) was an American attorney and banker during the 19th century Old West. He kept a detailed daily diary of his life in the west, especially while he lived in Tombstone, Arizona Territory from 1879 to 1887. He described life in Tombstone in detail, including his interaction with individuals who became famous such as Wyatt Earp and Ike Clanton.

== Early life ==
Parsons was born in Washington, D.C., and raised to practice law in his father's law firm. However, he became disillusioned with that field of work, and for a time he worked as a salvager in Florida, salvaging shipwrecks, beginning around 1874. After a near death experience while working in Cape Sable, during a hurricane, Parsons decided to find another line of work, and moved to California, where he worked as a bank clerk for three years in Los Angeles, starting in 1876. He then began working for the National Gold Bank & Trust Co., but when the bank closed down in 1880 he found himself out of work.

== Diary ==
He began keeping a diary in 1869 following the death of his mother, an event that profoundly affected him and which he noted on its anniversary every year. He wrote in the diary every day for sixty years, from 1869 to 1929.

== Life in Tombstone ==
Parsons moved with his friend Milton Clapp to the boomtown of Tombstone, Arizona. He worked as a laborer at first in the mines and later partnered with J. L. Redfern as mining agents. He became acquainted with John Clum, who was mayor as well as editor of The Tombstone Epitaph.

The events he witnessed in Tombstone made the diaries interesting to researchers. He became a member of the "Committee of Vigilance" and served on its leadership "Council of Ten".

Parsons was good friends with Wyatt Earp and John Clum. He knew lawmen Fred White, Virgil Earp, Johnny Behan, and Morgan Earp. He was also acquainted with men on the other side of the law, including Ike Clanton, "Curly Bill" Brocius, Johnny Ringo and others of note. For the next seven years Parsons would keep daily records of his day, and detailed what happened leading up to, during, and after the Gunfight at the O.K. Corral.

During the Tombstone fire in June 1881, Parsons helped tear down a balcony to prevent the fire from spreading when he was struck by the falling wood. Parsons' upper lip and nose were pierced by a splinter of wood, severely flattening and deforming his nose. Dr. George E. Goodfellow devised a wire framework and in a series of treatments and plastic surgery successfully restored Parsons' nose to his pre-injury profile. He refused payment because Parsons had been hurt as he was assisting others.

His diary gives valuable insight into the personalities and characters involved in those events. He also documented and described other notable events, including the grand opening of the Oriental Saloon, which later become famous in Old West history. He became friends with Reverend Endicott Peabody during his six months of residence in Tombstone during early 1882, and when Parsons learned the Reverend was a pretty good boxer, arranged a match between him and the Methodist minister, Joseph P. "Mac" McIntyre. Endicott won.

Parsons was, in 1885, the first librarian for the Tombstone Library, and in 1887 he left Tombstone, which by that time was on the decline.

== Later life ==
Parsons moved to Los Angeles, California in 1887. He became director of the Los Angeles Chamber of Commerce and served as president of the Los Angeles Mining and Stock Exchange. Portions of the diary was donated to the Arizona Pioneers Historical Society during the 1930s by Emma Parsons, his widow.

Parsons stopped writing in his diary in 1929. Editor Carl Chafin later spent several years researching the diary, and later published the portions covering 1879 to 1887. Parsons died in Los Angeles, and was buried in "Evergreen Cemetery". His diaries are still published, most notably in the book A Tenderfoot in Tombstone, the Private Journal of George Whitwell Parsons: The Turbulent Years, 1880–82, authored by Lynn R. Bailey.

Even at the time of Parsons' death, he was recognized for his place in history. His obituary in The San Bernardino Daily Sun characterized him as a "desert pioneer" and a "veteran of the wildest days of Tombstone", and noted that his diaries had become significant sources for writers seeking to depict the Old West.
