= Weekly Nugget =

Weekly Nugget may refer to:

- Weekly Nugget (Tombstone), newspaper in Tombstone, Arizona (1879 to 1882)
- Weekly Nugget (Placerville), newspaper in Placerville, California
