= Tombstone (film) =

1993 film by George P. Cosmatos

- Theatrical release poster
- Directed by: George P. Cosmatos
- Written by: Kevin Jarre
- Produced by: James Jacks; Sean Daniel; Bob Misiorowski
- Starring: Kurt Russell; Val Kilmer; Michael Biehn; Powers Boothe; Robert Burke; Dana Delany; Sam Elliott; Stephen Lang; Joanna Pacula; Bill Paxton; Jason Priestley; Michael Rooker; Jon Tenney; Billy Zane; Charlton Heston
- Cinematography: William A. Fraker
- Edited by: Frank J. Urioste; Roberto Silvi; Harvey Rosenstock
- Music by: Bruce Broughton
- Production companies: Cinergi Pictures; Alphaville Films
- Distributed by: Buena Vista Pictures Distribution (North America/South America) (Note: Distributed under the Hollywood Pictures banner.); Cinergi Productions (International, through Summit Entertainment)
- Release date: December 25, 1993
- Running time: 130 minutes
- Country: United States
- Language: English
- Budget: $25 million
- Box office: $73.2 million

Tombstone is a 1993 American Western film directed by George P. Cosmatos, written by Kevin Jarre (who was also the original director, but was replaced early in production), and starring an ensemble cast featuring Kurt Russell and Val Kilmer, with Sam Elliott, Bill Paxton, Powers Boothe, Michael Biehn, Dana Delany and Charlton Heston in supporting roles, and narration by Robert Mitchum.

The film is loosely based on real events that took place in the 1880s in Southeast Arizona, including the Gunfight at the O.K. Corral and the Earp Vendetta Ride. It depicts several Western outlaws and lawmen, such as Wyatt Earp, William Brocius, Johnny Ringo, and Doc Holliday.

Tombstone was released by Hollywood Pictures in theatrical wide release in the United States on December 25, 1993, grossing $73.2 million worldwide. The film was a financial success, and in the Western genre, it ranks number 25 in the list of highest-grossing films since 1979. Critical reception was generally positive, with the story, directing, and acting receiving praise. Particular praise went towards Val Kilmer's memorable performance as the hard-drinking Doc Holliday. The film has become a cult classic since its release.

== Plot ==
In 1879, members of a red sash-wearing outlaw gang called the Cowboys, led by "Curly Bill" Brocius, ride into a Mexican town and interrupt a local police officer's wedding. They massacre the assembled policemen in retribution for killing two of their fellow gang members. Before being shot, a local priest warns them that their acts of murder and savagery will be avenged, referring to the Four Horsemen of the Apocalypse.

Wyatt Earp, a retired peace officer with a notable reputation, reunites with his brothers Virgil and Morgan in Tucson, Arizona, where they venture on toward Tombstone to settle down and pursue their fortune. There, they encounter Wyatt's longtime friend Doc Holliday, who is seeking relief from his worsening tuberculosis in the dry climate. Josephine Marcus and Mr. Fabian arrive shortly after with a traveling theater troupe. Meanwhile, Wyatt's common-law wife, Mattie Blaylock, is becoming dependent on laudanum. Wyatt finds himself drawn to Josephine's free-spirited nature. The Earp brothers begin profiting from a stake in a gambling emporium and saloon when they have their first hostile encounter with the Cowboys. Doc and Curly Bill's second-in-command, the psychotic Johnny Ringo, verbally spar but are stopped before they can duel.

As tensions rise, Wyatt is pressured to help rid Tombstone of the Cowboys, though he refuses, no longer a lawman. After a visit to an opium den, Curly Bill begins shooting erratically in the street. Marshal Fred White attempts to disarm him, only to be shot dead. Wyatt takes Curly Bill into custody, fending off both a mob attempting to lynch the Cowboy and a handful of his brethren wanting him freed. Curly Bill stands trial but is found not guilty due to a lack of witnesses.

Virgil, unable to tolerate the lawlessness, becomes the new marshal and imposes a weapons ban within the city limits. This leads to a gunfight at the O.K. Corral, in which Cowboys Billy Clanton and the McLaury brothers are killed. Virgil and Morgan are wounded, and County Sheriff Johnny Behan's allegiance with the Cowboys is made clear. In retaliation for the Cowboy deaths, Wyatt's brothers are ambushed; Morgan is killed, while Virgil is left disabled. A despondent Wyatt and his family leave Tombstone and board a train, with Cowboys Ike Clanton and Frank Stilwell close behind, preparing to ambush them. Having been clandestinely appointed a US Marshal, Wyatt sees that his family leaves safely and then surprises the assassins. He kills Stilwell, but he lets Clanton live to carry a message: Wyatt has vowed to put an end to the Cowboys. Wyatt, Doc, and reformed Cowboys Sherman McMasters, Texas Jack Vermillion, and Turkey Creek Jack Johnson form a posse to seek revenge.

Wyatt and his posse are ambushed in a riverside forest by the Cowboys. Wyatt walks into the creek, miraculously surviving the enemy fire, and kills Curly Bill and many other Cowboys. Johnny Ringo becomes the Cowboys' new leader. When Doc's health worsens, the group is accommodated by Henry Hooker at his ranch. When one of her troupe members is killed by the Cowboys, Josephine leaves Tombstone, bidding farewell to Wyatt.

Ringo lures McMasters into the Cowboys' clutches under the pretense of parley and then sends a messenger (dragging McMasters' corpse) to tell Wyatt that he wants a showdown to end the hostilities; Wyatt agrees but knows he cannot beat Ringo. Wyatt sets off for the showdown. Doc, having exaggerated his sickness, secretly goes ahead of Wyatt and confronts a surprised Ringo, challenging him to a duel. In the showdown, Doc kills Ringo. Wyatt, Doc, and their allies finish eliminating the Cowboys, although Clanton escapes their vengeance by renouncing his red sash. Doc is sent to a sanatorium in Colorado, where he dies of his illness. At Doc's urging, Wyatt pursues Josephine to begin a new life.

The final narration mentions that the Cowboy Gang was destroyed forever, Clanton was shot and killed in an attempted robbery, Mattie died of a drug overdose shortly after leaving Tombstone, and Virgil and Allie Earp moved to California, where Virgil, despite his physical limitations, still had a long career as a lawman. Wyatt and Josephine would stay together for 47 years until Wyatt's death in L.A. in 1929, and among the pallbearers at his funeral were William S. Hart and Tom Mix.

== Cast ==
- Kurt Russell as Wyatt Earp
- Val Kilmer as Doc Holliday
- Sam Elliott as Virgil Earp
- Bill Paxton as Morgan Earp
- Powers Boothe as "Curly Bill" Brocius
- Michael Biehn as Johnny Ringo
- Charlton Heston as Henry Hooker
- Jason Priestley as Billy Breakenridge
- Jon Tenney as Sheriff Johnny Behan
- Stephen Lang as Ike Clanton
- Thomas Haden Church as Billy Clanton
- Dana Delany as Josephine Marcus
- Paula Malcomson as Allie Earp
- Lisa Collins as Louisa Earp
- John Philbin as Tom McLaury
- Dana Wheeler-Nicholson as Mattie Blaylock
- Joanna Pacuła as Big Nose Kate
- Michael Rooker as Sherman McMasters
- Harry Carey Jr. as Marshal Fred White
- Billy Bob Thornton as Johnny Tyler
- Tomas Arana as Frank Stilwell
- Paul Ben-Victor as Florentino "Indian Charlie" Cruz
- Frank Stallone as Ed Bailey
- Robert John Burke as Frank McLaury
- Billy Zane as Mr. Fabian
- John Corbett as Johnny Barnes
- Buck Taylor as John "Turkey Creek Jack" Johnson
- Terry O'Quinn as Mayor & Publisher of Tombstone Epitaph John Clum
- Peter Sherayko as John "Texas Jack" Vermillion
- Wyatt Earp III (Note: Real name Glen Wyatt Earp, a fifth cousin of lawman Wyatt Earp.) as Billy Claiborne
- Robert Mitchum as Narrator

== Production ==
The film was shot primarily on location in Arizona. Shooting began in May 1993. The film was supposed to be screenwriter Kevin Jarre's first job as director, but he was quickly overwhelmed by the job, failing to get needed shots and falling behind the shooting schedule. A month into filming, he was fired by producer Andrew Vajna and replaced with George P. Cosmatos. Michael Biehn, a close friend of Jarre, considered quitting. Biehn recalled feeling that director Cosmatos "had no understanding or appreciation of the screenplay." By the time of Cosmatos' arrival, though, all actors stayed on board. The new director brought a demanding, hard-nosed sensibility to the set, which led to conflicts with some of the crew members (mainly with cinematographer William Fraker). Meanwhile, Kurt Russell worked quickly with producer James Jacks to pare down Jarre's sprawling script, deleting subplots and emphasizing the relationship between Wyatt and Doc.

One way or another, Americans have to deal with the West and its glorious, sordid, sadistic past…we fought lawnessness to create an even more lawless law, one that excused and perpetuated genocide. Even today, this gun-obsessed nation that we love remains mired in a dilemma centered on pistols and rifles with romantic ties to our murderous past. We love Westerns. We learn everything from Westerns and yet learn nothing from them. We continue killing ourselves in an unconscionable way…That's why when I had the chance to play Doc Holliday, I grabbed it.

— Val Kilmer, I'm Your Huckleberry (Note: "I'm your huckleberry." is one of the many celebrated lines of dialogue that Kilmer, as Doc Holliday, delivers in Tombstone. According to the Dictionary of Americanisms (1877) by John Russell Bartlett, the usage of "huckleberry" in this context is a shortening or reference of a Southern phrase, "Huckleberry above the Persimmon", meaning to excel.) (2020)

Russell has stated that it was he, and not Cosmatos, who directed the film, as Jarre's departure led to the studio's request. Russell stated that Cosmatos was brought in as a "ghost director" as a frontman because Russell did not want it to be known that he was directing. Co-star Val Kilmer has supported Russell's statements about working heavily behind the scenes and stating that Russell "essentially" directed the film, but stopped short of saying that Russell did the actual directing. Biehn stated that Russell never directed him personally.

Dana Delany spoke much more positively about Cosmatos's work: "We had a few days where we didn't have a director, and Kurt was definitely the cheerleader, keeping everybody's morale up. Then they brought on George Cosmatos. And it was hard because you have a new director who's trying to set his tone. His first day they wanted to start easy, which was a little unfortunate for me: his first day directing was all of my big scenes, especially the big love scene in the field with me and Kurt. It was kind of like, 'let's do the girl stuff first; let's get that outta the way.' It wasn't really fair to me, you know? I probably should have fought for myself a little bit more. George said to me, 'Just be fun! Just be girly! And I was like, oh my God! But I ended up really liking George, and he and I got along great. He was in a very difficult position, but I knew that he was highly sensitive underneath it all. He really wanted to make a good movie, and he cared deeply about it. I'm sure there's always going to be camps, pro or con against George. But in my mind, he really cared about it."

One of Tombstone's editors was Roberto Silvi, who edited most of Cosmatos's films, including Massacre in Rome, The Cassandra Crossing, Of Unknown Origin and Leviathan.

Cosmatos was highly focused on accurate historical detail, including costumes, props, customs, and scenery, to ensure authenticity. All the mustaches in the movie were real except Jon Tenney's (Sheriff Behan), who had to be clean-shaven for his prior project and was thus the only fake mustache. Val Kilmer practiced for a long time on his quick-draw speed and gave his character a genteel Southern accent. Two locations were used to make the town of Tombstone look bigger. The scene in which Wyatt throws an abusive card dealer (Billy Bob Thornton) out of a saloon was to show that Wyatt was a man who used psychology to intimidate. Thornton's lines in the scene were ad-libbed, as he was only told to "be a bully".

== Soundtrack ==
Tombstone: Complete Original Motion Picture Soundtrack

Film score by Bruce Broughton
- Released: March 16, 2006
- Length: 1:25:29
- Label: Intrada

The original motion picture soundtrack for Tombstone was originally released by Intrada Records on December 25, 1993. On March 16, 2006, an expanded two-disc version of the film score was also released by Intrada Records. The score was composed and produced by Bruce Broughton, and performed by the Sinfonia of London. David Snell conducted most of the score (although Broughton normally conducts his own scores, union problems mandated another conductor here), while Patricia Carlin edited the film's music.

The album begins with the Cinergi logo, composed by Jerry Goldsmith and conducted by Broughton.

== Release ==
Tombstone premiered in the United States on December 25, 1993, six months before Lawrence Kasdan's Wyatt Earp.

=== Home media ===
Tombstone was released on VHS video format on November 11, 1994. The Region 1 Code widescreen edition of the film was released on DVD in the United States on December 2, 1997. Special features for the DVD only include original theatrical trailers. A director's cut of Tombstone was also officially released on DVD on January 15, 2002. This two-disc set includes "The Making of Tombstone" featurette in three parts: "An Ensemble Cast", "Making an Authentic Western", and "The Gunfight at the O.K. Corral". Other features include an audio commentary by director George P. Cosmatos, an interactive Tombstone timeline, the director's original storyboards for the O.K. Corral sequence, the Tombstone "Epitaph" — an actual newspaper account, the DVD-ROM feature "Faro at the Oriental: Game of Chance", and a collectible Tombstone map. This DVD release is also THX certified and features a DTS 5.1 audio track.

The widescreen high-definition Blu-ray Disc edition of the theatrical cut was released on April 27, 2010, featuring the making of Tombstone, director's original storyboards, trailers, and TV spots. A supplemental viewing option for the film in the media format of video-on-demand is available, as well.

The film was released by Walt Disney Studios Home Entertainment on Ultra HD Blu-ray on April 22, 2025, featuring a 4K restoration.

== Reception ==
=== Box office ===
During its opening weekend, Tombstone opened in third place at the US box office behind The Pelican Brief and Mrs. Doubtfire, grossing $6,454,752 in business showing at 1,504 locations. The film's revenue increased by 35% in its second week of release, earning $8,720,255. For that particular weekend, the film stayed in third place, screening in 1,955 theaters. The film went on to gross $56,505,065 in total ticket sales in the United States and Canada. It ranks 20th out of all films released in 1993. Internationally, it grossed $16.7 million for a worldwide total of $73.2 million.

=== Critical reception ===
Rotten Tomatoes reports that 76% of 51 sampled critics give Tombstone a positive review, with an average score of 6.30/10. The site's critical consensus reads, "If you're seeking a stylish modern western with a solid story and a well-chosen ensemble cast, Tombstone is your huckleberry." Following its cinematic release in 1993, Tombstone was named "one of the 5 greatest Westerns ever made" by True West Magazine. The film was also called "One of the year's 10 best!" by KCOP-TV in Los Angeles, California. Audiences polled by CinemaScore gave the film an average grade of "A−" on an A+ to F scale.

On Siskel & Ebert, Roger Ebert recommended the movie while Gene Siskel did not. In a later review of Wild Bill, Ebert singled out Kilmer's portrayal as "the definitive saloon cowboy of our time."

In a mixed review, Chris Hicks writing in the Deseret News said, "aside from Russell and Val Kilmer's scene-stealing, sickly, alcoholic Doc Holliday, there are so many characters coming and going, with none of them receiving adequate screen time, that it becomes difficult to keep track of them all." He commented, "some very entertaining moments here, with Russell spouting memorable tough-guy lines". Overall, he felt, "Taken on its own terms, with some lowered expectations, Western fans will have fun." Emanuel Levy of Variety believed the film was a "tough-talking but soft-hearted tale" which was "entertaining in a sprawling, old-fashioned manner." Regarding screenwriter Jarre's dialogue, he noted, "Despite the lack of emotional center and narrative focus, his script contains enough subplots and colorful characters to enliven the film and ultimately make it a fun, if not totally engaging experience." He also singled out Val Kilmer as the standout performance. The film was not without its detractors. James Berardinelli writing for ReelViews offered a negative review, recalling how he thought, "The first half of Tombstone isn't an example of great filmmaking, but it is engaging. There's a sense of growing inevitability as events build to the shoot-out at the OK Corral. The melodramatic "serious" moments are kept to a minimum, and the various gunfights are choreographed with style and tension. Then, at the one-hour ten-minute mark, the Clanton gang and the Earps square off. From there, things get progressively worse. Not only is the last hour anticlimactic, but it's dull. Too many scenes feature lengthy segments of poorly-scripted dialogue, and, in some cases, character motivation becomes unclear. The gunplay is more repetitious than exciting. The result—a cobbled-together morass of silly lines and shoot-outs—doesn't work well."

Stephen Holden writing in The New York Times saw the film as being a "capacious Western with many modern touches, the Arizona boom town and site of the legendary O.K. Corral has a seedy, vaudevillian grandeur that makes it a direct forerunner of Las Vegas." He expressed his satisfaction with the supporting acting, saying, "[the] most modern psychological touch is its depiction of Josephine (Dana Delany), the itinerant actress with whom Wyatt falls in love at first sight, as the most casually and comfortably liberated woman ever to set foot in 1880s Arizona." Critic Louis Black, writing for The Austin Chronicle, viewed Tombstone as a "mess" and that there were "two or three pre-climaxes but no climax. Its values are capitalist rather than renegade, which is okay if it's metaphoric rather than literal. Worse, as much as these actors heroically struggle to focus the film, the director more successfully hacks it apart." Owen Gleiberman of Entertainment Weekly gave the film a C− rating, calling it "preposterously inflated" at "135 minutes long". He observed the film as being a "three-hour rough cut that's been trimmed down to a slightly shorter rough cut" with "all that holds the film together is Kurt Russell's droll machismo." Author Geoff Andrew of Time Out commented, "Kilmer makes a surprisingly effective and effete Holliday". He negatively acknowledged that there was "a misguided romantic subplot and the ending rather sprawls" but ultimately exclaimed the film was "'rootin', tootin' entertainment with lots of authentic facial hair." Richard Harrington of The Washington Post highlighted the film's shortcomings declaring, "too much of Tombstone rings hollow. In retrospect, not much happens and little that does seems warranted. There are so many unrealized relationships you almost hope for redemption in a longer video version. This one is unsatisfying and unfulfilling." Alternately though, columnist Bob Bloom of the Journal & Courier openly remarked that the film "May not be historically accurate, but offers a lot of punch for the buck." He concluded by saying it was "A tough, guilty-pleasure Western."

Although Val Kilmer's performance as Doc Holliday was praised, he did not get an Oscar nomination for Best Supporting Actor. He was nominated for Best Male Performance and Most Desirable Male at the MTV Movie Awards. The film was nominated for Best Classic Film Home Media Release at the Saturn Awards.

== Books ==
A paperback novel of the same name adapted from Kevin Jarre's screenplay, written by Giles Tippette and published by Berkley Publishers, was released on January 1, 1994. The book dramatizes the real-life events of the gunfight at the O.K. Corral and Earp Vendetta Ride, as depicted in the film. It expands on Western genre ideas in Jarre's screenplay.

The Making of Tombstone, a book about the film, was published in 2018.

== Sources ==
- Kilmer, Val (2020). I'm Your Huckleberry. New York: Simon & Schuster. ISBN 978-1-9821-4489-0.
