= Johnny Behan =

American old west sheriff (1844–1912)

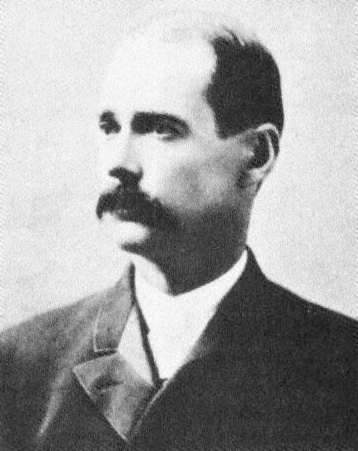

Cochise County Sheriff
- In office February 1881 – November 1882

Member of the Arizona Territory House of Representatives
- In office January 1879 – January 1881
- In office January 1873 – January 1875

Mohave County Recorder
- In office 1877–1879

Yavapai County, Arizona Sheriff
- In office January 1871 – December 1873
- Preceded by: John P. Bourke

Yavapai County, Arizona Recorder
- In office 1868 – January 1871

Personal details
- Born: John Harris Behan; October 24, 1844 Westport, Missouri, US
- Died: June 7, 1912 (aged 67) Tucson, Arizona, US
- Spouses: Victoria Zaff (divorced); Josephine Marcus (common-law)
- Children: 2
- Known for: Testified against Earps and Doc Holliday during the Spicer Hearing, member of "Ten Percent Ring"

John Harris Behan (October 24, 1844 – June 7, 1912) was an American law enforcement officer and politician who served as Sheriff of Cochise County in the Arizona Territory, during the gunfight at the O.K. Corral and was known for his opposition to the Earps. Behan was sheriff of Yavapai County from 1871 to 1873. He was married and had two children, but his wife divorced him, accusing him of consorting with prostitutes. He was elected to the Seventh Arizona Legislative Assembly, representing Yavapai County. In 1881, Wyatt Earp served for about five months as undersheriff of the eastern half of Pima County. When Wyatt resigned, Behan was appointed to fill his place, which included the mining boomtown Tombstone. When Cochise County was formed in February 1881, Behan was appointed as its first sheriff. Tombstone became the new county seat and the location of Behan's office. Sadie Marcus was his mistress, possibly as early as 1875 in Tip Top, Arizona, and certainly from 1880 until she found him in bed with another woman and kicked him out in mid-1881.

After the Gunfight at the O.K. Corral, Behan testified at length against the Earps. He supported the Cowboys' statements that they had raised their hands and offered no resistance, and that the Earps and Doc Holliday had murdered three cowboys. After the Earps were exonerated, Deputy U.S. Marshal Virgil Earp was maimed in an ambush on December 28, 1881, and assistant deputy Morgan Earp was killed by assassins on March 18, 1882. The outlaw Cowboys named as suspects in both shootings were either let go on a technicality or were provided alibis by fellow Cowboys. Wyatt Earp killed one of the suspects, Frank Stilwell, in Tucson. Deputy U.S. Marshal Wyatt and his federal posse set out after other suspects, pursued by Behan and his county posse composed mostly of Cowboys.

Behan's posse never caught up with the much smaller federal posse. The Earps left Tombstone under a cloud of suspicion. Sadie left Tombstone for San Francisco in early 1882, and Wyatt Earp followed her to San Francisco, where they began a lifelong relationship that lasted 46 years. Behan was arrested for graft and later failed to win re-election as sheriff. He later was appointed as the warden of the Yuma Territorial Prison and had various other government jobs until his death in 1912.

== Early life ==
Behan was born on October 24, 1844, (Note: John H. Behan's Arizona death certificate lists his date of birth as October 1845 in Westport, Jackson County, Missouri. However, the same certificate lists his age of death as 67, not 66, which it would have been for a birth year of 1844. The birth date of October 1844 from the 1900 census was presumably provided by Behan himself at the time, and gives a death age of 67 that agrees with the death certificate.) in Westport, Missouri, in what is now Kansas City, the third of nine children. His parents, who had wed on March 16, 1837, in Jackson County, Missouri, were Peter Behan, a carpenter from County Kildare, Ireland, and Sarah Ann Harris, a native of Madison County, Kentucky. John Harris Behan was named for his mother's family and his maternal grandfather, although the 1900 Federal census reports an 1845 date of birth for him. (Note: Behan was living in a boarding house at 1400 Pennsylvania Avenue in Washington, DC, and is listed as a "promoter", born in Missouri in October 1844. 1900 Federal Census for Washington, D.C., Enumeration District 81, Sheet Number 3, Line 18. This is also corroborated by the 1910 Census for Tucson, Arizona, where he was enumerated in the 2nd Ward of Tucson, Pima County, Territory of Arizona; Pima County Enumeration District No. 103, Sheet 13-A, Line 31.)

Behan moved west to San Francisco, working as a miner and a freighter. During the American Civil War, Behan was a 19-year-old civilian employee of Carleton's Column of Union Volunteers in California. He fought in the Battle of Apache Pass on July 14–15, 1862 and in 1863 settled in Tucson, where he found work delivering freight to military installations. In 1864, he served as a clerk to the First Arizona Legislative Assembly in Prescott, the territorial seat. This brought 19-year-old Behan into contact with some of the most influential men in the state.

== Moves to Arizona ==
In 1865, he moved to Prescott, the new capital of the Arizona Territory, where he speculated in real estate and prospected for minerals. While prospecting along the Verde River February 28, 1866, five other men and he were attacked by Indians. Behan helped fight them off and gained a reputation as a brave man. He also operated a sawmill. Yavapai County Sheriff John P. Bourke married German immigrant and widow Harriet Zaff in 1860. She had four children from her two prior marriages: Benjamin, Catherine, Victoria, and Louisa. Bourke hired Behan as an undersheriff in 1866, and fourteen-year-old Victoria caught Behan's eye. After two years Behan resigned to run for Yavapai County Recorder, which he won in 1868 at age 23. It was one of the most important jobs in the county as he was responsible for maintaining accurate records that were the basis for all taxes collected.

Whenever he was not holding office, Behan worked in various saloons or mines.

=== Marriage and family ===
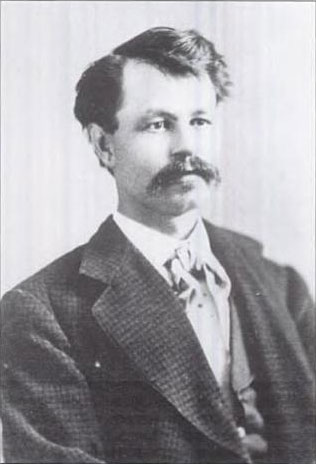
Johnny Behan in 1871, about the time of this first marriage: Josephine Sadie Marcus a decade later would describe him as "young and darkly handsome, with merry black eyes and an engaging smile".

After divorcing Behan, Victoria Zaff married Charles A. Randall on September 15, 1881, in Prescott, Arizona Territory. This is probably their wedding photo.

In March 1869, Behan married Bourke's step-daughter Victoria Zaff in San Francisco, Bourke's home town. Victoria was already pregnant. The couple quickly returned to Prescott, Arizona Territory. Only three months later, on June 15, 1869, Victoria had her first child, Henrietta. Victoria and Johnny later had a son, Albert Price Behan, born in Prescott on July 7, 1871 or 1872 (d. January 27, 1949).

=== Political office ===
Behan succeeded his father-in-law in office as the Yavapai County sheriff from January 1871 to December 1873. He took a chance at a more important position and in 1873 successfully ran for office as Yavapai County's representative to the Seventh Arizona Legislative Assembly.

The Territorial Legislature met in Tucson or Prescott for a six- to eight-week legislative session, and Behan attended his first session in January 1874 in Tucson. On September 28, 1874, Behan was nominated as sheriff at the Democratic convention in Yavapai County. The Prescott Miner reported on October 6, 1874, that "J.H. Behan left on an 'electioneering' tour toward Black Canyon, Wickenburg and other places" north and east of present-day Phoenix. Behan was gone for 35 days campaigning for the sheriff's office.

=== Meets Sadie Marcus ===
Some accounts state that Sadie Marcus ran away from her parents' home in San Francisco in 1874 and traveled to Prescott, Arizona. Her friend Dora Hurst and she, with other passengers on a stage coach, had been forced to hole up in a ranch house near Cave Creek by Apache Indians, who had escaped the Cave Creek reservation. Indian fighter Al Sieber was tracking the Apaches. Sadie said the famous Indian scout led them to safety. According to Sadie, she first met "John Harris" here, whom she described as, "young and darkly handsome, with merry black eyes and an engaging smile". She said, "my heart was stirred by his attentions as the heart of any girl (would) have been under such romantic circumstances. The affair was at least a diversion in my homesickness, though I cannot say I was in love with him."

=== Divorce from Victoria Zaff ===
Behan returned to Prescott on November 11, 1874, but lost the election. He apparently spent considerable time away from home, either at saloons along Prescott's Whisky Row or at nearby brothels. His affairs were finally too much for Victoria. On May 22, 1875, Behan's fortunes took a turn for the worse when Victoria filed for divorce. While being divorced alone wasn't completely unusual, Victoria took the extra step of asserting in her divorce petition that Behan "has within two years last past at divers times and places openly and notoriously visited houses of ill-fame and prostitution at said town of Prescott."

Witness Charles Goodman testified, "I saw the defendant [Behan] at a house of ill-fame … at which resided one Sada Mansfield, commonly called Sada, a woman of prostitution and ill-fame, and the said defendant did at the time and at the house spoken of, stay all night with and sleep with the said Sada Mansfield, and I know of the defendant having committed similar acts at the same place and at various times than at the particular time referred to." The divorce action also cited Behan's threats of violence and unrelenting verbal abuse. Victoria told the court, Behan approached her in a "threatening and menacing manner calling me names such as whore and other epithets of like character and by falsely charging me with having had criminal intercourse with other men, threatened to turn me out of the house, quarreling with, and abusing me, swearing and threatening to inflict upon me personal violence."

Behan claimed their daughter Henrietta was not his, and Victoria's request for support for Henrietta was stricken from the divorce petition. He didn't contest any of her other allegations and was ordered to pay $16.16 a month in child support for Albert alone. Henrietta died on March 6, 1877, at age seven of scarlatina.

Behan did not restrict his extramarital liaisons to paid arrangements. Throughout his life, he had sexual relationships with numerous women, including the wives of friends and business partners.

=== Opens saloon in Tip Top ===
In April 1876, Behan became the census marshal for Yavapai County, and spent several weeks covering the district and completing his census chores. In the fall of 1876, he ran for Yavapai County sheriff and lost by 78 votes. In January 1877, he was selected as sergeant at arms for the Ninth Legislative Assembly while it met in Tucson. He then moved to the northwest Arizona Territory, where he served as the Mohave County Recorder in 1877, and then deputy sheriff of Mohave County in Gillet in 1879. In October 1879 the Weekly Journal Miner reported that Behan was planning on opening a business in Tip Top, a then fast-growing silver mining town in central Arizona, and in November 1879, Behan opened a saloon there.

He was elected to represent Mohave County at the Tenth Arizona Legislative Assembly, which met beginning January 6, 1879, in Prescott. In the middle of 1879, he relocated to Prescott, where he opened a business providing services to local mines and exercised his skills as a lawman by joining several posses. While in Prescott, he got into a skirmish with some Chinese laundry men, and outnumbered, was clubbed and beaten by the businessmen.

On June 2, 1880, Behan was counted in the 1880 census in Tip Top, Arizona as a saloon keeper. His was initially the only one of six saloons without a prostitute. But 19-year-old Sadie Mansfield, whose occupation was given as "Courtesan", the same person that his former wife Victoria had named in their divorce five years earlier, was also living in Tip Top.

On June 2, 1880, the U.S. census had recorded Sadie Mansfield, whose occupation was "courtesan", as living in Tip Top. On June 1 or 2, 1880, William V. Carroll, the census enumerator for the 9th ward in San Francisco, visited the Marcus home. He lived about two blocks from the family. He recorded Josephine as a member of the Marcus household, information that may have been offered by her parents. Sadie Mansfield and Sadie Marcus also were both 19 years old, born in New York, and their parents were from Prussia.

According to Josephine, at some point she felt ill and returned to her parents' home in San Francisco. She said Behan followed her and persuaded her parents to approve their engagement. Some modern researchers question the likelihood that her father, a Reform Jew, would approve her union with Behan, an unemployed office-seeker, 14 years older than his daughter, a Gentile, and a divorced father. Sadie later said Behan told her parents that he couldn't leave his livery stable business for a wedding in San Francisco and Sadie said her parents approved their engagement.

== Moves to Tombstone ==
In August 1880, Behan sought the nomination as County Recorder in Yavapai County once more, but was defeated. On September 15, The Epitaph noted his arrival with his eight-year-old son Albert in Tombstone. Albert, who had a hearing impairment, had been living with his mother, grandmother and his uncle John Bourke Jr. in Prescott in 1880.

=== Sadie Marcus joins him ===
Depending on which version of events is correct, Sadie said she first arrived in Tombstone as part of the Pauline Markham troupe on December 1, 1879, for a one-week engagement. The Pauline Markham troupe put on more than a dozen performances of H.M.S. Pinafore from December 24, 1879, through February 20, 1880. Sadie, possibly using the stage name May Bell, may have played Cousin Hebe. The city of Prescott, Arizona, fell in love with the troupe, and they stayed for nearly six months.

Sadie reported later in life that Behan pestered her in San Francisco with letters from Tombstone, bragging about the growing town and promising to marry her. She said she thought Behan's marriage proposal was a good excuse to leave home again. She wrote, "life was dull for me in San Francisco. In spite of my bad experience of a few years ago the call to adventure still stirred my blood." Josephine arrived in Tombstone in mid-October. When Behan avoided setting a wedding date, she was ready to end the relationship, but Behan persuaded her to stay. They lived together as husband and wife, and Josephine signed her name as Josephine Behan for a period of time, but no marriage record has been found. Sadie later said she lived with a lawyer and his wife during this time period. Considering that Josephine said she first arrived in Arizona with the Markham troupe on December 1, 1879, and she joined Behan in Tombstone in October 1880, her reference to "my bad experience of a few years ago" means she must have actually been in Arizona for some time before 1879.

Based on the information Sadie provided the Earp cousins with, when correlated with other sources, Josephine may have left San Francisco for Prescott as early as October 1874, when she was 13 or 14 years old. Author Roger Ray thoroughly researched Josephine's story about joining the theater company and found many inconsistencies. The Markham troupe was documented as leaving San Francisco on board the Southern Pacific Railroad, not a ship nor a stagecoach, for Casa Grande, Arizona in October 1879, the end of the line. Sadie Marcus's name was never included among those on the Markham troupe's rolls in 1879.

The Yuma Arizona Sentinel reported on October 25, 1879, "Tuesday arrived a Pinafore Company for Tucson, composed of Misses Pauline Markham, Mary Bell, Belle Howard, and Mrs. Pring, and Messrs. Borabeck and McMahon." From Yuma, the troupe took a stagecoach to Tucson, not Prescott. The train trip was not interrupted by Indians. Ray states that Josephine didn't have a friend named Dora Hirsch. Her real name was Leah Hirschberg, whose mother was actually a music teacher. This family lived only a few blocks from where Josephine lived with her family. But Leah never left San Francisco with Josephine. She instead enjoyed some brief success as a juvenile actress on the San Francisco stage during the 1870s.

Bat Masterson, a friend of Wyatt Earp's who was in Tombstone from February to April 1881, described Sadie to Stuart Lake as "an incredible beauty" and as the "belle of the honkytonks, the prettiest dame in three hundred or so of her kind." Honkytonk bars in that era often had a reputation as place for prostitution and his choice of language ("three hundred or so of her kind") may have referred to Josephine's work as a prostitute.

=== Elected Undersheriff and sheriff ===
When Behan first arrived in Tombstone in September 1880, he also got a job bar manager in the Grand Hotel, a favorite of the outlaw Cowboys, and a good place to make political connections. He also bought part interest in the Dexter Livery Stable with John Dunbar, where local businessmen could rent horses.

Wyatt Earp had been appointed undersheriff for the eastern section of Pima County by Pima County Sheriff Charles Shibell on July 29, 1880. The Cowboys, mostly Southerners, supported the Democratic ticket and Shibell. Elections were held on November 2, and it was expected that Democrat Shibell would be defeated by Republican Bob Paul, who Wyatt had supported during the campaign.

Shibell won the election by a 46-vote margin. Opponent Bob Paul filed suit on November 19 alleging ballot box stuffing in the San Simon Cienega precinct, since the precinct delivered a 103 to 1 vote for Shibell in a precinct estimated to contain only 15 eligible voters. James Johnson later testified for Bud Paul in the election hearing and said that the ballots had been left in the care of Democrat Phin Clanton. Meanwhile, a week after the election on November 9, 1880, Earp resigned. The position of undersheriff was now open, and Shibell immediately selected Democrat Johnny Behan to serve as Tombstone area undersheriff.

In February 1881, the San Simon results were thrown out by the election commissioners, but Shibell filed an appeal. Shibell was finally removed from office in April and replaced by Bob Paul. But the election was now moot. On February 1, 1881, during the vote counting investigation, the eastern area of Pima County containing Tombstone had been split off to form the new Cochise County.

Behan's partner in the Dexter Livery, John Dunbar, through his family in their home town in Bangor, Maine, was "close family friends" of the powerful Senator James G. Blaine, one of the most powerful Republican congressmen of his time. The Dunbars used their influence to help Behan get appointed sheriff of the new Cochise County, in February 1881. Behan had already served two terms in the Territorial Legislature and was more politically connected than Earp. When the state created Cochise County, Governor John C. Frémont appointed, and the territorial legislature approved, Behan as sheriff on February 10, 1881.

In a back room deal with Wyatt Earp, he promised Wyatt Earp a position as Cochise County undersheriff, if Earp (the only other previous undersheriff for Tombstone) would not oppose Behan's appointment. Behan took office in the new position in April, with his offices in the county seat, Tombstone, but reneged on the deal with Earp, appointing prominent Democrat Harry Woods instead.

Later that year, Behan gave a contrived explanation of his actions during the hearings after the gunfight at the O.K. Corral. He said he broke his promise to appoint Earp because of an incident shortly before his appointment. Searching for a stolen horse belonging to him, Wyatt learned in late 1880 that the horse was in nearby Charleston. Wyatt spotted Billy Clanton attempting to leave town with the horse and, hand on his gun, persuaded Billy to release it. Behan was in Charleston to serve a subpoena on Ike Clanton. Billy carried the subpoena from Behan to Ike using Wyatt's horse. Ike was hopping mad when Behan finally found him, for Earp had told Clanton that Behan "had taken a posse of nine men down there to arrest him." Behan took offense at Wyatt's tactics and changed his mind about appointing Wyatt. Holliday reported in an interview in 1882 that "from that time a coolness grew up between the two men."

=== Corruption charges ===
As Cochise County sheriff, one of Behan's duties was collecting prostitution, gambling, liquor, and theater fees, taxes for which he received 10% of all proceeds. He developed a reputation for graft and was seen as the head of the "Ten Percent Ring". Rumors of graft and corruption followed him during his tenure as sheriff. On January 31, 1882, Behan was arrested for collecting bills totaling $300 twice, arraigned in front of Justice Stilwell, and discharged due to a technicality. In 1882, after Southern Pacific Railroad completed laying tracks and building facilities across the northern portion of Cochise County, he assessed them $8,000,000, which they appealed. The Board of Supervisors reduced the assessment to $1,000,000, substantially reducing Behan's take by $25,000.

=== His son Albert in Tombstone ===
Behan's ex-wife Victoria in 1881 and sent Albert to live with his father in Tombstone sometime afterward. Behan was already living with Sadie in 1880, and Albert grew close to her. This relationship lasted for much of the rest of their lives.

=== Beginnings of friction with Wyatt Earp ===
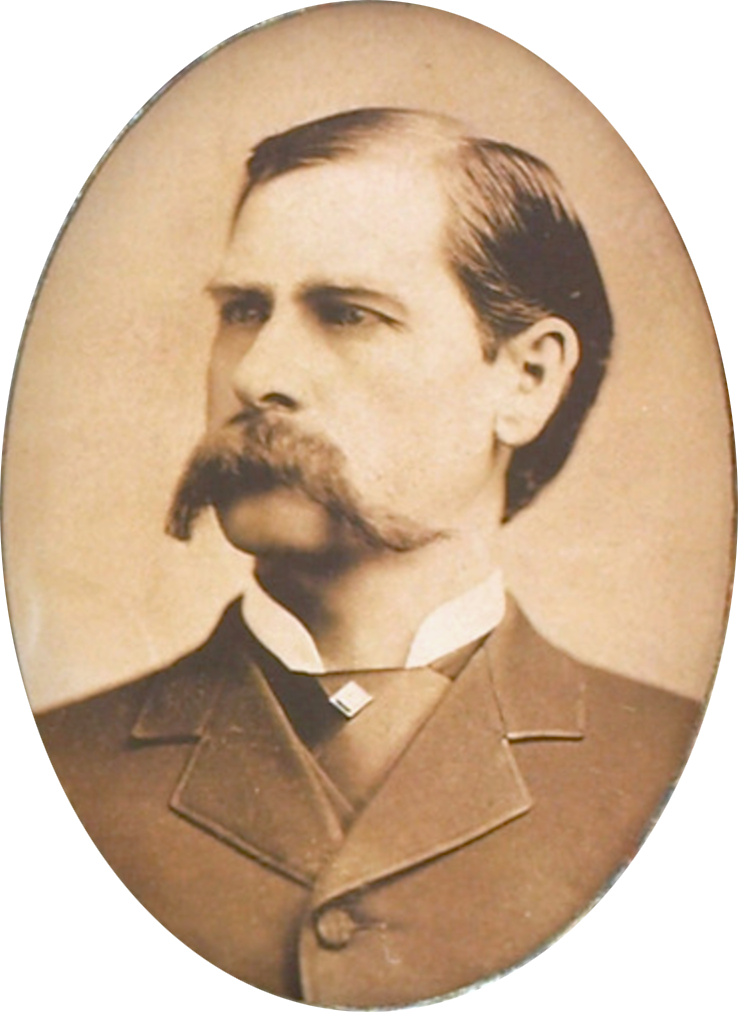
Wyatt Earp in about 1870.

Wyatt Earp testified later saying that he had promised not to publicly campaign to the governor against the appointment (not election) of Behan, in return for an appointment by Behan as Behan's own undersheriff. But after being appointed, Behan appointed another man, Southern Democrat Harry Woods, to the position that Wyatt thought would go to him.

At the preliminary hearing into Ike's murder charges against the Earps after the gunfight at the O.K. Corral, Behan explained that he appointed Woods rather than Earp due to an incident involving a stolen horse of Virgil Earp's, which was recovered by Wyatt from Billy Clanton. This happened sometime after Behan had been appointed undersheriff in November 1880, and his move to Cochise County sheriff the next spring. At the time, Wyatt was not a law officer, but had used the threat of Behan riding out to the Clantons' ranch as a bluff to get Clanton to turn over the horse. As it happened, Behan was riding to the ranch to serve a subpoena related to the ballot-box stuffing incident, not to recover the horse, and the incident embarrassed the Cowboys and also Behan, who for a time had been made to look like he was supporting Earp against the Cowboys.

=== Split from Sadie ===
Sometime during early 1881, Sadie arrived home to find Behan in bed with the wife of a friend of theirs, and she kicked Behan out of the home they had built with her father's money. One version of the story is that Sadie had taken Albert, who had a hearing impairment, to San Francisco for treatment. Upon their return, they arrived late in the evening and a day earlier than expected. They found Behan in bed with another woman. Behan was embarrassed by the public breakup. Most Tombstone residents thought that Marcus and Behan were legally married. Her breakup with Behan was publicized by The Tombstone Epitaph.

Tombstone diarist George W. Parsons never mentioned seeing Wyatt and Sadie together and neither did John Clum in his memoirs.

Earp had been in a common-law marriage with Mattie Blaylock since about 1873 and she was listed as his wife in the 1880 census. It is not known when Earp and Blaylock ended their relationship, except that after the gunfight at the O.K. Corral, she went to Colton, California, where the rest of the Earp family lived. She waited for Earp to come get her there and when he didn't, she resumed a life of prostitution in Pinal, Arizona, where on July 3, 1888, she took a lethal dose of laudanum together with alcohol. Her death was officially ruled as "suicide by opium poisoning".

=== Affiliation with the Cowboys ===
The records show evidence that Cochise County Marshall Behan was sympathetic to the interests of and a friend to Ike Clanton, "Curly Bill" Brocius, as well as Johnny Ringo, and a group of cattle rustlers and ranchers, loosely known as "Cowboys". Some of the Cowboys were also active as rustlers in the U.S. side of the border after the Mexicans lowered tariffs and stepped up military patrols after 1882. Frank Stilwell was an assistant Deputy under Behan for several months until shortly before he was a suspect in the Bisbee stage holdup. Behan employed several of the outlaws as sheriff's deputies during their pursuit of Deputy U.S. Marshal Wyatt Earp's posse after he was alleged to have killed Frank Stilwell in Tucson

=== Gunfight at the O.K. Corral ===
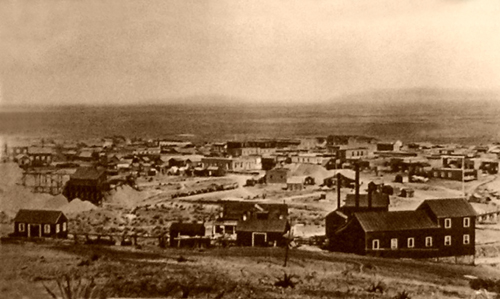
Tombstone, Arizona Territory in 1891.

In August 1881, Behan fired deputy Frank Stilwell for "accounting irregularities". Stilwell was arrested by a combined federal and sheriff's posse a month later for a Bisbee stage robbery, an action that would indirectly lead to the O.K. Corral gunfight.

Behan was a key player in the events immediately preceding the shootout at the O.K. Corral on October 26, 1881. Behan went down to try to disarm the Cowboys carrying weapons in violation of city ordinance. Behan attempted to persuade Frank McLaury to give up his weapons, but Frank insisted that he would only give up his guns after City Marshal Virgil Earp and his brothers were disarmed. While Ike Clanton was planning to leave town, Frank McLaury said he had decided to remain behind to take care of some business. A letter written afterward by their older brother, William McLaury, a judge in Fort Worth, Texas, claimed that both Frank and Tom were planning to conduct business before leaving town to visit him in Fort Worth. Billy Clanton, who had arrived on horseback with Frank, intended to go with the McLaurys to Fort Worth.

After Behan talked to the Cowboys, he saw the Earps and Holliday walking down Fremont Street. He walked about "22 or 23 steps" and intercepted them at Bauer's Butcher Shop. Wyatt said he gave them conflicting information. First, he told Virgil, "For God's sake don't go down there or you will get murdered." When Virgil replied, "I am going to disarm them," Behan said, "I have disarmed them." Later on Behan insisted he had said he went to see the Cowboys only "for the purpose of arresting and disarming them."

=== Behan attempts arrest ===
The lawmen killed three Cowboys: Tom McLaury, Billy Clanton and Frank McLaury. Virgil, Morgan, and Doc Holliday were wounded. As the lawmen were carried to their homes, they passed in front of the Sheriff's Office, and Johnny Behan told Wyatt Earp, "I will have to arrest you." Wyatt paused two or three seconds and replied very forcibly: "I won't be arrested today. I am right here and am not going away. You have deceived me. You told me these men were disarmed; I went to disarm them."

=== Behan testimony ===
As provided by territorial law, Ike Clanton filed murder charges against the four lawmen. Behan testified for the prosecution during the preliminary hearing, supporting the Clanton's version of events. According to the prosecution, the Cowboys had offered no resistance. Behan gave strong testimony that the Cowboys had not resisted but had thrown up their hands and turned out their coats to show they were not armed. He told the court that he heard Billy Clanton say, "Don't shoot me. I don't want to fight." He also testified that Tom McLaury threw open his coat to show that he was not armed and that the first two shots were fired by the Earp party.

Behan testified that from the time the Earps passed him by to confront the Cowboys, he had watched them closely. Under cross-examination by attorney Thomas Fitch, he admitted seeing Holliday carrying the messenger shotgun towards the confrontation. All the witnesses testified that Holliday had been seen with a shotgun. Behan also testified he was concentrating on the Earps during the gun fight, but he did not see the shotgun used. He insisted that Holliday fired the first shot from a nickel-plated revolver. But the coroner had already testified that Tom McLaury was killed by a shotgun blast. For Behan's "testimony to make any sense, the court would have to believe that Holliday marched down Fremont Street carrying a shotgun; put it aside in order to pull out his pistol; fired the first shot, presumably at Billy Clanton; and then picked up the shotgun in order to kill Tom McLaury—all in the space of a few seconds."

Behan's sympathy to the Cowboys was well known, and documents were located in 1997 that showed Behan served as guarantor for a loan to Ike Clanton during the Spicer hearing that followed.

=== Testimony discredited ===
Three defense witnesses gave key evidence that discredited Behan's testimony. One of the most notable witnesses was H. F. Sills, an AT&SF RR engineer who had just arrived in town and knew none of the parties involved. The second key witness was Addie Bourland, a dressmaker whose shop was across the street from the gunfight, and the third was Judge J.H. Lucas of the Cochise County Probate Court, who corroborated Addie Bourland's testimony. Justice Wells Spicer ruled on November 30 that there was not enough evidence to indict the men.

=== Seeks Earps' arrest ===
On December 28, 1881, Virgil Earp was ambushed and maimed. On March 18, assassins shot through a window and killed Morgan Earp. The Cowboys who were identified as suspects in both cases got off on either legal technicalities or were provided alibis by men who said they were in Charleston at the time Morgan was shot. Wyatt felt he had no choice but to take the law into his own hands.

On March 20, while escorting Virgil and his wife Addie through Tucson to catch a train, new Deputy U.S. Marshal Wyatt Earp and Warren Earp, Doc Holliday, Johnson and Sherman McMaster shot Frank Stilwell as he was lying in wait in the train yard. Justice of the Peace Charles Meyer issued arrest warrants for the Earp posse. He sent a telegram to Tombstone telling Behan they were wanted in Tucson for killing Stilwell. The telegraph office manager was a friend to the Earps and delayed delivery long enough to allow the Earps and their associates to get ready to leave town Tuesday evening. Behan got the telegram in the early evening. He found the men in the lobby of the Cosmopolitan Hotel, heavily armed. He told Wyatt he wanted to see him. Wyatt replied, "Johnny, if you're not careful, you'll see me once too often."

In September 1882, after the Earp Vendetta Ride, Behan had a feud with his own deputy, Billy Breakenridge. An investigation found that Behan had somehow set aside $5,000 in funds while he was sheriff from unknown sources. Due to public and legislative unhappiness with Behan's performance, he was last on the Democratic Party's list of nominees for sheriff, an unusual result for a seated sheriff. Behan failed to gain the nomination and thus left office at the end of his term, in November 1882.

== Later life ==
Behan lived primarily in Tombstone through 1886. In 1887, he moved to Yuma, where he became the assistant superintendent of the Yuma Penitentiary. He killed one of several prisoners who died during a large escape attempt, saving a guard's life. On April 7, 1888, he was promoted to prison superintendent, serving until July 1890. His management of the prison was marked by prison disorder and mismanagement of public funds, generating complaints by the press. The Arizona Republic noted that $50,000 had passed through prison official's hands without any accounting. He faced censure for misuse of public funds and for running the prison in a "coarse and brutal manner" in 1890. The complaint against him specifically cited the prison conditions afforded Manuela Fimbres, a woman incarcerated in the Yuma Prison. She was allowed to roam free within the prison, and she became pregnant, delivered a child, and got pregnant again while he was warden. Former Tombstone resident and writer George W. Parsons commented that he thought Behan was "on the wrong side of the bars".

After twenty-seven years in Arizona, Behan moved east, and in 1891 was in Philadelphia, Pennsylvania, and by 1892 was in a commission business in Washington, D.C. He worked in various government and commissary capacities to the end of his life.

On July 3, 1893, he became an Inspector at Port of Customs at El Paso, Texas. On March 12, 1894, he received a 50 percent pay increase and was elevated to the position of Chinese Exclusion Inspector. (Behan had been a founding member of the "Anti-Chinese League" in Tombstone). For the next several years he traveled throughout the southwest arresting illegal Chinese immigrants. In 1897 he worked in the U.S. Patent Office, until at the outbreak of the Spanish–American War, Behan volunteered for and became corral-master or quartermaster at Tampa, Florida. When this conflict ended, trouble in the Far East began, and in 1900 he served overseas during the Boxer Rebellion.

In 1901, he was living in Willard's Hotel at 1400 Pennsylvania Avenue in Washington, D.C.. The census gave his occupation as "Promoter".

After the war ended, he returned to Tucson in 1901, where he became the business manager for the Tucson Citizen. He then moved to El Paso, Texas, where he worked as a purchasing agent for Texas Bitulithic, a paving company. While in El Paso during 1908, he campaigned for sheriff but lost. On December 14, 1910, the acting governor of Arizona Territory gave him a commission as a railroad policeman in Arizona. He followed that with work supervising survey parties repairing levee breaks on the lower Colorado River. During 1911–12, he was head of the commissary for the Arizona Eastern Railroad.

== Tombstone legacy ==
Long after the gunfight, Behan continued to spread rumors about the Earps. On December 7, 1897, he was quoted in a story in the Washington Post which reported that he was staying at the Riggs House, a local hotel. The story was reprinted by the San Francisco Call, which quoted Behan describing the Earp's lawbreaking behavior in Tombstone.

The Clanton brothers and the McLowrys were a tough lot of rustlers who were the main perpetrators of the rascailly rife in that region. Between them and Earps rose a bitter feud over the division of the proceeds of the looting. The Earp boys believed they had failed to get a fair divide of the booty and swore vengeance. They caught their former allies in Tombstone unarmed and shot three of them dead while their hands were uplifted." Behan went on to say, "They were hauled up before a Justice of the Peace... Warrants were issued for their arrest, and, summoning a posse, I went out to bring the Earps in. They were chased entirely out of the country and Tombstone knew them no more.

== Death and burial ==
Behan died at St. Mary's Catholic Hospital in Tucson, Arizona, on June 7, 1912. His funeral was conducted by the Arizona Pioneers Historical Society, and their eulogy declared, "he held positions of public trust, and in all was active, faithful, and honest." The cause of death was arterial sclerosis, and secondarily syphilis, which he had contracted thirty years earlier (in 1882, while sheriff in Tombstone). The source of some of the information on the death certificate was Behan's son, Albert.

John Behan was buried on the day after his death in Tucson's Holy Hope Cemetery. Enthusiasts of old west history placed a commemorative plaque near the site in 1990.

== Popular culture ==
In the 1993 film Tombstone, Behan (Jon Tenney) introduces himself to Wyatt Earp (Kurt Russell): "Besides sheriff, I'm also tax collector, Captain of the Fire Brigade and Chairman of the Nonpartisan Anti-Chinese League."
