= Doc (film) =

1971 film

- Directed by: Frank Perry
- Written by: Pete Hamill
- Produced by: Frank Perry
- Starring: Stacy Keach; Faye Dunaway; Harris Yulin; Michael Witney
- Cinematography: Enrique Bravo; Gerald Hirschfeld
- Edited by: Alan Heim
- Music by: Jimmy Webb
- Production company: FP Films
- Distributed by: United Artists
- Release date: August 1, 1971
- Running time: 91 minutes
- Country: United States
- Language: English

Doc (stylized as "Doc") is a 1971 American Western film, which tells the story of the Gunfight at the O.K. Corral and of one of its protagonists, Doc Holliday. It stars Stacy Keach, Faye Dunaway, and Harris Yulin. It was directed by Frank Perry. It was the first film of his to not be written by Eleanor Perry; Pete Hamill wrote the original screenplay. The film was shot in Almeria in southern Spain.

== Plot ==
Doc Holliday and Kate Elder meet at a saloon on the road to Tombstone, Arizona. He beats Ike Clanton in a hand of Five Card Stud and wins Kate for the night. The next day they leave together on their journey. Doc tells Kate he's hoping to find his old friend Wyatt Earp who is deputy marshal of Cochise County, and is running to become the town's new sheriff.

Upon arrival, Doc and Kate go their separate ways, with Kate going to work at a brothel and Doc playing cards. Earp shows up and tells Doc they will become rich once he's sheriff with Doc running the gambling in town. Later that night, Wyatt pistol whips Ike and throws him out of the saloon.

Later, Doc becomes smitten with Kate. He goes to the brothel and takes her back to his hotel room. He proclaims he is retiring her and brings her gifts the next day. They eventually move to a house he rents.

A stagecoach robbery leads Wyatt and Doc to the Clanton Ranch looking for Johnny Ringo, who Wyatt believes committed the crime. The Clantons are prepared and draw weapons on them both. Ike challenges Wyatt to a fight, where Ike gets the best of Wyatt. Defeated, Wyatt tells Doc he will kill the Clantons.

Afterwards, Wyatt decides to offer Ike the reward money for the Stagecoach robbery in exchange for Ike delivering Ringo. Wyatt believes he can sew up an election victory over Johnny Behan if he solves the robbery.

Once Wyatt becomes the sheriff, he and his friend face a fierce resistance from the Clanton family, due to Wyatt not being able to get them the reward money. The Cowboys include Ike Clanton, Tom and Frank McLaury, and Billy Claiborne.

Doc teaches the Kid how to shoot a pistol. When the Civil War ended, he left Atlanta, Georgia and went to Richmond, Virginia and then to Baltimore, Maryland, to be a dentist. After some time he decided to go out to the West, looking for a drier environment to cure his tuberculosis, for which he visits a Chinese for herbs. At another point, he is taking laudanum.

In the end, the showdown at the OK Corral takes place during a fiesta. Virgil Earp, Wyatt Earp, and Doc Holliday all survive the gunfight. Ike Clanton, Tom and Frank McClaury, Billy Claiborne and Morgan Earp do not.

== Cast ==
- Stacy Keach as Doc Holliday
- Faye Dunaway as Kate Elder
- Harris Yulin as Wyatt Earp
- Michael Witney as Ike Clanton
- Denver John Collins as The Kid
- Dan Greenburg as John Clum
- John Scanlon as Bartlett
- Richard McKenzie as Sheriff John Behan
- John Bottoms as Virgil Earp
- Ferdinand Zogbaum as James Earp
- Penelope Allen as Mattie Blaylock Earp
- Hedy Sontag as Alley Earp
- James Greene as Frank McLowery
- Antonia Rey as Concha
- Philip Shafer as Morgan Earp
- Fred Dennis as Johnny Ringo

== Reception ==
On review aggregator website Rotten Tomatoes, the film holds an approval rating of 50% based on 10 reviews, with an average rating of 6.4/10.

== Awards ==
- Doc won the 1971 Western Writers of America Spur Award for the Best Movie Script by Peter Hamill.
