= Ten Percent Ring =

Political graft group in Tombstone, Arizona

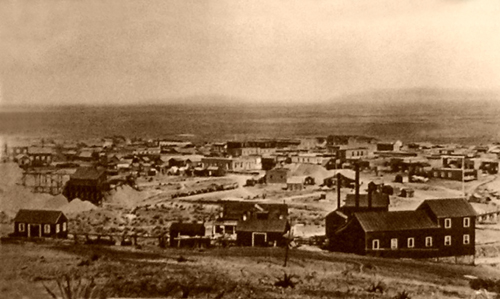
Tombstone in 1881

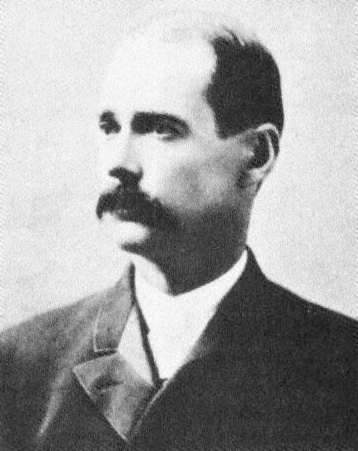
Johnny Behan, a leader of the Tombstone Ten Percent Ring

The Ten Percent Ring was a title given by the newspaper editors of The Tombstone Epitaph in 1881 to Johnny Behan and his friends for stealing about 10% of the local Tombstone, Arizona, taxes in the 1880s. Milt Joyce (1847–1889), owner of the Oriental Saloon and chairman of Cochise County, Arizona, supervisors, was also seen as a leader of the Ten Percent Ring. The Tombstone Epitaph was started by John Clum in 1880.

== Behan's payment from the town's taxation ==
The newspaper outlined the corruption charges of Johnny Behan the Cochise County sheriff. When Johnny Behan was the Cochise County sheriff, one of his duties was collecting prostitution, gambling, liquor, and theater taxes. As part of his pay, he received 10% of all proceeds collected. Much talk in the town arose about the graft political corruption of the sheriff. For this, many saw Behan as the head of the Ten Percent Ring and a friend of the outlaw Cochise County Cowboys. Others accused of membership in the ring was Artemus Fay (?–1906), owner of the Tombstone's first newspaper, the Tombstone Weekly Nugget (1879 to 1882), and Harry Wood (1848–1896), a writer for the Weekly Nugget and an undersheriff of Behan's. Along with stealing tax funds, the Ten Percent Ring helped in election fraud and aiding the outlaw Cochise County Cowboys.

== Conflict with the Earp family ==
Behan was so focused on taxes that he was very soft on crime. Soon after Behan became sheriff, Virgil Earp was appointed Tombstone city marshal and had his brothers Wyatt Earp and Morgan Earp become special deputy policemen. Behan and the Earps were at conflict, as Behan supported the outlaw Clanton and McLaury families. After the Gunfight at the O.K. Corral and the murder of Morgan Earp, Behan did nothing to find his killers. Rather than look for Morgan's killers, Behan put out warrants for U.S. Marshal Virgil Earp and Wyatt for killing outlaws.

== End of Behan's term ==
On January 31, 1882, Behan was arrested for collecting bills totaling $300 twice, arraigned in front of Justice Stilwell, and discharged due to a technicality. Behan failed to win re-election as sheriff in November 1882; he would not serve as a peace officer again. Later, he was appointed as the warden of the Yuma Territorial Prison and had various other government jobs until his death in 1912.

== Departure of Milt Joyce ==
Milt Joyce departed Tombstone in 1883. On October 10, 1880, Joyce and Doc Holliday had a shoot-out at the Oriental. Joyce died in 1889 at the age of 42 in San Francisco, where he was the owner of the Baldwin Billiard Parlor in 1883 and later the Cafe Royal in San Francisco.

== Departures of other associates ==
Harry M. Woods, a Pennsylvania infantry Union veteran, moved to from Tombstone to Nogales, Arizona, where he was a tax collector until his death in 1896. After Artemus Fay departed the Weekly Nugget, which burned in the great fire of 1882 and did not reopen, he worked at the Nugget Mine in Dos Cabezas and started a short-lived paper there, the GoNote. After the death of his wife, Fay moved to Flagstaff and started a newspaper there.

== Popular culture ==
The Ten Percent Ring is a key figure in the much-fictionized TV series The Life and Legend of Wyatt Earp (1955 - 1961), starring Hugh O'Brian in the title role. Steve Brodie played Behan in nine episodes of the series. Douglas Fowley played Doc Holliday.

== See also ==
- Earp Vendetta Ride
- Confederate Arizona
- Arizona Territory in the American Civil War
