= Tombstone, the Town Too Tough to Die =

1942 film

- Theatrical release poster
- Directed by: William C. McGann
- Written by: Albert S. Le Vino (screenplay); Edward E. Paramore Jr. (screenplay); Charles Reisner (story); Dean Riesner (story)
- Based on: Tombstone: An Iliad of the Southwest (1927), by Walter Noble Burns
- Produced by: Harry Sherman
- Starring: Richard Dix; Kent Taylor; Edgar Buchanan; Frances Gifford; Don Castle; Rex Bell
- Edited by: Carroll Lewis; Sherman A. Rose
- Music by: Gerard Carbonara
- Production company: Paramount Pictures
- Distributed by: Paramount Pictures
- Release date: June 13, 1942
- Running time: 79 minutes
- Country: United States
- Language: English

Tombstone, the Town Too Tough to Die is a 1942 American Western film about the Gunfight at the OK Corral. It is directed by William McGann and stars Richard Dix as Wyatt Earp, Kent Taylor as Doc Holliday and Edgar Buchanan as Curly Bill Brocious. The supporting cast features Rex Bell as Virgil Earp and Victor Jory as Ike Clanton.

== Plot ==
Set in the town of Tombstone, Arizona, the plot centers on former gunslinger Wyatt Earp, who helps the sheriff round up criminals. Earp becomes a lawman after he sees an outlaw accidentally kill a child during a showdown. Earp's brothers and Doc Holliday help him take on the outlaw and his gang. More trouble ensues when the sheriff becomes involved with the gang. Earp manages to get them on robbery charges and the situation finally culminates at the infamous O.K. Corral.

== Cast ==
- Richard Dix as Wyatt Earp
- Kent Taylor as Doc Holliday
- Edgar Buchanan as Curly Bill Brocious
- Frances Gifford as Ruth Grant
- Don Castle as Johnny Duane
- Clem Bevans as "Tadpole" Foster
- Victor Jory as Ike Clanton
- Rex Bell as Virgil Earp
- Harvey Stephens as Morgan Earp
- Hal Taliaferro as Dick Mason
- Wallis Clark as Ed Schieffelin
- Donald Curtis as Phineas Clanton
- Dick Curtis as Frank McLowery
- Paul Sutton as Tom McLowery
- Charles Middleton as 1st Mayor
- Charles Stevens as Florentino "Indian Charley" Cruz
- Jack Rockwell as Bob Paul
- Chris-Pin Martin as Chris
- James Ferrara as Billy Clanton
- Charles Halton as Mayor Dan Crane
- Spencer Charters as Judge Fred Horgan
- Emmett Vogan as Editor John Clum (uncredited)

== Reception ==
CBR lists it among its 15 Westerns about Wyatt Earp, indicating it is the shortest of all.
