= Ike Clanton =

Rancher and member of the Cochise County Cowboys (1847–1887)

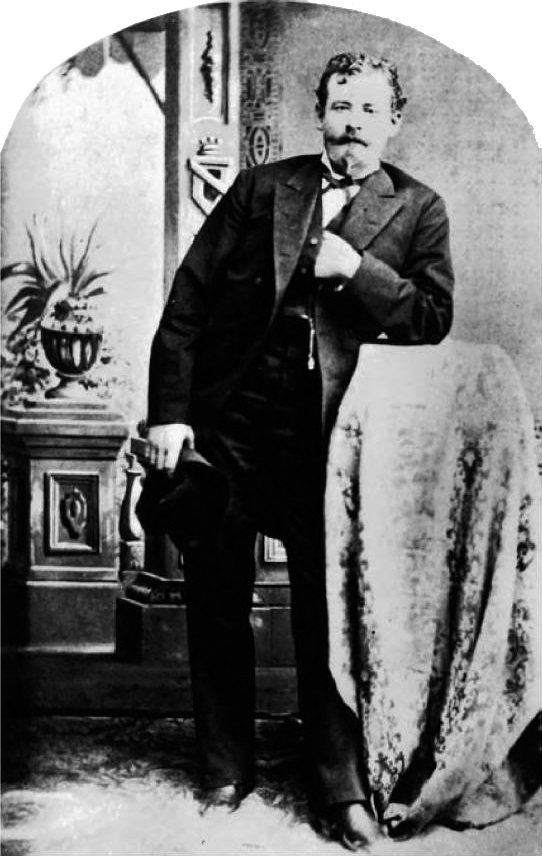
- Ike Clanton, c.1881. Photo by C. S. Fly.
- Born: Joseph Isaac Clanton c. 1847; Callaway County, Missouri, U.S.
- Died: June 1, 1887 (aged 39–40); Springerville, Arizona Territory, U.S.
- Cause of death: Gunshot wound
- Occupations: Ranch hand, miner, outlaw, rustler
- Parent(s): Newman Haynes Clanton and Mariah Sexton Kelso
- Relatives: Brothers Phineas Clanton and Billy Clanton.
- Status: Felony not indicted
- Allegiance: Cochise County Cowboys
- Criminal charges: Murder, cattle rustling

Joseph Isaac Clanton (c. 1847 – June 1, 1887) was an American outlaw who was a member of a loose association known as the Cochise County Cowboys who clashed with lawmen Wyatt, Virgil and Morgan Earp as well as Doc Holliday in Arizona. On October 26, 1881, Clanton was present at the gunfight at the O.K. Corral in the boomtown of Tombstone, Arizona (Arizona Territory), but was unarmed and ran from the gunfight, in which his 19-year-old brother Billy was killed.

Clanton filed murder charges against the Earps and Holliday but after a 30-day preliminary hearing, Justice Wells Spicer ruled that the lawmen had acted within their lawful duty. Clanton was implicated in the attempted assassination of Virgil Earp on December 30, 1881, but other Cowboys provided an alibi and he was released. Six years later Clanton was killed attempting to flee when he was shot by a lawman seeking to arrest him for cattle-rustling.

== Early life ==
Born in Callaway County, Missouri, Joseph Isaac "Ike" Clanton was one of seven children of Newman Haynes Clanton (1816–1881) and his wife Mariah Sexton (Kelso) Clanton. His father worked at times as a day laborer, a gold miner, a farmer, and by the late 1870s, a cattleman in Arizona Territory.

Clanton's mother died in 1866. Ike stayed with the family when they moved to Tombstone, Arizona Territory, around 1877 (before Tombstone became a town or even a mining center). At that time, Newman Clanton was living with his sons Phin (or "Fin"), Ike, and Billy. By 1878 Ike was running a small "lunch counter" at the Tombstone Mill site (now Millville on the San Pedro River—not in modern Tombstone). By 1881, however, he was working on his father's ranch at Lewis Springs, about 12 miles (19 km) west of Tombstone and 5 miles (8.0 km) from Charleston.

The Clantons and their ranch hands and associates were known as the "Cowboys", and they had a reputation for reckless behavior. They were accused of cattle rustling from across the U.S.–Mexican border, as well as other acts of banditry and murder.

== Notoriety, clashes with the Earp lawmen ==
Clanton's notoriety is based largely on his conflict with Wyatt Earp and Wyatt's friend Doc Holliday. The Earps and the Clantons had political, personal, and legal differences and the animosity between them grew throughout 1881. The Cowboys supported incumbent Sheriff Charles Shibell while the Earps supported his opponent Bob Paul in the November 1880 election. Clanton repeatedly boasted in public, drank heavily, and had a quick temper. He was well known for talking too much.

In November 1879, shortly after arriving in Tombstone, Earp had a horse stolen. More than a year later, probably sometime in December 1880, Earp was told the horse was being used near Charleston, and Wyatt and Holliday were forced to ride to the Clanton's ranch near Charleston to await ownership papers in order to legally recover it. According to Wyatt's testimony later, 18-year-old Billy Clanton asked him insolently if he had any more horses to "lose", but he gave the horse up without first being shown the ownership papers, demonstrating to Wyatt that Billy Clanton knew to whom the horse belonged. Sheriff Johnny Behan later testified that the incident had angered Ike Clanton. It also angered Earp.

=== Earp offers Clanton reward money ===
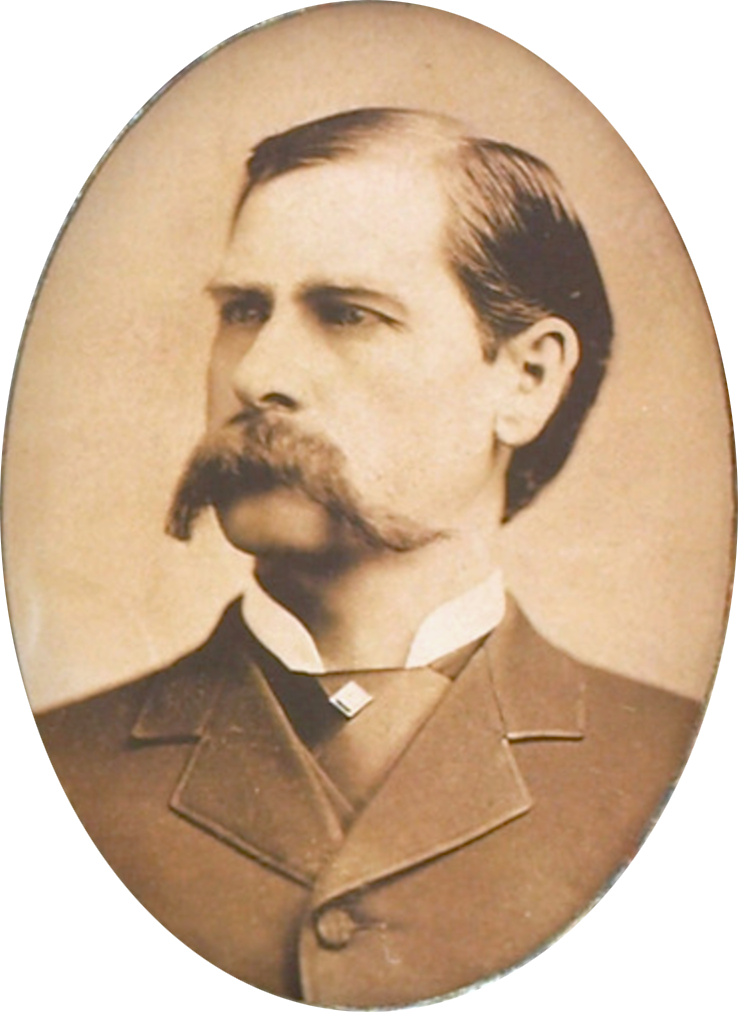
Wyatt Earp

After he was passed over by Johnny Behan for the position of undersheriff, Earp thought he might beat him in the next Cochise County election. He thought catching the March 15, 1881, robbers of the Benson Stage (in which the driver and a passenger were killed) would help him win the sheriff's office. Earp later said that on June 2, 1881, he offered the Wells, Fargo & Co. reward money and more to Clanton if he would provide information leading to the capture or death of the stage robbers. According to Earp, the plan was foiled when the three suspects, Leonard, Head and Crane, were killed in unrelated incidents.

In the summer of 1881, Clanton got into an argument with gambler "Denny" McCann. On the morning of June 9, 1881, they were drinking in an Allen Street saloon when Clanton insulted McCann. McCann slapped Clanton, who left and fetched his pistol. McCann did the same and the two met on the street in front of the Wells Fargo office. They had already drawn their weapons when Tombstone Marshal Virgil Earp stepped between them, preventing a shooting.

== Clanton rustling and ranching ==
The Clanton Ranch grew into a successful enterprise. During his testimony after the shootout at the O.K. Corral, Clanton claimed to have raised and purchased about 700 head of cattle during the past year, and the Clanton ranch was one of the most profitable cattle ranches in that part of the country. However, the Clantons never registered a brand in either Cochise County or Pima County, which was required to legally raise cattle. The Clantons were reputed to be among a group of outlaw Cowboys who crossed the border into Mexico where they stole cattle and re-sold them to the hungry miners in Cochise County. Curly Bill Brocius and Tom and Frank McLaury bought and sold stolen cattle to Old Man Clanton, among others. The Mexican government at the time placed high tariffs on goods transported across the border, making smuggling a profitable enterprise.

The outlaw Cowboys in Cochise County were not organized, and their acts of violence, rustling or robbery were usually committed by independent groups of Cowboys. Newman Haynes Clanton, also known as "Old Man Clanton", Ike's father, ran a ranch near the Mexican border that served as a waystation for much of the smuggling carried out by the outlaws.

On August 12, 1881, Old Man Clanton and six other men were herding stolen cattle sold to him by Curly Bill Brocius through Guadalupe Canyon near the Mexican border. Around dawn, they were ambushed by Mexicans dispatched by Commandant Felipe Neri in the Guadalupe Canyon Massacre. Old Man Clanton and five other men were killed in the ambush.

== Gunfight in Tombstone ==
Clanton had told others that Doc Holliday, Virgil Earp, Wyatt Earp, and Morgan Earp had all confided in him that they had actually been involved in the Benson stage robbery. On October 25, 1881, while Clanton was in Tombstone, drunk and very loud, Holliday accused him of lying about the Benson stagecoach robbery. Tombstone City Marshal Virgil Earp intervened and threatened to arrest both Holliday and Clanton if they did not stop arguing, and Holliday went home.

After the confrontation with Clanton, Wyatt Earp took Holliday back to his boarding house at Camillus Sidney "Buck" Fly's Lodging House to sleep off his drinking, then went home and to bed. Tombstone Marshal Virgil Earp played cards with Clanton, Tom McLaury, Cochise County Sheriff Johnny Behan and a fifth man (unknown to Clanton and to history), until morning.

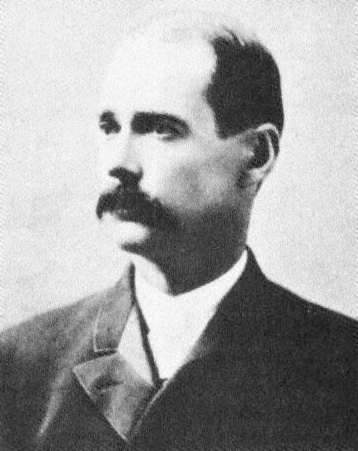
Sheriff Johnny Behan

At about dawn on October 26, the card game broke up and Behan and Virgil Earp went home to bed. Clanton testified later that he saw Virgil take his six-shooter out of his lap and stick it in his pants when the game ended. Not having rented a room, McLaury and Clanton had no place to go. Shortly after 8:00 am barkeeper E. F. Boyle spoke to Clanton, who had been drinking all night, in front of the telegraph office. Boyle encouraged him to get some sleep, but Clanton insisted he would not go to bed. Boyle later testified he noticed Clanton was armed and covered his gun for him, recalling that Clanton told him "'As soon as the Earps and Doc Holliday showed themselves on the street, the ball would open—that they would have to fight' ... I went down to Wyatt Earp's house and told him that Ike Clanton had threatened that when him and his brothers and Doc Holliday showed themselves on the street that the ball would open." Clanton said in his testimony afterwards that he remembered neither meeting Boyle nor making any such statements that day.

Later in the morning, Clanton picked up his rifle and single-action revolver from the West End Corral, where he had stabled his wagon and team and deposited his weapons after entering town. By noon that day, Clanton, drinking again and armed, told others he was looking for Holliday or an Earp. At about 1:00 pm, Virgil and Morgan Earp surprised Clanton on 4th Street where Virgil pistol whipped him from behind. Disarming him, the Earps took Clanton to appear before Judge Wallace for violating the city's ordinance #9 against carrying firearms in the city. Virgil Earp went to find Judge Wallace so the court hearing could be held."

Clanton reported in his testimony afterward that Wyatt Earp cursed him. He said Wyatt, Virgil, and Morgan Earp offered him his rifle and to fight him right there in the courthouse, which Clanton declined. Clanton also denied ever threatening the Earps. Clanton was fined $25 plus court costs and after paying the fine left unarmed. Virgil Earp told Clanton he would leave Clanton's confiscated rifle and revolver at the Grand Hotel which was favored by Cowboys when in town. Clanton testified that he picked up the weapons from William Soule, the jailer, a couple of days later.

At around 1:30–2:00 pm, after Tom McLaury had been pistol-whipped by Wyatt, Clanton's 19-year-old younger brother Billy Clanton and Tom's older brother Frank McLaury arrived in town. They had heard from their neighbor, Ed Frink, that Clanton had been stirring up trouble in town overnight, and they had ridden into town on horseback to back up their brothers. They arrived from Antelope Springs, 13 miles (21 km) east of Tombstone, where they had been rounding up livestock with their brothers and had breakfasted with Clanton and Tom McLaury the day before. Both Frank McLaury and Billy Clanton were each armed with a revolver and a rifle, as was the custom for riders in the country outside Tombstone. Apache warriors had engaged the U.S. Army near Tombstone just three weeks before the O.K. Corral gunfight, so the need for weapons outside of town was well established and accepted.

Billy and Frank stopped first at the Grand Hotel on Allen Street, and were greeted by Doc Holliday. They learned immediately after of their brothers' beatings by the Earps within the previous two hours. The incidents had generated a lot of talk in town. Angrily, Frank said he would not drink, and he and Billy left the saloon immediately to seek Tom. By law, both Frank and Billy should have left their firearms at the Grand Hotel. Instead, they remained fully armed. The city statute was not specific about how far a recently arrived visitor might "with good faith, and within reasonable time" travel into town while carrying a firearm. This permitted a traveler to keep his firearms if he was proceeding directly to a livery, hotel or saloon.

A man named Coleman told Virgil that the Cowboys had left the Dunbar and Dexter Stable for the O.K. Corral and were still armed, and Virgil decided they had to disarm them. The three main Tombstone corrals were all west of 4th street, a block or two from where Wyatt saw the Cowboys buying cartridges.

Cochise County Sheriff Johnny Behan, a friend to the Cowboys, later testified that he first learned of the trouble while he was getting a shave at the barbershop after 1:30 pm, which is when he had risen after the late-night game. Behan stated he immediately went to locate the Cowboys. At about 2:30 pm he saw both Clantons and both McLaurys gathered off Fremont street in a narrow 15–20 feet (4.6–6.1 m) wide empty lot or alley immediately west of 312 Fremont Street, which contained Fly's 12-room boarding house and photography studio. The lot was six lots removed from the rear entrance to the O.K. Corral.

When Virgil Earp learned that Wyatt was talking to the Cowboys at Spangenberg's gun shop he picked up a 10-gauge or 12-gauge, short, double-barreled shotgun from the Wells Fargo office around the corner on Allen Street. To avoid alarming Tombstone's public, Virgil returned to Hafford's Saloon carrying the shotgun under his long overcoat. He gave the shotgun to Doc Holliday who hid it under his overcoat. He took Holliday's walking-stick in return. From Spangenberg's, the Cowboys moved to the O.K. Corral where witnesses overheard them threatening to kill the Earps. They then walked a block north to an empty lot next to C. S. Fly's boarding house where Doc Holliday lived.

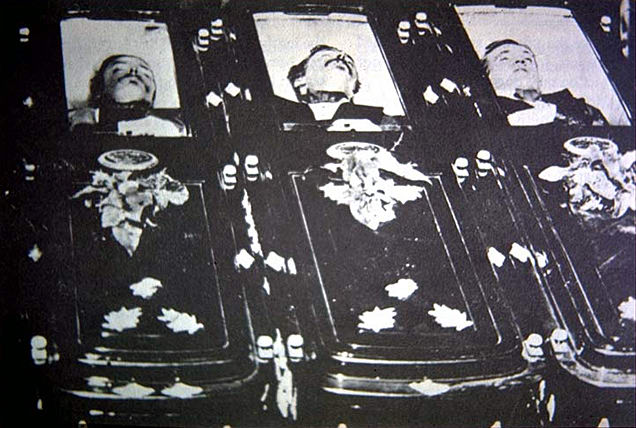
The coffins of Tom and Frank McLaury, with Billy Clanton's coffin on the right

Virgil Earp was told by several citizens that the McLaurys and the Clantons had gathered on Fremont Street and were armed. He decided he had to act. Several members of the citizen's vigilance committee offered to support him with arms, but Virgil said no. He had previously deputized Morgan and Wyatt and also deputized Doc Holliday that morning. Wyatt spoke of his brothers Virgil and Morgan as the "marshals" while he acted as "deputy".

Witnesses later testified that Ike Clanton had spent all day, even after his arrest and disarming, threatening to gun down the Earps. However, when the gunfight broke out, Clanton ran forward and grabbed Wyatt, exclaiming that he was unarmed and did not want a fight. To this protest Wyatt said he responded, "Go to fighting or get away!"." Clanton ran through the front door of Fly's boarding house and escaped, unwounded.

In the days before the gunfight, Clanton had enlisted the help of fellow Cowboy Billy Claiborne, who was reputed to be good with a gun. Claiborne, who was also unarmed, fled the gunfight. Tom and Frank McLaury and Billy Clanton were killed.

== Files murder charges against Earps ==
After the gunfight in Tombstone, during which the McLaury brothers and Billy Clanton were killed, Ike Clanton filed murder charges against the Earps and Doc Holliday. They were arrested and released on bail. During a month-long preliminary hearing before Judge Wells Spicer, Clanton told a story of abuse that he had suffered at the hands of the Earps and Holliday the night before the gunfight. He denied having threatened the Earps. He testified that the Clantons and Frank McLaury raised their hands after Virgil's command, and Tom thrust open his vest to show he was unarmed. Clanton said Wyatt shoved his revolver in his belly, telling him, "You son-of-a-bitch, you can have a fight!".

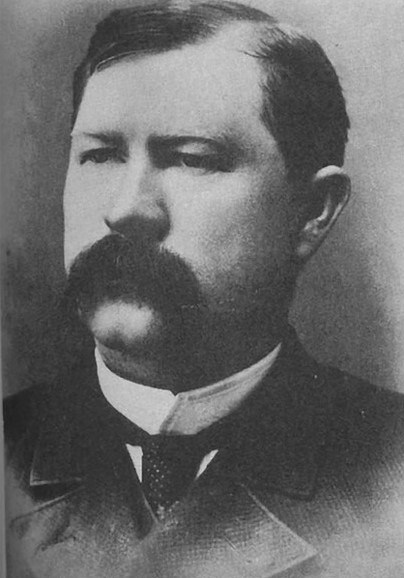
Virgil Earp

Clanton backed up Cochise County Sheriff Johnny Behan's testimony that Holliday and Morgan Earp had fired the first two shots and that the next several shots also came from the Earp party. Under cross-examination, Clanton told a story of the lead-up to the gunfight that did not make sense. He said the Benson stage robbery was concocted by the Earps and Holliday to cover up money they had "piped off" to pay bribes. Clanton also claimed that Doc Holliday and Morgan, Wyatt, and Virgil Earp had separately confessed to him their role in the Benson stage holdup, or else the cover-up of the robbery by allowing the robbers' escape.

Clanton proved a better witness for the defense than the prosecution. He said that Doc Holliday, Virgil Earp, Wyatt Earp, and Morgan Earp had all confided in him that they had actually been involved in the stage robbery. He further claimed that Holliday had told him that Holliday had "piped off" money from the stage before it left (although no money was missing, and the stage had not been successfully robbed). Clanton also said Holliday had confessed to him about killing the stage driver. Murder was a capital offense, and given their relationship, it was unlikely Holliday would confide in Clanton. Clanton testified that Earp had threatened to kill his confederates because he feared they would reveal his part in the robbery. Clanton said he feared that Wyatt wanted to kill him because he knew of Wyatt's role. These and other inconsistencies in Clanton's testimony lacked credibility. By the time Clanton finished his testimony, the entire prosecution case had become suspect.

Judge Spicer exonerated the lawmen. In his ruling, he noted that Clanton had the night before, while unarmed, publicly declared that the Earp brothers and Holliday had insulted him, and that when he was armed he intended to shoot them or fight them on sight. On the morning of the shooting, Virgil Earp had arrested him for carrying a revolver. At the gunfight, he was unarmed. Spicer noted that Clanton had claimed the Earps were out to murder him, yet on both occasions that day the Earps had not killed him, and allowed him to escape unchallenged during the fight. Spicer wrote, "the great fact, most prominent in the matter, to wit, that Isaac Clanton was not injured at all, and could have been killed first and easiest."

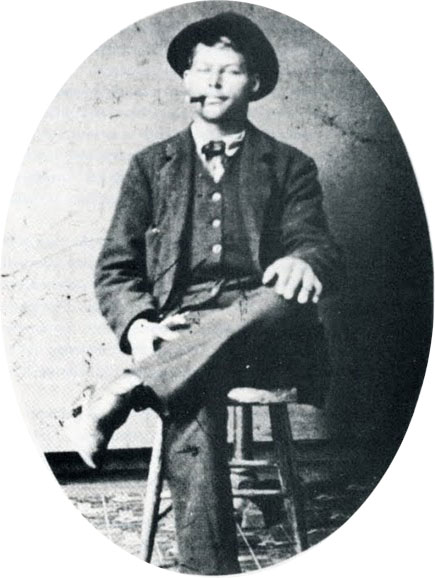
Frank Stillwell

Clanton was later accused, along with his brother, Phin Clanton, and friend Pony Diehl, of attempting to kill Virgil Earp on December 30, 1881, a shooting which left Virgil with a crippled left arm. Though Ike Clanton's hat was found at the scene where the ambushers waited, a number of associates stood up for him, saying that he had been in Contention that night, and the case was dismissed for lack of evidence.

On Saturday, March 18, 1882, Morgan Earp was killed by a shot through a door window facing a dark alley while playing billiards at Hatch's Saloon in Tombstone. Wyatt was shot at and missed. Wyatt Earp concluded that he could not rely on civil justice and decided to take matters into his own hands. He concluded that only way to deal with Morgan's murderers was to kill them.

Deputy U.S. Marshal Wyatt Earp led a federal posse that escorted Virgil Earp to the railroad, bound for his parents’ home in Colton, California. Wyatt shot and killed Frank Stilwell, who was lying in wait at the Tucson, Arizona, rail yard. A few days later Wyatt gathered a larger posse and set out on a vendetta, determined to mete out justice that had evaded him. Wyatt never located Clanton, although they killed three other outlaw Cowboys, and the Earps and Holliday left the Arizona Territory in late April 1882.

== Later life ==
After the gunfight at the O.K. Corral, the Clantons bought land near a ranch owned by their sister Mary. Phin arrived in June and Ike in August 1882. By 1885, each had a 160-acre ranch 10 miles east of Springerville near the New Mexico border.

By 1885, the Clanton gang included Lee Renfro, G. W. "Kid" Swingle, Longhair Sprague, Billy Evans, and Clanton's brother-in-law, Ebin Stanley. They moved their operations to a ranch they named the Cienega Amarilla, near Springerville, Arizona. On November 6, 1885, local rancher Isaac Ellinger and Pratt Plummer had dinner with the Clanton brothers and Lee Renfro. After the meal, Ike, Renfro, and Ellinger went into a cabin on the Clanton ranch when for unknown reasons Renfro shot and killed Ellinger.

Ellinger's older brother William Ellinger was one of the biggest cattlemen in the West with ranches in several states and territories. William learned that his brother had lived four days, long enough to call the shooting "coldblooded murder". William and Isaac were members of the Apache County Stock Association and William had a lot of political clout.

On December 25, 1886—Christmas Day—Evans, wanting to see "if a bullet would go through a Mormon", shot and killed Jim Hale in cold blood. The Clantons had been suspected for some time of rustling cattle, taking stolen livestock from the Springerville area to Clifton and southern Arizona by way of the Blue River down to Eagle Creek.

In April 1887, the Apache County Stock Association met and hired a Pinkerton detective to track down the outlaws. They also hired Jonas "Jake" V. Brighton as a “secret service” officer. Brighton was a constable in Springerville and a range detective.

In April, 1887, Phin Clanton was arrested for rustling and jailed in St. Johns. During May and June 1887, several grand jury indictments were brought against the Clantons and their friends. The indictments included charges of cattle-rustling and murder for the death of Isaac Ellinger.

Brighton pursued Clanton. After three days, he spent the night of May 31, 1887, at Jim "Peg Leg" Wilson's Ranch on Eagle Creek, south of Springerville. The next morning Clanton rode up and Brighton recognized him. Clanton turned his horse to run and drew his rifle from his scabbard. Brighton fired his rifle first, shooting Clanton through the left side, the bullet exiting out the right. Clanton died before he hit the dirt.

A reporter who corresponded with Brighton in late June 1887 relayed Brighton's story about the arrest and shooting:

The next morning, while they were at breakfast, Ike Clanton came riding up to the front door. Mr. Brighton got up from the table, walked to the door, and was familiarly saluted by him. Just at this time, Mr. Miller stepped to the door, to be ready to render any assistance needed, and when Ike saw him he wheeled his horse and attempted to get under cover of the thick cover which grows close to Wilson's home, at the same time pulling his Winchester from its scabbard. Both Brighton and Miller ordered him to halt but instead of doing so, when about twenty yards distant where the trail took a turn to the left, he threw his rifle over his left arm attempting to fire; at this instance Detective Brighton fired, the ball entering under the left arm and passing directly through the heart and out under the right arm. Ike reeled in his saddle and fell on the right side of his horse, his rifle falling on the left. Before the fall, Brighton fired a second shot which passed through the cantle of the saddle and grazed Ike's right leg. When Brighton and Miller walked up to where Ike lay they found he was dead. Mr. Wilson, at whose ranch the shooting occurred, notified the nearest neighbors and four men came over and identified the deceased and assisted in giving him as decent a burial as circumstances would admit.

A conflicting source stated that his body was left where it fell for several days until nearby Mormon ranchers buried him in an unmarked grave in the Mormon cemetery southeast of Eagar, Arizona, on what is today called "The 26 Bar Ranch". Some modern writers wonder if Brighton simply used resisting arrest as an excuse to explain his assassination of Clanton.

In late June 1996 a Clanton family descendant, Terry "Ike" Clanton, along with former Citadel professor and grave expert James A. Browning, searched the area near Eagle Creek in what is now Greenlee County, Arizona, where Ike was reportedly buried. They quickly discovered a shallow grave under a large tree that they believe contains the remains of Ike Clanton. Since their discovery, Terry has unsuccessfully tried to interest Tombstone city officials in exhuming the remains and re-interring them in Tombstone's famous Boot Hill graveyard.

== Portrayals in film and television ==
Clanton has been portrayed in a number of films and television series since the 1940s, many of which were highly fictionalized.

Clanton was played by Victor Jory in Tombstone, the Town Too Tough to Die (1942). Clanton was portrayed by Grant Withers in the John Ford classic My Darling Clementine (1946). Lyle Bettger portrayed Clanton as a brutal thug in John Sturges' film Gunfight at the O.K. Corral (1957). In Sturges' sequel, Hour of the Gun (1967), he is portrayed by Robert Ryan as a sophisticated man. Clanton appears in the Doctor Who story "The Gunfighters" (1966), played by William Hurndell, which is largely based on the Sturges film.

In 1957, Kelo Henderson played Clanton in an episode of Dale Robertson's NBC series, Tales of Wells Fargo. From 1959 to 1960, the actor John Milford portrayed Clanton in eight episodes of the ABC/Desilu television series, The Life and Legend of Wyatt Earp. He was later replaced in the role by Rayford Barnes. Clanton was played by William Tannen in the episode "After the OK Corral" of the syndicated western anthology series, Death Valley Days.

In the original Star Trek series episode "Spectre of the Gun" (1969), Captain James T. Kirk (William Shatner) plays the part of Clanton throughout the episode as part of an alien illusion test. DeForest Kelley (Dr. Leonard McCoy) also played Clanton in an episode of the CBS television series You Are There prior to Star Trek.

Michael Witney played Clanton in Doc (1971). Stephen Lang played Clanton in the movie Tombstone (1993), which draws heavily on the Billy Breakenridge book Helldorado: Bringing the Law to the Mesquite. In the film, Clanton is portrayed as being second-in-command of the Clanton Gang. Jeff Fahey played Clanton in the movie Wyatt Earp (1994), starring Kevin Costner as Wyatt Earp. Christopher Fulford played him in 2007 in the BBC drama-documentary Gunfight at the O.K. Corral.

== See also ==
- Ten Percent Ring
