= Tip Top, Arizona =

Ghost town in Yavapai County, Arizona

- Ghost town
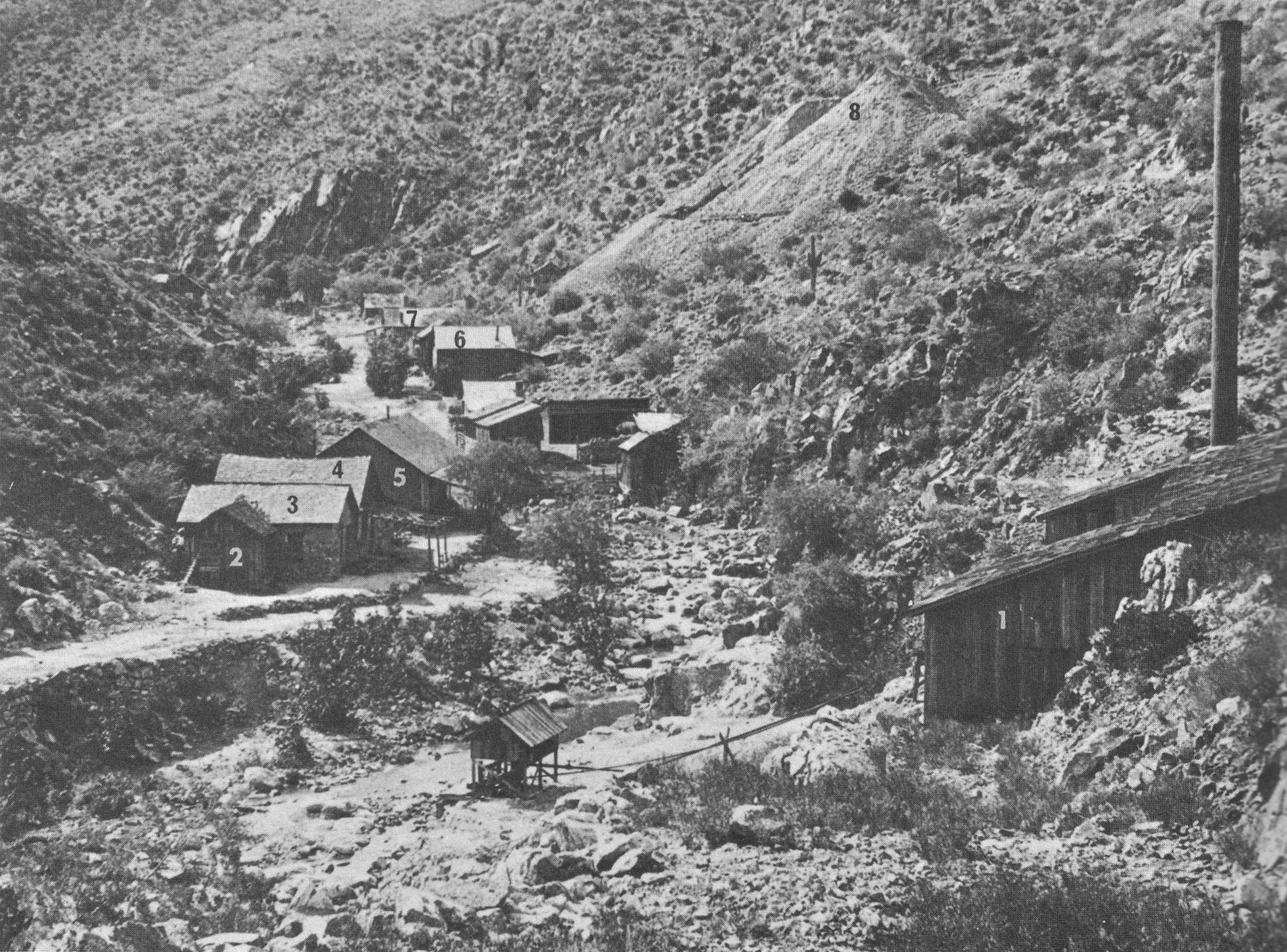
- Northern end of Tip Top, circa 1888

- Location within Arizona Location within the United States
- Coordinates: 34°03′03″N 112°14′49″W
- Country: United States
- State: Arizona
- County: Yavapai
- Founded: 1876
- Abandoned: 1895
- Elevation: 2,510 ft (770 m)

Population (2009)
  - Total: 0
- Time zone: UTC-7 (MST (no DST))
- GNIS feature ID: 1669455

Tip Top is a ghost town in Yavapai County in the U.S. state of Arizona. The town was settled in 1876 in what was then the Arizona Territory.

== History ==
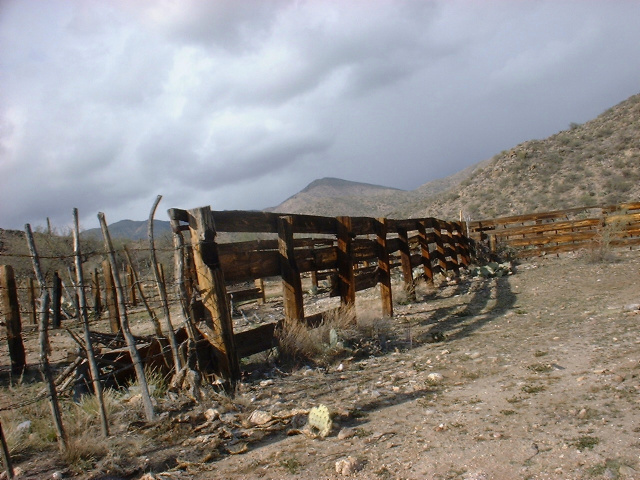
Old corral at Tip Top, Arizona

Primarily a silver-mining town, it had a post office from August 12, 1880, until February 14, 1895. The town was founded after Jack Moore and Bill Corning struck a significant lode of silver in 1875.

The nearby ghost town of Gillett was the original mill site for the ore from the Tip Top mine.

Tip Top at its peak had over 500 residents and was one of the largest towns in Arizona at the time.

Tip Top's population was 65 in 1890.

Many ruins still exist in Tip Top today.

Tip Top is the setting for The Nightjar Women, the last story in the weird western anthology Merkabah Rider: Tales of a High Planes Drifter by Edward M. Erdelac.
