= Billy Breakenridge =

Figure in the American Old West (1846–1931)

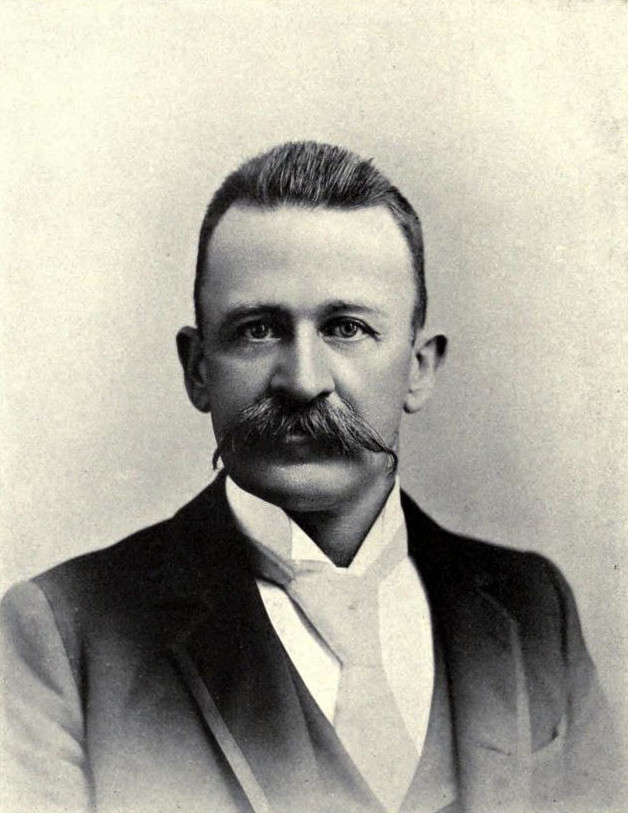
- Born: William Milton Breakenridge; December 25, 1846; Watertown, Wisconsin, US
- Died: January 31, 1931 (aged 84); Tucson, Arizona, US
- Known for: Lawman in the American Old West and author of Helldorado: Bringing the Law to the Mesquite

William Milton Breakenridge (December 25, 1846 – January 31, 1931) was an American lawman, teamster, railroader, soldier and author.

== Early life ==
Breakenridge was born in Watertown, Wisconsin, to George D. and Elisa Ann Breakenridge. United States Census records from 1850 and 1860 indicate that he had an older brother, an older sister, and a younger sister.

After leaving Wisconsin at the age of 16, Breakenridge joined the United States Army, eventually serving under Colonel John Chivington with the Colorado Territorial Militia during the Sand Creek Massacre (also known as the Chivington massacre). Following his stint with the army, he moved on to Arizona, eventually ending up in Phoenix where he became a Maricopa County deputy sheriff.

== Tombstone, Arizona ==
After staying in Phoenix for about a year, Breakenridge went south to Cochise County and the growing mining town of Tombstone. He served as a deputy sheriff under Cochise County Sheriff Behan during the 1880s at the time of the Gunfight at the O.K. Corral. A number of old-west historians consider Breakenridge, like his boss Behan, to have been a friend to the local outlaw cowboys. Ike Clanton filed murder charges against Wyatt, Virgil and Morgan Earp along with Doc Holliday for killing Billy Clanton, Frank McLaury and Tom McLaury in the shoot out.

== Later life and Helldorado ==
After leaving Tombstone shortly after the gunfight at the OK Corral, Breakenridge later served as a deputy U.S. marshal, a surveyor, and as a claims agent for the Southern Pacific Railroad. In the fall of 1889, he led an expedition to discover reservoir sites in the mountains of Arizona, the other members being James H. McClintock and John R. Norton. They discovered and were the first to plat the site of the Roosevelt dam.

In 1927 Wyatt Earp returned to Tucson, likely for the last time, and met with Breakenridge at the Old Pueblo Club. While the purpose of the meeting remains unknown, it might have been to informally obtain information from Earp, for Breakenridge's future book.

In 1928, he became a published author with the release of his memoirs of life in Tombstone and the old west, Helldorado: Bringing the Law to the Mesquite. Critics of the book, including Wyatt Earp and his wife Josie, claimed that much of what Breakenridge wrote was biased and more fiction than factual. Although Breakenridge met with Earp in Los Angeles to interview him, the picture he painted of Earp was less than flattering.

Portrayed as a thief, pimp, crooked gambler, and murderer, Earp loudly protested the book's contents until his death in 1929, and his wife continued in the same vein afterward. Nonetheless, the book was a success and generated so much interest that Tombstone's citizens joined together in 1929 to create an annual October celebration, Helldorado Days, commemorating the gunfight at the OK Corral. The celebration continues today.

== Death ==
Breakenridge died before dawn from cardiac failure on January 31, 1931, aged 84, in Tucson, Arizona. His death certificate stated that he had previously undergone surgery for cardiac problems. He is buried in Evergreen Cemetery in Tucson.
