= The Tombstone Epitaph =

Monthly journal in Tombstone, Arizona

Coordinates: 31°42′46″N 110°03′58″W

- "No Tombstone is complete without its epitaph"
- Cover of the December 31, 1922 edition
- Type: Monthly newspaper
- Owner(s): Tombstone Epitaph, Inc.
- Founder(s): John Clum; Thomas Sorin
- Editor: Mark Boardman
- Founded: May 1, 1880
- Language: English
- Headquarters: 11 South Fifth Street; Tombstone, AZ 85638-1880
- Circulation: 7,000
- ISSN: 2157-6777
- Website: tombstoneepitaph.com

The Tombstone Epitaph is the oldest continually published newspaper in Arizona. In 1880, it began publication in Tombstone, Arizona, and notably its editor John Clum documented the infamous Gunfight at the O.K. Corral, sharing his articles with news wires which helped mythologize Wyatt Earp, Doc Holliday and their outlaw adversaries, the Cochise County Cowboys, in American culture.

In 1973, the paper's owners launched a national edition which featured republished historical articles and history essays aimed at tourists. In 1975, the local edition, a traditional community paper, was donated to the University of Arizona to be produced by students.

== History ==
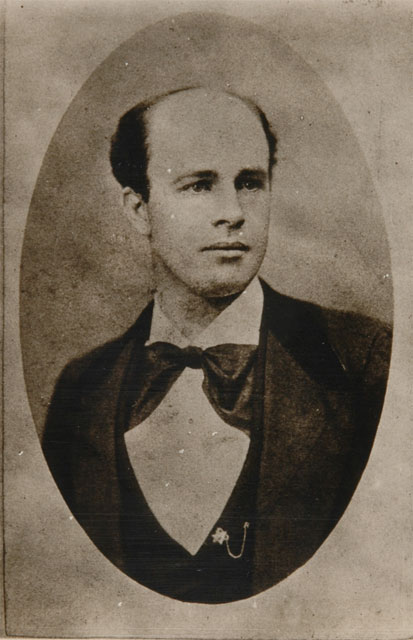
John P. Clum c. 1880

=== John Clum and the Earps ===
On Saturday, May 1, 1880, John P. Clum and Thomas Sorin published the first edition of The Tombstone Epitaph. Charles D. Reppy joined the firm later that year. In its inaugural editorial, Clum wrote "No tombstone is complete without its epitaph, and so we have come to fill the void and make all happy in the consequent perfection."

Clum's friends, including John Wasson, thought the name "epitaph" would kill the paper, but the publisher took pride in the morbid title. On the name, the Tucson Citizen wrote: "The melancholy name which the proprietors have adopted is a source of much merriment, and the infinite variety of 'jokes' which have been perpetrated since its appearance would have paralyzed any other man than genial Mr. Clum."

At that time Tombstone was a silver mining boomtown. Under Clum, the Epitaph was pro-Republican and friendly toward businesses and the Earp brothers. The paper was a rival of The Daily Nugget, which was pro-Democratic and friendly toward ranchers and the cowboys. In 1881, Clum became mayor and later that year his coverage of the Gunfight at the O.K. Corral heavily favored the Earps and Doc Holliday. In 1882, Clum sold his interest in the paper and left Tombstone.

=== Other owners ===
On May 1, 1882, Judge Samuel Purdy Jr. of the Yuma Free Press acquired the Epitaph from Clum and Reppy. He then switched its affiliation to Democratic. In September 1882, Purdy challenged Patrick Hamilton, editor of the Arizona Independent, to a duel. The two met in Mexico but their associates called it off after disagreeing over which pistols to use. In 1883, Reppy resumed control of the Epitaph.

In 1884, Reppy bought the Tombstone Republican and absorbed it into his paper. In 1891, Stanley C. Bagg, owner of a rival paper called the Daily Prospector, acquired the Epitaph and turned it into the Sunday edition of his daily paper. In 1895, Bagg sold the paper to Hattich, who in 1913 sold it to brothers Columbus P., Carmel L. and George Giragi.

In February 1924, the daily Prospector was discontinued and converted into a weekly under the Epitaph masthead. In January 1926, the Giragi brothers acquired The Winslow Mail, and soon sold off The Epitaph. The paper was acquired by William H. Kelley in March 1926, Walter H. Cole in 1930, and Clayton A. Smith in 1938.

Journalism professor Douglas D. Martin authored Tombstone's Epitaph in 1951, a book on the town's history with info sourced from archived newspapers, rediscovering early editions of the Epitaph thought lost. At the time the book was considered the most complete and authentic on the subject, and a full day celebration and book signing was held in town.

Clayton died in a plane crash in January 1964. His widow Mable A. Smith then published the paper, but sold it that August to Historic Tombstone Adventures, a company headed by Harold O. Love and including three other investors. The sale price was $70,000. Gordon R. Peterson was named editor, but he was replaced by Wayne Winters in December.

=== Relaunch ===
The owners of Historic Tombstone Adventure aimed to invest in historic properties in order to turn Tombstone into a tourist attraction. To that end, in September 1965, The Epitaph was redesigned, reverted to its historic layout and font under the guidance of the Tombstone Historical Society. Moving forward, the paper would republish archived stories written during the American Old West along with present-day weather forecasts and current events.

In 1973, the company launched a quarterly historical journal aimed at tourists. At that time the weekly Epitaph had a circulation of 1,200. Wallace E. Clayton, one of the four company investors, edited the journal and printed it off of Linotype machine. Aside from Clayton's own writing, early editions consisted of republished articles from old Epitaph editions and from old magazines. Slowly he assembled a group of 30 volunteer writers who wrote about various topics related to the Old West. In 1974, the historical edition increased publication to monthly.

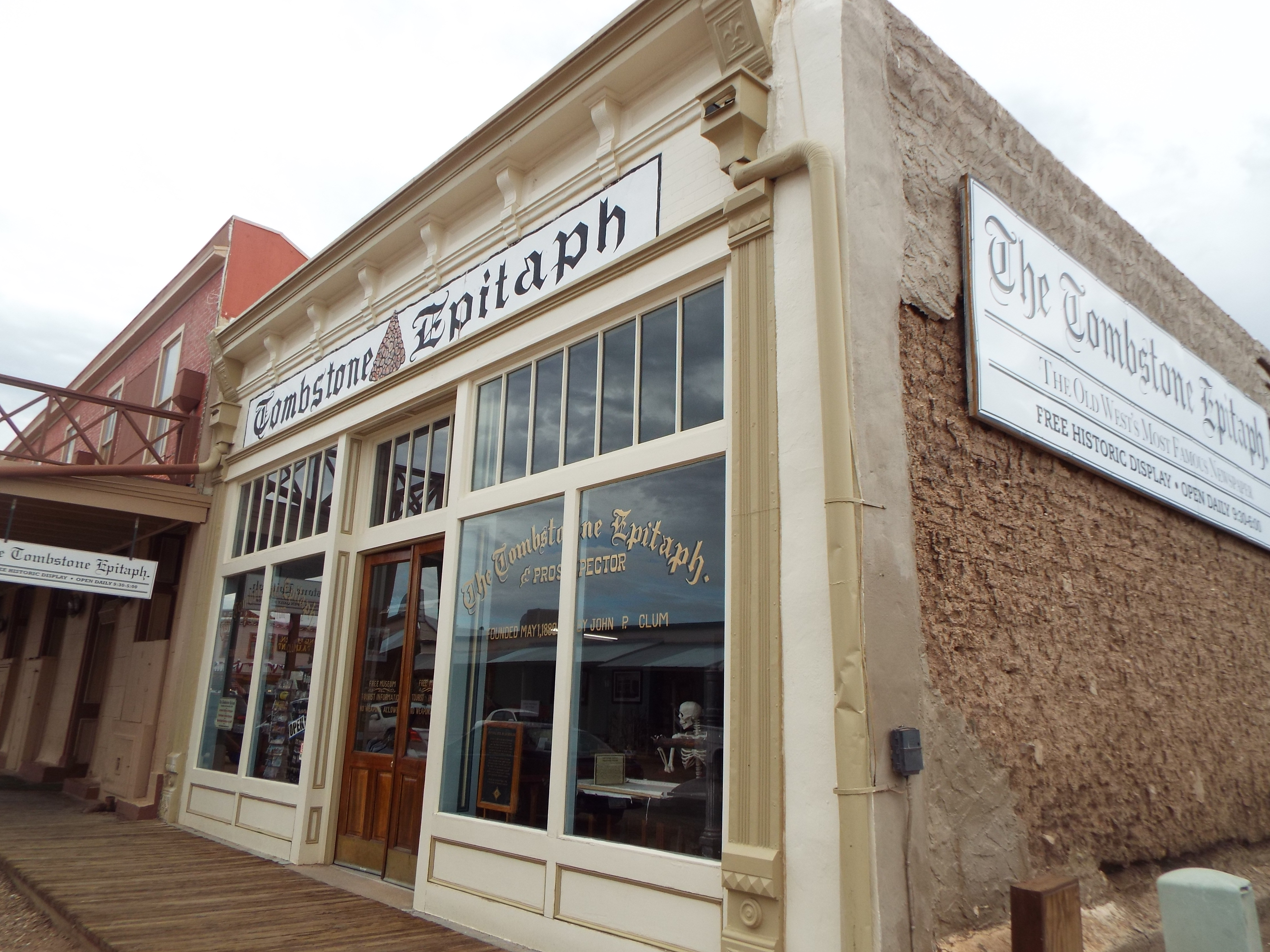
Tombstone Epitaph Building

By 1975, the historic national edition proved more popular with 3,700 subscribers across 49 U.S. states and 32 countries, compared to the local edition with 400 subscribers. Love said his staff struggled to give attention to two publications and balance the needs of both local readers and fans of western history. He considered shuttering the weekly, but instead met with the journalism department at the University of Arizona. An agreement was reached, and the local edition was donated to the UA to be published bi-weekly by a staff of 15 students. However, the Associated Press wrote an article with a headline that mislead readers into believing the Epitaph had ceased entirely. A follow up piece was written to clarify, but not before Love received 5,100 letters from concerned fans offering to help save the paper.

On March 7, 1975, students resumed management of The Epitaph, working from their school's campus in Tucson located 75 miles from Tombstone. The paper was still printed in the "Old West Style" by journalism students in the class "Journalism 450: The Tombstone Epitaph," which became required for graduation. The school rented an apartment in Tombstone where one or two students lived during their three-day shifts covering local news. Stories were then typed up with computers back at campus. The program, possibly the first of its kind in the U.S., received grant funding from Reader's Digest and Scripps Howard Foundation.

By 1995, circulation for the national edition had grown to 8,000 and the paper turned a modest profit. Contributing writers were still unpaid, but received a stipend at the year's end if the paper turned a profit. In 1996, the Society of Professional Journalists declared the Epitaph a "National Historic Site in Journalism." Clayton continued to publish the national edition until his death in 1998 at age 77.

== Museum ==
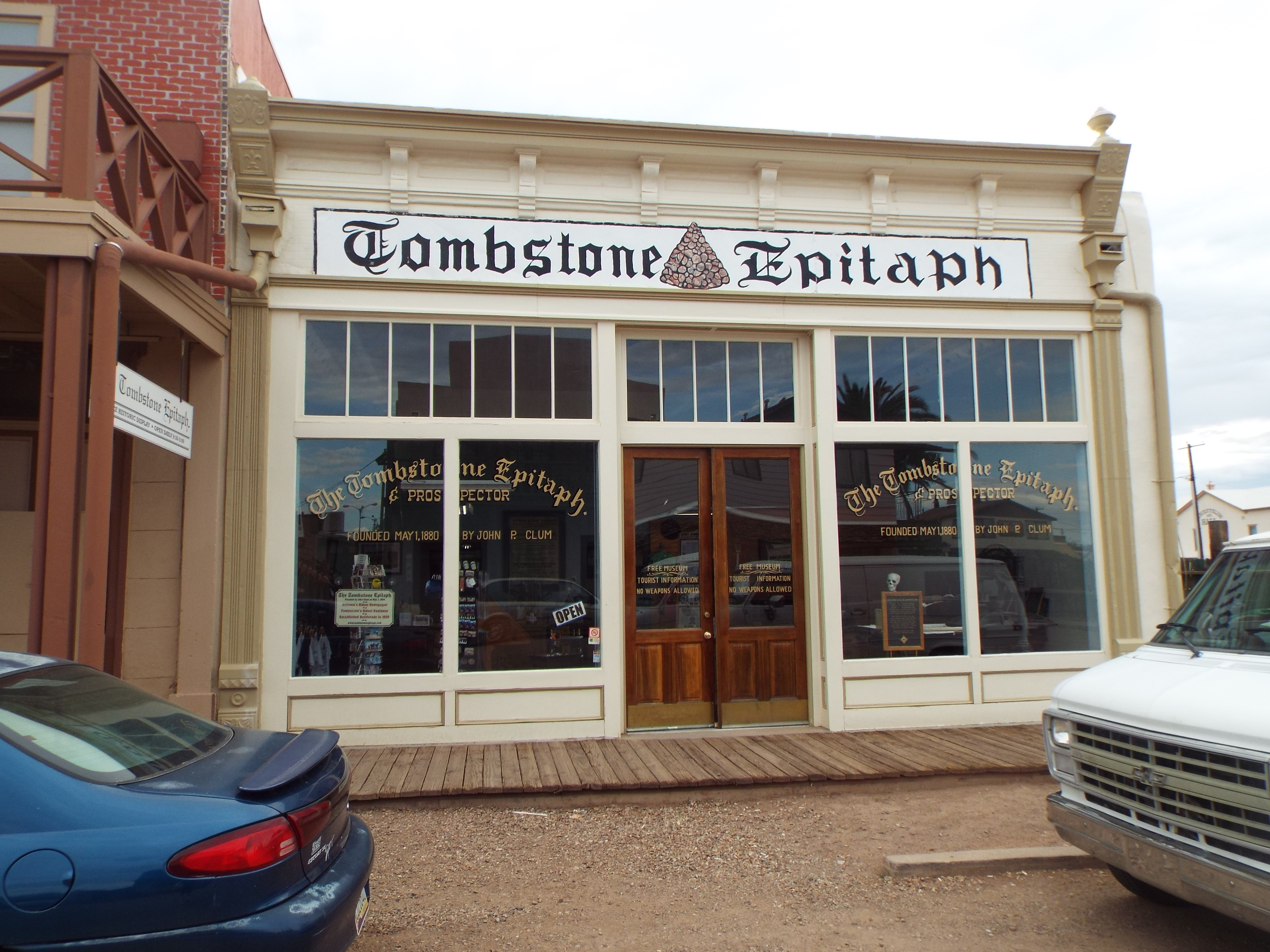
Tombstone Epitaph Building

The Epitaph office in the Tombstone Historic District welcomes visitors from 9:30 a.m. and 5 p.m. daily. Inside of Tombstone's oldest continually operated business, visitors can watch a free video presentation on printing in the 1880s, view a Washington flat bed press on which early issues of The Epitaph were printed, explore a large museum devoted to the era of "hot metal" printing, see rare photographs and other early Tombstone newspapers, and learn much about the life of John Philip Clum, the frontiersman who started The Epitaph after Tombstone burst on the western mining scene after silver was discovered by Ed Schieffelin in 1877.

== List of editors ==
- John Clum (1881–1882)
- Sam Purdy (1882)
- Charles Reppy (1882–1886)
- Harry Brooks (1886)
- John O. Dunbar (1886–1891)
- Stanley C. Bagg (1891–1895)
- William Hattich (1895–1913)
- Columbus Giragi (1913–1926)
- William B. Kelly (1926–1930)
- Walter Cole (1930–1938)
- Clayton A. Smith (1938–1964)
- Harold O. Love (1964)
- Wayne Winters (1964–1974)
- E. Dean Prichard (1974–2006)
- Wallace Clayton (1990–1998)
- Frederick A. Schoemehl (2007–2017)
- Mark Boardman (2017–present)

== Pop culture ==
The Epitaph and its editor (referred to as "Harris Claibourne") were prominently featured in many episodes of the television Western series Tombstone Territory, which aired from 1957 through 1960. The actual editor at that time, Clayton A. Smith, was credited for his "full cooperation" at the end of many episodes. Smith received $100 per episode for lending the paper's name to the series.

In addition, the rivalry between The Epitaph and The Nugget was featured in a 1959 episode of the TV Western series The Life and Legend of Wyatt Earp, which also devoted an episode to "Fighting Editor" John Clum the following year.

== See also ==
- Calico Print (magazine)
- Desert Rat Scrap Book
- Ten Percent Ring
