= Gunfight at the O.K. Corral =

1881 shootout in Tombstone, Arizona, United States

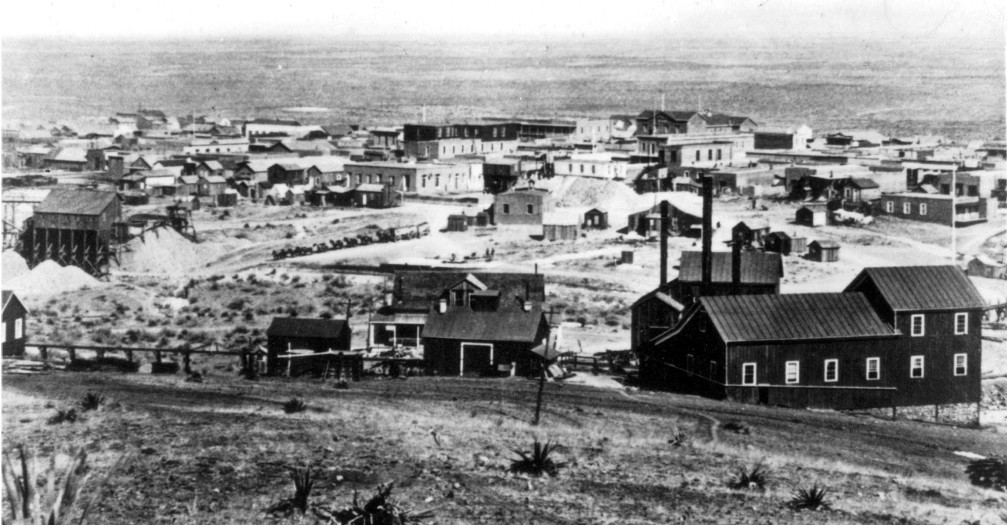
- Tombstone in 1881
Date	October 26, 1881
Location	Tombstone, Arizona Territory, U.S. 31°42′50″N 110°04′03″W

Participants
Wyatt Earp; Morgan Earp (WIA); Virgil Earp (WIA); Doc Holliday (WIA)	Ike Clanton; Billy Clanton †; Tom McLaury †; Frank McLaury †; Billy Claiborne

Casualties and losses
3 wounded	3 dead

The gunfight at the O.K. Corral pitted lawmen against members of a loosely organized group of cattle rustlers and horse thieves called the Cochise County Cowboys on October 26, 1881. While lasting less than a minute, the gunfight has been the subject of many books and films. Taking place in the town of Tombstone in Arizona Territory, the battle has become one archetype of the American Old West. The gunfight was the result of a long-simmering feud between five outlaws (including two sets of brothers) and four representatives of the law, including three brothers. The trigger for the event was the local marshal's decision to enforce a city ordinance that prohibited the carrying of weapons into town. To enforce that ordinance, the lawmen would have to disarm the Cowboys.

The lawmen were three brothers, Virgil, Wyatt, and Morgan Earp, and Wyatt’s close friend Doc Holliday. As Deputy U.S. Marshal and Town Marshal, Virgil was in charge, and it was his decision to enforce the ordinance that led to the gunfight. His two brothers and Doc Holliday had been appointed temporary assistant marshals. At the time of the gunfight, there were five members of the Cowboys in Tombstone: Billy Claiborne, brothers Ike and Billy Clanton, and brothers Tom and Frank McLaury. Despite its name, the gunfight did not take place within or next to the O.K. Corral, which fronted Allen Street and had a rear entrance lined with horse stalls on Fremont Street. The shootout actually took place in a narrow lot on the side of C. S. Fly's photography studio on Fremont Street, six doors west of the O.K. Corral's rear entrance. About thirty shots were fired in thirty seconds. During that brief battle, three men were killed, three were wounded, two ran away, and one fought but was unharmed. Ike Clanton subsequently filed murder charges against the Earps and Holliday. After a thirty-day preliminary hearing and a brief stint in jail, the defendants were shown to have acted lawfully.

The gunfight was not the end of the conflict. On December 28, 1881, Virgil was ambushed and maimed in a murder attempt by the Cowboys. On March 18, 1882, a Cowboy fired from a dark alley through the glass door of Campbell & Hatch's saloon and billiard parlor, killing Morgan. The suspects in both incidents furnished alibis supplied by other Cowboys and were not indicted. Wyatt, newly appointed as Deputy U.S. Marshal in Cochise County, then took matters into his own hands in a personal vendetta. He was pursued by county sheriff Johnny Behan, who had received a warrant from Tucson for Wyatt's killing of Frank Stilwell.

The gunfight was not widely known until two years after Wyatt Earp's death, when Stuart Lake published his 1931 book Wyatt Earp: Frontier Marshal. The book was the basis for the 1939 film Frontier Marshal, the 1946 film My Darling Clementine, and the 1957 film Gunfight at the O.K. Corral, after which the shootout became known by that name. The shootout was also depicted in the 1993 film Tombstone and the 1994 film Wyatt Earp. Since then, the conflict has been portrayed in numerous Western films and books, and has become an archetype for much of the popular imagery associated with the Old West.

== Background ==
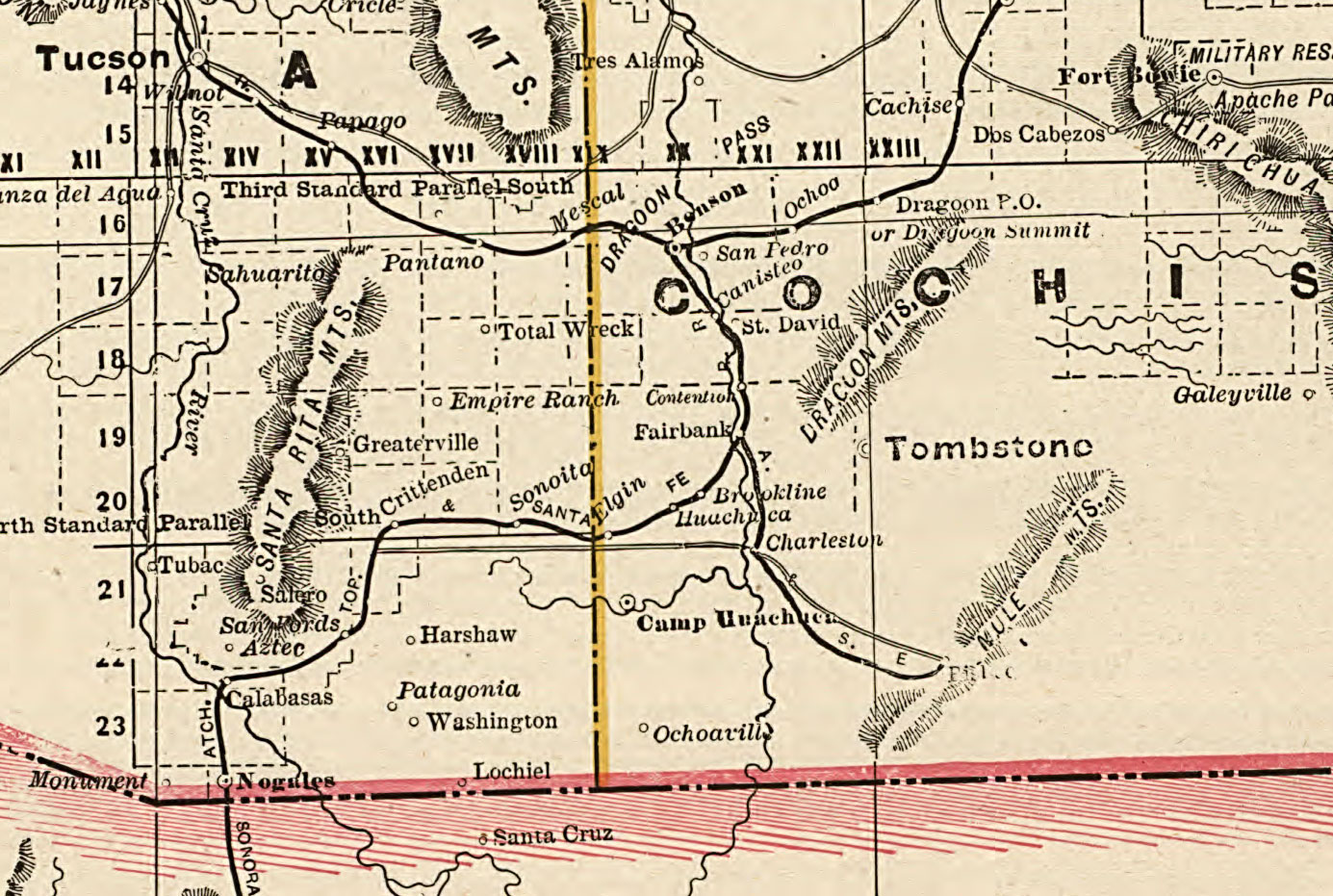
Southeastern Arizona near Tombstone in 1887.

Tombstone, located in Arizona Territory about 30 miles (50 km) from the Mexican border, was founded in March 1879 after silver was discovered in the area. Like many mining boomtowns on the American frontier, Tombstone grew rapidly. At its founding, it had a population of just 100, and only two years later, in late 1881, the population was more than 7,000 (excluding Chinese, Mexicans, women, and children), making it the largest boomtown in the American Southwest.

Silver mining and its attendant wealth attracted many professionals and merchants, who brought their wives and families. With them came churches and ministers. By 1881 the town boasted fancy restaurants, a bowling alley, four churches, an ice house, a school, an opera house, two banks, three newspapers, and an ice cream parlor, along with 110 saloons, fourteen gambling halls, and numerous brothels, all situated among a number of dirty, hardscrabble mines.

Horse rustlers and bandits from the countryside often came to town, and shootings were frequent. In the 1880s, the theft of cattle and the smuggling of alcohol and tobacco across the border were common. The Mexican government assessed heavy export taxes on these items, and smugglers earned a handsome profit by stealing them in Mexico and selling them in Tombstone.

James, Virgil, and Wyatt Earp arrived in Tombstone on December 1, 1879, when the town was mostly composed of tents as living quarters, a few saloons and other buildings, and the mines. Virgil had been hired as Deputy U.S. Marshal for eastern Pima County, with his offices in Tombstone, only days before his arrival. In June 1881 he was also appointed as Tombstone's town marshal (or police chief).

Though not universally liked by the townspeople, the Earp brothers tended to protect the interests of the town's business owners and residents; even so, Wyatt helped protect outlaw "Curly Bill" Brocius from being lynched after he accidentally killed Tombstone town marshal Fred White. In contrast, Cochise County Sheriff Johnny Behan was generally sympathetic to the interests of the rural ranchers and members of the loosely organized outlaw group called the Cochise County Cowboys, or simply the Cowboys, to which Brocius belonged. (In that time and region, the term cowboy generally meant an outlaw; legitimate cowmen were instead referred to as cattle herders or ranchers.)

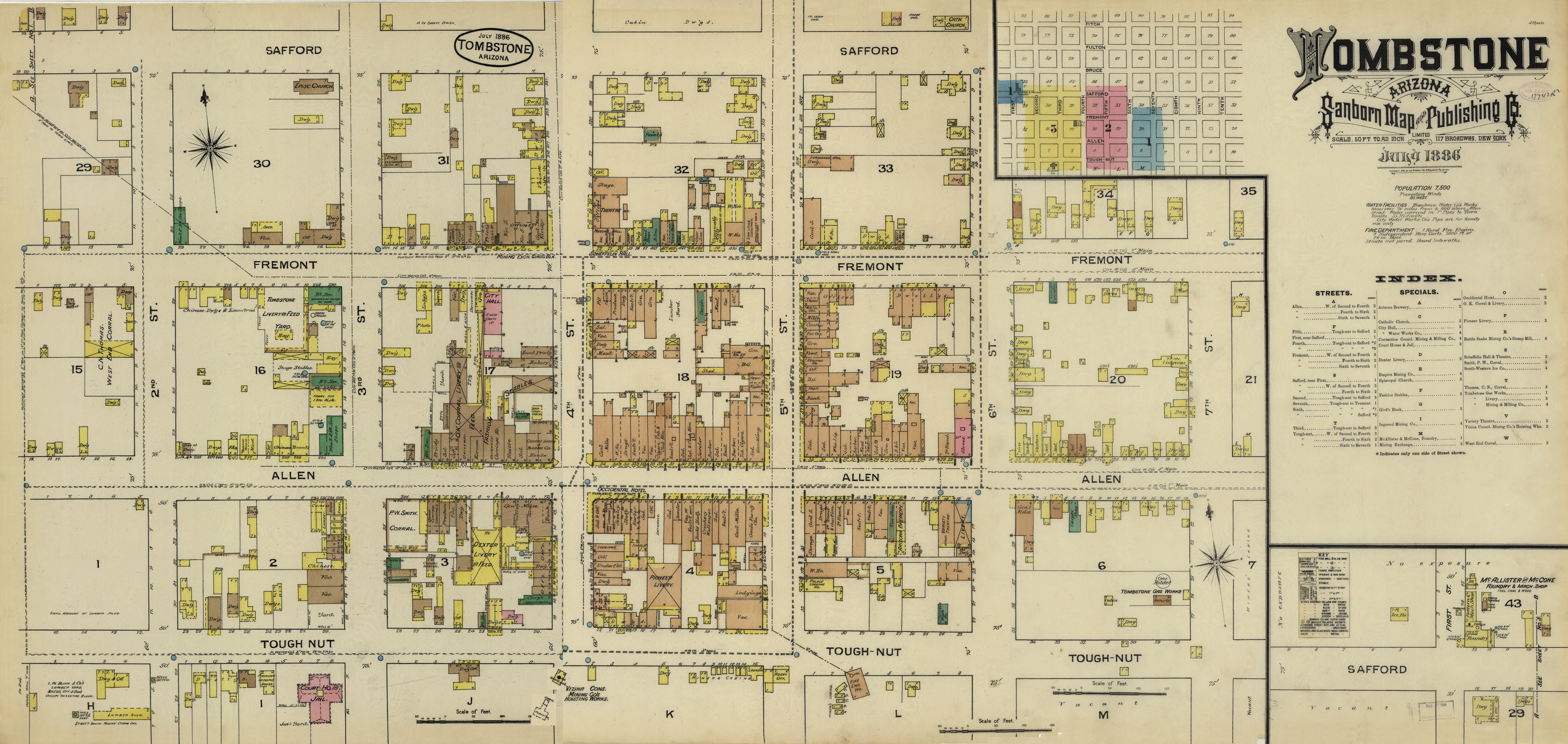
A fire insurance map of Tombstone in 1886. The OK Corral is bounded by 3rd and 4th Streets and Fremont and Allen Streets. A driveway exited on Fremont Street, where the gunfight took place.

== Conflicting versions of events ==
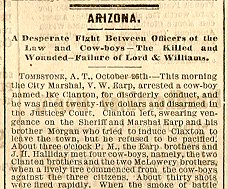
Newspaper coverage of the fight

Many of the sources describing the events leading up to the gunfight and details of the gunfight itself conflict with each other. Newspapers of the day were not above taking sides, and news reporting often editorialized on issues to reflect the publisher's interests. John Clum, publisher of The Tombstone Epitaph, had helped organize a "Committee of Safety" (a vigilance committee) in Tombstone in late September 1881. He was elected as Tombstone's first mayor under the new city charter that year.

Clum and his newspaper tended to side with the interests of local business owners and supported Deputy U.S. Marshal Virgil Earp. Harry Woods, the publisher of the other major newspaper, The Daily Nugget, was an undersheriff to Behan. He and his newspaper tended to side with Behan, the Cowboys (some of whom were part-time ranchers and landowners) and the rural interests of the ranchers.

Much of what is known of the event is based on month-long preliminary hearings held afterward, generally known as the Spicer hearings. Reporters from both newspapers covered the hearings and recorded the testimony there and at the coroner's inquest, but only the reporter from the Nugget knew shorthand. The testimony recorded by the court recorder and the two newspapers varied greatly.

According to the Earps' version of events, the fight was in self-defense because the Cowboys, armed in violation of local ordinance, defied a lawful order to hand over their weapons and drew their pistols instead. The Cowboys maintained that they raised their hands, offered no resistance, and were shot in cold blood by the Earps. Sorting out who was telling the truth was difficult then and remains so to this day.

Though usually opposing each other in their depiction of events, reporting by both the Epitaph and the Nugget initially supported the lawmen's version of events. Woods, the publisher of the pro-Cowboy Nugget, was out of town during the hearings, and an experienced reporter, Richard Rule, wrote the story. The Nugget staff had a close relationship with Behan, but Rule's story, as printed in the Nugget the day after the shootout, backed up the Earps' account. This varied widely from Behan's and the Cowboys' later court testimony.

Subsequent stories about the gunfight published in the Nugget after that day supported Behan's and the Cowboys' view of events. Other stories in the Epitaph countered the Nugget's later view entirely and supported the lawmen. Dr. George Goodfellow, who examined the Cowboys after their deaths, told the court that the angle of the wound in Billy Clanton's wrist indicated that his hands could not have been in the air, or holding his coats open by the lapels, as witnesses loyal to the Cowboys testified.

Part-time newspaper reporter Howell "Pat" Hayhurst transcribed the testimony from the hearings in the early 1930s as part of a Federal Writers' Project, which was part of the Works Progress Administration. According to one report, Hayhurst was a friend of the Behan family. After he completed his transcription, he kept the original document in his home, where it was destroyed in a house fire.

== Origins of the conflict ==
=== Earps versus Cowboys ===
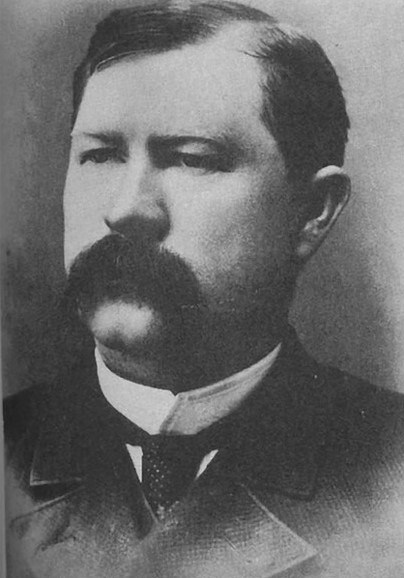
Virgil Earp, wounded during the gunfight, was later ambushed by the Cowboys

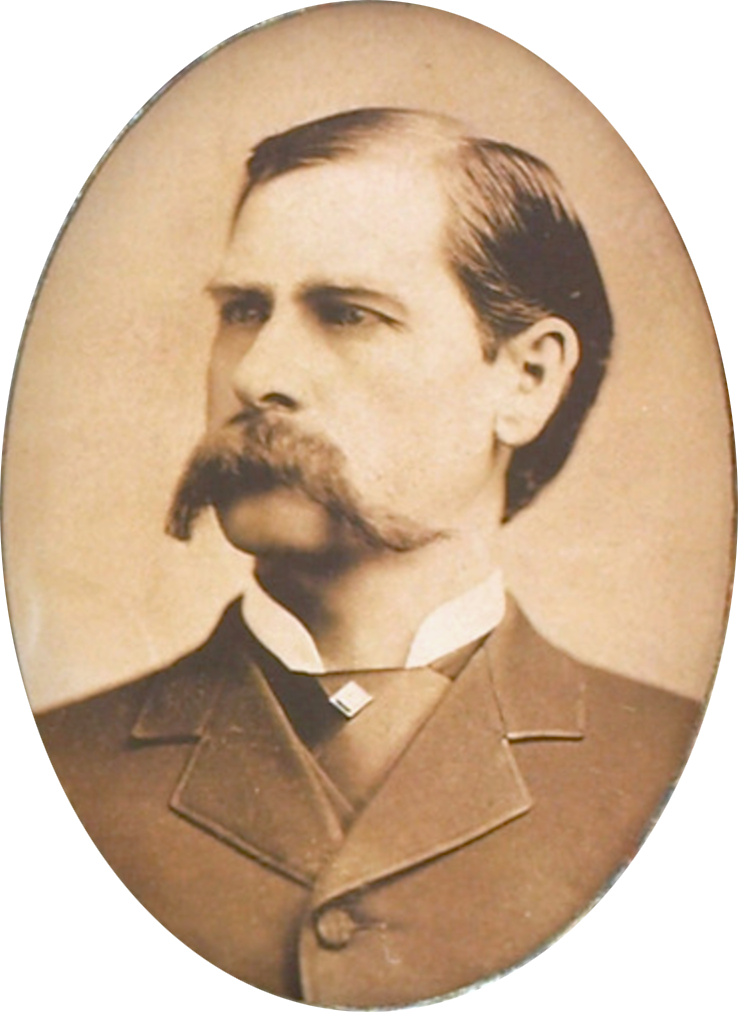
Wyatt Earp took matters into his own hands when the Cowboys who ambushed Virgil and murdered Morgan went free

The interpersonal conflicts and feuds leading to the gunfight were complex. Each side had strong family ties. The brothers James, Virgil, Wyatt, Morgan, and Warren Earp were a tight-knit family, working together as lawmen, pimps, and saloon owners in several frontier towns, among other occupations, and had moved together from one town to another. Virgil served in the Union Army during the American Civil War and in 1877 became a police officer in Prescott, Arizona Territory. He followed that with a job as a night watchman before he became a constable. Wyatt had held jobs as either a guard or police officer in the cattle-drive towns of Wichita and Dodge City, Kansas.

James, Virgil, and Wyatt Earp, together with their wives, arrived in Tombstone on December 1, 1879, during the early period of rapid growth associated with mining, when there were only a few hundred residents. Virgil was appointed Deputy U.S. Marshal shortly before he arrived in town. In the summer of 1880, Morgan and Warren Earp also moved to Tombstone. Wyatt arrived hoping he could leave "lawing" behind. He bought a stagecoach, only to find the business was already very competitive. The Earps invested together in several mining claims and water rights. The Earps were Republicans who had never worked as cowmen or ranchers.

The Earps quickly came into conflict with Frank and Tom McLaury, Billy and Ike Clanton, Johnny Ringo, and William "Curly Bill" Brocius, among others. They were part of a large, loose association of cattle smugglers and horse thieves known as the Cowboys, outlaws who had been implicated in various crimes. Ike Clanton was prone to drinking heavily and threatened the Earp brothers numerous times.

Tombstone resident George Parson wrote in his diary, "A Cowboy is a rustler at times, and a rustler is a synonym for desperado—bandit, outlaw, and horse thief." The San Francisco Examiner wrote in an editorial, "Cowboys [are] the most reckless class of outlaws in that wild country ... infinitely worse than the ordinary robber." During the 1880s in Cochise County, it was an insult to call a legitimate cattleman a "Cowboy". The Cowboys teamed up for various crimes and came to each other's aid. Virgil thought that some of the Cowboys had met at Charleston and taken "an oath over blood drawn from the arm of Johnny Ringo, the leader, that they would kill us."

=== The Earps as lawmen ===
Among the lawmen involved in the O.K. Corral shooting, only Virgil had any real experience in combat. Virgil had been constable in Prescott and was the deputy United States Marshal in Tombstone. He was appointed Deputy U.S. Marshal for eastern Pima County by U.S. Marshal Crawley Dake, on November 27, 1879, before the Earps arrived in Tombstone on December 1. He was appointed as Tombstone's acting town marshal on September 30, 1880, after popular Tombstone town marshal Fred White was accidentally shot and killed by Brocius. Wyatt had been a deputy city marshal in Kansas, as well as deputy sheriff in Tombstone.

Only six weeks later, Virgil ran for the office on November 12, 1880, but lost to Ben Sippy. However, on June 6, 1881, Sippy asked for a two-week leave of absence. The city soon discovered $3,000 (equivalent to $100,000 in 2025) in financial improprieties in Sippy's records. A few days later Virgil was appointed as town marshal in his place. At the time of the gunfight, Virgil was both Deputy U.S. Marshal and town marshal. The city suspended him as town marshal after Ike Clanton filed murder charges.

After Wyatt first arrived in Tombstone, his business efforts yielded little profit, and he took a job as a stagecoach shotgun messenger for Wells Fargo, guarding shipments of silver bullion. On July 28, 1880, Wyatt was appointed Pima County Deputy Sheriff. He held this position for only three months, until after the election of November 9, 1880, when he resigned. When Virgil was maimed by an assassination attempt, Wyatt was appointed Deputy U.S. Marshal in his place. He held that position until he left Cochise County in April 1882.

Wyatt was an imposing, handsome man: blond, 6 feet (1.8 m) tall, weighing 165 to 170 pounds (75 to 77 kg), broad-shouldered, long-armed, and muscular. He had been a boxer and was reputed to be an expert with a pistol. According to author Leo Silva, Earp showed no fear of any man.

Wyatt had been an assistant marshal when he and policeman James Masterson, along with a few other citizens, fired their pistols at several cowboys who were fleeing town after shooting up a theater. A member of the group, George Hoyt (sometimes spelled Hoy), was shot in the arm and died of his wound a month later. Wyatt always claimed to have been the one to shoot Hoyt, although it could have been anyone among the lawmen. Wyatt had developed a reputation as a no-nonsense, hard-nosed lawman, but prior to the gunfight he had been involved in only one other shooting, in Dodge City, Kansas, during the summer of 1878.

The 1931 book Wyatt Earp: Frontier Marshal was a best-selling biography by Stuart N. Lake. It established Wyatt Earp's role as a fearless lawman in the American Old West and the legend of the "Gunfight at the O.K. Corral" in the public consciousness. But Lake and many others in the popular media wildly exaggerated Wyatt's role as the central figure in the gunfight. It was only discovered much later that Wyatt Earp: Frontier Marshal, based on eight interviews with Earp, was largely fictional. The book and later Hollywood portrayals embellished Wyatt's reputation and magnified his mystique as a western lawman.

Morgan Earp had been a police officer in Montana, but had no known experience with gunfighting prior to their arrival in Tombstone. While Wyatt was Pima County Deputy Sheriff on July 27, 1880, Morgan Earp took over his job as shotgun messenger for Wells Fargo. Morgan also occasionally assisted Virgil and at the time of the gunfight was a special deputy policeman and drawing pay.

Doc Holliday had a reputation as a gunman and had reportedly been in nine shootouts during his life, although it has only been verified that he killed three men. One well-documented episode occurred on July 19, 1879, when Holliday and his business partner, former deputy marshal John Joshua Webb, were seated in their saloon in Las Vegas, New Mexico. Former U.S. Army scout Mike Gordon got into a loud argument with one of the saloon girls whom he wanted to take with him. Gordon stormed from the saloon and began firing his revolver into the building. Before Gordon could get off his second shot, Holliday killed him. Holliday was tried for murder but acquitted, mostly based on the testimony of Webb.

Holliday had saved Wyatt Earp's life at one time and had become a close friend. He had been living in Prescott, Arizona Territory and making a living as a gambler since late 1879. There, he first met future Tombstone sheriff Johnny Behan, a sometime gambler and saloon owner. In late September 1880, Holliday followed the Earps to Tombstone.

=== Rural Cowboys vs. Tombstone interests ===
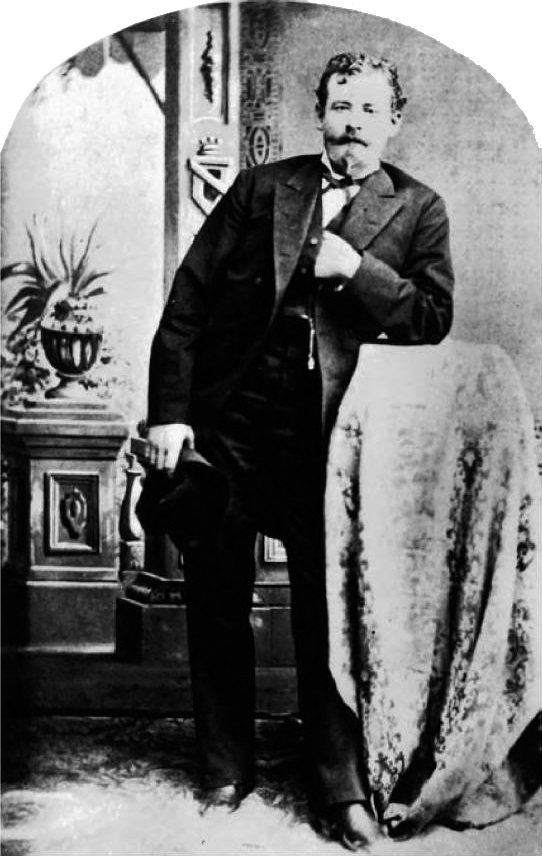
Ike Clanton swore multiple times he would kill the Earps but ran from the gunfight

The ranch owned by Newman Haynes Clanton near Charleston, Arizona was believed to be the local center for the Cowboys' illegal activities. Tom and Frank McLaury worked with the rustlers buying and selling stolen cattle.

Many of the rural ranchers and Cowboys resented the growing influence of the city residents over county politics and law enforcement. The ranchers largely maintained control of the country outside Tombstone, due in large part to the sympathetic support of Cochise County Sheriff Johnny Behan, who favored the Cowboys and rural ranchers, and who also grew to intensely dislike the Earps. Behan tended to ignore the Earps' complaints about the McLaurys' and Clantons' horse thieving and cattle rustling. The Earps were known to bend the law in their favor when it affected their gambling and saloon interests, which earned them further enmity with the Cowboy faction.

=== Relevant law in Tombstone ===
To reduce crime in Tombstone, on April 19, 1881, the city council passed ordinance 9, requiring anyone carrying a bowie knife, dirk, pistol or rifle to deposit their weapons at a livery or saloon soon after entering town.

To Provide against Carrying of Deadly Weapons

Section 1. It is hereby declared unlawful to carry in the hand or upon the person or otherwise any deadly weapon within the limits of said city of Tombstone, without first obtaining a permit in writing.

Section 2: This prohibition does not extend to persons immediately leaving or entering the city, who, with good faith, and within reasonable time are proceeding to deposit, or take from the place of deposit such deadly weapon.

Section 3: All fire-arms of every description, and bowie knives and dirks, are included within the prohibition of this ordinance.

— Tombstone City Ordinance Number 9 Effective April 19, 1881,

The ordinance was the legal basis for City Marshal Virgil Earp's decision to confront the Cowboys on the day of the shootout.

=== Smuggling and stock thefts ===
In the borderlands south of Tombstone there was only one passable route between Arizona and Mexico, a passage known as Guadalupe Canyon. In August 1881, 15 Mexicans carrying gold, coins and bullion to make their purchases were ambushed and killed in Skeleton Canyon. The next month, Mexican Commandant Felipe Neri dispatched troops to the border, where they killed five Cowboys, including Newman Haynes "Old Man" Clanton, in Guadalupe Canyon.

The Earps knew that the McLaurys and Clantons were reputed to be mixed up in the robbery and murder in Skeleton Canyon. Wyatt Earp said in his testimony after the shootout, "I naturally kept my eyes open and did not intend that any of the gang should get the drop on me if I could help it."

=== Earp loses sheriff's office to Behan ===
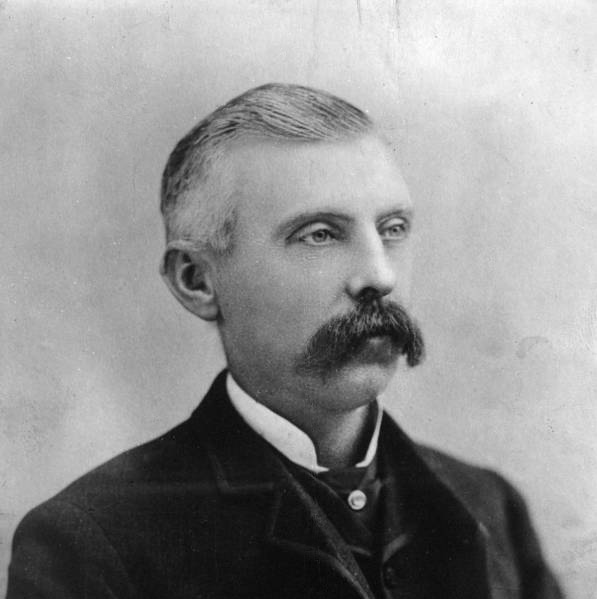
Pima County Sheriff Charles A. Shibell appointed Wyatt Earp as deputy sheriff over eastern Pima County.

On July 27, 1880, Pima County Sheriff Charles A. Shibell, whose offices were in the county seat of Tucson, appointed Wyatt Earp as deputy sheriff. On October 28, 1880, Tombstone Marshal Fred White attempted to disarm some late-night revelers who were shooting their pistols in the air. When he attempted to disarm Curly Bill Brocius, the gun discharged, striking White in the abdomen. Wyatt saw the shooting and pistol-whipped Brocius, knocking him unconscious, and arrested him. Wyatt later told his biographer John Flood that he thought Brocius was still armed at the time, and did not see Brocius' pistol on the ground.

Brocius waived the preliminary hearing so he and his case could be immediately transferred to Tucson. Wyatt and a deputy took Brocius in a wagon the next day to Tucson to stand trial, possibly saving him from being lynched. Wyatt testified that he thought the shooting was accidental. It was also demonstrated that Brocius's pistol could be fired from half-cock. Fred White left a statement before he died two days later that the shooting was not intentional. Based on the evidence presented, Brocius was not charged with White's death.

The Tombstone council convened and appointed Virgil Earp as "temporary assistant city marshal" to replace White for a salary of $100 per month (equivalent to $3,300 in 2025) until an election could be held on November 12. For the next few weeks, Virgil represented federal and local law enforcement and Wyatt represented Pima County.

In the November 2, 1880, election for Pima County sheriff, Democrat Shibell ran against Republican Bob Paul, who was expected to win. Votes arrived as late as November 7, and Shibell was unexpectedly re-elected. He immediately appointed Johnny Behan as the new deputy sheriff for eastern Pima County, a job that Wyatt wanted. A controversy ensued when Paul uncovered ballot-stuffing by Cowboys and he sued to overturn the election. While San Simeon precinct, east of Tombstone, only had 10 registered voters, Shibell won that precinct with 103 votes to 1. Ike Clanton was the election inspector and Johnny Ringo was one of the election judges.

Paul finally became sheriff in April 1881, but it was too late to re-appoint Wyatt Earp as deputy sheriff because on February 1, 1881, the eastern portion of Pima County containing Tombstone had been split off into the new Cochise County, which would need its own sheriff, based in the county's largest city, Tombstone. This position was filled by a political appointment from the governor, and Wyatt and Behan both wanted the job. The Cochise County sheriff's position was worth more than $40,000 a year (equivalent to $1.3 million in 2025) because the office holder was also county assessor and tax collector, and the board of supervisors allowed him to keep ten percent of the amounts paid.

Behan used his existing position and his superior political connections to successfully lobby for the position. He also promised Wyatt a position as his undersheriff if he was appointed over Wyatt. Wyatt withdrew from the political contest and the governor and legislature appointed Behan to the job of Cochise County sheriff on February 10, 1881. Behan reneged on his deal with Earp and appointed Harry Woods as undersheriff instead. Behan said he broke his promise to appoint Earp because Wyatt Earp used Behan's name to threaten Ike Clanton when Wyatt recovered his stolen horse from Clanton.

== Earp conflicts with Cowboys ==
Tensions between the Earp family and both the Clanton and McLaury clans increased through 1881. On July 25, 1880, Captain Joseph H. Hurst, of Company A, 12th U.S. Infantry, and Commanding Officer of Fort Bennett, asked Deputy U.S. Marshal Virgil Earp to help him track Cowboys who had stolen six U.S. Army mules from Camp Rucker. This was a federal matter because the animals were U.S. property. Hurst brought four soldiers, and Virgil invited Wyatt and Morgan Earp, as well as Wells Fargo agent Marshall Williams. The posse found the mules on the McLaury's Ranch on Babacomari Creek, northwest of Tombstone, as well as the branding iron used to change the "US" brand to "D8."

To avoid bloodshed, Cowboy Frank Patterson promised Hurst they would return the mules and Hurst persuaded the posse to withdraw. Hurst went to nearby Charleston, but the Cowboys showed up two days later without the mules, laughing at Hurst and the Earps. In response, Hurst had printed and distributed a handbill in which he named Frank McLaury as specifically assisting with hiding the mules. He re-printed this in The Tombstone Epitaph on July 30, 1880. Virgil later said that McLaury had asked him if he had posted the handbills. When Virgil said he had not, McLaury said if Virgil had printed the handbills it was Frank's intention to kill Virgil. He warned Virgil, "If you ever again follow us as close as you did, then you will have to fight anyway." This incident was the first run-in between the Clantons and McLaurys and the Earps.

=== March stagecoach robbery and murder ===
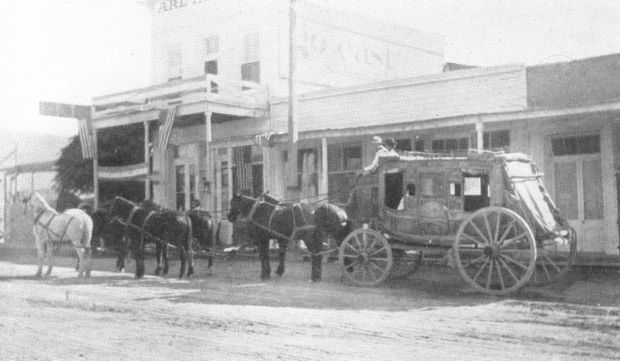
A Kinnear Express stagecoach operating from Tombstone to Bisbee in the 1880s. This thorough-brace stagecoach used thick leather straps to support the body of the carriage and serve as shock-absorbing springs.

On the evening of March 15, 1881, a Kinnear & Company stagecoach carrying $26,000 in silver bullion (equivalent to $870,000 in 2025) was en route from Tombstone to Benson, Arizona, the nearest freight terminal. Bob Paul, who had run for Pima County Sheriff and was contesting the election he lost due to ballot-stuffing, was temporarily working once again as the Wells Fargo shotgun messenger. He had taken the reins and driver's seat in Contention City because the usual driver, a well-known and popular man named Eli "Bud" Philpot, was ill. Philpot was riding shotgun.

Near Drew's Station, just outside Contention City, a man stepped into the road and commanded them to "Hold!" Three Cowboys attempted to rob the stage. Paul, in the driver's seat, fired his shotgun and emptied his revolver at the robbers, wounding a Cowboy later identified as Bill Leonard in the groin. Philpot, riding shotgun, and passenger Peter Roerig, riding in the rear dickey seat, were both shot and killed. The horses spooked and Paul was not able to bring the stage under control for almost one mile (1.6 km), leaving the robbers with nothing. Paul, who normally rode shotgun, later said he thought the first shot killing Philpot had been meant for him.

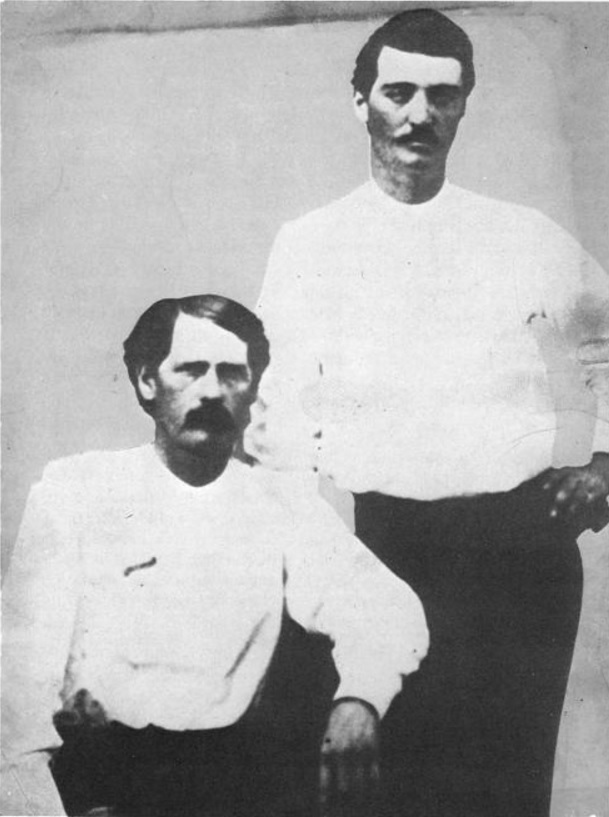
Wyatt Earp and Bat Masterson (standing) in 1876 as lawmen in Dodge City, Kansas

Deputy U.S. Marshal Virgil Earp, along with temporary federal deputies Wyatt and Morgan Earp, Wells Fargo agent Marshall Williams, former Kansas Sheriff Bat Masterson (who was dealing faro at the Oriental Saloon), and County Sheriff Behan set out to find the robbers. Wells Fargo issued a wanted poster offering a $3,600 reward (equivalent to $120,000 in 2025) for the three robbers ($1,200 each), dead or alive. Robbery of a mail-carrying stagecoach was both a federal crime and territorial crime, and the posse consisted of both county and federal authorities and deputies.

The posse trailed the robbers to a nearby ranch where they found a drifter named Luther King. He would not tell who his confederates were until the posse lied and told him that Doc Holliday's girlfriend had been shot. Fearful of Holliday's reputation, he confessed to holding the reins of the robbers' horses, and identified Bill Leonard, Harry "The Kid" Head, and Jim Crane as the robbers. They were all known Cowboys and rustlers. Behan and Williams escorted King back to Tombstone.

Remarkably, King walked in the front door of the jail and a few minutes later walked out the back. King had arranged with Undersheriff Harry Woods (publisher of the Nugget) to sell the horse he had been riding to John Dunbar, Sheriff Behan's partner in the Dexter Livery Stable. On March 19, King conveniently escaped while Dunbar and Woods were making out the bill-of-sale. Woods claimed that someone had deliberately unlocked a secured back door to the jail. The Earps and the townspeople were furious at King's easy escape. Williams was later dismissed from Wells Fargo, leaving behind a number of debts, when it was determined he had been stealing from the company for years.

The Earps pursued the other two men for 17 days, riding for 60 hours without food and 36 hours without water, during which Bob Paul's horse died, and Wyatt and Morgan's horses became so weak that the two men walked 18 miles (29 km) back to Tombstone to obtain new horses. After pursuing the Cowboys for over 400 miles (640 km) they could not obtain more fresh horses and were forced to give up the chase. They returned to Tombstone on April 1.

Behan submitted a bill for $796.84, equivalent to $27,000 in 2025, to the county for posse expenses, but he refused to reimburse the Earps for any of their costs. Virgil was incensed. They were later reimbursed by Wells, Fargo & Co., but the incident caused further friction between county and federal law enforcement, and between Behan and the Earps.

After he was passed over by Johnny Behan for the position of undersheriff, Wyatt thought he might beat him in the next Cochise County election in late 1882. He thought catching the murderers of Bud Philpot and Peter Roerig would help him win the sheriff's office. Wyatt later said that on June 2, 1881, he offered the Wells, Fargo & Co. reward money and more to Ike Clanton if he would provide information leading to the capture or death of the stage robbers. According to Wyatt, Ike was initially interested, but the plan was foiled when the three suspects — Leonard, Head and Crane — were killed in unrelated incidents.

Ike began to fear that word of his possible cooperation had leaked, threatening to compromise his standing among the Cowboys. Undercover Wells Fargo Company agent M. Williams suspected a deal, and said something to Ike, who was fearful that other Cowboys might learn of his double-cross. Ike now began to threaten Wyatt and Doc Holliday (who had learned of the deal) for apparently revealing Ike's willingness to help arrest his friends.

The fallout over the Cowboys' attempt to implicate Holliday and the Earps in the robbery, along with Behan's involvement in King's escape, was the beginning of increasingly bad feelings between the Earp brothers and Cowboy factions.

=== Earp and Behan attracted to Josephine Marcus ===
Wyatt Earp and Cochise County sheriff Johnny Behan were interested in the same sheriff's position and also might have shared an interest in the same woman, Josephine Marcus, known as Sadie. Citizens of Tombstone believed that Behan and Sadie were married, but Behan was a known womanizer and had relations with prostitutes and other women. In early 1881, Sadie ended the relationship after she came home and found Behan in bed with the wife of a friend and kicked him out, although she used the Behan surname through the end of that summer. She rented her home sometime before April 1881 to Dr. George Goodfellow.

Wyatt Earp lived with Mattie Blaylock, who was listed as his wife in the 1880 census. She had a growing addiction to the opiate laudanum, which was readily available at the time. Earp remained with Blaylock until he left Tombstone in April 1882. There are no contemporary Tombstone records that indicate a relationship between Sadie and Earp, but Earp certainly knew her, because both Behan and Earp had offices above the Crystal Palace Saloon.

Sadie, traveling as either Mrs. J. C. Earp or Mrs. Wyatt Earp, left for Los Angeles on March 25, 1882, and then returned to her family in San Francisco. In July 1882, Wyatt left Colorado and went to San Francisco, where he sought out Sadie and his brother Virgil, who was seeking treatment for his arm. In February or March 1883, Sadie and Earp left San Francisco for Gunnison, where Earp ran a Faro bank until he received a request in April for assistance from Luke Short in Dodge City. Sadie was his common-law wife for the next 46 years.

=== September stage holdup ===
Tensions between the Earps and the McLaurys further increased when another passenger stage on the 'Sandy Bob Line' in the Tombstone area, bound for Bisbee, was held up on September 8, 1881. The masked bandits robbed all of the passengers of their valuables since the stage was not carrying a strongbox. During the robbery, the driver heard one of the robbers describe the money as "sugar", a phrase known to be used by Frank Stilwell. Stilwell had, until the prior month, been a deputy for Sheriff Behan but had been fired for "accounting irregularities".

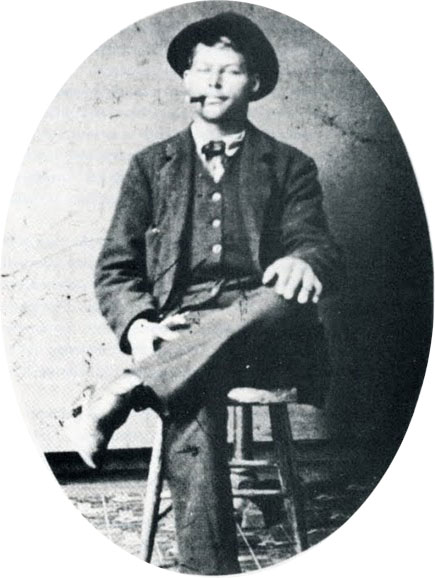
Frank Stilwell, suspected of killing Morgan, murdered by the Earps

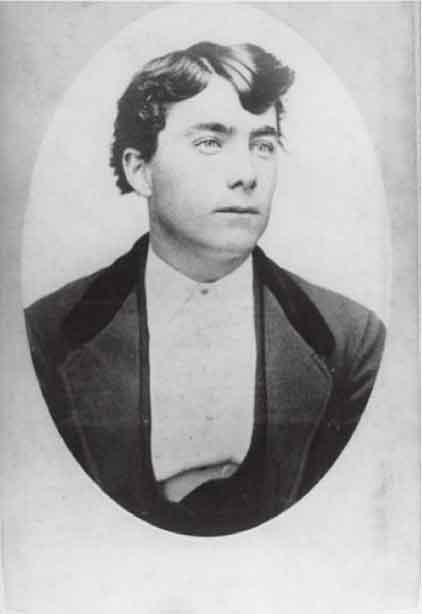
Tom McLaury, killed in the gunfight

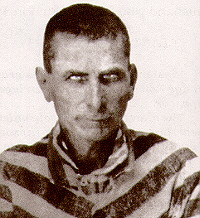
Pete Spence, suspected of ambushing Virgil

Wyatt and Virgil Earp rode with a sheriff's posse and tracked the Bisbee stage robbers. Virgil had been appointed Tombstone's town marshal (i.e., chief of police) on June 6, 1881, after Ben Sippy abandoned the job. Virgil at the same time continued to hold his position of deputy U.S. marshal, and it was in this federal capacity that he continued to chase robbers of stage coaches outside Tombstone city limits. At the scene of the holdup, Wyatt discovered an unusual boot print left by someone wearing a custom-repaired boot heel. The Earps checked a shoe repair shop in Bisbee known to provide widened boot heels and were able to link the boot print to Stilwell.

==== Stilwell and Spence arrests ====
Frank Stilwell had just arrived in Bisbee with his livery stable partner, Pete Spence, when the two were arrested by Deputy U.S. Marshal Virgil Earp for the holdup. Both were friends of Ike Clanton and the McLaurys. At the preliminary hearing, Stilwell and Spence were able to provide several witnesses who supported their alibis. Judge Spicer dropped the charges for insufficient evidence just as he had done for Doc Holliday earlier in the year.

Released on bail, Spence and Stilwell were re-arrested October 13 by Marshal Virgil Earp for the Bisbee robbery on a new federal charge of interfering with a mail carrier. The newspapers, however, reported that they had been arrested for a different stage robbery that occurred on October 8 near Contention City.

Ike and other Cowboys believed the new arrest was further evidence that the Earps were illegally persecuting the Cowboys. They told the Earps that they could expect retaliation. While Virgil and Wyatt were in Tucson for the federal hearing on the charges against Spence and Stilwell, Frank McLaury confronted Morgan Earp. He told him that the McLaurys would kill the Earps if they tried to arrest Spence, Stilwell, or the McLaurys again. The Tombstone Epitaph reported "that since the arrest of Spence and Stilwell, veiled threats [are] being made that the friends of the accused will 'get the Earps.'"

==== Cowboys accuse Holliday of robbery ====
Milt Joyce, a county supervisor and owner of the Oriental Saloon, had a contentious relationship with Doc Holliday. In October 1880, Holliday had trouble with a gambler named Johnny Tyler in Milt Joyce's Oriental Saloon. Tyler had been hired by a competing gambling establishment to drive customers from Joyce's saloon. Holliday challenged Tyler to a fight, but Tyler ran. Joyce did not like Holliday or the Earps and he continued to argue with Holliday.

Joyce ordered Holliday removed from the saloon but would not return Holliday's revolver. But Holliday returned carrying a double-action revolver. Milt brandished a pistol and threatened Holliday, but Holliday shot Joyce in the palm, disarming him, and then shot Joyce's business partner William Parker in the big toe. Joyce then hit Holliday over the head with his revolver. Holliday was arrested and pleaded guilty to assault and battery.

Holliday and his on-again, off-again mistress Big Nose Kate had many fights. After a particularly nasty, drunken argument, Holliday kicked her out. County Sheriff John Behan and Milt Joyce saw an opportunity and exploited the situation. They plied Big Nose Kate with more booze and suggested to her a way to get even with Holliday. She signed an affidavit implicating Holliday in the attempted stagecoach robbery and murders. Holliday was a good friend of Bill Leonard, a former watchmaker from New York, one of three men implicated in the robbery.

Judge Wells Spicer issued an arrest warrant for Holliday. The Earps found witnesses who could attest to Holliday's location at the time of the murders and Kate sobered up, revealing that Behan and Joyce had influenced her to sign a document she did not understand. With the Cowboy plot revealed, Spicer freed Holliday. The district attorney threw out the charges, labeling them "ridiculous." Doc gave Kate some money and put her on a stage out of town.

=== Ike Clanton's conflict with Doc Holliday ===
Wyatt Earp testified after the gunfight that five or six weeks prior he had met Ike Clanton outside the Alhambra Hotel. Ike told Wyatt that Doc Holliday had told him he knew of Ike's meetings with Wyatt and about Ike providing information on Head, Leonard, and Crane, as well as their attempted robbery of the stage. Ike now accused Earp of telling Holliday about these conversations. Earp testified that he told Ike he had not told Holliday anything. Wyatt Earp offered to prove this when Holliday and the Clantons next returned to town.

A month later, the weekend before the shootout, Morgan Earp was concerned about possible trouble with the Cowboys. He asked Doc Holliday to come back to Tombstone from a fiesta celebration in Tucson where Holliday had been gambling. Upon his return, Wyatt Earp asked Holliday about Ike's accusation.

On the morning of Tuesday, October 25, 1881, the day before the gunfight, Ike Clanton and Tom McLaury drove 10 miles (16 km) in a spring wagon from Chandler's Milk Ranch at the foot of the Dragoon Mountains to Tombstone. They were in town to sell a large number of beef stock, most of them owned by the McLaurys. Fred Dodge, an undercover detective for Wells Fargo, heard from J.B. Ayers, another undercover Wells Fargo man in Contention, that Frank McLaury, Billy Clanton, and Billy Claiborne were in town and planning to join Ike and Tom in Tombstone Wednesday afternoon. Dodge, who had been sick, got up and went looking for city marshal Virgil Earp. He found Tombstone Deputy City Marshal Morgan Earp at the Alhambra Saloon instead and told him the news.

Near midnight, Holliday saw Clanton in the Alhambra Saloon and confronted him, accusing him of lying about their previous conversations. They got into a heated argument. Wyatt Earp, who was not wearing a badge, encouraged his brother Morgan to intervene. Morgan took Holliday out onto the street and Ike, who had been drinking steadily, followed them. City Marshal Virgil Earp arrived a few minutes later and threatened to arrest both Holliday and Clanton if they did not stop quarreling.

Wyatt Earp walked over to the Oriental Saloon and Ike followed him. They talked again, and Ike threatened to confront Holliday in the morning. Ike told Earp that the fighting talk had been going on for a long time and that he intended to put an end to it. Ike told Earp, "I will be ready for you in the morning." Wyatt told Ike to go home "because there was no money in it." Ike sat down near Wyatt, his revolver in plain sight, and told Earp "You must not think I won't be after you all in the morning." Virgil Earp went to the Occidental Saloon across the street.

== Morning of the gunfight ==
=== Events leading up to the Ike Clanton court hearing ===
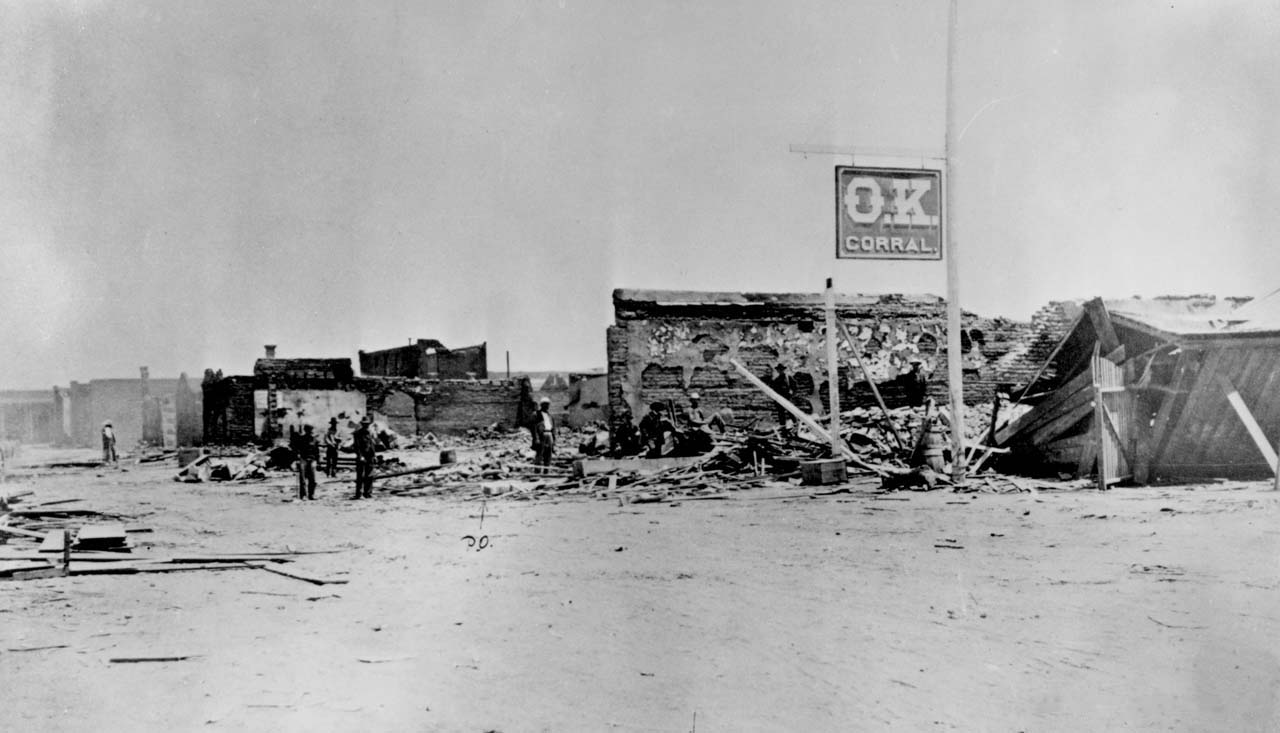
The O.K. Corral after a fire in 1882

After Holliday's confrontation with Ike Clanton, Wyatt Earp took Holliday back to his room at Camillus Sidney "Buck" Fly's Lodging House to sleep off his drinking, then went home and to bed. Tombstone Marshal Virgil Earp played poker with Ike Clanton, Tom McLaury, Cochise County Sheriff Johnny Behan and a fifth unnamed man in a back room of the Occidental Saloon until morning.

At about dawn on October 26, the card game broke up and Behan and Virgil Earp went home to bed. Ike Clanton testified later he saw Virgil take his six-shooter out of his lap and stick it in his pants when the game ended. Not having rented a room, Tom McLaury and Ike Clanton had no place to go. Shortly after 8:00 am barkeeper E. F. Boyle spoke to Ike Clanton in front of the telegraph office. Clanton had been drinking all night and Boyle encouraged him to get some sleep, but Ike insisted he would not go to bed. Boyle later testified he noticed Ike was armed and covered his gun for him.

Boyle later said that Ike told him, "'As soon as the Earps and Doc Holliday showed themselves on the street, the ball would open — that they would have to fight' ... I went down to Wyatt Earp's house and told him that Ike Clanton had threatened that when Wyatt, his brothers, and Doc Holliday showed themselves on the street that the ball would open." Ike said in his testimony afterward that he remembered neither meeting Boyle nor making any such statements that day. Deputy Marshal Andy Bronk also heard the talk around town. He woke Virgil, who listened, and went back to sleep. Ike's continuous threats were not worth losing sleep over.

Later in the morning, Ike picked up his rifle and revolver from the West End Corral, where he had deposited his weapons and stabled his wagon and team after entering town. By noon that day, Ike was still drinking and once again armed, in violation of the city ordinance against carrying firearms in the city. He told anyone who would listen he was looking for Holliday or an Earp. At Fly's boarding house where Holliday and his common-law wife Mary Katharine Horony were sleeping, proprietor Mary Fly heard Clanton's threats and banged on Holliday's door. Fly told Horony, "Ike Clanton was here looking for [Holliday], and he had a rifle with him." Horony woke Holliday and relayed the threat, who replied, "If God will let me live to get my clothes on, he will see me."

At about 1:00 p.m., Marshal Virgil and his Deputy Morgan Earp found Ike on Fourth Street, still armed, and Virgil pistol whipped him from behind. Disarming him, the Earps took Ike to appear before Justice of the Peace A.O. Wallace for violating the ordinance. Wyatt waited with Ike while Virgil went to find Justice Wallace so a court hearing could be held.

=== Ike Clanton court hearing ===
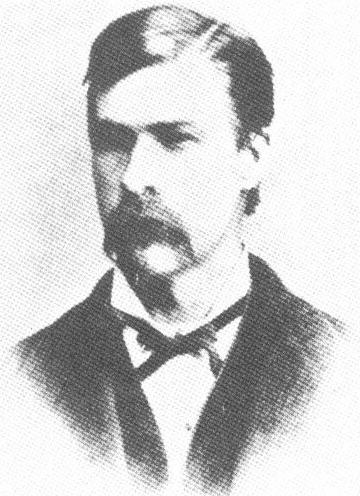
Morgan Earp, later murdered by the Cowboys

While Wyatt waited for Virgil to return with Justice Wallace, witnesses overheard Wyatt tell Ike, "You cattle thieving son-of-a-bitch, and you know that I know you are a cattle thieving son-of-a-bitch, you've threatened my life enough, and you've got to fight!", Ike Clanton was heard to reply, "Fight is my racket, and all I want is four feet of ground!"

Ike reported in his testimony afterward that Wyatt Earp cursed him. He said Wyatt, Virgil and Morgan offered him his rifle and to fight him right there in the courthouse, which Ike declined. Ike also denied ever threatening the Earps. Justice Wallace fined Ike $25 (equivalent to $830 in 2025) plus court costs. Ike paid the fine and Virgil told Ike he could pick up his confiscated rifle and revolver at the Grand Hotel, which was favored by Cowboys when in town. Ike testified that he picked up the weapons from William Soule, the jailer, a couple of days later.

=== Tom McLaury's concealed weapon ===
Outside the court house where Ike was being fined, Tombstone Deputy Marshal Wyatt almost walked into 28-year-old Tom McLaury as the two men were brought up short nose-to-nose. Tom, who had arrived in town the day before, was required by the well-known city ordinance to deposit his pistol when he first arrived in town. When Wyatt demanded, "Are you heeled or not?", McLaury said he was not armed. Wyatt testified that he saw a revolver in plain sight on the right hip of Tom's pants.

As an unpaid deputy marshal for Virgil, Wyatt habitually carried a pistol, in his waistband or in a coat pocket lined with leather to make drawing it easier. Witnesses reported that Wyatt drew his revolver from his coat pocket and pistol whipped Tom McLaury with it twice, leaving him prostrate and bleeding on the street. Saloon-keeper Andrew Mehan testified at the Spicer hearing afterward that he saw McLaury deposit a revolver at the Capital Saloon sometime between 1:00–2:00 p.m., after the confrontation with Wyatt, which Mehan also witnessed.

Wyatt said in his deposition afterward that he had been temporarily acting as city marshal for Virgil the week before while Virgil was in Tucson for the Pete Spence and Frank Stilwell trial. Wyatt said that he still considered himself a deputy city marshal, which Virgil later confirmed. Since Wyatt was an off-duty officer, he could not legally search or arrest Tom for carrying a revolver within the city limits — a misdemeanor offense. Only Virgil or one of his city police deputies, including Morgan Earp and possibly Warren Earp, could search him and take any required action. Wyatt, who was portrayed as a non-drinker, testified at the Spicer hearing that he went to Haffords and bought a cigar and went outside to watch the Cowboys. At the time of the gunfight about two hours later, Wyatt could not know if Tom was still armed.

It was early afternoon by the time Ike and Tom had seen doctors for their head wounds. The day was chilly, with snow still on the ground in some places. Both Tom and Ike had spent the night gambling, drinking heavily, and without sleep. Now they were both out-of-doors, both wounded from head beatings, and at least Ike was still drunk.

=== More Cowboys enter town ===
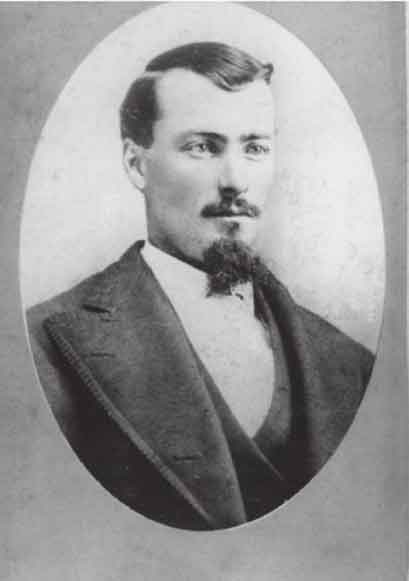
Frank McLaury, killed during the gunfight

At around 1:30–2:00 p.m., after Tom had been pistol-whipped by Wyatt, Ike's 19-year-old younger brother Billy Clanton and Tom's older brother Frank McLaury arrived in town. They had heard from their neighbor, Ed "Old Man" Frink, that Ike had been stirring up trouble in town overnight, and they had ridden into town on horseback to back up their brothers.

They arrived from Antelope Springs, 13 miles (21 km) east of Tombstone, where they had been rounding up stock and had breakfasted with Ike and Tom the day before. Both Frank and Billy were armed with a revolver and a rifle, as was the custom for riders in the country outside Tombstone. Apache warriors had engaged the U.S. Army near Tombstone just three weeks before the O.K. Corral gunfight, so the need for weapons outside of town was well established and accepted.

Billy and Frank stopped first at the Grand Hotel on Allen Street, and were greeted by Doc Holliday. They learned immediately about their brothers' beatings by the Earps within the previous two hours. The incidents had generated a lot of talk in town. Angrily, Frank said he would not drink, and he and Billy left the saloon immediately to seek Tom. By law, both Frank and Billy should have left their firearms at the Grand Hotel. Instead, they remained fully armed.

=== Virgil and Wyatt Earp's reactions ===
Wyatt said that he saw Billy Clanton and Frank McLaury in Spangenberg's gun and hardware store on 4th Street filling their gun and belts with cartridges. Ike testified afterward that Tom was not there and that he had tried to buy a new revolver but the owner saw Ike's bandaged head and refused to sell him one. Ike, apparently, had not heard Virgil tell him that his confiscated weapons were at the Grand Hotel around the corner from Spangenberg's shop.

When Virgil Earp learned that Wyatt was talking to the Cowboys at Spangenberg's gun shop, he went there himself. Virgil testified afterward that he thought he saw all four men, Ike Clanton, Billy Clanton, Frank McLaury, and Tom McLaury, buying cartridges. Virgil went around the corner on Allen Street to the Wells Fargo office, where he picked up a 10-gauge or 12-gauge, short, double-barreled shotgun. It was an unusually cold and windy day in Tombstone, and Virgil was wearing a long overcoat. To avoid alarming Tombstone's public, Virgil hid the shotgun under his overcoat when he returned to Hafford's Saloon.

From Spangenberg's, the Cowboys moved to the O.K. Corral where witnesses overheard them threatening to kill the Earps. For unknown reasons the Cowboys then walked out the back of the O.K. Corral and then west, stopping in a narrow, empty lot next to C. S. Fly's boarding house.

Virgil initially avoided a confrontation with the newly arrived Frank McLaury and Billy Clanton, who had not yet deposited their weapons at a hotel or stable as the law required. The statute was not specific about how far a recently arrived visitor might "with good faith, and within reasonable time" travel into town while carrying a firearm. This permitted a traveler to keep his firearms if he was proceeding directly to a livery, hotel or saloon. The three main Tombstone corrals were all west of 4th Street between Allen and Fremont, a block or two from where Wyatt saw the Cowboys buying cartridges. Miner Ruben F. Coleman later told The Tombstone Epitaph:

I was in the O.K. Corral at 2:30 p.m. when I saw the two Clantons and the two McLaurys in an earnest conversation across the street at Dunbar's corral. I went up the street and notified Sheriff Behan and told them it was my opinion that they meant trouble, and it was his duty, as sheriff, to go and disarm them. I told him they had gone to the West End Corral. I then went and saw Marshal Virgil Earp and notified him to the same effect.

=== Behan attempts to disarm Cowboys ===
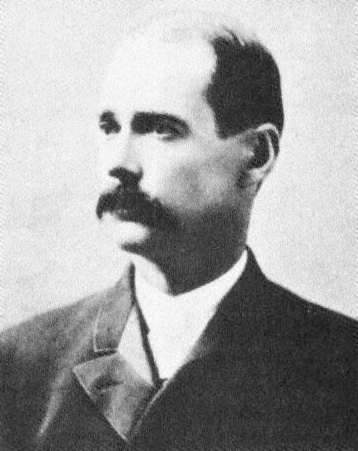
Johnny Behan attempted to arrest the Earps

Cochise County Sheriff Johnny Behan, a friend of the Cowboys, later testified that he woke up about 1:30 p.m. after the late-night card game he went to get a shave at a barbershop. That is where he first learned that the Cowboys were armed. Behan stated he quickly finished his shave and went to locate the Cowboys. At about 2:30 p.m. he found Frank McLaury holding a horse and talking to someone on 4th Street near the corner of Fremont. When he saw Ike Clanton and Tom McLaury near C. S. Fly's photography studio, he walked there with Frank. He told the Cowboys that they must give up their arms. Ike Clanton said he was not armed, and Tom McLaury pulled his coat open to show he was not carrying a weapon.

The Cowboys were located in a narrow 15–20 feet (4.6–6.1 m) lot between the Harwood house and Fly's 12-room boarding house and photography studio at 312 Fremont Street, where Doc Holliday roomed.

Behan later said he attempted to persuade Frank McLaury to give up his weapons, but Frank insisted that he would give up his guns only after City Marshal Virgil Earp and his brothers were first disarmed.

The Cowboys were about a block and a half from the West End Corral at 2nd. Street and Fremont, where Ike and Tom's wagon and team were stabled. Virgil Earp later testified that he thought Ike and Tom were stabled at the O.K. Corral on Allen between 3rd and 4th, from which he thought they would be departing if they were leaving town.

While Ike Clanton later said he was planning to leave town, Frank McLaury reported that he had decided to remain behind to take care of some business. Will McLaury, Tom and Frank's brother and a judge in Fort Worth, Texas, claimed in a letter he wrote during the preliminary hearing after the shootout that Tom and Frank were still armed because they were planning to conduct business before leaving town to visit him in Texas. He wrote that Billy Clanton, who had arrived on horseback with Frank, intended to go with the McLaurys to Fort Worth.

Will McLaury came to Tombstone after the gun fight and joined the prosecution team in an attempt to convict the Earps and Holliday for his brothers' murder. Paul Johnson told a different story, that the McLaurys were about to leave for Iowa to attend the wedding of their sister, Sarah Caroline. Tom and Frank were especially close to Sarah, one of their 14 siblings and half-siblings. Caroline married James Reed in Richland, Iowa at the end of November that year.

=== Virgil decides to disarm Cowboys ===
Citizens reported to Virgil on the Cowboys' movements and their threats told him that Ike and Tom had left their livery stable and entered town while armed, in violation of the city ordinance. Virgil Earp was told by several citizens that the McLaurys and the Clantons had gathered on Fremont Street. Virgil decided he had to disarm the Cowboys. His decision to take action may have been influenced by the Cowboys' repeated threats to the Earps, their proximity to Holliday's room in Fly's boarding house, and their location on the route the Earps usually took to their homes two blocks further west on Fremont Street.

Several members of the citizen's vigilance committee offered to support him with arms, but Virgil refused. He had, during the prior month, appointed Morgan as a Special Policeman. He had also appointed Wyatt as a Special Policeman while Virgil had been in Prescott on business. He had also called on Doc Holliday that morning for help with disarming the Clantons and McLaurys. Wyatt spoke of his brothers Virgil and Morgan as the "marshals" while he acted as "deputy."

Virgil Earp picked up the shotgun he had retrieved from the Wells Fargo office earlier. He gave the shotgun to Doc Holliday who hid it under his overcoat. He took Holliday's walking-stick in return.

As usual, the Earps carried their revolvers in their coat pockets or in their waistbands. Wyatt Earp was carrying a .44 caliber American 1869 Smith & Wesson revolver. Holliday was carrying a nickel-plated pistol in a holster, concealed by his long coat, as was the shotgun. The Earps and Holliday walked west, down the south side of Fremont Street past the rear entrance to the O.K. Corral, but out of visual range of the Cowboys' last reported location.

Near the corner of Fourth St. and Fremont St., the Earps ran into Sheriff Behan. He had left the Cowboys and came toward the Earps, though he looked nervously backward several times. Virgil testified afterward that Behan told them, "For God's sake, don't go down there or they will murder you!" Wyatt said Behan told him and Morgan, "I have disarmed them." Behan testified afterward that he had only said he had gone down to the Cowboys "for the purpose of disarming them," not that he had actually disarmed them. One eyewitness, laundryman Peter H. Fallehy, testified afterward that Virgil Earp told Behan, "those men have made their threats and I will not arrest them but I will kill them on sight."

When Behan said he had disarmed them, Virgil attempted to avoid a fight. "I had a walking stick in my left hand and my hand was on my six-shooter in my waist pants, and when he said he had disarmed them, I shoved it clean around to my left hip and changed my walking stick to my right hand." Wyatt said, "I took my pistol, which I had in my hand, under my coat, and put it in my overcoat pocket." The Earps walked further down Fremont street and came into full view of the Cowboys in the lot.

Wyatt testified he saw "Frank McLaury, Tom McLaury, and Billy Clanton standing in a row against the east side of the building on the opposite side of the vacant space west of Fly's photograph gallery. Ike Clanton and Billy Claiborne and a man I don't know [Wes Fuller] were standing in the vacant space about halfway between the photograph gallery and the next building west." Addie Bourland corroborated Wyatt's testimony, stating that she saw "five men opposite my house, leaning against a small house west of Fly's Gallery and one man was holding a horse, standing a little out from the house."

== The gunfight ==
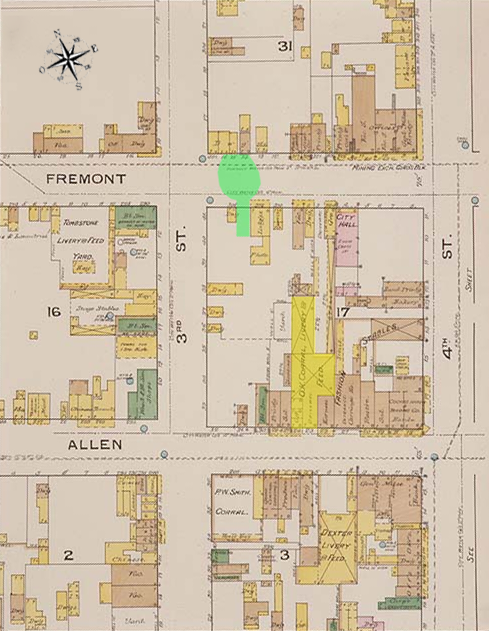
An annotated 1886 fire map of Tombstone, indicating the actual shootout location (in green) and the O.K. Corral (in yellow) on the other side of the block

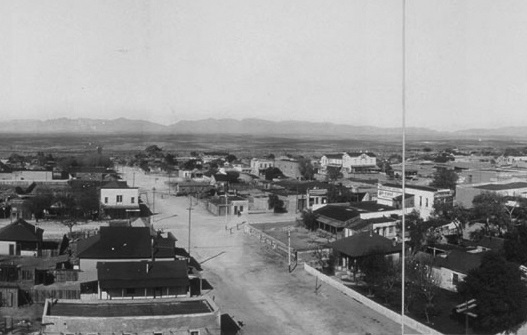
Third St. in Tombstone, Arizona in 1909 from the roof of the Cochise County Courthouse. The O.K. Corral was located on Allen St., the first right turn off Third St. The white building at the center right is Schiefflin Hall on Fremont St. The gunfight took place on Fremont St. between C.S.Fly's photo studio & the Harwood House. Fly's is the first visible structure after the right turn on Fremont St. and the vacant lot where the fight commenced is visible.

Martha J. King was in Bauer's butcher shop located on Fremont Street. She testified that when the Earp party passed by her location, one of the Earps on the outside of the group looked across and said to Doc Holliday nearest the store, "... let them have it!" to which Holliday replied, "All right."

=== Physical proximity ===
When the Earps approached the lot, the four lawmen initially faced six Cowboys: Frank McLaury, Tom McLaury, Billy Clanton, Billy Claiborne, Wes Fuller, and Ike Clanton. When the Cowboys saw the officers, they stepped away from the Harwood house.

In testimony given by witnesses afterward, they disagreed about the precise location of the men before, during and after the gunfight. The coroner's inquest and the Spicer hearing produced a sketch showing the Cowboys standing, from left to right facing Fremont Street, with Billy Clanton and then Frank McLaury near the Harwood house and Tom McLaury and Ike Clanton roughly in the middle of the lot.

Opposite them and initially only about 6 to 10 feet (1.8 to 3.0 m) away, Virgil Earp was on the left end of the Earp party, standing a few feet inside the vacant lot and nearest Ike Clanton. Behind him a few feet near the corner of C. S. Fly's boarding house was Wyatt. Morgan Earp was standing on Fremont Street to Wyatt's right, and Doc Holliday anchored the end of their line in Fremont Street, a few feet to Morgan's right.

Wyatt Earp drew a sketch in 1924 and another with John Flood on September 15, 1926, that depicted Billy Clanton near the middle of the lot, close to the Harwood house. Tom and Frank McLaury stood deeper in the lot. Frank was in the center between the two buildings, holding the reins of his horse. Tom was closer to C. S. Fly's boarding house. According to Wyatt's sketches, Morgan was on the right of the lawmen, close to the Harwood house, opposite Billy Clanton near the Harwood house and close to Fremont St. Virgil was deeper in the lot, opposite Frank and Ike Clanton. Wyatt was to Virgil's left, opposite Tom. Doc Holliday hung back a step or two on Fremont Street. Neither of Wyatt's sketches included Ike Clanton or Billy Claiborne, who ran from the fight.

=== Gun battle begins ===
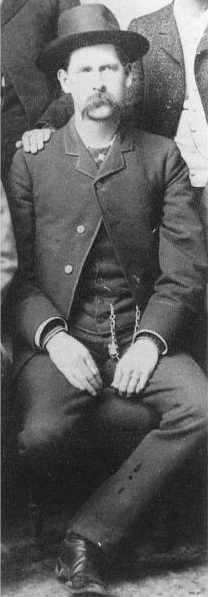
Wyatt Earp 19 months after the famous gunfight, during the bloodless Dodge City War

Virgil Earp was not expecting a fight. After Behan said that he had disarmed the Cowboys, Virgil and Wyatt put the pistols they had been holding in their waistband or overcoat pocket. Holliday had a short coach gun concealed under his long jacket.

Billy Clanton and Frank McLaury wore revolvers in holsters on their belts and stood alongside their saddled horses with rifles in their scabbards conversing with an unknown man, purported to be Calico Jones, possibly in violation of the city ordinance prohibiting carrying weapons in town.

When Virgil saw the Cowboys, he testified, he immediately commanded the Cowboys to "Throw up your hands, I want your guns!" Wyatt said Virgil told the Cowboys, "Throw up your hands; I have come to disarm you!" Virgil and Wyatt both testified they saw Frank McLaury and Billy Clanton draw and cock their single action six shot revolvers as Calico Jones escaped down an adjacent alley back towards The O.K. Corral. Virgil yelled: "Hold! I don't mean that!" or "Hold on, I don't want that!"

Jeff Morey, who served as the historical consultant on the film Tombstone, compared testimony by partisan and neutral witnesses and came to the conclusion that the Earps described the situation accurately.

Who started shooting first is not certain; accounts by both participants and eyewitnesses are contradictory. The smoke from the black powder used in the weapons added to the confusion of the gunfight in the narrow space. Those loyal to one side or the other told conflicting stories, and independent eyewitnesses who did not know the participants by sight were unable to say for certain who shot first. The six or seven men with guns fired about 30 shots in around 30 seconds.

First two shots

Virgil Earp reported afterward, "Two shots went off right together. Billy Clanton's was one of them." Wyatt testified, "Billy Clanton leveled his pistol at me, but I did not aim at him. I knew that Frank McLaury had the reputation of being a good shot and a dangerous man, and I aimed at Frank McLaury." He said he shot Frank McLaury after both he and Billy Clanton went for their revolvers: "The first two shots were fired by Billy Clanton and myself, he shooting at me, and I shooting at Frank McLaury." Morey agreed that Billy Clanton and Wyatt Earp fired first. Clanton missed, but Earp shot Frank McLaury in the stomach.

All witnesses generally agreed that the first two shots were almost indistinguishable from each other. General firing immediately broke out. Virgil and Wyatt thought Tom was armed. When the shooting started, the horse that Tom McLaury held jumped to one side. Wyatt said he also saw Tom throw his hand to his right hip. Virgil said Tom followed the horse's movement, hiding behind it, and fired once or twice over the horse's back.

Holliday shoots Tom

According to one witness, Holliday drew a "large bronze pistol" (interpreted by some as Virgil's coach gun) from under his long coat, stepped around Tom McLaury's horse, and shot him with the double-barreled shotgun in the chest at close range.

Witness C. H. "Ham" Light saw Tom running or stumbling westward on Fremont Street towards Third Street, away from the gunfight, while Frank and Billy were still standing and shooting. Light testified that Tom fell at the foot of a telegraph pole on the corner of Fremont and 3rd Street and lay there, without moving, through the duration of the fight. Fallehy also saw Tom stagger across the street until he fell on his back. After shooting Tom, Holliday tossed the empty shotgun aside, pulled out his nickel-plated revolver, and continued to fire at Frank McLaury and Billy Clanton.

Cowboys run

Ike Clanton had been publicly threatening to kill the Earps for several months, including very loud threats on the day before. Wyatt told the court afterward that Clanton had bragged that he would kill the Earps or Doc Holliday at his first opportunity. However, when the gunfight broke out, Clanton ran forward and grabbed Wyatt, exclaiming that he was unarmed and did not want a fight. To this protest Wyatt said he responded, "Go to fighting or get away!"

Clanton ran through the front door of Fly's boarding house and escaped, unwounded. Other accounts say that Ike drew a hidden pistol and fired at the Earps before disappearing. Like Ike, Billy Claiborne was unarmed. He and Cowboy Wes Fuller, who had been at the rear of the lot, also ran from the fight as soon as the shooting began.

Frank McLaury shot

According to The Tombstone Epitaph, "Wyatt Earp stood up and fired in rapid succession, as cool as a cucumber, and was not hit." Morgan Earp fired almost immediately, as Billy Clanton drew his gun right-handed. Morgan's shot hit Billy in the right wrist, disabling his hand. Forced to shift the revolver to his left hand, Clanton continued shooting until he emptied the gun. Virgil and Wyatt were now firing. Morgan Earp tripped and fell over a newly buried waterline and fired from the ground.

Wyatt shot Frank McLaury in the abdomen, and Frank took his horse by its reins and struggled across Fremont Street. He tried and failed to grab his rifle from the scabbard but lost control of the horse. Frank crossed Fremont Street firing his revolver instead. Frank and Holliday exchanged shots as Frank moved across Fremont Street, and Frank hit Holliday in his pistol pocket, grazing him. Holliday followed him, exclaiming, "That son of a bitch has shot me and I am going to kill him." Morgan Earp picked himself up and also fired at Frank. Frank fell to the sidewalk on the east side of Fremont Street.

A number of witnesses observed a man leading a horse into the street and firing near it and Wyatt in his testimony thought this was Tom McLaury. Claiborne said only one man had a horse in the fight, and that this man was Frank, holding his own horse by the reins, then losing it and its cover, in the middle of the street. Wes Fuller also identified Frank as the man in the street leading the horse.

Morgan Earp wounded

Though wounded, Billy Clanton and Frank McLaury kept shooting. One of them, perhaps Billy, shot Morgan Earp across the back in a wound that struck both shoulder blades and a vertebra. Morgan went down for a minute before picking himself up. Either Frank or Billy shot Virgil Earp in the calf (Virgil thought it was Billy). Virgil, though hit, fired his next shot at Billy Clanton.

Frank, now entirely across Fremont street and still walking at a good pace according to Claiborne's testimony, fired twice more before he was shot in the head under his right ear. Both Morgan and Holliday apparently thought they had fired the shot that killed Frank, but since neither of them testified at the hearing, this information is only from second-hand accounts. A passerby testified to having stopped to help Frank, and saw Frank try to speak, but he died where he fell, before he could be moved.

Billy Clanton was shot in the wrist, chest and abdomen, and after a minute or two slumped to a sitting position near his original position at the corner of the Harwood house in the lot between the house and Fly's Lodging House. Claiborne said Clanton was supported by a window initially after he was shot, and fired some shots after sitting, with the pistol supported on his leg. After he ran out of ammunition, he called for more cartridges, but C. S. Fly took his pistol at about the time the general shooting ended.

A few moments later, Tom McLaury was carried from the corner of Fremont and Third into the Harwood house on that corner, where he died without speaking. Passersby carried Billy Clanton to the Harwood house, where Tom had been taken. Billy was in considerable pain and asked for a doctor and some morphine. He told those near him, "They have murdered me. I have been murdered. Chase the crowd away and from the door and give me air." Billy gasped for air, and someone else heard him say, "Go away and let me die." Ike Clanton, who had repeatedly threatened the Earps with death, was still running. William Cuddy testified that Ike passed him on Allen Street and Johnny Behan saw him a few minutes later on Toughnut Street.

== Outcome of the battle ==
Both Wyatt and Virgil believed Tom McLaury was armed and testified that he had fired at least one shot over the back of a horse. Billy Clanton and Frank McLaury exchanged gunfire with the lawmen. During the gunfight, Doc Holliday was bruised by a bullet fired by Frank that struck his holster and grazed his hip. Virgil Earp was shot through the calf, he thought by Billy Clanton. Morgan Earp was struck across both shoulder blades by a bullet that Morgan thought Frank McLaury had fired. Wyatt Earp was unhurt. Tom McLaury, his brother Frank, and Billy Clanton were killed.

=== Behan attempts arrest ===
As the wounded lawmen were carried to their homes, they passed in front of the Sheriff's Office, and Johnny Behan told Wyatt Earp, "I will have to arrest you." Wyatt paused two or three seconds and replied very forcibly: "I won't be arrested today. I am right here and am not going away. You have deceived me. You told me these men were disarmed; I went to disarm them." George Goodfellow treated the Earps' wounds.

=== Cowboy wounds ===
Henry M. Mathews examined the dead Cowboys late that night. He found Frank McLaury had two wounds: a gunshot beneath the right ear that horizontally penetrated his head, and a second entering his abdomen one inch (2.5 cm) to the left of his navel. Mathews stated that the wound beneath the ear was at the base of the brain and caused instant death. Sheriff Behan testified that he had heard Morgan Earp yell "I got him" after Frank was shot. However, during the gunfight, Frank moved across Fremont street, putting Holliday on Frank's right and Morgan on his left. This makes it much more likely that Holliday shot the fatal round that killed Frank.

When he examined Tom McLaury's body, Mathews found twelve buckshot wounds from a single shotgun blast on the right side under his arm, between the third and fifth ribs. The wound was about four inches (10 cm) across. The nature and location of the wound indicated that it could not have been received if Tom's hands were on his coat lapels as the Cowboys later testified. Both Virgil and Wyatt stated that Holliday had shot Tom, which the coroner's exam supported.

Goodfellow testified about Billy Clanton's wounds at the Spicer hearing. He stated that the angle of the wrist wound indicated that Billy's hand could not have been raised over his head as claimed by Cowboy witnesses. In his coroner's report, Mathews did not mention Billy's arm wound, but witness Keefe, who examined the arm closely, testified later that Clanton was shot through the right arm, close to the wrist joint and the bullet passed through the arm from "inside to outside," entering the arm close to the base of the thumb, and exiting "on the back of the wrist diagonally" with the latter wound larger. This indicated to the judge that Billy could not have been holding his coat's lapels open, his arms raised, as the Cowboys testified.

Mathews found two other wounds on Billy's body. The first was two inches (5 cm) from Clanton's left nipple, and penetrated his lung. The other was in the abdomen beneath the twelfth rib, six inches (20 cm) to the right of the navel. Both were fired from the front. Neither passed completely through his body. The wound to Billy Clanton's right wrist may have been inflicted by Morgan Earp or Doc Holliday immediately at the outset of the fight as Billy was drawing his gun.

=== Weapons carried by the Cowboys ===
Billy Clanton

Billy Clanton was armed with a Colt Frontier Six-Shooter revolver in .44-40 caliber, which was identified by its serial number at the Spicer hearing. C. S. Fly found Billy Clanton's empty revolver in his hand where he lay and took it from him.

Frank McLaury

Frank McLaury was also armed with a Colt Frontier Six-Shooter in .44-40 caliber, which was recovered by laundryman Fallehy on the street about 5 feet (1.5 m) from his body with two rounds remaining in it. Fallehy placed it next to Frank's body before he was moved to the Harwood house. Dr. Mathews laid Frank's revolver on the floor while he examined Billy and Tom. Cowboy witness Wes Fuller said he saw Frank in the middle of the street shooting a revolver and trying to remove a Winchester Rifle from the scabbard on his horse. The two Model 1873 rifles were still in the scabbards on Frank and Tom McLaury's horses when they were found after the gunfight. If, as was customary, Frank carried only five rounds in his revolver, then he had fired only three shots.

Tom McLaury

Witnesses differed about whether Tom McLaury was carrying a weapon during the shootout or not. No revolver or rifle was found near his body and he was not wearing a cartridge belt. Wyatt testified that he had arrested Tom earlier that day when he found him carrying a weapon earlier in violation of a city ordinance. He pistol-whipped him and took him to the courthouse where he was fined. Saloon-keeper Mehan testified that Tom had deposited his revolver at the Capital Saloon on 4th Street and Fremont after his arrest and before the fight, between 1 and 2 p.m. Several Cowboy witnesses testified that Tom was unarmed and claimed that the Earps had murdered a defenseless man.

Behan testified that when he searched Tom McLaury for a weapon prior to the gunfight, he was not thorough, and that Tom might have had a pistol hidden in his waistband. Behan's testimony was significant, since he was a prime witness for the prosecution but had equivocated on this point. Behan's sympathy to the Cowboys was well known, and during the trial he firmly denied he had contributed money to help Ike with his defense costs. However, documents were located in 1997 that showed Behan served as guarantor for a loan to Ike Clanton during the Spicer hearing. Since Wyatt planned to run against Behan for County Sheriff, Behan had an incentive to help convict Wyatt.

A story by Richard Rule in the Cowboy-friendly newspaper, the Nugget, told the story in the manner of the day, without attribution. Rule wrote, "The Sheriff stepped out and said [to the Earps]: 'Hold up boys, don't go down there or there will be trouble; I have been down there to disarm them.'" In his testimony, Behan repeatedly insisted he told the Earps that he only intended to disarm the Cowboys, not that he had actually done so. The article said that Behan "was standing near by commanding the contestants to cease firing but was powerless to prevent it."

The Nugget had a close relationship to Behan. It was owned by Harry Woods, who was also undersheriff to Behan, but Woods was collecting prisoners in El Paso, Texas, that day. So it is extremely likely that Rule interviewed Behan. Both Virgil and Williams' testified that Behan visited Virgil Earp that evening and said, "I am your friend, and you did perfectly right." This corroborated the initial Nugget report, which upon Wood's return was altered to a version that favored the Cowboys and which Behan later supported in his testimony at the hearing.

Though saloon-keeper Andrew Mehan had seen Tom deposit his pistol after his beating by Earp and before the gunfight, none of the Earps had any way of knowing that Tom had left his revolver at the saloon. Hotel keeper Albert "Chris" Billickie, whose father Charles owned the Cosmopolitan Hotel, saw Tom McLaury enter Bauer's butcher shop about 2:00 p.m. He testified that Tom's right-hand pants pocket was flat when he went in but protruded, as if it contained a pistol (so he thought), when he emerged. Retired army surgeon Dr. J. W. Gardiner also testified that he saw the bulge in Tom's pants. However, the bulge in Tom's pants pocket may have been the nearly $3,300 (equivalent to $110,000 in 2025) in cash and receipts found on his body, perhaps in payment for stolen Mexican beef purchased by the butcher.

Wyatt and Virgil Earp and Doc Holliday believed that Tom had a revolver at the time of the gunfight. Wyatt thought Tom fired a revolver under the horse's neck and believed until he died that Tom's revolver had been removed from the scene by Wesley Fuller. Witness Fallehy wrote that he saw Morgan Earp and Doc Holliday shooting at a man who was using a horse to barricade himself, and once shot the man fell. In his statement, Fallehy wrote that the man still held his pistol in his hand. Although he did not see him shoot, he thought Tom McLaury was armed.

Ruben F. Coleman also said afterward that he thought Tom was armed, though he later equivocated on this point. He was quoted in the October 27 issue of The Tombstone Epitaph in which he said, "Tom McLaury fell first, but raised and fired again before he died." Coleman also testified at the coroner's inquest one day later. Part-time newspaper reporter Howell 'Pat' Hayhurst transcribed all of the testimony from the hearing in the early 1930s as part of the Federal Writers' Project, in the Works Progress Administration.

When he transcribed Coleman's second testimony, he quoted Coleman as saying, "Tom McLaury, after the first two shots were fired, ran down Fremont Street and fell ... I think that the report I gave to the Epitaph was pretty near correct as published." However, it is known that Hayhurst arbitrarily removed text that he decided was not relevant. Author Stuart N. Lake later said Hayhurst 'mutilated' the transcription. The documents were subsequently lost and are still unaccounted for.

Even if Tom was not armed with a revolver, Virgil Earp testified Tom attempted to grab a rifle from the scabbard on the horse in front of him before he was killed. Judge Spicer ruled afterward that "if Thomas McLaury was one of a party who were thus armed and were making felonious resistance to an arrest, and in the melee that followed was shot, the fact of his being unarmed, if it be a fact, could not of itself criminate the defendants [Earps], if they were not otherwise criminated."

Ike Clanton and Billy Claiborne

Ike Clanton and Billy Claiborne both said they were unarmed when they fled the gunfight.

== Public reaction ==
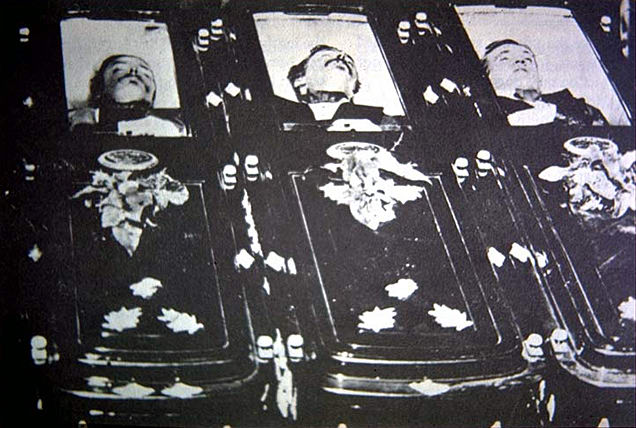
Tom McLaury, Frank McLaury and Billy Clanton (left to right) in the window of the undertakers. This is the only known photo of 19-year-old Billy.

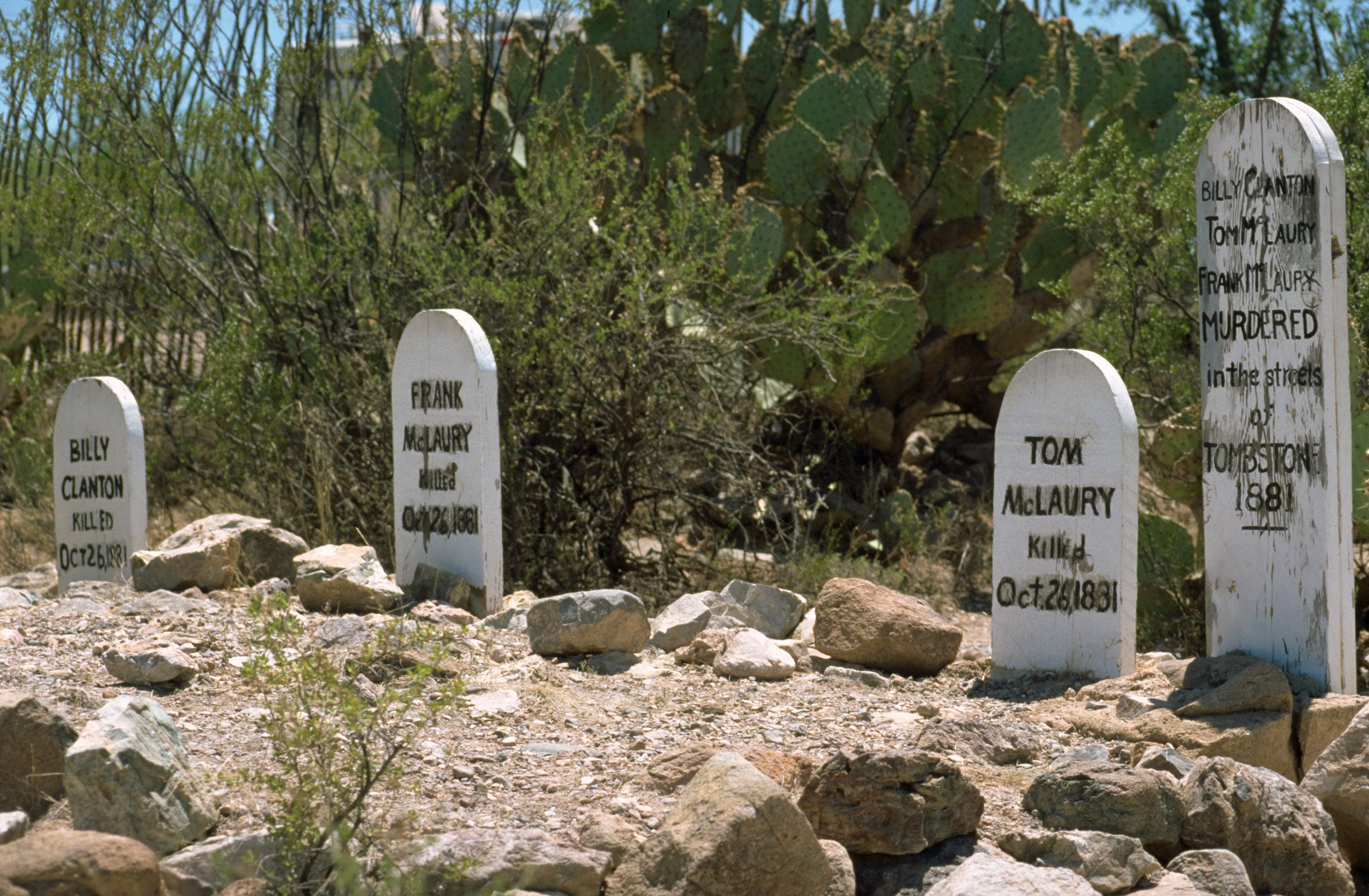
Graves of Tom McLaury, Frank McLaury and Billy Clanton at Boot Hill

The bodies of the three dead Cowboys were displayed in a window at Ritter and Reams undertakers with a sign: "Murdered in the Streets of Tombstone."

=== Sympathy for Cowboys ===
The funerals for Billy Clanton (age 19), Tom McLaury (age 28) and his older brother Frank (age 33) were well attended. About 300 people joined in the procession to Boot Hill and as many as two thousand watched from the sidewalks. Both McLaurys were buried in the same grave, and Billy Clanton was buried nearby. The story was widely printed in newspapers across the United States. Most versions favored the lawmen. The headline in the San Francisco Exchange was, "A Good Riddance".

Three days after the shootout, the ruling of the Coroner's Jury convened by Matthews neither condemned nor exonerated the lawmen for shooting the Cowboys. "William Clanton, Frank and Thomas McLaury, came to their deaths in the town of Tombstone on October 26, 1881, from the effects of pistol and gunshot wounds inflicted by Virgil Earp, Morgan Earp, Wyatt Earp, and one—Holliday, commonly called 'Doc Holliday'."

=== Spicer hearings ===
Four days after the shootout, Ike Clanton filed murder charges against Doc Holliday and the Earps. Wyatt and Holliday were arrested and brought before Justice of the Peace Wells Spicer. Morgan and Virgil were still recovering at home. Only Wyatt and Holliday were required to post $10,000 bail (equivalent to $330,000 in 2025), which was paid by their attorney Thomas Fitch, local mine owner E.B. Gage, Wells Fargo undercover agent Fred Dodge, and other business owners appreciative of the Earps' efforts to maintain order. Virgil Earp was suspended as town marshal pending the outcome of the trial. Justice Spicer convened a preliminary hearing on October 31 to determine if there was enough evidence to go to trial.

The prosecution was led by Republican District Attorney Lyttleton Price, assisted by John M. Murphy, James Robinson, and Ben Goodrich. They were joined by William McLaury, Frank and Tom's older brother, he also being an able attorney, who played a key role on the prosecutor's team. The Earps' attorney Thomas Fitch was an experienced trial lawyer and had earned a reputation as the "silver-tongued orator of the Pacific."

Spicer took written and oral testimony from a number of witnesses over more than a month. Accounts by both participants and eye-witnesses were contradictory. Those loyal to one side or the other told conflicting stories and independent eyewitnesses who did not know the participants by sight were unable to say for certain who shot first.

Cochise County Sheriff Johnny Behan testified on the third day of the hearing. During two days on the stand, he gave strong testimony that the Cowboys had not resisted but either threw up their hands and turned out their coats to show they were not armed. Behan's views turned public opinion against the Earps, who were free on bail. He and other prosecution witnesses testified that Tom McLaury was unarmed, that Billy Clanton had his hands in the air, and that neither of the McLaurys were troublemakers. They portrayed Ike Clanton and Tom McLaury as being unjustly bullied and beaten by the vengeful Earps on the day of the gunfight. On the strength of the prosecution case, Spicer revoked the bail for Doc and Wyatt Earp and had them jailed on November 7. They spent the next 16 days in jail.

Defense accounts contradicted the testimony of Behan, Claiborne and Allen, who all said that a man had fired a nickel-plated pistol first. Claiborne and Allen both said it was Holliday. Virgil, Wyatt and other witnesses testified that Holliday was carrying a shotgun. (Morgan remained bedridden throughout the trial and did not testify.) The prosecution's scenario would have required Holliday to fire with his pistol first, switch to the shotgun to shoot Tom McLaury, then switch back again to his pistol to continue firing.

Three witnesses gave key evidence that swayed Justice Spicer to hold that Virgil had acted within his capacity as town marshal and that there was insufficient evidence to indict the Earps and Doc Holliday for murder.

H.F Sills was an AT&SF RR engineer who had just arrived in town and knew none of the parties involved. He testified that he saw "the marshal go up and speak to this other party. I ... saw them pull out their revolvers immediately. The marshal had a cane in his right hand at the time. He throwed up his hand and spoke. I did not hear the words though. By that time Billy Clanton and Wyatt Earp had fired their guns off." Grilled by the prosecution, he corroborated virtually all of the defense's testimony.

Addie Bourland was a dressmaker whose residence was across Fremont Street from Fly's Boarding House. She testified that she saw both sides facing each other, that none of the Cowboys had held their hands up, that the firing was general, and that she had not seen Billy Clanton fall immediately as the Cowboys had testified.

Judge J.H. Lucas of the Cochise County Probate Court had offices in the Mining Exchange Building about 200 feet (60 m) from the shootout. Lucas corroborated Addie Bourland's testimony that Billy Clanton was standing throughout the fight, which contradicted prosecution witnesses who maintained he went down immediately after being shot at close range in the belly. Spicer noted that no powder burns were found on his clothing.

These witnesses' testimony, especially that of H.F. Sills, a disinterested party, discredited much of the testimony given by Sheriff Johnny Behan, Ike Clanton and the other Cowboy witnesses.

After hearing all the evidence, Justice Spicer ruled on November 30 that Virgil, as the lawman in charge that day, had acted within his office and that there was not enough evidence to indict the men. He described Frank McLaury's insistence that he would not give up his weapons unless the marshal and his deputies also gave up their arms as a "proposition both monstrous and startling!" He noted that the prosecution claimed that the Cowboys' purpose was to leave town, yet Ike Clanton and Billy Claiborne did not have their weapons with them.

Spicer noted that the doctor who examined the dead Cowboys established that the wounds they received could not have occurred if their hands and arms had been in the positions that prosecution witnesses described. Spicer did not condone all of the Earps' actions and criticized Virgil Earp's use of Wyatt and Holliday as deputies, but he concluded that no laws were broken. He said the evidence indicated that the Earps and Holliday acted within the law and that Holliday and Wyatt had been properly deputized by Virgil Earp.

== In popular culture ==
The public perception of the Earp brothers' actions at the time were widely divergent. Even today, the event and its participants are viewed differently by opinionated admirers and detractors. The controversy still stimulates ongoing interest in the gunfight and related events.

=== Gunfight sketch ===
A hand-drawn sketch of the gunfight was made by John Flood with Wyatt Earp's assistance on September 15, 1921; it was sold at auction in October 2010 for $380,000. The map describes the position of a number of witnesses and all of the participants with the exception of Ike Clanton, who fled from the gunfight.

=== Paintings ===
In 1952, Victor Clyde Forsythe, a popular painter of desert scenes and cowboy artist, painted Gunfight at O.K. Corral, a 43 by 60 inches (110 by 150 cm) oil painting. Forsythe's father William Bowen Forsyth and uncle Ira Chandler owned the store Chandler & Forsyth C.O.D. at 328 Fremont Street, west of the back entrance to the O.K. Corral and half a block from the site of the gunfight. They claimed that they had been present and witnessed the shootout. Newspaper accounts of the painting reported that Forsythe had interviewed Tombstone residents and examined many of the existing buildings before beginning to plan his painting. In May 1988, his studio printed and sold a limited edition of 390 copies of the painting.

John Gilchriese became friends with John Flood, who had been Wyatt Earp's secretary, confidante, and best friend for many years. When Earp died, Flood inherited many of his personal belongings. Flood in turn willed them to Gilchriese, who amassed over a number of years one of the largest collections of personal items belonging to Wyatt and Virgil Earp, along with many unpublished photos of them and their family. Gilchriese opened the Wyatt Earp Museum in Tombstone in 1966 and commissioned Western artist Don Perceval to paint the Gunfight at the O.K. Corral.

The oil on masonite painting titled The Street Fight is 6 feet 4 inches by 4 feet 0 inches (1.93 by 1.22 m). It was the largest work ever executed by Perceval. He referred to original documents in Gilchriese's collection, including Wyatt Earp's own diagram of the shootout, and unpublished notes made by John Flood, to create what is regarded as the most accurate depiction of the shootout. Gilchreise had 500 lithographic prints reproduced from the original, which Perceval signed. The prints were sold by the museum for $10 (equivalent to $99 in 2025).

After Gilchriese closed his museum, the painting and other contents of the museum were sold at auction by John's Western Gallery of San Francisco. The estimated auction price for the painting had been $200,000 to $300,000; the final sale price on June 25, 2004, was $40,250. It was put up for auction again on June 14, 2014, with an estimated selling price of $40,000–$60,000 but failed to sell.

=== Origin of the gunfight's name ===
Less than a month after the shootout it was described by a local newspaper as the "Gunfight at The O.K. Corral". William Breakenridge in his 1928 book Helldorado: Bringing Law to the Mesquite described it as "The Incident Near the O.K. Corral". Stuart Lake titled his chapter about the conflict "At the O.K. Corral" in his popular book Wyatt Earp: Frontier Marshal. But it was the popular movie Gunfight at the O.K. Corral that cemented the incident and its erroneous location in popular consciousness. The movie and accompanying mythologizing also altered the way that the public thought of the Earps and the outlaws. Prior to the movie, the media often criticized the Earps' actions in Tombstone. In the movies, they became the good guys, always ready to stand for what is right.

The incident has become a fixture in American history due to the personal nature of the feud between the Earps and the McLaury and Clanton brothers and the symbolism of the fight between lawmen and the Cowboys. The Cowboys maimed Virgil and murdered Morgan but escaped prosecution, and Wyatt's extra-legal campaign for revenge captured people's attention. The gunfight and its aftermath stand for the change overcoming America as the Western frontier ceased to exist, as a nation that was rapidly industrializing pushed out what had been a largely agrarian economy.

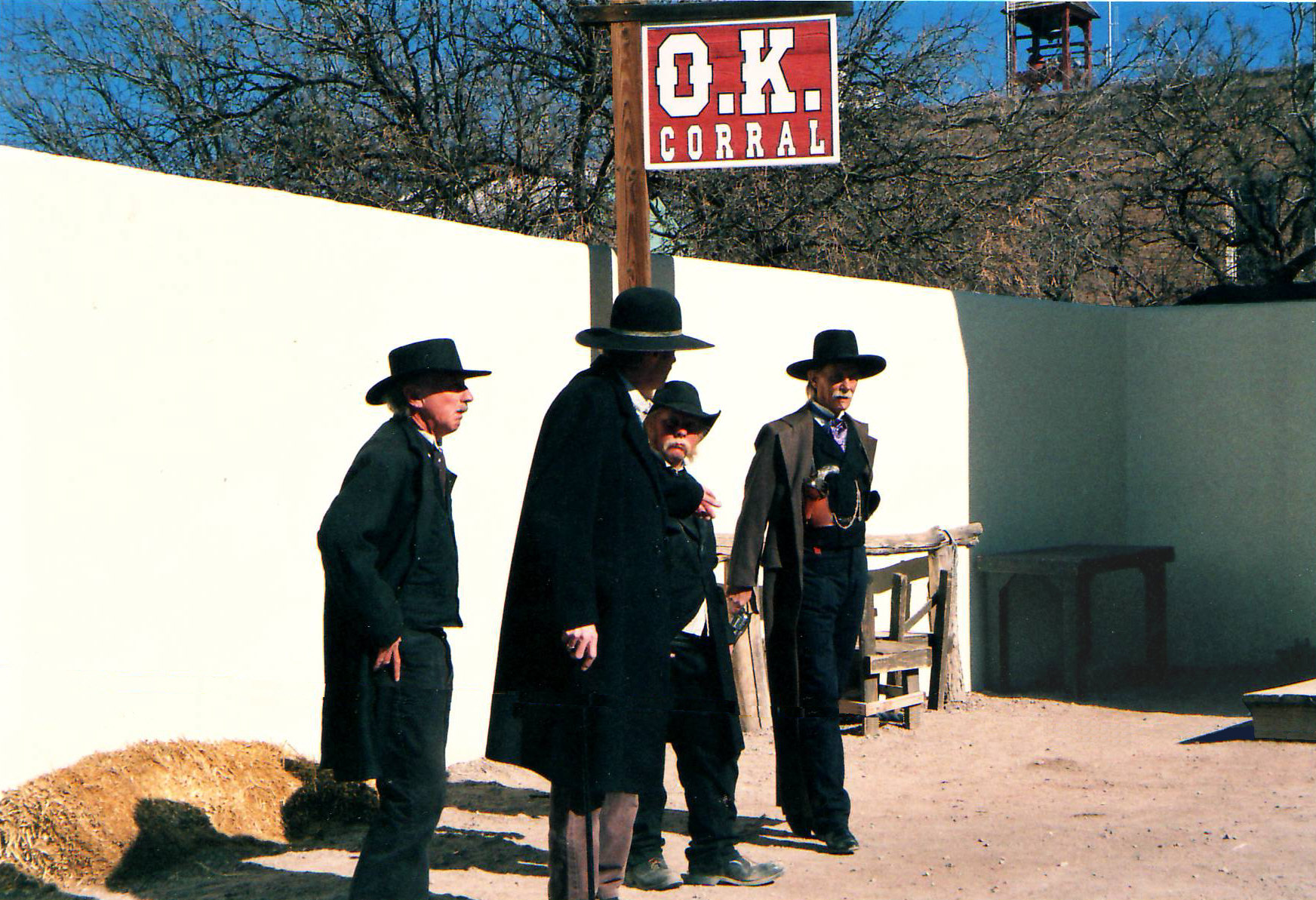
Daily reenactment at the O.K. Corral

The town of Tombstone has capitalized on interest in the gunfight. A portion of the town is a historical district that has been designated a National Historic Landmark and is listed in the National Register of Historic Places by the U.S. National Park Service. A local company produces daily theatrical re-enactments of the gunfight.

=== Film and television ===
With the widespread sales of televisions after World War II, producers spun out a large number of western-oriented shows. At the height of their popularity in 1959, there were more than two dozen "cowboy" programs on each week. At least six of them were directly or indirectly connected with Wyatt Earp: The Life and Legend of Wyatt Earp, Bat Masterson, Tombstone Territory, Broken Arrow, Johnny Ringo, and Gunsmoke. Hugh O'Brian portrayed Earp on the namesake show Wyatt Earp which ran for six seasons, and he was forever associated with that role.

A 2003 episode of Discovery Channel's Unsolved History used modern technology to attempt to re-enact the gunfight. They utilized a movie set to recreate a space similar to the lot where the original gun fight took place. They confirmed that the front-to-back wrist wound suffered by Billy Clanton could only have occurred if his arm was raised in the manner of one holding a pistol, and that the black powder may have obscured the shooters' view of each other. The episode concluded that the three eyewitnesses for the prosecution (Sheriff Behan, Ike Clanton, and Billy Claiborne) likely offered perjured testimony. They found that Tom McLaury may have been hit by the shotgun round under his armpit as he reached over his horse for a rifle in his scabbard, as the horse turned away from him at the same time.

The stories about the gunfight written in the 20th century affected American culture. Numerous dramatic, fictional, and documentary works have been produced about or in reference to the event, with widely varying degrees of accuracy. These works include:

- Law and Order (1932) with Walter Huston, the first film to depict the gunfight
- Frontier Marshal (1939) starring Randolph Scott and directed by Allan Dwan
- Tombstone, the Town Too Tough to Die (1942) with Richard Dix
- My Darling Clementine (1946) with Henry Fonda
- The Life and Legend of Wyatt Earp (1955–1961), TV series with Hugh O'Brian, season 6 episode 36
- Gunfight at the O.K. Corral (1957) with Burt Lancaster and Kirk Douglas
- The Gunfighters (1966), a Doctor Who serial
- Hour of the Gun (1967) with James Garner
- "Spectre of the Gun" (1968), an original Star Trek episode
- Doc (1971) written by Pete Hamill
- "Showdown at O.K. Corral" (1972), an Appointment with Destiny episode that was nominated for an Emmy Award
- An episode of The Goodies, titled "Bunfight at the O.K. Tea Rooms" (1975) was a spoof of many Western tropes and its climax was the eponymous shootout, involving tomato sauce squirters as weapons.
- In the Where on Earth Is Carmen Sandiego?, 1st season episode; "The Good Old, Bad Old Days" (1994), Carmen stole some cowboy clothing during a reenactment of the gun fight.
- "Ghost Fight at the OK Corral" (1987), The Real Ghostbusters season 2 episode 47
- Tombstone (1993) with Kurt Russell
- Wyatt Earp (1994) with Kevin Costner
- "Shootout at Fly's Photographic Studio", a History Bites episode
- "Rule of the Gun" (2004), an episode of Days That Shook the World
- Tombstone Rashomon (2017), a film by Alex Cox
- "Lincoln" (2026), an Life, Larry and the Pursuit of Unhappiness episode

=== In print ===
- Saint Johnson (1930), ISBN 978-2330051051 – A novel by W.R. Burnett. A thinly fictionalized depiction of the conflict between the outlaws and the law officers.
- Who Rides with Wyatt (1955), ISBN 978-0843942927 – A novel by Will Henry.
- Warlock (1958), ISBN 978-1590171615 – A novel by Oakley Hall.
- Bloody Season (1987), ISBN 978-0515125313 – A novel by Loren D. Estleman, a carefully researched depiction of events leading up the shootout and gunfight itself.
- Christ Versus Arizona (1988), ISBN 978-8432205828 – A novel by Spanish Nobel winner Camilo José Cela, it consists of a single sentence that is more than one hundred pages long.
- Frontier Earth (1999), ISBN 978-0441005895 – a sci-fi/western novel by actor Bruce Boxleitner, about the events leading up to the gunfight.
- The Return of Little Big Man (1999), ISBN 978-0316091176 – in which novelist Thomas Berger's wandering protagonist Jack Crabb becomes a witness to the event.
- Gunman's Rhapsody (2001), ISBN 978-0425182895 – by Robert B. Parker
- Telegraph Days (2006), ISBN 978-0739470169 – a novel by Larry McMurtry, includes a representation of the gunfight, told by a fictional journalist and eyewitness
- Territory (2007), ISBN 978-0312857356 – a novel by Emma Bull offers a fantasy retelling of the events leading up to the fight.
- The Buntline Special (2010), ISBN 978-1616142490 – by Mike Resnick, a Steampunk re-imagining of the gunfight.
- The Last Kind Words Saloon (2014), ISBN 978-0393351194 – by Larry McMurtry, culminates with a version of the gunfight.
- Epitaph: A Novel of the O.K. Corral (2015), ISBN 978-0062198778 – by Mary Doria Russell tells Wyatt Earp's story.
- Tombstone: The Earp Brothers, Doc Holliday, and the Vendetta Ride from Hell (2020), ISBN 978-1250214591 by Tom Clavin

=== In mathematics ===
David Williams and Paul McIlroy introduced a mathematical model for the O.K. Corral gunfight, which they published in Bulletin of the London Mathematical Society (1998). Later this model was analyzed by Sir John Kingman (1999, 2002), and Kingman and Volkov (2003). They analyzed the probability of "survival of exactly S gunmen given an initially fair configuration."

== See also ==
- Arizona Territory in the American Civil War
- Confederate Arizona
- Earp Vendetta Ride
- Pleasant Valley War
- Ten Percent Ring
