= Coach gun =

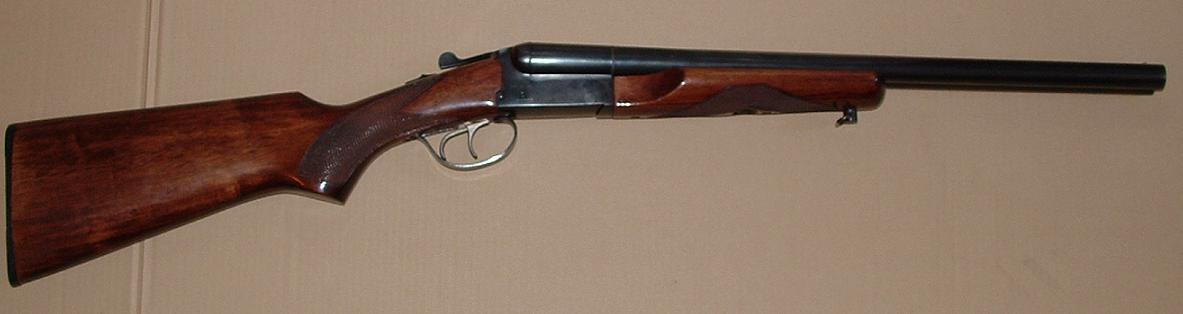
- A Stevens Model 311 Coach gun
- Type: Shotgun
- Place of origin: United States

Service history
- Used by: Various law enforcement agencies Stagecoach Companies

Production history
- Designed: 1858
- Manufacturer: Various
- Produced: 1858–present

Specifications
- Length: 39 in. (991mm)
- Barrel length: 18 in. (457mm)
- Caliber: 10 and 12-gauge
- Action: Break-action
- Sights: Bead

A coach gun is a double-barreled shotgun, generally with side-by-side barrels 18 to 24 inches (460 to 610 mm) long. It was called a "cut-down shotgun" and a "messenger's gun" from the use of such shotguns on stagecoaches by shotgun messengers in the American Wild West. The name "coach gun" is a modern term used by gun-collectors.

== Origins ==
The terms "cut-down shotgun" or "messenger's gun" were coined in the 1860s when Wells Fargo & Co. assigned messengers armed with shotguns, called "shotgun messengers", to guard its express consignments on express overland vehicles in California. The phrase riding shotgun was not coined until 1919.

There was no single manufacturer for the traditional messenger's gun, as it was a generic term describing a class of shotguns offered in a variety of barrel lengths from 18 to 24 inches (460 to 610 mm) (versus 28 to 36 inches (710 to 910 mm) for bird hunting guns), either by the factory or from owners and gunsmiths cutting down the barrels.

== Early manufacturers ==
These shotguns featured external hammers and were manufactured primarily by Remington Arms, Ithaca, Colt's Manufacturing Company, Parker, L.C. Smith, and several Belgian makers. Contrary to myth, Wells Fargo shotguns were not purchased by local agents; prior to 1900 they were purchased from San Francisco gun dealers because Wells Fargo's headquarters were located in San Francisco. From 1908 to 1918 all Wells Fargo shotguns were made by Ithaca.

== Use in the Old West ==
According to one account, Doc Holliday used a 10 gauge Wm. Moore & Co. coach gun to shoot Tom McLaury point-blank in the chest with buckshot during the Gunfight at the OK Corral in Tombstone, Arizona, on Wednesday, October 26, 1881. They stood in such close proximity that the town mortician was able to cover McLaury's wound with one hand. Wyatt Earp also used both barrels of a 10 gauge coach gun to kill Frank Stilwell at a Tucson, Arizona rail yard and to kill "Curly" Bill Brocius point-blank the next year during the shootout at Iron Springs. However, according to another account, both men used Greeners.

== Modern makers ==
Modern coach guns are manufactured by ER Amantino (sold as Stoeger) (Brazil), IZH/Baikal (Russia) (which is distributed by Remington under the name Spartan Gunworks), Huglu Armsco (Turkey), Khan (Turkey), Diamond (Turkey), and a variety of Chinese companies for US distribution through Century International Arms and Interstate Armscorp.

== Modern usage ==
Modern coach guns are commonly encountered in Cowboy Action Shooting competitions, among collections of Western guns, as home-defense weapons, and even as "scrub guns" for hunting grouse, woodcock, rabbit, hare, and/or wild pig in scrub, bush or marshlands, where the 24"+ barrels of a traditional shotgun would prove unwieldy. The modern coach gun can be had in a variety of configurations suitable for both Cowboy Action Shooting competition and hunting.

Coach guns are similar to sawn-off shotguns but differ in that coach guns manufactured after 1898 are offered as new with 18" barrels and 26" overall length and meet legal requirements for civilian possession in the United States. Australia and New Zealand have slightly different laws for length, with NZ requiring a minimum overall length of 30" (anything shorter is considered a pistol) with no minimum barrel length and Australia requiring an 18" barrel and a 30" overall length. In the United Kingdom, however, shotguns must have a minimum barrel length of 24" to be eligible for ownership on a Shotgun Certificate, and shotguns with barrels under this length (which includes Coach guns) must be obtained on the more stringent Firearms Certificate. Some modern coach guns feature internal hammers as opposed to the traditional external hammers.

== Legacy ==
It is because of this gun and its usage that the term "riding shotgun" came to be. Typically, a cut-down shotgun would be carried by the messenger sitting next to the stagecoach driver, ready to use the gun to ward off bandits. In modern American and Canadian vernacular, the term "riding shotgun" refers to the person sitting in the front passenger seat of an automobile.

== See also ==
- Blunderbuss
- Lupara
- Stagecoaching
