= Don Louis Perceval =

English artist (1908–1979)

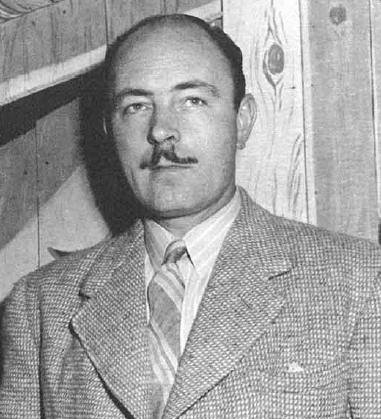
Don Louis Perceval, 1948.

Don Louis Perceval (8 January 1908 – 17 August 1979) was a British artist and illustrator. Having spent much of his childhood in Southern California, he was fascinated by the American Southwest and the art, history and culture of the Hopi and Navajo peoples. He also served in the British Navy during World War II and later taught art in California. Over his career, he was well respected for his carefully researched and detailed illustrations.

== Early life ==
Born in Woodford (now in London, then in Essex), Perceval was the son of two accomplished artists. His family's relocation to Hollywood, California in 1920 exposed him to California's history and the rich lore of the American Southwest. He studied art at the Pasadena Military Academy and later the Chouinard Art Institute (California Institute of the Arts), learning under renowned artists Nelbert Chouinard and F.T. Chamberlain. By age 19, Perceval had already earned his first commission as an illustrator (Harry James, The Treasure of the Hopitu). Later, his trips to Arizona in 1927 kindled his love for the Hopi and Navajo way of life. In his late 20s, Perceval returned to England, immersing himself in classical art at London's Royal Academy of Arts and the Heatherley School of Fine Art. Perceval's exposure to European art, combined with time spent in Spain and throughout Europe, enriched his perspective, yet the allure of the Southwest remained.During this period, Perceval put his love for Western art to use, earning a commission creating advertisements for the Rio Grande Oil Company. During World War II, Perceval returned to England and served in the Royal Navy for six years, including using his artistic skills to create a cartoon manual for gunnery training. After the war, Perceval returned to California, where he accepted teaching positions with the Chouinard Art Institute, the Trailfinder School for Boys and Pomona College.

== Career ==
While working as a teacher, Perceval continued with his commercial illustrating work, creating a prized and memorable series of travel posters extolling the virtues of the Southwest for the Santa Fe Railway. Perceval's passion for the Southwest led him to live with the Hopi in 1952 and in Tucson, Arizona from 1954 to 1959. Perceval also became an adopted member of the Hopi and illustrated a respected sociological study of the Hopi people authored by Harry James, The Hopi Indians (1956). Perceval's ongoing commitment to historical accuracy further enhanced his reputation as a sought-after illustrator. "To be of value," he wrote, "illustrations must be historically accurate; otherwise periods tend to merge into a conglomerate mass, thereby defeating the entire purpose of history teaching." Perceval illustrated numerous books including Charles Loomis' General Crook and the Apache Wars (1966), Leo Carrillo's The California I Love (1962) and his own A Navajo Sketchbook (1962). Perceval also wrote extensively about cattle and horse brands, viewing brands as a unique art form and tracing their origins back to ancient times. In total, Perceval illustrated more than 50 books featuring his beloved Western themes. Later in his career, Perceval was an active member of the Los Angeles Corral of Westerners where, after joining in 1947, he shared his expertise in Western history and illustration.

== Later life, death and legacy ==
Perceval spent the last 20 years of his life in Santa Barbara, California. His 1966 painting The Street Fight, painted while he was living in Santa Barbara, was recognized at the time as the most accurate portrayal of the infamous gunfight at the O.K. Corral. He also spent time in his later years visiting Tucson and indulging his love for the Southwest. He was a member of E Clampus Vitus and illustrated the official coat of arms for the secret society. Don Louis Perceval died in 1979, survived by his wife Edith and daughter Donna.

Between May 1 and August 17, 2025, the Santa Barbara Historical Museum featured a retrospective of Perceval's art entitled Don Louis Perceval: His Vision of the West.
