= Fred White (marshal) =

American town marshal (1849–1880)

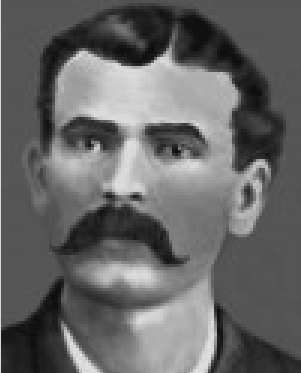
- Portrait of White, c. 1880
- Born: Frederick G. White c. 1849; New York City
- Died: October 30, 1880 (aged 30–31); Tombstone, Arizona Territory
- Occupation: Marshal
- Known for: First Tombstone town marshal

Frederick G. White (c. 1849 – October 30, 1880) was an American lawman and the first town marshal (equivalent to chief of police) of the mining boomtown of Tombstone, Arizona Territory. White was elected to the position on January 6, 1880. At the time, Tombstone was still an emerging frontier town with fewer than 1,000 residents, and did not become an official city, with over 1,000 residents, until a year later. Before that time, White died in office following a notorious accidental shooting, and was succeeded by Virgil Earp.

== Tombstone ==
Fred White was born in New York City, according to the 1880 Census. In the months before his killing, White formed an alliance and friendship with Wyatt Earp (then deputy undersheriff for the southern portion of Pima County, which included Tombstone). White had established himself as a likable and professional lawman, and contrary to later depictions in film, was well-respected by the area's less reputable elements, including the Cowboys. He often arrested individual Cowboys but rarely had any problems. On the rare occasion that one resisted arrest, he used force as needed, and seemingly had the support of other Cowboys in doing so. White got along particularly well with "Curly" Bill Brocius, and Brocius often joked with him.

White was regarded as removed from the complex business, personal, and political rivalries that involved many of Tombstone's residents at the time. Unlike other city employees (including Earp and his siblings), who owned or partly owned many of the town's businesses and tried to steer its populace and visitors towards those under their ownership, White had no personal stake in any such enterprises, settling instead for his regular salary as town marshal. He was respected by the town in general and by all accounts treated everyone fairly.

== Death ==
On the night of October 28, 1880, several Cowboys entered town and began drinking, with several of them firing their pistols in the air at different locations. Marshal White proceeded to confront each of them and disarm them. All of those confronted by him gave up their weapons voluntarily, without incident. Late that night, White encountered "Curly Bill" Brocius at the east end of town, on a dark street in a vacant lot where the Birdcage Theater now stands. Brocius was intoxicated and he (or his companions) were firing pistols into the air. White instructed Brocius to surrender his pistol. Brocius did this by pulling the weapon out of his pocket, handing it barrel-first to White. Wyatt Earp later claimed that he thought the pistol's hammer was "half-cocked" over a live round (it was later found to have contained six live rounds). When White grabbed the barrel and pulled, the weapon discharged, shooting White in the groin area.

Wyatt Earp, who witnessed the shooting and flash but could not clearly see the action in the dark, pistol-whipped Brocius, knocking him unconscious, and arrested him. Wyatt told his biographer many years later that he thought Brocius was still armed at the time and did not notice that Brocius' pistol lay on the ground in the dark until Brocius was already down. Brocius was arrested by Wyatt Earp and his brother Morgan, both of whom were working as Pima County sheriff's deputies at the time.

Brocius was said to have terribly regretted the shooting of White, whom Brocius apparently liked, and maintained that it was an accident. The next day, Wyatt Earp and another deputy took Brocius to the county jail in the county seat of Tucson, possibly saving him from being lynched when White later died (at the time, Tombstone had a one-room wooden jail very near the scene of the shooting, which was famous for its flimsiness).

White lingered for two days, dying on October 30, 1880. However, prior to his death, he gave testimony that ultimately led to Brocius being cleared of any wrongdoing. White stated that the pistol fired accidentally, and that Brocius, intoxicated, evidently did not realize the pistol was cocked. It was due to White's testimony, as well as a demonstration for the court that Brocius' pistol could be fired from the half-cock position, that Judge Neugass in Tucson dismissed the charge against Brocius.

Despite his regret over the shooting death of White and his assistance from Earp in being taken out of town (Earp also ended up testifying on his behalf), Brocius resented having been pistol-whipped by Earp during his arrest. This was one factor that led to increasing tensions between the Earps and the Cowboys. After the Gunfight at the O.K. Corral a year later and the murder of Morgan Earp in March 1882, Wyatt Earp pursued and killed Brocius in a gunfight in the countryside outside Tombstone.

White was buried in what is now known as Boot Hill cemetery (i.e., the old city cemetery), in Tombstone.

== Portrayals ==
Although White is portrayed in the 1993 film Tombstone by Harry Carey, Jr., as an elderly or older man, he was actually only 31 or 32 years of age at the time of his death. He was also played by Boots Southerland in the 1994 film Wyatt Earp.

Police appointments
Preceded by New office	City Marshal of Tombstone, Arizona; January 6, 1880–October 30, 1880	Succeeded by Virgil Earp
