= John H. Flood Jr. =

Mining engineer and personal secretary/biographer of Wyatt Earp (1878–1958)

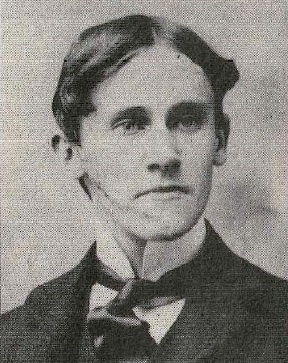
- John H. Flood Jr.
- Born: January 16, 1878; Connecticut
- Died: March 29, 1958 (aged 80)
- Occupations: Engineer, secretary

John Henry Flood Jr. (January 16, 1878 – March 29, 1958) was a mining engineer who worked as Wyatt Earp's unpaid personal secretary late in Earp's life, completing the only authorized biography of Earp. The language Flood used in the biography was very overblown, florid and stilted, so he was unable to find a publisher.

== Earp's reputation ==
For much of his life after the Gunfight at the O.K. Corral, Earp was the subject of a large number of articles disparaging his character. On April 16, 1894, the Fort Worth Gazette wrote that Deputy U.S. Marshal Virgil Earp and Cochise County Sheriff Johnny Behan had a "deadly feud". It described Behan as "an honest man, a good official, and possessed many of the attributes of a gentleman". Earp, on the other hand, "was head of band of desperadoes, a partner in stage robbers, and a friend of gamblers and professional killers... Wyatt was the boss killer of the region."

On December 2, 1896, Wyatt refereed the Fitzsimmons vs. Sharkey boxing match. He called the match in Sharkey's favor, even though Fitizsimmons had dominated the match and Sharkey was down. Newspaper accounts and testimony over the next two weeks revealed a conspiracy among the boxing promoters to fix the fight's outcome. Earp was parodied in editorial cartoon caricatures and vilified in newspaper stories across the United States.

On March 12, 1922, the Sunday Los Angeles Times ran a short, scandalous article titled "Lurid Trails Are Left by Oldentime Bandits" by J. M. Scanland. It described Wyatt and his brothers as a gang who waylaid the cowboys in the gunfight at the O.K. Corral. It said that the Earps were allies of Frank Stilwell, who had informed on them, so they killed him, and that Earp had died in Colton, California.

The article galvanized Earp. He was tired of all the lies perpetuated about him and became determined to get his story accurately told.

== Earp biography ==
In about 1923, Charles Welsh, a retired railroad engineer and friend that Earp had known since Dodge City, frequently invited the Earps to visit his family in San Bernardino. When the Welsh family moved to Los Angeles, the Earps accepted an invitation to stay with them for a while in their top floor apartment until the Earps found a place to rent.

Starting in 1925, Flood attempted to write an authorized biography of Earp's life, based on Earp's recollections as told to Flood. The two men sat together every Sunday in the kitchen of Earp's modest, rented bungalow. While Wyatt sipped a drink and smoked a cigar, they tried to tell Earp's story. But Earp's wife Josephine (nicknamed "Sadie") was always present and often intervened. She would stop them and insist "You can't write that! It needs to be clean". She also demanded that they add more "pep" to the manuscript, which in her mind meant including the word "CRACK!" in all caps. In the chapter about the shootout, the manuscript includes 109 uses of "CRACK". She thought Earp needed to be shown as a hero, and the manuscript includes a chapter titled "Conflagration" in which Earp saves two women, one a cripple, from a fire.

In 1990, Charlie Welsh's daughter, Grace Spolidora, was interviewed by a member of the San Bernardino Historical Society. She had been a teenager during the Earps' many visits to the family home near Needles, California and sometimes went to San Diego with them. She attributed the highly exaggerated stories about Wyatt Earp to Josephine. She said Sadie "would always interfere whenever Wyatt would talk with Stuart Lake. She always interfered! She wanted him to look like a church-going saint and blow things up. Wyatt didn't want that at all!"

The manuscript was apparently typed by Flood, who was an expert typist. Flood and Earp submitted the 348-page manuscript to multiple periodicals, all without success. Editors replied, "We have been unable to find a place for it in the Saturday Evening Post." Another wrote, "We do not care particularly for the style in which it is written." In February 1927, Bobbs Merrill editor Anne Johnston was especially forthright and critical of the work: "I am deeply disappointed... The writing is stilted, florid and diffuse." She noted, “Now one forgets what it’s all about in the clutter of unimportant details that impedes its pace, and the pompous manner of its telling.”

An excerpt describes the OK Corral gunfight:

“Throw up your hands, Clanton!” “All of you.”

Crack!—–e-e-e-e-e-ING! “Uh!” and Morgan Earp went reeling, crashing into his brother Wyatt, at his left, while a trickle of red spouted form end to end of his shoulders as the bullet ploughed its way through. And a ring of smoke drifted into the lot from beneath the neck of Tom McLowery’s horse, the first shot of the day.

Crack! And McLowery’s horse went into the air, the flash from Wyatt’s gun streaking half way down the lot as Tom McLowery’s head appeared above the animals’ neck. With the blood spurting from a wound in its withers, the horse darted into the road…

Due to Flood's poor writing style, the completed manuscript was never published.

A carbon copy of the manuscript was found in Josephine Earp's effects after her death. Amateur historian Glenn Boyer obtained the carbon copy and had 99 facsimile copies made, bound in gilt leather, which he sold to collectors in 1981. In 2019 a rare book collector offered to sell a copy for $3,500. Boyer gave the original carbon copy of the typed manuscript to the Ford County Historical Society. When Earp died, Flood inherited many of his personal belongings. Flood in turn willed them to John Gilchriese.
