= Riding shotgun =

Person next to the driver, turned into a game

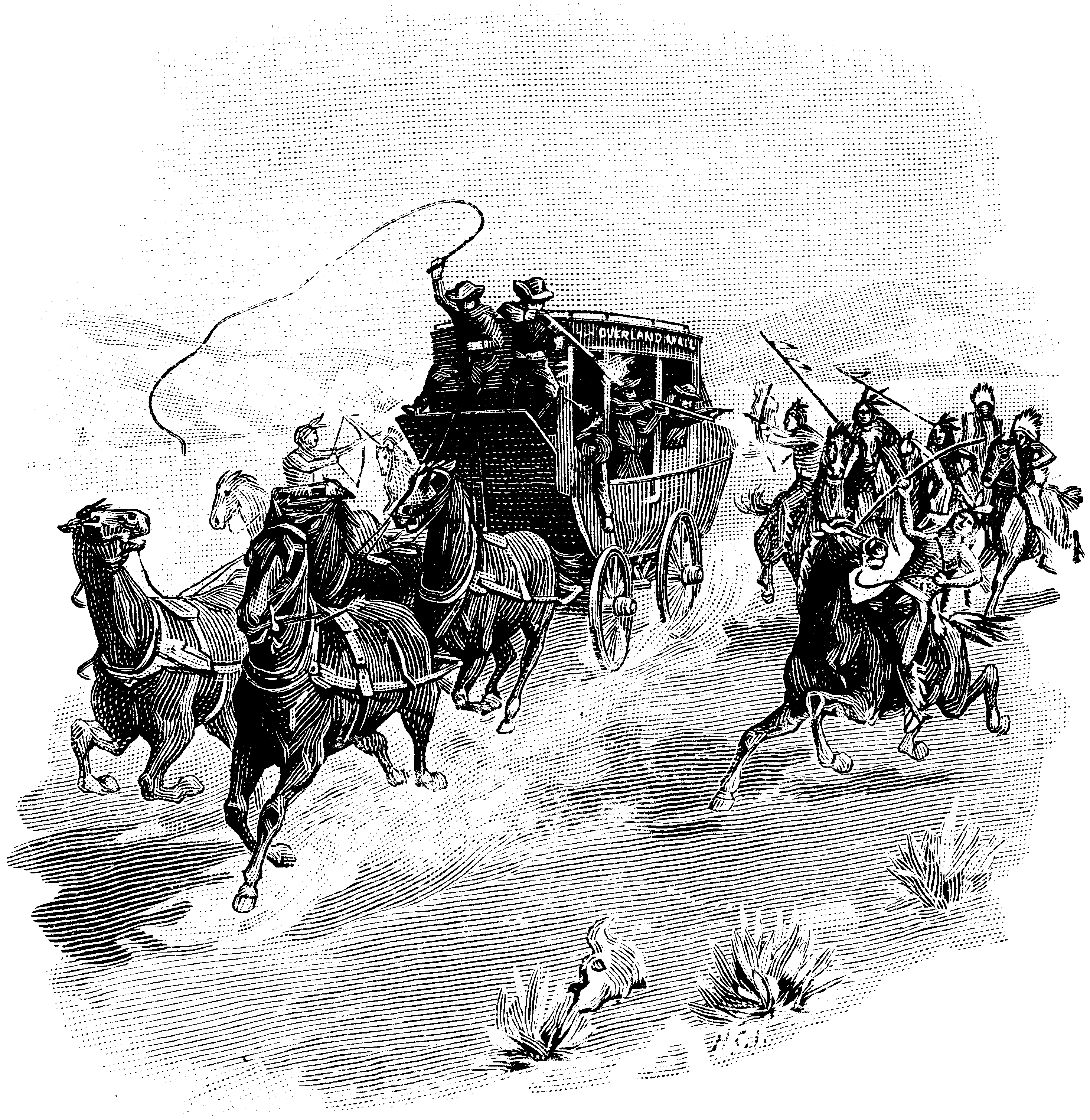
- The driver is holding the whip with the shotgun messenger on his left.
- Origin: A guard riding alongside a stagecoach driver (derived from "shotgun messenger")
- Coined by: Alfred Henry Lewis (1905)
- Meaning: Sitting next to the driver in a moving vehicle; Giving support or aid to someone

"Riding shotgun" was a phrase used to describe the guard who rides alongside a stagecoach driver, typically armed with a break-action shotgun, called a coach gun, to ward off bandits or hostile Native Americans. In modern use, it refers to the practice of sitting alongside the driver in a moving vehicle. The coining of this phrase dates to 1905 at the latest.

== Etymology ==
The expression "riding shotgun" is derived from "shotgun messenger", a colloquial term for "express messenger", when stagecoach travel was popular during the American Wild West and the Colonial period in Australia. The person rode alongside the driver. The first known use of the phrase "riding shotgun" was in the 1905 novel The Sunset Trail by Alfred Henry Lewis.

Wyatt and Morgan Earp were in the service of The Express Company. They went often as guards—"riding shotgun," it was called—when the stage bore unusual treasure.

— Alfred Henry Lewis, The Sunset Trail, Chapter 14

It was later used in print and especially film depiction of stagecoaches and wagons in the Wild West in danger of being robbed or attacked by bandits. A special armed employee of the express service using the stage for transportation of bullion or cash would sit beside the driver, carrying a short shotgun (or alternatively a rifle), to provide an armed response in case of threat to the cargo, which was usually a strongbox. Absence of an armed person in that position often signaled that the stage was not carrying a strongbox, but only passengers.

== Historical examples ==
=== Tombstone, Arizona Territory ===
On the evening of March 15, 1881, a Kinnear & Company stagecoach carrying US$26,000 in silver bullion (equivalent to $867,000 in 2025) was en route from the boom town of Tombstone, Arizona Territory to Benson, Arizona, the nearest freight terminal. Bob Paul, who had run for Pima County Sheriff and was contesting the election he lost due to ballot-stuffing, was temporarily working once again as the Wells Fargo shotgun messenger. He had taken the reins and driver's seat in Contention City because the usual driver, a well-known and popular man named Eli "Budd" Philpot, was ill. Philpot was riding shotgun.

Near Drew's Station, just outside Contention City, a man stepped into the road and commanded them to "Hold!" Three cowboys attempted to rob the stage. Paul, in the driver's seat, fired his shotgun and emptied his revolver at the robbers, wounding a cowboy later identified as Bill Leonard in the groin. Philpot, riding shotgun, and passenger Peter Roerig, riding in the rear dickey seat, were both shot and killed. The horses spooked and Paul wasn't able to bring the stage under control for almost a mile, leaving the robbers with nothing. Paul, who normally rode shotgun, later said he thought the first shot killing Philpot had been meant for him.

When Wyatt Earp first arrived in Tombstone in December 1879, he took a job as a stagecoach shotgun messenger for Wells Fargo, guarding shipments of silver bullion. When Earp was appointed Pima County Deputy Sheriff on July 27, 1881, his brother Morgan Earp took over his job.

=== Historical weapon ===
When Wells, Fargo & Co. began regular stagecoach service from Tipton, Missouri to San Francisco, California in 1858, they issued shotguns to its drivers and guards for defense along the perilous 2,800 mile route. The guard was called a shotgun messenger and they were issued a Coach gun, typically a 10-gauge or 12-gauge, short, double-barreled shotgun.

== Modern usage ==
The term has been applied to an informal game, typically played by younger people. When three or more people are getting into a vehicle, the first person to say "shotgun" determines who rides beside the driver. Specific rules used vary.

== See also ==
- Coach gun
- Drive-by shooting
- Shotgun messenger
