= Shotgun messenger =

Private messenger and guard for rail or stagecoach transit

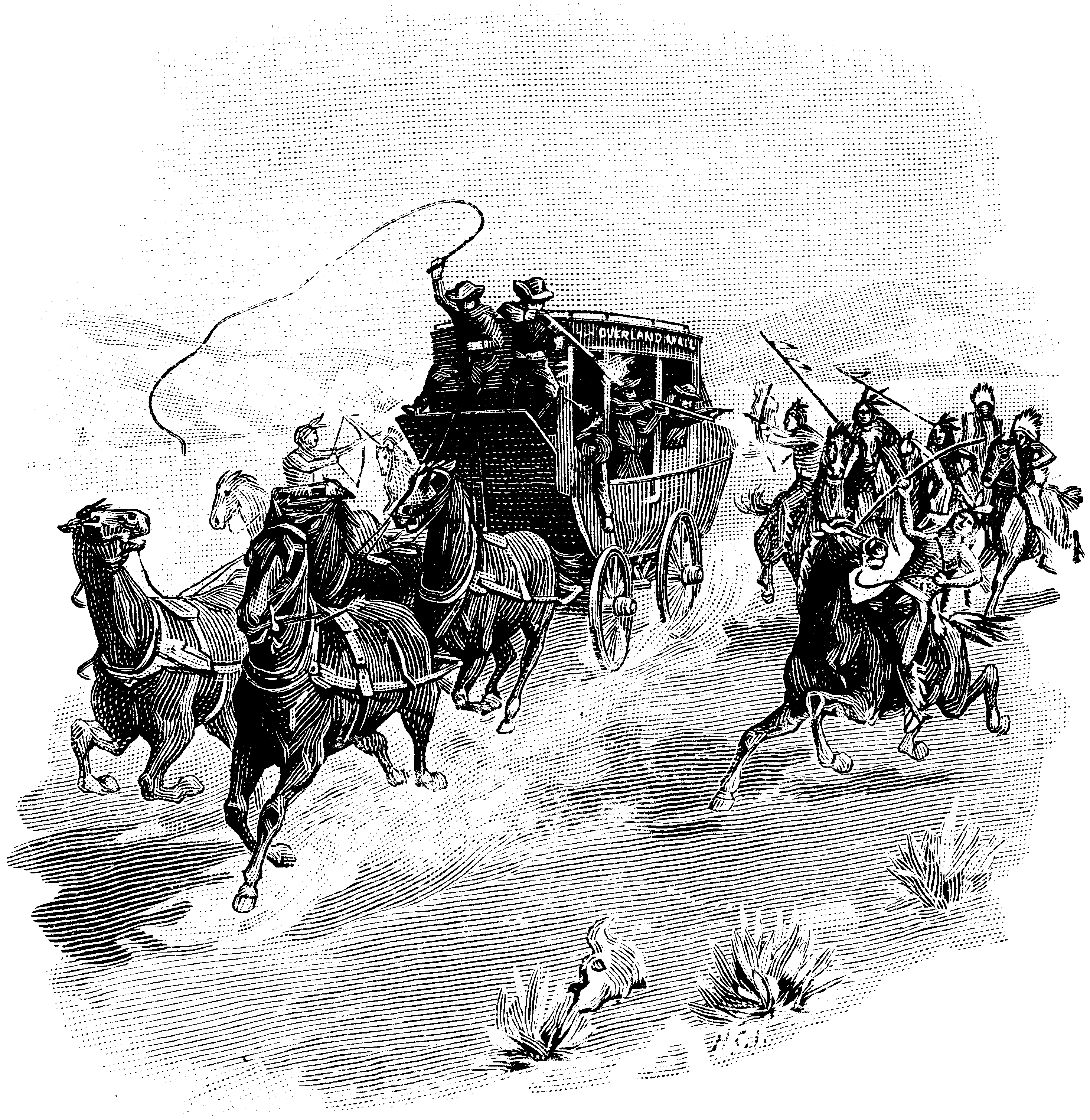
A 1904 drawing of an Overland Mail stagecoach under attack—note guard with shotgun sitting to the left of the driver

In the late 19th and early 20th centuries, a shotgun messenger was a private "express messenger" and guard, especially on a stagecoach but also on a train, in charge of overseeing and guarding a valuable private shipment, such as particularly the contents of a strongbox (on a stagecoach) or safe (on a train).

== History ==
In the American Old West, express messengers of the Wells Fargo company typically carried a short (or sawn-off) 12- or 10-gauge double-barrelled shotgun, loaded with buckshot. The express messenger typically rode in a seat on top of the coach, on the left next to the driver, who typically sat on the right side, operating the wheel brake with his right arm. Such weapons were sometimes referred to as "messenger shotguns" ("coach gun" is a modern term, coined by gun collectors), which was an effective weapon for use against pursuing riders. If a stagecoach had only a driver and no messenger, this meant the coach carried no strongbox and was thus a less interesting target for "road agents" (bandits). To some extent, these weapons were also carried over to use by private guards in trains with strongboxes or safes, where they were also effective.

Like "gunslinger", the actual term "riding shotgun" first appeared in fiction about the Old West, dating back as far as the 1905 book The Sunset Trail by Alfred Henry Lewis. See also "calling shotgun" which dates from use in autos to about 1954, at a time when it was being used in the popular TV series Gunsmoke.

== See also ==
- Bob Paul, one of the most famous shotgun messengers of the American Old West
