= Alfred Henry Lewis =

American journalist

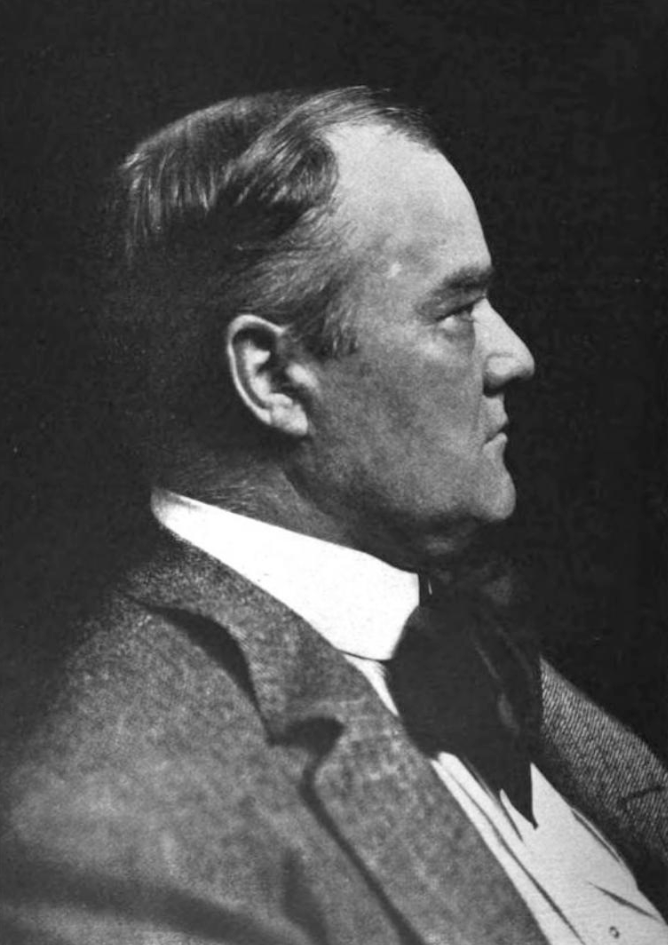
- Born: January 20, 1855; Cleveland, Ohio, US
- Died: December 23, 1914 (aged 59); Manhattan, New York, US
- Burial place: Woodlawn Cemetery
- Occupations: Journalist; writer; editor
- Known for: Investigative journalism; Wolfville books

Alfred Henry Lewis (January 20, 1855 – December 23, 1914) was an American investigative journalist, lawyer, novelist, editor, and short story writer, who sometimes published under the pseudonym Dan Quin.

== Career ==
Lewis began as a staff writer at the Chicago Times, and eventually became editor of the Chicago Times-Herald. By the late 19th century he was writing muckraker articles for Cosmopolitan. As an investigative journalist, Lewis wrote extensively about corruption in New York politics. In 1901 he published a biography of Richard Croker (1843–1922), a leading figure in the corrupt political machine known as Tammany Hall, which exercised a great deal of control over New York politics from the 1790s to the 1960s.

As a writer of genre fiction, his most successful works were Westerns from his Wolfville series, which he continued writing until he died of gastrointestinal disease at his home in Manhattan on December 23, 1914. He was buried at Woodlawn Cemetery in The Bronx.

== Bibliography ==
=== Non-fiction ===
- Richard Croker (1901)
- Nation-famous New York Murders (1914)

=== Novels and short story collections ===
- Wolfville: Episodes of Cowboy Life (1893)
- Sandburrs (1900)
- Wolfville Days (1902)
- Wolfville Nights (1902)
- The Black Lion Inn (1903)
- The Boss, and How He Came to Rule New York (1903)
- Peggy O'Neal (1903)
- The President (1904)
- The Sunset Trail (1905)
- Confessions of a Detective (1906)
- The Story of Paul Jones (1906)
- The Throwback (1906)
- When Men Grew Tall; or, The Story of Andrew Jackson (1907)
- An American Patrician; or, The Story of Aaron Burr (1908)
- Wolfville Folks (1908)
- The Apaches of New York (1912)
- Faro Nell and Her Friends: Wolfville Stories (1913)
