= Wyatt Earp in popular culture =

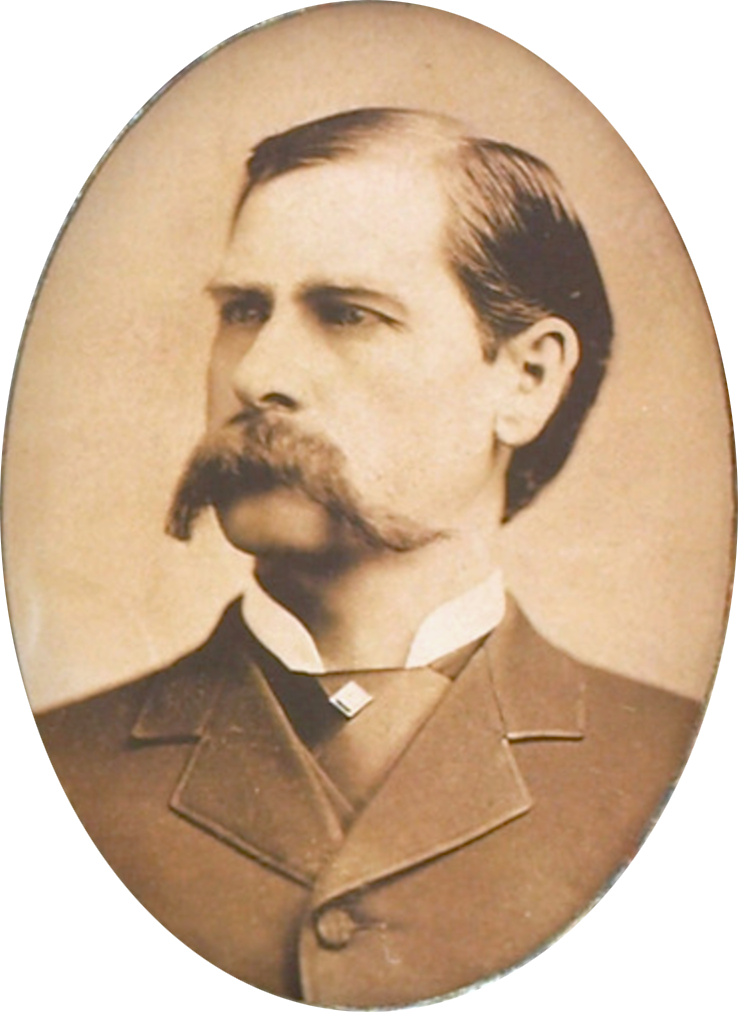
Earp at about age 39

Wyatt Earp (March 19, 1848 – January 13, 1929) was an American Old West lawman and gambler in Cochise County, Arizona Territory, and a deputy marshal in Tombstone, Arizona Territory.

When alive, he had a notorious reputation for both his handling of the Fitzsimmons vs. Sharkey fight and his role in the O.K. Corral gunfight. This only began to change after his death when the biography Wyatt Earp: Frontier Marshal was published in 1931. It became a bestseller and created his reputation as a fearless lawman. Since then, Earp has been the subject of numerous films, television shows, biographies, and works of fiction which have increased both his fame and his notoriety. Long after his death, he has many devoted detractors and admirers.

Earp's modern reputation suffered in the 1950s when his relationship with Celia Ann “Mattie” Blaylock, a known prostitute, was revealed. Josephine Sarah Marcus Earp had worked hard to conceal Wyatt's prior relationship to his common-law wife and former prostitute Blaylock, with whom Wyatt was living when Josephine first met him. His modern-day reputation is that of the Old West's toughest and deadliest gunman of his day.

When a post office was established in 1930 in the unincorporated settlement of Drennan, near the site of some of his mining claims, it was renamed Earp, California in his honor. In 2002, a plaque was erected at the site of the Earp's cottage in Vidal, California, noting that the cottage was the only home they owned in the time they were married.

== Earp in film and television ==
Earp was depicted in only one movie while he was alive. He later became the prototypical model for a western lawman. His character has been portrayed directly and indirectly in dozens of movies and television shows.

=== Wild Bill Hickok (1923) ===
Earp's good friend William Hart produced and wrote the seven-reel epic Wild Bill Hickok released by Paramount in 1923. It was the first movie to depict Wyatt Earp and the only movie that included his character before he died in 1929. Hart played "Wild Bill" and Bert Lindley played Earp. The role of Earp's character in the movie was very small. He appears at the back of a crowd scene when Hickok meets some gentlemen on the city street. Bert Lindley is not listed on some descriptions of the movie and this portrayal of Earp is often overlooked, as in the biography Inventing Wyatt Earp: His Life & Many Legends. Earp served as a technical adviser on the film.

In the film, Hickok calls on his friends Earp, Calamity Jane, Bat Masterson, Doc Holliday, Charlie Bassett, Luke Short and Bill Tilghman to help clean up a wild cowtown. Promotional copy for the film prominently mentioned Earp: "Back in the days when the West was young and wild, "Wild Bill" fought and loved and adventured with such famous frontiersmen as Bat Masterson and Wyatt Earp." Earp was described in the promotional copy as "Deputy Sheriff to Bat Masterson of Dodge City, known as one of the three greatest gun-men that ever lived, along with Bat Masterson and "Wild Bill" Hickok". In reality, Earp was a virtually unknown assistant marshal in Dodge City when Wild Bill Hickok was murdered in 1876.

After his death in 1929, Earp's character did not appear in a movie until the famous gunfight was depicted for the first time in the 1932 film Law and Order, although the Wyatt Earp character is named Frame 'Saint' Johnson (Walter Huston). Since then, about 40 other movies have included his character.

With the emergence of television in the 1950s, producers spun out a large number of Western-oriented shows. At the height of their popularity in 1959, there were more than two dozen "cowboy" programs on each week. At least six of them were connected in some extent to Wyatt Earp: The Life and Legend of Wyatt Earp, Bat Masterson, Tombstone Territory, Broken Arrow, Johnny Ringo, and Gunsmoke.

=== Depiction of Old West lawmen ===
Wyatt Earp both directly and indirectly influenced the way movies depict lawmen in the American Old West. While living in Los Angeles, Earp met several well-known and soon-to-be famous actors on the sets of various movies. He became good friends with Western actors William S. Hart, and Tom Mix. Stuart Lake's book Wyatt Earp: Frontier Marshal was the basis for how Earp has been depicted as a fearless Western hero in a large number of films and books. The book was first adapted into a movie for Frontier Marshal in 1934. Josephine Earp successfully pressured the producers to remove Wyatt's name from the film, and the protagonist was renamed "Michael Wyatt". The film was made again in 1939. Josephine sued 20th Century Fox for $50,000, but with the provision that Wyatt's name be removed from the title, and after she received $5,000, the movie was released as Frontier Marshal starring Randolph Scott playing Wyatt Earp. Sol M. Wurtzel produced both films.

Lake wrote another book about Wyatt Earp titled My Darling Clementine in 1946 that director John Ford developed into the movie of the same name, which further boosted Wyatt's reputation. The book later inspired a number of stories, movies and television programs about outlaws and lawmen in Dodge City and Tombstone. Lake wrote a number of screenplays for these movies and twelve scripts for the 1955–61 television series The Life and Legend of Wyatt Earp starring Hugh O'Brian as Earp.

The popular movie Gunfight at the O.K. Corral, released in 1957, starring Burt Lancaster as Earp, cemented his place in Western history as a hero lawman. The movie also altered the public's perception of cowboys, who in Earp's time and locale were outlaws, but in the movies were reinvented as good guys, assisting the lawmen in their fight against the outlaws.

Director John Ford said that when he was a prop boy in the early days of silent pictures, Earp would visit pals on the sets he knew from his Tombstone days. "I used to give him a chair and a cup of coffee, and he told me about the fight at the O.K. Corral. So in My Darling Clementine, we did it exactly the way it had been." When Ford was working on his last silent feature Hangman's House in 1928, which included the first credited screen appearances by John Wayne, Earp used to visit the set. John Wayne later told Hugh O'Brian that he based his Western lawman walk, talk and persona to his acquaintance with Wyatt Earp, who was good friends with Mix. "I knew him ... I often thought of Wyatt Earp when I played a film character. There's a guy that actually did what I'm trying to do." Wyatt Earp's character has been the central figure in 10 films and featured in many more. Among the best-known actors who have portrayed him are Randolph Scott, Guy Madison, Henry Fonda, Joel McCrea, Burt Lancaster, James Garner, Jimmy Stewart, Hugh O'Brian, Kurt Russell, Kevin Costner and Val Kilmer.

=== Notable films and television shows featuring Earp ===
- Wild Bill Hickok (1923) – Bert Lindley portrays Wyatt Earp.
- Frontier Marshal (1934) – Notable as the first film adaptation of Stuart N. Lake's novel. George O'Brien plays "Michael Wyatt", directed by Lewis Seiler.
- Frontier Marshal (1939) – Starring Randolph Scott, directed by Allan Dwan.
- Tombstone, the Town Too Tough to Die (1942) – Starring Richard Dix, directed by William C. McGann.
- My Darling Clementine (1946) – Starring Henry Fonda, directed by John Ford.
- Wichita (1955) – Starring Joel McCrea; directed by Jacques Tourneur.
- The Life and Legend of Wyatt Earp TV series (1955–1961) – Starring Hugh O'Brian as Wyatt Earp.
- Gunfight at the O.K. Corral (1957) – Starring Burt Lancaster, directed by John Sturges.
- Hour of the Gun (1967) – Starring James Garner, directed by John Sturges.
- Doc (1971) – Harris Yulin as Wyatt and Stacy Keach as Doc; directed by Frank Perry.
- Tombstone (1993) – Starring Kurt Russell, directed by George P. Cosmatos.
- Wyatt Earp (1994) – Starring Kevin Costner, directed by Lawrence Kasdan.
- Wyatt Earp's Revenge (2012) – Starring Val Kilmer.
- Tombstone Rashomon (2017) – Starring Adam Newberry.

=== Adaptation of the Earp character ===
- Law and Order (1932) – Walter Huston as Frame Johnson, inspired by Wyatt Earp.
- The Arizonian (1935) – Richard Dix as Clay Tallant, inspired by Wyatt Earp.
- Dodge City (1939) – Errol Flynn as Wade Hatton, inspired by Wyatt Earp.
- Sheriff of Tombstone (1941) – Roy Rogers as Brett Starr, inspired by Wyatt Earp.
- Winchester '73 (1950) – James Stewart wins a rare Winchester rifle that is stolen. Will Geer as Wyatt Earp.
- Law and Order (1953) – Ronald Reagan as Frame Johnson, inspired by Wyatt Earp.
- Powder River (1953) – Rory Calhoun as Chino Bullock, inspired by Wyatt Earp.
- Gun Belt (1953) – Outlaw Billy Ringo tries to go straight. James Millican as Wyatt Earp.
- Masterson of Kansas (1954) – Bat Masterson is assisted by Wyatt Earp and Doc Holliday.
- Badman's Country (1958) – Pat Garrett catches up to Butch Cassidy's gang and calls in Wyatt Earp.
- Alias Jesse James (1959) – Bob Hope stars and Hugh O'Brian briefly appears as Wyatt Earp.
- Warlock (1959) with Henry Fonda, who had played Earp by name in My Darling Clementine; he plays a fictionalized version named Clay Blaisdell in this film.
- The Secret World of Eddie Hodges (1960) – TV musical starring Jackie Gleason and Hugh O'Brian as Wyatt Earp.
- Cheyenne Autumn (1964) James Stewart as Wyatt Earp and Arthur Kennedy as Doc Holliday.
- Gunmen of the Rio Grande (1965) – Guy Madison as Wyatt Earp.
- Wagon Train - episode "The Silver Lady" (1965) – Don Collier as Wyatt Earp.
- "The Gunfighters" (1966), an episode of Doctor Who – The TARDIS materializes in Tombstone prior to the gunfight. John Alderson played Wyatt Earp.
- "Spectre of the Gun" (1968), an episode of Star Trek – Officers of the USS Enterprise are cast as the Cowboys. Ron Soble plays Wyatt Earp.
- "Which Way to the O.K. Corral?" (1972), an episode of Alias Smith and Jones – Cameron Mitchell as Wyatt Earp and Bill Fletcher plays Doc Holliday.
- I Married Wyatt Earp (1983) – Based on the supposed memoir. Marie Osmond as Josephine Earp.
- Sunset (1988) – James Garner as Wyatt Earp.
- The Young Indiana Jones Chronicles (1994) – Leo Gordon as Wyatt Earp.
- Deadwood (2006) – Gale Harold as Wyatt Earp.
- Hannah's Law (2012) – Greyston Holt as Wyatt Earp.
- The Ridiculous 6 (2015) – Blake Shelton as Wyatt Earp.
- Wynonna Earp (2016) – Ryan Northcott as Wyatt Earp and Tim Rozon as Doc Holliday.
- The American West (2016) - Johnathan C. Stewart as Wyatt Earp.

== Property auction ==
=== John Gilchriese collection ===
John Gilchriese, an amateur historian and long-time collector of Earp memorabilia, interviewed John H. Flood Jr., Wyatt Earp's secretary, several times before his death in 1959. Gilchriese operated a Wyatt Earp Museum from 1966 to 1973 at Fifth and Toughnut Streets in Tombstone. His collection included Earp's original diagrams of the gunfights in Tombstone and Iron Springs, along with photos, original letters, invoices, checks, and hundreds of related items. In 2004, when his health deteriorated, he sold his collection at auction. The drawings of the OK Corral shoot out were later resold.

=== Signature ===
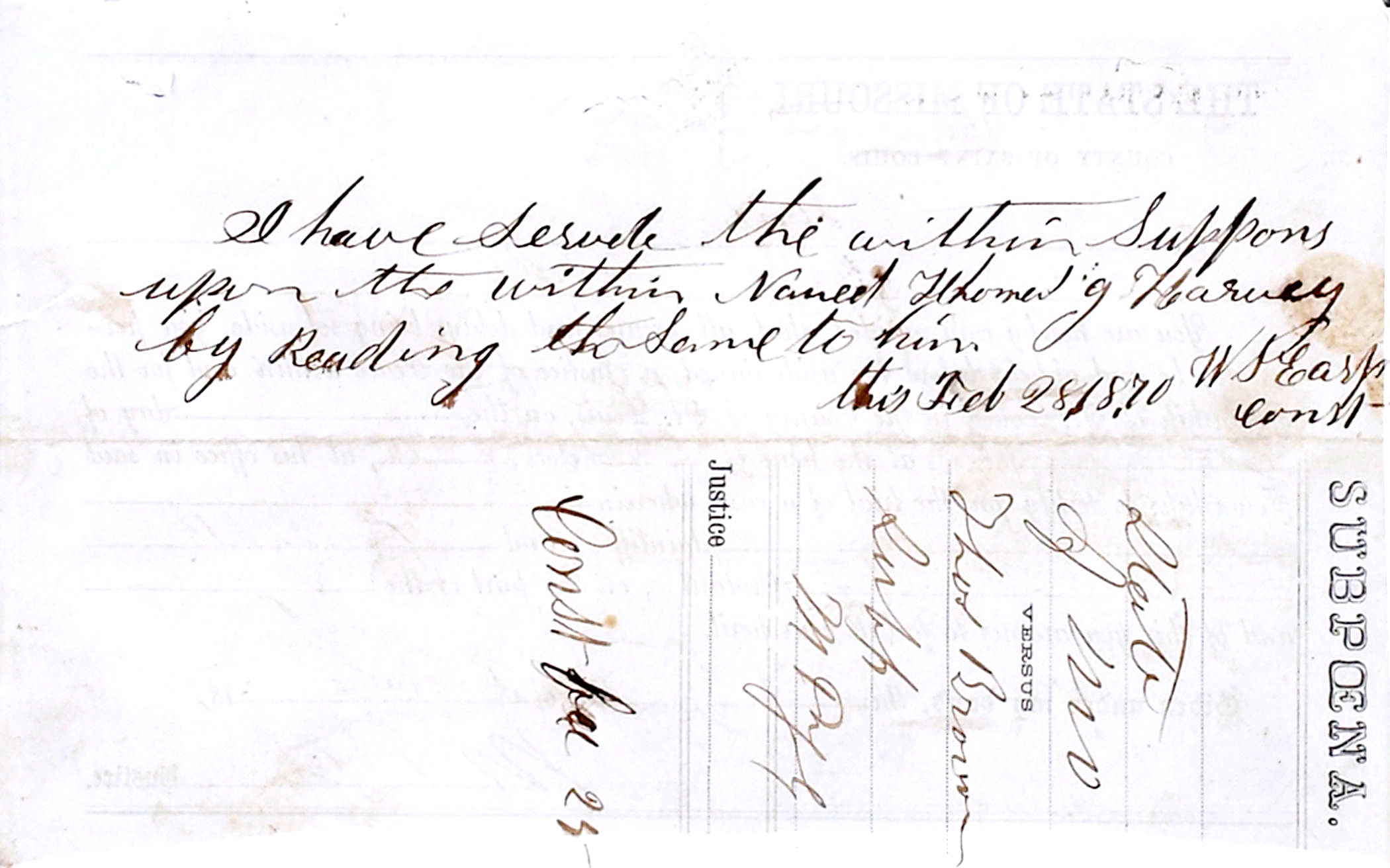
Lamar, Missouri, subpoena signed by Constable Wyatt Earp, February 28, 1870.

In February, 2010, the earliest known example of Wyatt Earp's signature, found on a February, 1870 Lamar, Missouri subpoena, sold at auction for $14,937.50.

=== Weapons ===
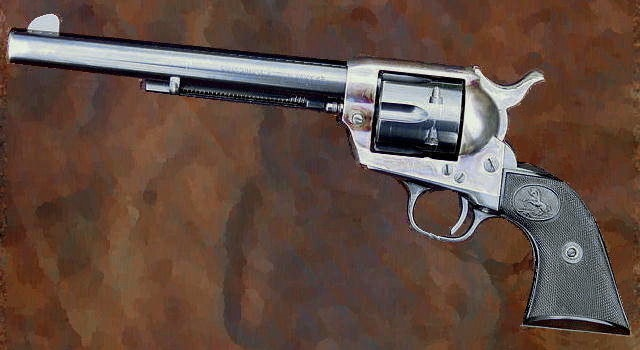
Colt .45 single-action revolver like that owned by Wyatt Earp.

On April 17, 2014, the family of deceased Earp amateur historian Glenn Boyer put much of his Earp collection and many artifacts up for auction. Among the 32 boxes of documentation, files, pictures and memorabilia for sale was a Colt .45 caliber said by Earp descendants to have been owned by Wyatt Earp. Also included in the auction was a Winchester lever-action shotgun belonging to Wyatt Earp.

Earp was known to carry a .45 caliber revolver, as he did on the night of the Fitzimmons-Sharkey fight in 1896. Historians have credible evidence that Wyatt used a .44 caliber 1869 American model Smith & Wesson during the gunfight at the O.K. Corral. This weapon was given by Earp to John Flood, who left it to Earp historian John D. Gilchriese.

Descendants of Wyatt Earp's cousins assert that Earp carried the revolver featured in the auction and while in Tombstone, although the grips, barrel, and cylinder have been replaced. Only the frame is original, and its serial number has been filed off. However, X-ray testing showed an original serial number, 5686, which matches a batch of revolvers purchased by the U.S. Army in 1874.

The history of the items is controversial, because they belonged to Boyer. John Boessenecker, a respected author of numerous articles on the American Old West and a collector of American Old West guns and memorabilia, said that it would be "impossible to separate the authenticity of the auction items from Boyer's own troubled history." This is particularly true, because the provenance of the weapons is based on letters written by or given to Boyer. The authenticity of the revolver displayed at the auction is attested to by a typewritten letter dictated by Bill Miller to his daughter LaVonne Griffin. Miller was married to Estelle Edwards, the daughter of Adelia Earp Edwards, Wyatt's sister. Before his death, Boyer completed a sworn affidavit attesting that the Colt .45 belonged to Earp. The affidavit is included with the revolver, along with other expert findings. Critics challenge the authenticity of the letter because Boyer signed an affidavit in 1994 and stated again in 1999, long after Bill Miller's death, that he did not have any documentation from Miller. LeRoy Merz, the owner of Merz Antique Firearms, is the nation's largest dealer in antique Winchesters in the United States. Despite Boyer's affidavit, he said the missing serial number is a "kiss of death." He says, "No serious collector will want that."

The Wyatt revolver from Boyer's estate was expected to fetch from $100,000 and $150,000. On the day of the auction, more than 6,400 online bidders and over 400 collectors from 49 countries took part in the auction. The revolver attributed to Wyatt Earp was sold to John Anderson, a founder of Isagenix International in Chandler, Arizona, for $225,000. The Winchester lever-action shotgun also said to be Wyatt Earp's sold for $50,000, below the high value estimate of $125,000.

Before leaving Tombstone, Earp borrowed a short, 22-inch, 10 gauge, double barrel Spencer percussion shotgun from Fred Dodge, which he used to kill Curly Bill Brocius. Dodge used the shotgun throughout his 40-year career. The gun was later registered to U.S. Marshal Heck Thomas, who in 1896 used the gun to kill outlaw Bill Doolin, a member of the Dalton Gang. It has since passed through several owners, and was last sold in February, 2020, for $375,000.00.

=== Gunfight sketch ===
John H. Flood Jr., Wyatt Earp's secretary, who he regarded like a son, drew a sketch of the gunfight at the O.K. Corral in 1926 under Wyatt's supervision. The drawing placed participants and selected witnesses on Fremont Street in Tombstone, and Earp annotated it with lines indicating how the participants moved during the 30-second shootout. It was sold at auction by Alexander Autographs in early October 2010, for $380,000.

== Ship Wyatt Earp ==
Arctic explorer Lincoln Ellsworth became fascinated with the Earp legend. Ellsworth completed four expeditions to Antarctica between 1933 and 1939, using a former Norwegian herring boat as his aircraft transporter and base that he named Wyatt Earp after his hero.

Ellsworth befriended Earp's widow, Josephine Earp. After Wyatt's death, she wrote him that she was sending him Wyatt's handgun, a shotgun, pipe, and wedding ring. She said she was sending him a .41-caliber Colt revolver, which she said Wyatt referred to affectionately as his "baby pony." However, Ellsworth actually received a .45-caliber Colt revolver with a 7 ½" barrel. Its serial number indicates it was originally shipped from the Colt factory on January 30, 1883. The shotgun was a 16 gauge double-barreled hunting shotgun and case belonging to Wyatt. Ellsworth's widow Mary Louise Ellsworth donated the wedding ring and pistol to the Arizona Historical Society in 1988.

== Other references ==
Crime novelist Robert B. Parker wrote a dramatization of Wyatt Earp's life entitled Gunman's Rhapsody in 2001.

In Fast Five, Roman Pearce mentions Wyatt Earp. He says "the job is hard enough without having Wyatt Earp on us" after finding out that the Diplomatic Security Service wanted to arrest them.

Wyatt and Morgan Earp figure prominently in Michael Crichton's novel Dragon Teeth published posthumously in 2017.

In Mortal Kombat 11, an interaction between Geras and Erron Black reveals that the former was shot by Wyatt Earp.

In Starfield, Wyatt Earp, or at least a man who claims to be Wyatt Earp, is the town sheriff and trader of The Crucible in the Charybdis Star System.

Wyatt Earp appears as a character in the Jim Butcher short story "A Fistful of Warlocks," a story set in the universe of The Dresden Files and published in the 2017 Weird West anthology "Straight Outta Tombstone."

In Modern Family Season Five, Episode 22 "Message Received," Cameron Tucker tries to pawn what he believes to be Wyatt Earp's belt buckle to help pay for his wedding. His partner Mitchell Pritchett discovers that it was a cheap gas station replica from the 1960s.
