= Wyatt Earp's fame and reputation =

Reputation of American folk legend Wyatt Earp

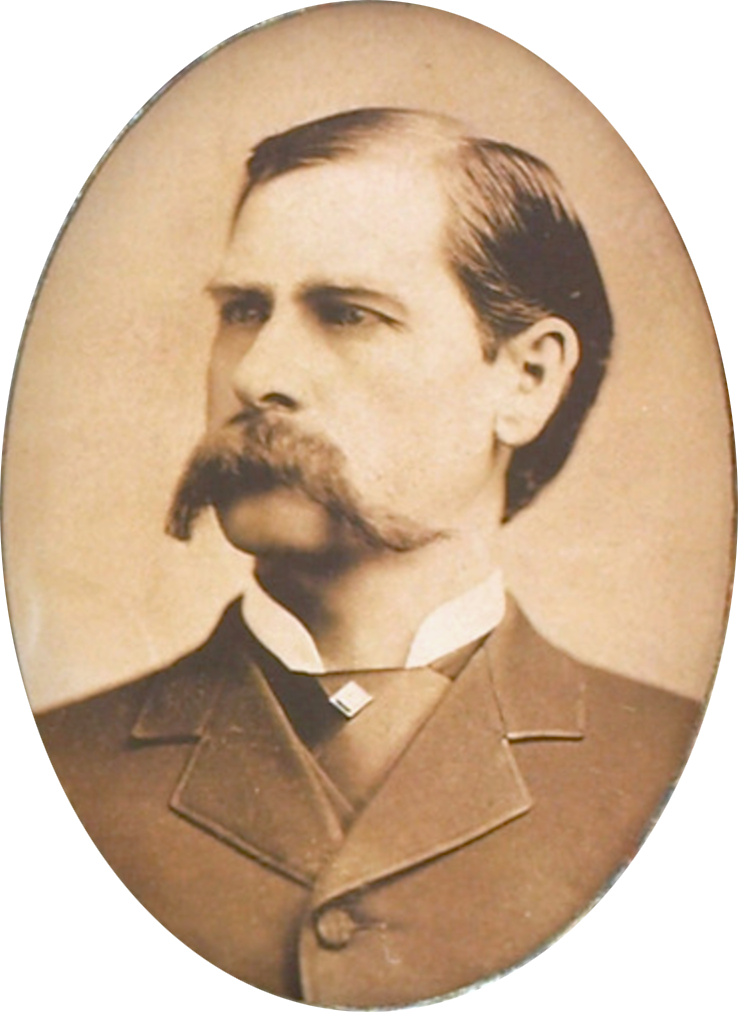
Earp at about age 39

Wyatt Earp's fame and reputation has varied through the years. While alive, he had many admirers and detractors. Among his peers near the time of his death, Wyatt Earp was respected. His deputy Jimmy Cairns described Earp's work as a police officer in Wichita, Kansas: "Wyatt Earp was a wonderful officer. He was game to the last ditch and apparently afraid of nothing. The cowmen all respected him and seemed to recognize his superiority and authority at such times as he had to use it." He described Wyatt as "...the most dependable man I ever knew; a quiet, unassuming chap who never drank and in all respects a clean young fellow..."

Among the general public, Earp was likely more well known for the controversy that engulfed him after the Fitzsimmons vs. Sharkey match in San Francisco than for the gunfight in Tombstone. His Associated Press obituary gave prominent attention to his officiating of the boxing match, while describing him as a "gun-fighter whose blazing six-shooters were, for most of his life, allied with the side of law and order". Public perception of his life has varied as media accounts of his life have evolved.

After the shootout in Tombstone, his pursuit and murder of those who attacked his brothers, and after his leaving Arizona, Wyatt was often the target of negative newspaper stories that disparaged his and his brothers' reputation. His role in history has stimulated considerable ongoing scholarly and editorial debate. A large body of literature has been written about Wyatt Earp and his legacy, some of it highly fictionalized. Considerable portions of it are either full of admiration and flattery or hostile debunking.

== Contemporary reputation ==
Public perception of his life has varied over the years as media accounts of his life changed. The story of the Earps' actions in Tombstone were published at the time by newspapers nationwide. Shortly after the shooting of Curly Bill, the Tucson Star wrote on March 21, 1882, in an editorial about the O.K. Corral gunfight, that the Cowboys had been ordered to put their hands up and after they complied, were shot by the Earps, stating, "The whole series of killings cannot be classed other than cold blooded murder."

When citizens of Dodge City learned the Earps had been charged with murder after the gunfight, they sent letters endorsing and supporting the Earps to Judge Wells Spicer.

John Clum, owner of The Tombstone Epitaph and mayor of Tombstone while Earp was a gambler and lawman there, described him in his book It All Happened in Tombstone.

Wyatt's manner, though friendly, suggested a quiet reserve ... Frequently it has happened that men who have served as peace officers on the frontier have craved notoriety in connection with their dealings with the outlaw element of their time. Wyatt Earp deprecated such notoriety, and during his last illness he told me that for many years he had hoped the public would weary of the narratives – distorted with fantastic and fictitious embellishments – that were published from time to time concerning him, and that his last years might be passed in undisturbed obscurity.

Bill Dixon knew Wyatt early in his adult life. He wrote:

Wyatt was a shy young man with few intimates. With casual acquaintances he seldom spoke unless spoken to. When he did say anything it was to the point, without fear or favor, which wasn't relished by some; but that never bothered Wyatt. To those who knew him well he was a genial companion. He had the most even disposition I ever saw; I never knew him to lose his temper. He was more intelligent, better educated, and far better mannered than the majority of his associates, which probably did not help them to understand him. His reserve limited his friendships, but more than one stranger, down on his luck, has had firsthand evidence of Wyatt's generosity. I think his outstanding quality was the nicety with which he gauged the time and effort for every move. That, plus his absolute confidence in himself, gave him the edge over the run of men.

Famous lawman Bat Masterson described Wyatt in 1907:

Wyatt Earp was one of the few men I personally knew in the West in the early days whom I regarded as absolutely destitute of physical fear. I have often remarked, and I am not alone in my conclusions, that what goes for courage in a man is generally fear of what others will think of him – in other words, personal bravery is largely made up of self-respect, egotism, and apprehension of the opinions of others. Wyatt Earp's daring and apparent recklessness in time of danger is wholly characteristic; personal fear doesn't enter into the equation, and when everything is said and done, I believe he values his own opinion of himself more than that of others, and it is his own good report he seeks to preserve ... He never at any time in his career resorted to the pistol excepting cases where such a course was absolutely necessary. Wyatt could scrap with his fists, and had often taken all the fight out of bad men, as they were called, with no other weapons than those provided by nature.

=== Experience in gun fights ===
Wyatt was reputed to be an expert with a revolver. He showed no fear of any man. The Tombstone Epitaph said of Wyatt, "Bravery and determination were requisites, and in every instance proved himself the right man in the right place."

Wyatt was lucky during the few gun fights he took part in from his earliest job as an assistant police officer in Wichita to Tombstone, where he was briefly deputy U.S. marshal. Unlike his lawmen brothers Virgil and James, Wyatt was never wounded, although once his clothing and his saddle were shot through with bullet holes. According to John H. Flood's biography (as dictated to him by Wyatt Earp), Wyatt vividly recalled a presence that in several instances warned him away or urged him to take action. This happened when he was on the street, alone in his room at the Cosmopolitan Hotel, at Bob Hatch's Pool Hall, where he went moments before Morgan was assassinated, and again when he approached Iron Springs and surprised Curly Bill Brocius, killing him.

=== Negative publicity ===
On April 16, 1894, the Fort Worth Gazette wrote that Virgil Earp and John Behan had a "deadly feud". It described Behan as "an honest man, a good official, and possessed many of the attributes of a gentleman". Earp, on the other hand, "was head of band of desperadoes, a partner in stage robbers, and a friend of gamblers and professional killers ... Wyatt was the boss killer of the region."

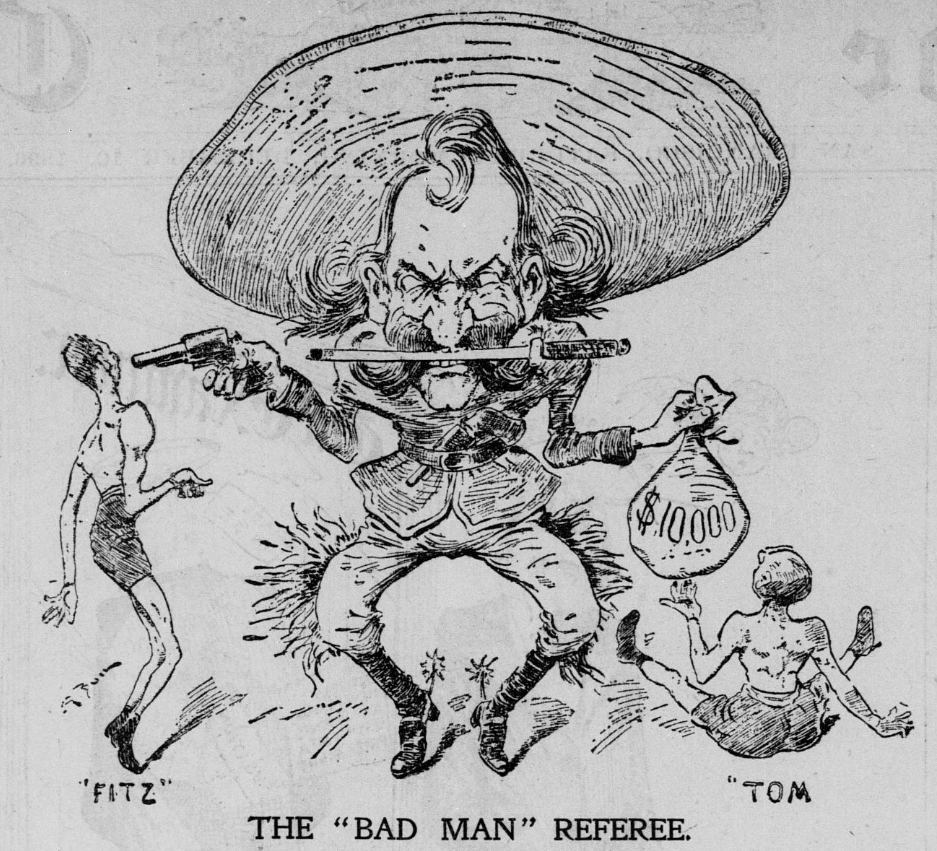
A caricature of Earp from The New York Herald mocking him after the Sharkey-Fitzimmons fight. The image dogged him the rest of his life.

Former nemesis Johnny Behan continued to spread rumors about the Earps for the next twenty years. On December 7, 1897, he was quoted in a story in the Washington Post, reprinted by the San Francisco Call, describing the Earp's lawbreaking behavior in Tombstone. After referring to the Fitzimmons-Sharkey fight, the article quoted Behan: "The Clanton brothers and the McLowrys were a tough lot of rustlers who were the main perpetrators of the rascally rife in that region. Between them and Earps rose a bitter feud over the division of the proceeds of the looting. The Earp boys believed they had failed to get a fair divide of the booty and swore vengeance. They caught their former allies in Tombstone unarmed and shot three of them dead while their hands were uplifted." Behan went on to say, "They were hauled up before a Justice of the Peace ... Warrants were issued for their arrest, and, summoning a posse, I went out to bring the Earps in. They were chased entirely out of the county and Tombstone knew them no more." Earp was parodied in editorial caricatures by newspapers across the country. Behan lambasted the Earps as the bad men who had attacked the cowboys until he died in 1912.

Four days after the fight in San Francisco, Alfred H. Lewis in the New York Journal claimed to have been a neighbor of the Earps in Tombstone. He mangled basic facts including family members' names. He wrote that Ike Clanton had married Earp's sister "Jessie" and that Wyatt had killed his own brother in law. He claimed they "were famed in Tombstone and in the Cochise country round about as qualified to pull and make a center shot in less than one-tenth of a second." They "were prone to 'fanning' their pistols in a fight, whereby a Colt six-shooter becomes for the nonce a miniature Gatling." According to Lewis, Virgil and Wyatt formed a faction of stage robbers "who stood up stages and plundered express companies for a livelihood ... After a robbery, the Earps made further money, enlisting themselves with a posse comitatus and chasing themselves." The story was re-run by multiple newspapers across the United States.

After Earp left Alaska in 1901, the New York Sun printed a story in 1903 that described a confrontation Earp had reportedly had with a short 5-foot Cockney Canadian Mountie, who embarrassed Earp by demanding that he leave his weapon in his room. The story was reprinted as far away as New Zealand by the Otago Witness. The Dawson Record commented on the story, mocking the newspaper as a "venerable dispenser of truth".

On Oct 29, 1905, the Bisbee Daily Review reported on Virgil Earp's death: "Virgil Earp, who belonged to the noted Earp gang which was a terror to the peaceable citizens of Tombstone ... was considered the most dangerous man of the Earp gang and was a dead shot with a revolver or rifle."

On April 13, 1921, the Arizona Republican ran a lengthy interview with Thomas Raines, a former resident of Tombstone. Raines described the gunfight as an ambush. He said that he remembered the Earps shot the Cowboys and killed Ike Clanton (when they actually killed his brother Billy) before the Cowboys had a chance to surrender. He recalled that the Cowboys "were leading their horses out of the gate when they were confronted, almost from ambush, by four of the Earps: Virgil, Wyatt, Morgan and Jim, and by Doc Holliday. Virgil Earp, armed with a sawed-off express shotgun, and accompanying his demand with profanity, yelled "Hands up!" But he didn't wait for the action demanded and shot almost as soon as he spoke. Tom McLowery [sic] showed his empty bands, and cried. 'Gentlemen, I am unarmed.' Holliday answered with the discharge of his shotgun. Ike Clanton fell at the first fire, mortally wounded, but he rolled over and fired two shots from his pistol between his bent knees."

During 1922 Frederick R. Bechdolt published the book When the West Was Young, which included a story about Wyatt's time in Tombstone, but he mangled many basic facts. He described the Earp-Clanton differences as the falling-out of partners in crime.

On March 12, 1922, the Sunday Los Angeles Times ran a short, scandalous article titled "Lurid Trails Are Left by Olden-Day Bandits" by J.M. Scanland. It described Wyatt and his brothers as a gang, comparable to the Dalton Gang, who waylaid the cowboys in the shoot-out at the O.K. Corral. It said that the Earps were allies of Frank Stilwell, who had informed on them, so they killed him, and that Earp had died in Colton, California.

The author concocted a fictional description of the Earp's relationship with Sheriff Behan and the Cowboys:

Trouble arose between them and Sheriff John Behan, who tried to 'clean up' the town. Trouble began when four cowboys refused to recognize the right of the Earp gang to rule the town. The cowboys were Bill and Ike Clanton and Tom and Frank McLowry. The Earps ordered the cowboys out of town and they were preparing to leave when they were waylaid and a gun battle followed during which Virgil Earp was shot in the leg, Morgan Earp in the shoulder and Ike Clanton was killed. The town was aroused and Frank Stilwell, who led the stage robberies, brought the trouble to a climax when he informed against his partners, because the Earps would not divide fairly. In a gun battle that followed, Stilwell killed Morgan Earp. A few months later another stage was robbed, and the driver, 'Bud' Philpot, was killed.

Josephine and Earps' friend and actor William Hart both wrote letters to the publisher. Josephine demanded that the error "must be corrected and printed in the same sensational manner" given to the correction as to the original article, which the paper published.

=== Reputation at death ===
Wyatt was repeatedly criticized in the media over the remainder of his life. His wife Josephine wrote, "The falsehoods that were printed in some of the newspapers about him and the unjust accusations against him hurt Wyatt more deeply than anything that ever happened to him during my life with him, with the exception of his mother's death and that of his father and brother, Warren."

At the time of his death, Earp may have been more well known for the controversy that engulfed him after the Fitzsimmons vs. Sharkey match in San Francisco than for the gunfight in Tombstone. His Associated Press obituary gave prominent attention to his officiating of the Fitzsimmons-Sharkey fight, while describing him as a "gun-fighter whose blazing six-shooters were, for most of his life, allied with the side of law and order".

In its January 14, 1929, obituary, the Los Angeles Times wrote a fictional account of Earp's taming Colton, California:

As Deputy United States Marshal, Earp had been sent from town to town to quell disturbances and establish peace. His only recorded visit to California in those days was his memorable trip to Colton, then known as the "toughest town untamed". Within a week Wyatt Earp had the town running like a clock, but at the cost of not a few lives of "prominent citizens". Earp could shoot with his two guns from all angles and instantly made his presence felt in Colton.

== Modern reputation ==
Long after his death, Earp has many remained a controversial figure, with both critics and admirers. In popular culture and some historical accounts, he has been portrayed as one of the most formidable gunfighters of the Old West.

=== Walter Noble Burns ===
Author Walter Noble Burns visited Earp in September 1926 and asked him questions with the intent to write a book about Earp. Earp declined because he was already collaborating with John Flood. Burns visited Tombstone and based on what he learned decided instead to focus his book on Doc Holliday. He pestered Earp for facts, and on March 27 the next year, Earp finally responded to Burns' repeated requests in an 11-page letter outlining the basic facts from Earp's point of view.

When their efforts to get the Flood manuscript published failed, the Earps decided to appeal to Burns, whose own book was near publication. But he was not interested. His book was about to be published, free of the constraints imposed by a collaboration with Earp. Burns wrote them, "I should not now care to undertake another book which, in part at least, would be upon much the same lines ... I should have been delighted six months ago to accept your offer but it is too late now. My book has championed Mr. Earp's cause throughout and I believe will vindicate his reputation in Tombstone in a way that he will like." When Burns turned them down, Josephine actively worked to stop the publication of his book, fearful that their efforts to publish Wyatt's biography would be thwarted as a result.

In late 1927 Burns published Tombstone, An Iliad of the Southwest, a mesmerizing tale "of blood and thunder" that christened Earp as the "Lion of Tombstone". "Strong, bold, forceful, picturesque was the fighter of the old frontier. Something epic in him, fashioned in Homeric mold. In his way, a hero." It included a good deal about Wyatt, to Wyatt and Josie's displeasure. Readers and reviewers had difficulty discerning between "fact and fiction". The book is the first to have popularized its subject for a mass reading audience. Burns treated Earp as a mythical figure, a "larger-than-life hero whose many portrayals in film, television, and books often render fidelity to truth the first casualty".

=== Billy Breakenridge ===
While living in Vidal, Wyatt and Josie were visited by Billy Breakenridge, the former Tombstone deputy under John Behan. He pressed Wyatt for details about his time in Tombstone to add to his book Helldorado: Bringing Law to the Mesquite. Breakenridge was assisted by Western novelist William MacLeod Raine, who since 1904 had published more than 25 novels about Western history. The book was published in 1928 before Wyatt died. It depicted Wyatt as a thief, pimp, crooked gambler, and murderer. Breakenridge wrote that the Earps and Doc Holliday aggressively mistreated the guiltless Cowboys until they were forced into a fatal confrontation. His description of the 1881 O.K. Corral gun fight stated that the Clanton and McLaury brothers were merely Cowboys who had been unarmed and surrendered but the Earp brothers had shot them in cold blood. Wyatt and Josie protested that the book's contents were biased and more fiction than fact. Earp complained about the book until his death in 1929, and his wife continued in the same vein afterward.

=== Edwin Burkholder ===
Edwin V. Burkholder, who specialized in stories about the Old West, published an article about Wyatt in 1955 in Argosy Magazine. He called Wyatt Earp a coward and murderer, and manufactured evidence to support his allegations. He also wrote, using the pseudonyms "George Carleton Mays" and "J. S. Qualey", for the Western magazine Real West. His stores were filled with sensational claims about Wyatt Earp's villainy, and he made up fake letters to the editor from supposed "old-timers" to corroborate this story.

=== Frank Waters ===
Frank Waters interviewed Virgil Earp's widow, Allie Sullivan Earp, to write The Earp Brothers of Tombstone. Allie Earp was so upset by the way Waters distorted and manipulated her words that she threatened to shoot him. His writing was so contentious and disputed that he waited until 13 years after her death to publish the book. In it, Waters vociferously berated Wyatt:

Wyatt was an itinerant saloonkeeper, cardsharp, gunman, bigamist, church deacon, policeman, bunco artist, and a supreme confidence man. A lifelong exhibitionist ridiculed alike by members of his own family, neighbors, contemporaries, and the public press, he lived his last years in poverty, still vainly trying to find someone to publicize his life, and died two years before his fictitious biography recast him in the role of America's most famous frontier marshal.

Purportedly quoting Allie, he invented bitter public fights between Mattie and Wyatt, and told how Wyatt's affair with Sadie Marcus, "the slut of Tombstone", had humiliated Mattie. He condemned the Earp brothers' character and called them names.

Waters used Allie Earp's anecdotes as a frame for adding a narrative and "building a case, essentially piling quote upon quote to prove that Wyatt Earp was a con man, thief, robber, and eventually murderer". The book "further embroidered upon Frank Waters's imaginings about Wyatt's adulterous affair" with Josephine. It was described by one reviewer as "a smear campaign levied against the Earp brothers". Years later, he wrote a letter to the Arizona Historical Society in which he admitted that he had combined Allie's words to create a "cold, objective analysis" and "expose" of the whole subject.

S. J. Reidhead, author of Travesty: Frank Waters Earp Agenda Exposed, spent nearly a decade searching for Water's original manuscript, researching him, his background, and his bias against the Earps. In doing so the author discovered that the story Waters presented against the Earps was primarily fictitious. "Nothing is documented," she wrote. "There are no notes nor sourcing. There is only the original Tombstone Travesty manuscript and the final Earp Brothers of Tombstone. Because of his later reputation, few writers, even today, dare question Waters's motives. They also do not bother fact checking the Earp Brothers of Tombstone, which is so inaccurate it should be considered fiction, rather than fact."

Writers and researchers opposing Earp use Frank Waters's Earp Brothers of Tombstone as their primary source for material that presents Wyatt Earp as something of a villainous monster, aided and abetted by his brothers who were almost brutes. Waters detested the Earps so badly that he presented a book that was terribly flawed, poorly edited, and brimming with prevarications. In his other work Waters is poetic. In the Earp Brothers of Tombstone he is little more than a tabloid hack, trying to slander someone he dislikes. To date, no reason has been uncovered for the bias Frank Waters exhibited against Wyatt Earp and his brothers.

=== Ed Bartholomew ===
In 1963 Ed Bartholomew published Wyatt Earp, The Untold Story followed by Wyatt Earp: Man and Myth in 1964. His books were strongly anti-Earp and attacked Wyatt Earp's image as a hero. Bartholomew went about this by reciting snippets of accumulated anti-Earp facts, rumors, gossip, and innuendo. Bartholomew's books started a trend of debunking Earp, and the academic community followed his lead, pursuing the image of Earp as a "fighting pimp".

=== Allen Barra ===
In reviewing Allen Barra's Inventing Wyatt Earp. His Life and Many Legends, William Urban, a professor of history at Monmouth College in Warren County, Illinois, pointed out a number of factual inaccuracies in the book. One inconsistency by Barra, pointed out by another reviewer, includes a description of the poker game the night before the shootout. Ike Clanton's account of the game (the only one that exists) gives the participants as John Behan, Virgil Earp, Ike Clanton, Tom McLaury, and a fifth man Ike did not recognize, while Barra wrote that Holliday had attended the game.

== Fame ==
Earp was dismayed about the controversy that continually followed him.

He wrote a letter to John Hays Hammond on May 21, 1925, telling him "notoriety had been the bane of my life. I detest it, and I never have put forth any effort to check the tales that have been published in which my brothers and I are supposed to have been the principal participants. Not one of them is correct."

The 1922 scandalous story in the Sunday Los Angeles Times by Scanland annoyed Earp. He was tired of all the lies perpetuated about him and became determined to get his story accurately told. Still, in 1924, a story in a San Francisco paper said that interviewing him was "like pulling teeth". Earp did not trust the press and preferred to keep his mouth shut.

The many negative, untruthful stories bothered Earp a great deal, and he finally decided to tell his own story. Earp also tried to find J. M. Scanland, the author of the LA Times article, and extract a written retraction from him, which he finally did in 1927.

In 1925 Earp began to collaborate on a biography with his friend and former mining engineer John Flood to get his story told in a way that he approved.

=== Lake's biography ===
Unlike most legendary lawmen of the American West, Earp was relatively unknown until Stuart N. Lake published the first biography of Wyatt Earp, Wyatt Earp: Frontier Marshal in 1931, two years after Earp died. Lake portrayed Earp as a "Western superhero" who single-handedly cleaned up a town full of Cowboy criminals. In fact, Earp had been a stagecoach guard for Wells Fargo, a full-time gambler, a regular associate of prostitutes, and, occasionally, a lawman.

Lake wrote the book with Earp's input, but was only able to interview him eight times before Earp died, during which Earp sketched out the "barest facts" of his life. With very little information from Earp, Lake wrote the biography in the first person.

Lake initially sought Earp out hoping to write a magazine article about him. Earp was also seeking a biographer at about the same time. Aged 80 years, Earp was concerned that his vantage point on the Tombstone story may be lost, and may have been financially motivated, as he had little income in his last years.

During the interviews and in later correspondence, Josephine and Wyatt went to great lengths to keep her name out of Lake's book. Lake wrote Earp that he planned to send portions of the book to his New York agent, but Earp objected because he wanted to read it first. After Earp's death on January 13, 1929, Josephine continued to try to persuade Lake to leave her and Earp's former wife, Mattie Blaylock, out of the book, even threatening legal action. Lake finally published Wyatt Earp: Frontier Marshal in 1931, two years after Earp's death.

Lake's creative biography portrays Earp as a "Western superhero", "gallant white knight", and entirely avoided mentioning Josephine Earp or Blaylock. A number of Hollywood movies have been directly and indirectly influenced by Lake's book and its depiction of Earp's role as a western lawman. The book drew considerable positive attention and established Lake as a western screenwriter for years to come. It also established the gunfight at the O.K. Corral in the public consciousness and Earp as a fearless lawman in the American Old West.

The book "is now regarded more as fiction than fact", and "an imaginative hoax, a fabrication mixed with just enough fact to give it credibility".

=== Reputation as a teetotaler ===
Josephine Earp worked hard to create an image of Wyatt as a teetotaler, but as a saloon owner and gambler, he drank occasionally. When Flood and Lake wrote their biographies, Prohibition was in force. Among the facts Josephine wanted scrubbed from Earp's history, was that he liked a drink. She persuaded biographers Flood, Lake, and Burns to write that Earp was a non-drinker. A good friend of Earp's, Charlie Welsh, was known to disappear for days at a time "to see property", the family euphemism for a drinking binge, and Earp was his regular partner. Director John Ford said that whenever Josephine left town for religious conventions, Earp would come into town, play poker, and get drunk with the cowboy actors.

=== Colt Buntline Special ===
Lake wrote about the Colt Buntline Special, a variant of the long-barreled Colt Single Action Army revolver. According to Lake's biography, dime novelist Ned Buntline had five Buntline Specials commissioned. Lake described them as extra-long Colt Single Action Army revolvers with 12-inch (300 mm) barrels. Buntline was supposed to have presented them to lawmen in thanks for their help with contributing "local color" to his western yarns. According to Lake, the revolver was equipped with a detachable metal shoulder stock. Lake wrote that Earp and four other well-known western lawmen – Bat Masterson, Bill Tilghman, Charlie Bassett and Neal Brown – each received a Buntline Special. However, neither Tilghman nor Brown were lawmen then.

Researchers have never found any record of such an order received by the Colt company, and Ned Buntline's alleged connections to Earp's have been largely discredited.

After the publication of Lake's book, various Colt revolvers with long (10" or 16") barrels were referred to as "Colt Buntlines". Colt re-introduced the revolvers in its second generation revolvers produced after 1956. The Buntline Special was further popularized by The Life and Legend of Wyatt Earp television series.

=== Dubious claims by Earp ===
Earp's reputation has been confused by inaccurate, conflicting, and false stories told about him by others, and by his own claims that cannot be corroborated. For example, in an interview with a reporter in Denver in 1896, he denied that he had killed Johnny Ringo. He then flipped his story, claiming he had killed Ringo. In 1888, he was interviewed by an agent of California historian Hubert H. Bancroft, and Earp claimed that he had killed "over a dozen stage robbers, murderers, and cattle thieves". In about 1918 he told Forrestine Hooker, who wrote an unpublished manuscript, and then Frank Lockwood, who wrote Pioneer Days in Arizona in 1932, that he was the one who killed Johnny Ringo as Ringo left Arizona in March 1882, almost four months before Ringo was found dead with a bullet wound to the temple. Earp also included details that do not match what is known about Ringo's death. Earp repeated that claim to at least three other people.

At the hearing following the Tombstone shootout, Earp said he had been marshal in Dodge City, a claim he repeated in an August 16, 1896, interview that appeared in The San Francisco Examiner. But Earp had only been an assistant city marshal there.

During an interview with his future biographer Stuart Lake during the late 1920s, Earp said that he arrested notorious gunslinger Ben Thompson in Ellsworth, Kansas, on August 15, 1873, when news accounts and Thompson's own contemporary account about the episode do not mention his presence. He also told Lake that he had hunted buffalo during 1871 and 1872, but Earp was arrested three times in the Peoria area during that period for "keeping and being found in a house of ill-fame". He was arrested and jailed on a horse theft charge on April 6, 1871. However he was not convicted of the last charge and was released.

In the same interview Earp claimed that George Hoyt had intended to kill him, although newspaper accounts from that time report differently. He also said he and Bat Masterson had confronted Clay Allison when he was sent to Dodge City to finish George Hoyt's job, and that they had forced him to back down. Two other accounts contradicted Earp, crediting cattleman Dick McNulty and Long Branch Saloon owner Chalk Beeson with convincing Allison and his Cowboys to surrender their guns. Cowboy Charlie Siringo witnessed the incident and left a written account.

== Modern image ==
=== Role in O.K. Corral gunfight ===
Wyatt outlived his brothers, and due to the fame Wyatt gained from Lake's biography and later adaptations of it, he is often mistakenly viewed as the central character and hero of the gunfight at the O.K. Corral. In fact, Virgil Earp, as Deputy U.S. Marshal and Tombstone City Marshal, actually held the legal authority in Tombstone the day of the shootout. Virgil had considerably more experience with weapons and combat as a Union soldier in the Civil War, and in law enforcement as a sheriff, constable, and marshal than did Wyatt. As city marshal, Virgil made the decision to enforce a city ordinance prohibiting carrying weapons in town and to disarm the Cowboys. Wyatt was only a temporary assistant marshal to his brother.

=== Cultural image as Western lawman ===
Earp's modern-day reputation is that of the Old West's "toughest and deadliest gunman of his day". He is "a cultural icon, a man of law and order, a mythic figure of a West where social control and order were notably absent". Due to Lake's fanciful biography and because Wyatt outlived all of his brothers, his name became famous and he is the primary figure in many movies, TV shows, biographies and works of fiction.

Western historian and author John Boessenecker describes Earp:

[He was an] enigmatic figure ... He always lived on the outer fringe of respectable society, and his closest companions were gamblers and sporting men ... Wyatt never set down roots in any one place; when the money stopped coming in or his problems became too great, he would pull up stakes and move on to the next boomtown ... For his entire life was a gamble, an effort to make money without working hard for it, to succeed quickly without ever settling in for the long haul.

=== Josephine Earp memoir ===
One of the most well known, and for many years respected, books about Wyatt Earp was the book I Married Wyatt Earp, originally credited as a factual memoir by Josephine Marcus Earp. Published in 1976, it was edited by amateur historian Glenn Boyer, and published by the respected University of Arizona Press. It was immensely popular for many years, capturing the imagination of people with an interest in western history, studied in classrooms, cited by scholars, and relied upon as factual by filmmakers.

In 1998 writer Tony Ortega wrote a lengthy investigative article for the Phoenix New Times for which he interviewed Boyer. Boyer said that he was uninterested in what others thought of the accuracy of what he had written. "This is an artistic effort. I don't have to adhere to the kind of jacket that these people are putting on me. I am not a historian. I'm a storyteller."Boyer admitted that the book is "100 percent Boyer". He said the book was not really a first-person account, that he had interpreted Wyatt Earp in Josephine's voice, and admitted that he could not produce any documents to vindicate his methods.

The credibility of Boyer and the University Press was severely damaged. In 2000 the university referred all questions to its lawyers who investigated some of the allegations about Boyer's work. Later that year, the Press removed the book from its catalog. The book has been discredited as a fraud and a hoax that cannot be relied on.

As a result, other works by Boyer were subsequently questioned. His book, Wyatt Earp's Tombstone Vendetta, published in 1993, was according to Boyer based on an account written by a previously unknown Tombstone journalist that he named "Theodore Ten Eyck", but whose identity could not be independently verified. Boyer claimed that the manuscript was "clearly authentic" and that it contained "fascinating revelations (if they are true) and would make an ace movie". Boyer later said the character was in fact a blend of "scores of accounts", but could not provide any sources.

History professor William Urban also described "the questionable scholarship of Glenn Boyer, the dominant figure in Earpiana for the past several decades, who has apparently invented a manuscript and then cited it as a major source in his publications. This does not surprise this reviewer, who has personal experience with Boyer's pretentious exaggeration of his acquaintance with Warren County records."
