= Powder River (film) =

1953 film by Louis King

- Directed by: Louis King
- Screenplay by: Daniel Mainwaring (as Geoffrey Homes)
- Story by: Sam Hellman (from a story by)
- Based on: Wyatt Earp: Frontier Marshal; 1931 novel by Stuart N. Lake
- Produced by: Andre Hakim
- Starring: Rory Calhoun; Corinne Calvet; Cameron Mitchell
- Cinematography: Edward Cronjager
- Edited by: William B. Murphy
- Color process: Technicolor
- Production company: 20th Century Fox
- Distributed by: 20th Century Fox
- Release date: June 17, 1953
- Running time: 78 minutes
- Country: United States
- Language: English
- Budget: $985,000
- Box office: $1,000,000 (US)

Powder River is a 1953 American Western film directed by Louis King and starring Rory Calhoun, Corinne Calvet and Cameron Mitchell.

The screenplay was adapted by Daniel Mainwaring (under his pseudonym "Geoffrey Homes") from the book Wyatt Earp: Frontier Marshal by Stuart N. Lake, who two years later was the story consultant on the ABC/Desilu western television series, The Life and Legend of Wyatt Earp. Unlike that television series, names and places in this film were given fictional names, so that Earp became "Chino Bull," Doc Holliday became "Mitch Hardin," the Clanton brothers became the "Logan Brothers," and Tombstone became the titular "Powder River."

This was the fourth film based on Lake's book to be released by 20th Century Fox, preceded by the 1934 Frontier Marshal, the identically titled 1939 Frontier Marshal, and the 1946 My Darling Clementine.

== Plot ==
In 1875, ex-lawman Chino Bull puts away his guns and heads for the Powder River with old pal Johnny Slater to pan for gold. When he is ambushed by outlaws Loney Logan and Will Horn, Johnny comes to his rescue, and he rides to town for supplies.

At a saloon run by beautiful Frenchie Dumont, he meets Loney's brother, Harvey, a card dealer. A drunken Sam Harris begins shooting up the place, killing the sheriff with a stray bullet as everyone else flees. Chino volunteers to go in after him and knocks him out, but declines the offer to become sheriff. Returning to the river, Chino finds Johnny dead and their gold stolen. Now broke, he returns to town and reluctantly takes on the sheriff job.

Frenchie's beau, gunslinger Mitch Hardin, rides into town and challenges Chino, but is stricken with a headache so painful it incapacitates him.

A stagecoach brings to town the sophisticated Debbie Allen, who has come from Connecticut to find her former sweetheart, Mitch, who was once a doctor there. She learns that Mitch is now involved with Frenchie and also that he is suffering from a brain tumor, causing the severe headaches. Debbie decides to go back east on the next stage.

Chino sets a trap. Accompanied by Mitch, who owes Chino for saving his life, and let word leak of a $300,000 gold shipment being aboard. Loney's men come to rob it and are defeated. Later in town Chino arrests Harvey and then Debbie is accidentally shot by Harvey's men when they attack Chino in the barn. Mitch is the only one with the surgical skill to save Debbie's life, and he does so

Loney's gang tries to rescue Harvey but he is shot by Chino while trying to escape. Loney's gang attack and Chino kills Loney.

When Debbie tells Mitch she is staying, Mitch decides to leave. Chino discovers that it was in fact Mitch who murdered Johnny and stole their gold. As they begin to shoot it out, Mitch shoots Chino's gun out of his hand, but then collapses in agony and dies in Chino's arms. Frenchie arrives, is distraught and cradles Mitch's head. The next day, Frenchie boards the stage, leaving Chino and Debbie to a future together.

== Cast ==
- Rory Calhoun as Chino Bullock
- Corinne Calvet as Frenchie Drumont
- Cameron Mitchell as Mitch Herdin
- Penny Edwards as Debbie Allen
- Carl Betz as Loney Logan
- John Dehner as Harvey Logan
- Raymond Greenleaf as Prudy
- Victor Sutherland as Mayor Lowery
