= Frontier Marshal =

Frontier Marshal may refer to:

- Frontier Marshal (1934 film), an American western starring George O'Brien
- Frontier Marshal (1939 film), an American western starring Randolph Scott
- Wyatt Earp: Frontier Marshal, a 1931 novel by Stuart N. Lake; basis for both films
