= Buntline =

Buntline may refer to:

- Buntline hitch, a knot used for attaching a rope to an object
- Clewlines and buntlines, lines used to handle the sails of a square rigged ship
- Colt Buntline, a long-barreled revolver
- Ned Buntline (1821–1886), an American publisher, journalist, writer, and publicist
