= Ned Buntline =

American novelist

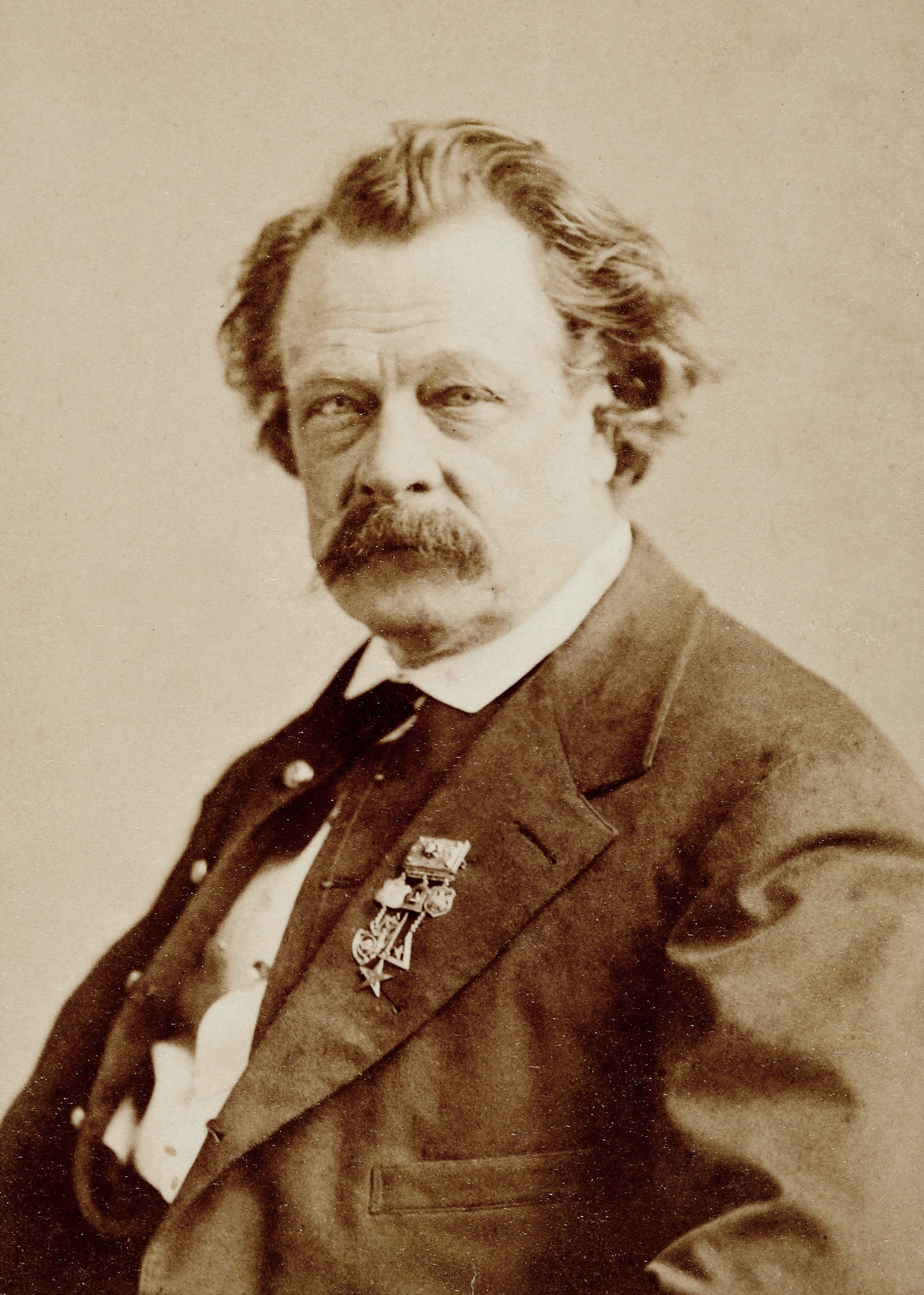
- Born: Edward Zane Carroll Judson; March 20, 1821; Harpersfield, New York, U.S.
- Died: July 16, 1886 (aged 65); Stamford, New York, U.S.
- Occupations: Dime novelist; author
- Spouses: Seberina Escudero; Annie Abigail Bennett; Marie Gardiner; Katharine Myers Aitchison; Lovanche L. Swart; Anna Fuller
- Children: Mary Carrolita Briggs, Irene Elizabeth Brush, Alexander McClintock, Edwardina McCormick, Irene A. Judson, Edward Z.C. Judson, Jr.

Edward Zane Carroll Judson Sr. (March 20, 1821 – July 16, 1886), known by his pen name Ned Buntline, was an American publisher, journalist, and writer.

== Early life and military service ==
Judson was born on March 20, 1821 in Harpersfield, New York. (Note: There are several different accounts of Judson's birth date and place. The Navy Department, Office of Naval Records and Library, Washington, D. C. officially records March 20, 1821.) He moved with his parents to Bethany, Pennsylvania in 1826, then to Philadelphia in 1834. His father Levi Carroll Judson was a lawyer and wanted his son to be a clergyman.

In November 1834, Judson ran away to sea as a soldier, and the next year he shipped on board a Navy vessel. A number of years later, he rescued the crew of a boat that had been run down by a Fulton Ferry in New York's East River. As a result, he received a commission as a midshipman in the Navy from President Martin Van Buren on February 10, 1838, and he was assigned to the USS Levant. He later served on the USS Constellation and the USS Boston.

As a seaman, he served in the Seminole Wars, but he saw little combat, and he resigned after four years. During the Civil War, he enlisted in the First New York Mounted Rifles and rose to the rank of sergeant before he was dishonorably discharged for drunkenness.

== Early literary efforts ==
Judson's first publication was an adventure story in The Knickerbocker in 1838. He spent several years in the East starting up newspapers and story papers, only to have most of them fail. An early success that helped launch his fame was The Mysteries and Miseries of New York, a gritty serial story of the Bowery and slums of New York City. He was an opinionated man and strongly advocated nativism and temperance; he also became a leader in the Know Nothing movement. In 1844, he adopted the pen name "Ned Buntline". "Buntline" is the nautical term for a rope that attaches to the bottom of a square sail.

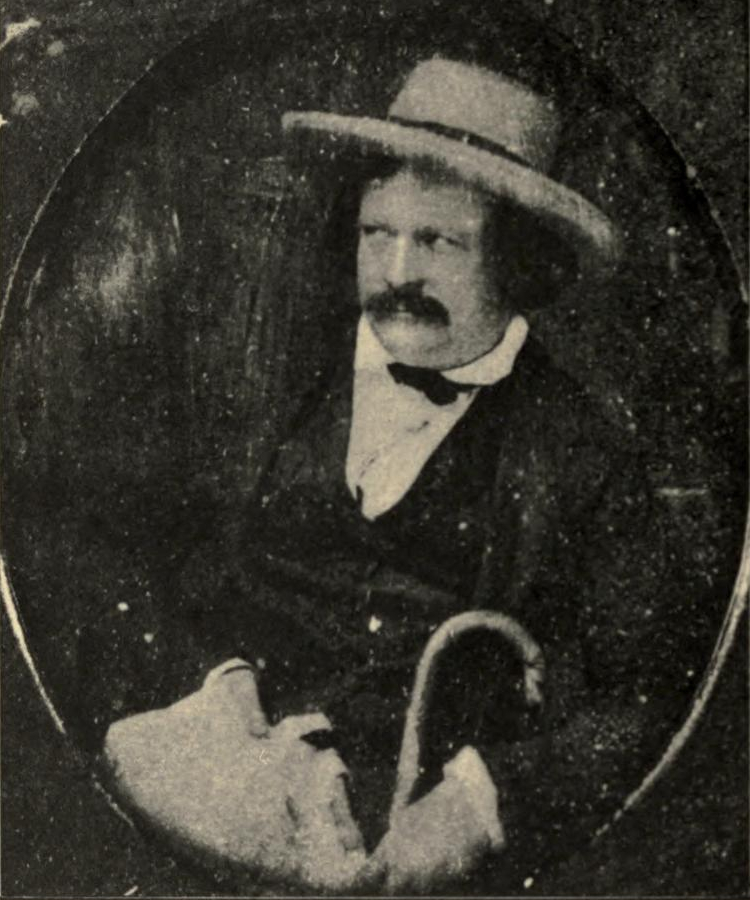
Daguerreotype of Buntline.

In 1841, Buntline's father, Levi Carroll Judson, his wife, and his daughter moved to Pittsburgh, where Levi set up a law practice and his wife and daughter Irene opened a select school in the basement of the First Baptist Church. Here, the Judson and Allen families became acquainted. Rebecca Allen and Irene Judson were teaching at the time and became social friends. Through this connection, William and George Allen, Rebecca's brothers, became friends with Buntline when he arrived in Pittsburgh in December 1843, ostensibly to study law with his father, but in reality to start a literary magazine. Buntline published just two issues of Ned Buntline's Magazine in Pittsburgh in 1844 before it failed.

William and George were a co-owners of the steamboat Cicero and they invited Ned to go along on a January 1844 voyage to Cincinnati. On this cruise, Buntline told the Allen brothers of his recent marriage in St. Augustine, Florida, to Seberina Escudero, whom he described to the two brothers in glowing terms. Escudero joined her husband in Pittsburgh in May 1844. In August 1844, Buntline and Escudero relocated to Cincinnati, where Ned partnered with Lucius Hine and Hudson Kidd in an effort to purchase the Western Literary Journal. This magazine also failed.

Estranged from his family and in financial straits, Buntline borrowed money from the Allen brothers and pawned his wife's jewelry to meet living expenses. In October, William Allen hired Buntline as a hand on his steamboat, where Ned accepted a counterfeit $10 note and lost a barrel of whiskey. While her husband was steam-boating, Escudero was sewing shirts in Cincinnati for 12 1/2 cents each. In October 1844, the Knickerbocker published an article of Ned's titled "Running the Blockade" in which the hero of the story was William Allen. In January 1845 with the assistance of the Allen brothers, Buntline relocated to Nashville, where Hudson Kidd secured temporary living quarters for Escudero while her husband went off to St. Louis for a time. By January 1846, she was living in the Gower House in Smithland, Kentucky.

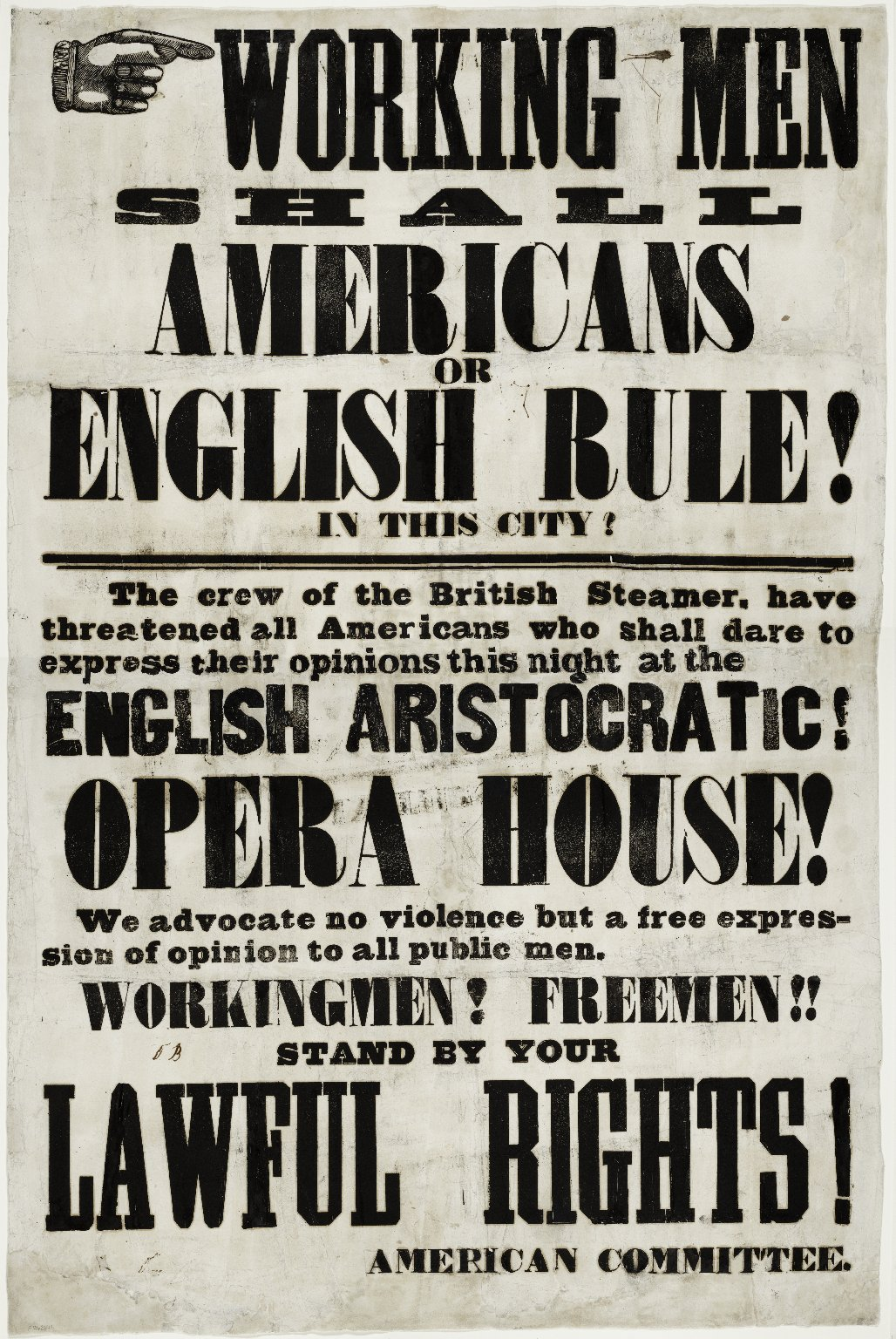
A handbill, produced by Ned Buntline and the American Committee handed out prior to the Astor Place riot.

Buntline started a third magazine, Buntline's Own, at this time. It was usually said to have been published in Nashville, but the Allen brothers' journals suggest that the early issues at least were printed in Smithland. George Allen's journal of January 25, 1846, said that upon his return to Smithland, he went to visit Escudero and learned that she had died there days earlier. William Allen later stated she was buried in Smithland.

In 1845, his Cincinnati venture, Western Literary Journal and Monthly Magazine, was facing bankruptcy, and he fled from Ohio. In Eddyville, Kentucky, he collected a $600 bounty for single-handedly capturing two murderers. He moved to Nashville, Tennessee, and used the money to start a magazine, Ned Buntline's Own.

Judson had a romance with the teenaged wife of Robert Porterfield in Nashville in 1846. On 14 March 1846, Porterfield challenged Judson to a duel, and Judson killed him. At his trial for murder, Judson was shot and wounded by Porterfield's brother, and during the chaos, escaped from custody. He was subsequently captured by a lynch mob and hanged from an awning, but was rescued by friends. A Tennessee grand jury refused to indict him for murder.

In 1847, the Boston publisher and dime-novel author Maturin Murray Ballou paid Judson $100 to write The Black Avenger of the Spanish Main: or, The Fiend of Blood, a melodramatic and violent pirate novel. This was followed the same year with The Red Revenger; Or, The Pirate King of the Floridas. Buntline moved Ned Buntline's Own to New York City in 1848.

Through his columns and his association with New York City's notorious gangs of the early 19th century, Buntline was one of the instigators of the Astor Place Riot, which left 23 people dead. He was fined $250 and sentenced to a year's imprisonment in September 1849.

After his release, he devoted himself to writing sensational stories for weekly newspapers, and his income purportedly amounted to $20,000 a year. In 1852 he was involved in a nativist riot in St. Louis, while he was a member of the Know Nothing Party. He eluded the authorities but was arrested in 1872 while touring and promoting his play in the city.

Although a heavy drinker, he traveled around the country giving lectures about temperance. He was an ardent Republican until the election of 1884, when he refused to support James G. Blaine. On one of his temperance lecture tours, he met William F. "Buffalo Bill" Cody.

== Buffalo Bill ==
Buntline was traveling through Nebraska when he heard that Wild Bill Hickok was in Fort McPherson. Buntline had read a popular article about Hickok and hoped to interview him and write a dime novel about him. He found Hickok in a saloon and rushed up to him, saying, "There's my man! I want you!" By this time in his life, Hickok had an aversion to surprises. He threatened Buntline with a gun and ordered him out of town in 24 hours. Buntline took him at his word and left the saloon. Still looking to get information on his subject, Buntline took to finding Hickok's friends. This is likely how he first met Buffalo Bill.

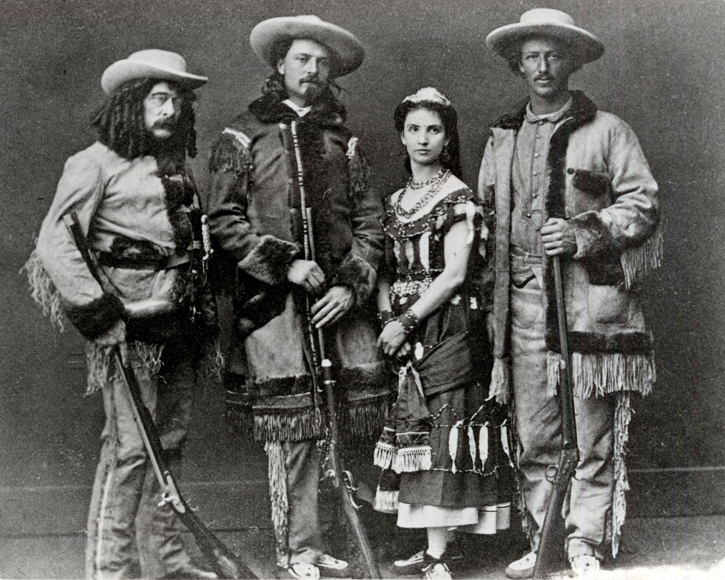
Buntline, Buffalo Bill Cody, Giuseppina Morlacchi, Texas Jack Omohundro in The Scouts of the Prairie, 1872.

Buntline took a train in 1869 from California to Nebraska, where he had been lecturing on the virtues of temperance. There, he met William Cody, who was with a group of men who had recently participated in a battle against the Sioux and Cheyenne.

Traveling with the gregarious Cody, Buntline became friends with him and later claimed that he created the nickname "Buffalo Bill" for the hero of his serial novel Buffalo Bill, the King of the Border Men, published in the New York Weekly beginning 23 December 1869.

Originally, Buntline was going to cast Cody as a sidekick of "Wild Bill" Hickok, but he found Cody's character more interesting than Hickok's. Buntline presented Cody as a "compendium of cliches"; however, this did not stop the New York playwright Frank Meader from using Buntline's novel as the basis of a play about Cody's life in 1872. In the same year, Buntline and James Gordon Bennett Jr. invited Cody to New York City, where Cody saw the play at the Bowery Theater. In December of that year, Buntline also wrote a Buffalo Bill play, Scouts of the Prairie, which was performed by Cody himself, Texas Jack Omohundro, the Italian ballerina Giuseppina Morlacchi, and Buntline.

For some time, 6-year-old Carlos Montezuma also was featured in the show as "Atzeka, the Apache-child of Cochise", being the only genuine American Indian on stage, while his adoptive father, the Italian photographer Carlo Gentile, was hired to produce and sell promotional cartes de visite of the cast members.

Cody at first was a reluctant actor, but came to enjoy the spotlight. Scouts of the Prairie opened in Chicago in December 1872 and starred Cody. It was panned by critics, but was a success nonetheless. It was performed to packed theaters across the country for years. Cody served as a scout for the Army in the summer; when campaigning stopped for the winter, he would head to the stage. Buntline's play served as training for Cody's later Wild West show.

== Later work and death ==
Buntline continued to write dime novels, but none was as successful as his earlier work. Later in life, he embellished his military career, claiming to have been chief of scouts in the Indian Wars with the rank of colonel, and to have received 20 wounds in battle. He also used these pseudonyms: Captain Hal Decker, Scout Jack Ford, and Edward Minturn. He settled into his home in Stamford, New York, where he died of congestive heart failure on July 18, 1886. He was once one of the wealthiest authors in America, but his wife had to sell his home the "Eagle's Nest" to pay his debts.

Buntline's novels may have had unintended consequences. Some readers became thrilled with the exploits of western outlaws, and the novels glamorized crime in their eyes. Female bandits Little Britches and Cattle Annie, for instance, read dime novels, which allegedly aroused their interest in the Bill Doolin gang and may have propelled them into a life of crime.

== The Buntline Special ==
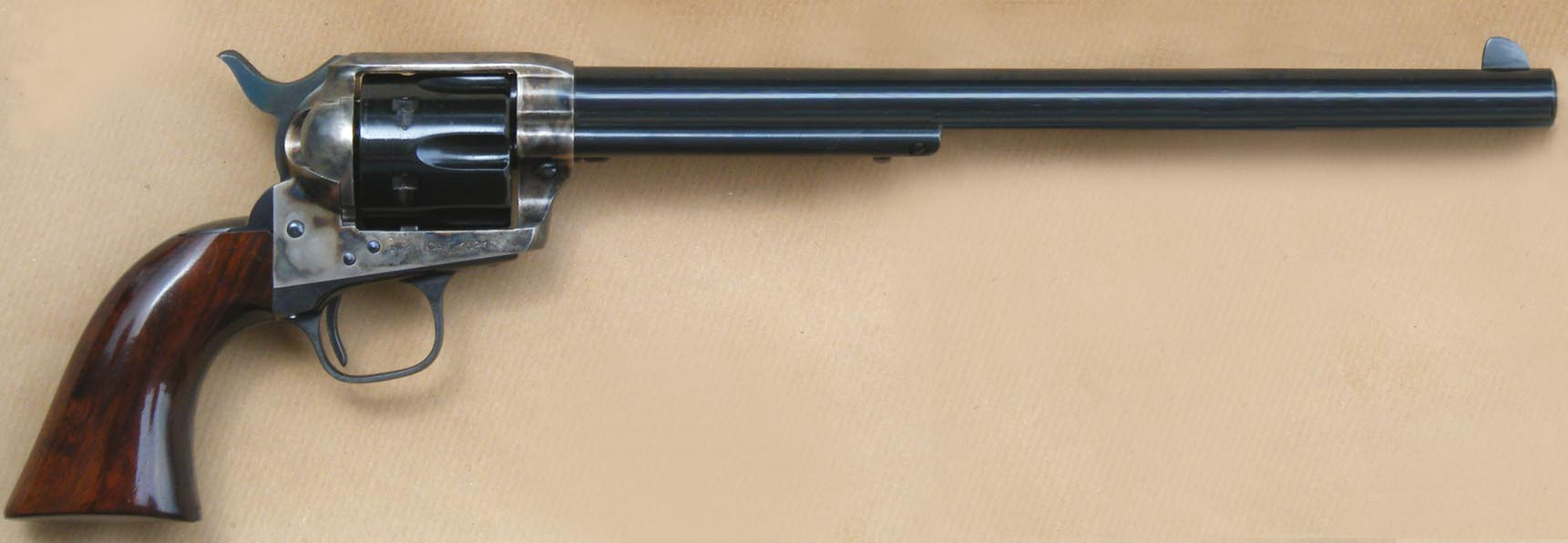
Colt Buntline Special

Stuart N. Lake wrote in Wyatt Earp: Frontier Marshal (1931) that Wyatt Earp, Bat Masterson, Bill Tilghman, Charlie Bassett, and Neal Brown each received a Colt Single Action Army revolver as a gift from Buntline in thanks for their help in contributing local color to his Western yarns. The revolvers were said to be chambered in .45 Colt with 12-inch barrels, removable shoulder stocks, standard sights, and wooden grips into which the name "Ned" was ornately carved. These revolvers came to be known collectively as the Buntline Special. According to Lake, Earp kept his at the original 12-inch length, but the four other recipients cut their barrels down to 7½ inches. Modern researchers have not found any evidence in secondary sources or primary documents of the guns' existence prior to the publication of Lake's book.

Lake expended much effort trying to track these guns through the Colt company, Masterson, and Earp's contacts in Alaska. Researchers have not found any record of an order received by Colt, and Buntline's alleged connection with Earp has been largely discredited by William B. Shillinberg, who presented a detailed case to confute the Buntline Special legend.

Massad Ayoob stated in Greatest Handguns of the World that "historians debate whether Wyatt Earp owned a 'Buntline Special' (author is inclined to believe that he did), but Colt manufactured many in the latter half of the 20th century".

== Portrayals in popular culture ==
Dick Elliott played "Major Ned Buntline" in the 1935 film Annie Oakley with Barbara Stanwyck in the title role. Thomas Mitchell played him in the 1944 film Buffalo Bill. Lloyd Corrigan played him in six episodes of the ABC Western series The Life and Legend of Wyatt Earp from 1955 to 1958. Burt Lancaster played him (referred to as "the Legend Maker") in Robert Altman's 1976 film Buffalo Bill and the Indians.
