= Frontier Marshal (1934 film) =

1934 film by Lewis Seiler

- Directed by: Lewis Seiler
- Written by: Stuart Anthony; William M. Conselman
- Based on: Wyatt Earp: Frontier Marshal; 1931 novel by Stuart N. Lake
- Produced by: Sol M. Wurtzel
- Starring: George O'Brien; Irene Bentley; Alan Edwards
- Cinematography: Robert H. Planck
- Edited by: W. Donn Hayes
- Music by: Arthur Lange
- Distributed by: Fox Film
- Release date: January 19, 1934 (U.S.)
- Running time: 66 minutes
- Country: United States
- Language: English

Frontier Marshal is a 1934 American Pre-Code Western film directed by Lewis Seiler and starring George O'Brien. Produced by Fox Film and Sol M. Wurtzel, the film is the first based on Stuart N. Lake's enormously popular but largely fictitious "biography" of Wyatt Earp, Wyatt Earp: Frontier Marshal. A second version of the film, also produced by Wurtzel, was made in 1939, and a third interpretation by John Ford entitled My Darling Clementine was released in 1946.

He supposedly wrote the book with Earp's input, and it portrays Earp as a fearless lawman. But before the first movie was released, his widow Josephine Earp sued Fox Film Corporation for $50,000 in an attempt to keep them from making the film. She said it was an "unauthorized portrayal" of Wyatt Earp. She succeeded in getting Earp's name completely excised from the movie. His character was renamed "Michael Wyatt," and the movie was released as Frontier Marshal.

== Plot ==
Wandering lawman Michael Wyatt rides into a lawless town and runs into conflict with the local boss, Ben Melton.

== Cast ==
- George O'Brien as Michael Wyatt
- Irene Bentley as Mary Reid
- George E. Stone as David Ruskin
- Alan Edwards as Doc Warren
- Ruth Gillette as Queenie LaVerne
- Berton Churchill as Ben Melton
- Frank Conroy as George Reid
- Ward Bond as Ben Murchison
- Edward LeSaint as Judge Walters
- Russell Simpson as Editor Pickett

== Production ==
Actor Ward Bond appears in three films based on the Wyatt Earp story and Lake's spurious book: this film, the 1939 version and John Ford's My Darling Clementine (1946), playing different roles in all three.
