= My Darling Clementine =

1946 film by John Ford

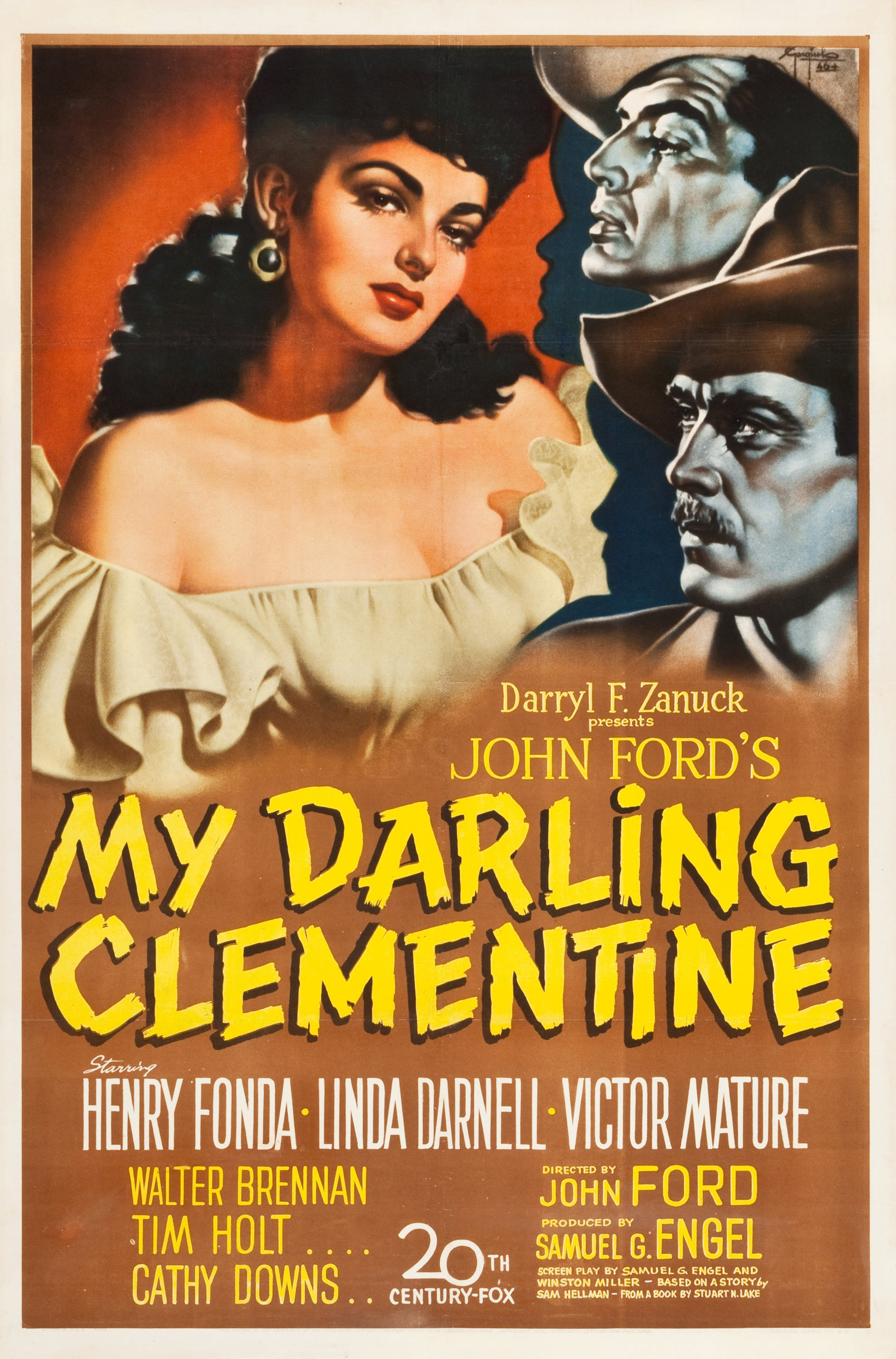
- Theatrical release poster
- Directed by: John Ford
- Screenplay by: Samuel G. Engel; Winston Miller
- Story by: Sam Hellman
- Based on: Wyatt Earp: Frontier Marshal; 1931 novel by Stuart N. Lake
- Produced by: Samuel G. Engel
- Starring: Henry Fonda; Linda Darnell; Victor Mature; Walter Brennan; Tim Holt; Cathy Downs
- Cinematography: Joseph MacDonald
- Edited by: Dorothy Spencer
- Music by: Alfred Newman; Cyril J. Mockridge
- Production company: 20th Century Fox
- Distributed by: 20th Century Fox
- Release date: December 3, 1946
- Running time: 97 minutes
- Country: United States
- Language: English
- Budget: $2 million
- Box office: $2,750,000 (US rentals)

My Darling Clementine is a 1946 American Western film directed by John Ford and starring Henry Fonda as Wyatt Earp during the period leading up to the gunfight at the O.K. Corral. The ensemble cast also features Victor Mature (as Doc Holliday), Linda Darnell, Walter Brennan, Tim Holt, Cathy Downs, and Ward Bond.

The title of the movie is borrowed from the theme song "Oh My Darling, Clementine", sung in parts over the opening and closing credits. The screenplay is based on the biography Wyatt Earp: Frontier Marshal by Stuart Lake, as were two earlier movies, both titled Frontier Marshal (released in 1934 and 1939, respectively).

My Darling Clementine is regarded by many critics as one of the greatest Western films ever made. In 1991, the film was deemed "culturally, historically, or aesthetically significant" by the Library of Congress and selected for preservation in the United States National Film Registry. It was among the third annual group of 25 films named to the registry.

== Plot ==
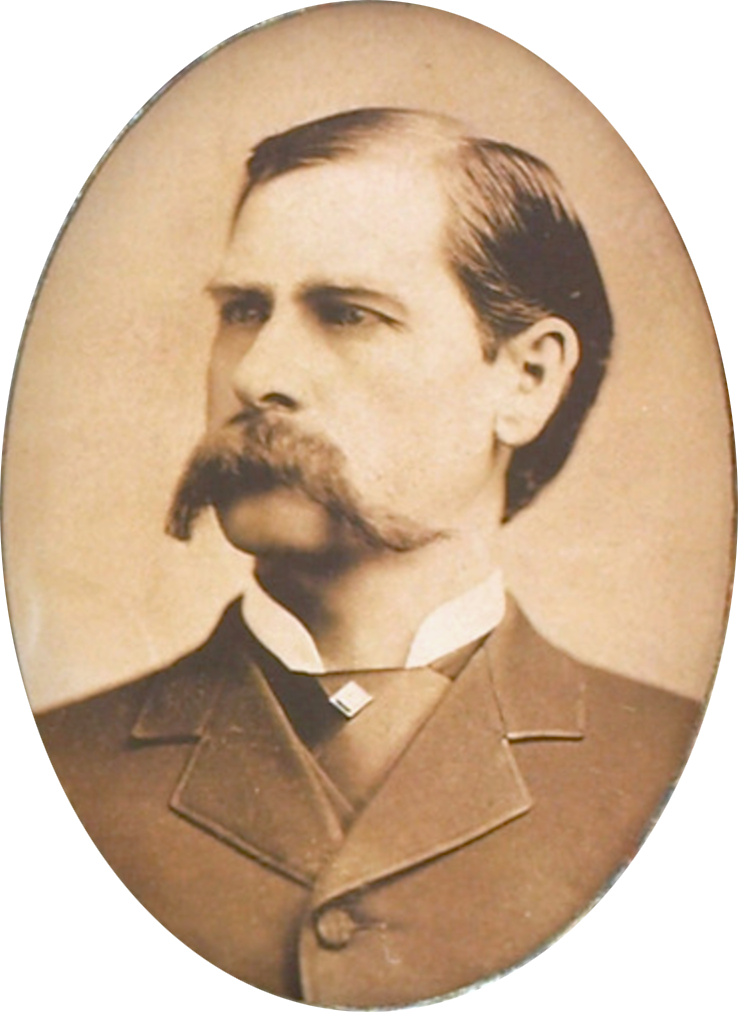
The real Wyatt Earp

Henry Fonda, Linda Darnell and Cathy Downs

In 1882, Wyatt, Morgan, Virgil, and James Earp are driving cattle in the Old West to California, While on the trail, the Earp brothers encounter Old Man Clanton and his sons. Clanton offers to buy their herd, but the Earps curtly refuse to sell it.

When the Earps arrive near Tombstone, the older brothers ride in, leaving James to watch the herd. The threesome soon learns that Tombstone has no marshall and has become a lawless town. While in town, an intoxicated Native American man starts shooting at the town residents. Wyatt stops his rampage. When the brothers return to their camp, they find their cattle rustled and James murdered.

Wyatt returns to Tombstone. Seeking to avenge James's murder, he takes the open position of town marshal. He runs into Doc Holliday, a gambler, dentist and expert gunslinger, along with the Clanton family. During this time, Clementine Carter, Doc's former girlfriend from Boston, arrives in Tombstone. Doc had left her a long time ago. She has been searching for Doc all over the region. Clementine rents a room at the same hotel where both Wyatt and Doc reside. Chihuahua, Doc's Latina girlfriend, sings in the local saloon. When Wyatt spots her trying to help gambler cheat at poker, he hauls Chihuahua out of the saloon and dunks her in a horse trough.

Doc, suffering badly from tuberculosis, is unhappy with Clementine's arrival; he tells her to return to Boston or he will leave Tombstone. Clementine decides to stay in town, so Doc leaves for Tucson, Arizona.

Wyatt, who has become enamored of Clementine,, begins to awkwardly court her. Blaming Clementine for Doc leaving Tombstone, Chihuahua starts an argument with Her. Wyatt walks in on their spat and breaks it up. He notices Chihuahua is wearing a silver cross that had belonged to James. She claims that Doc gave it to her.

Thinking that Doc may have shot James, Wyatt finds him in Tucson. Doc forces a shoot-out, ending with Wyatt shooting a pistol out of Doc's hand. After Doc adamantly denies shooting James, the two men go back to Tombstone to further question Chihuahua. At the saloon, she finally reveals that Billy Clanton gave her the silver cross.

Suddenly, Billy shoots Chihuahua through a window. Wyatt wounds Billy, but he manages to ride off. Wyatt then sends Virgil to pursue him. The chase leads to the Clanton homestead, where Billy dies of his wounds. Old Man Clanton then shoots Virgil in the back in cold blood.

In town, a reluctant Doc is persuaded to operate on Chihuahua. Hope swells for her successful recovery. The Clantons then arrive in Tombstone, toss Virgil's body on the street, and announce they will be waiting for Wyatt and Morgan at the O.K. Corral. Soon, Chihuahua dies of her wounds. An enraged Doc joins Wyatt and Morgan as they walk to the O.K. Corral at sunup.. A gunfight ensues in which Doc and all the Clantons are killed.

A somber Wyatt and Morgan decide to leave Tombstone. Morgan heads west in a horse and buggy. Wyatt bids Clementine farewell at the school house, wistfully promising that if he ever returns, he will look her up. Mounting his horse, Wyatt muses aloud, "Ma'am, I sure like that name...Clementine," and rides off to join his remaining brother.

== Cast ==
Henry Ford as Wyatt Earp

- Henry Fonda as Wyatt Earp
- Linda Darnell as Chihuahua
- Victor Mature as Dr. John Henry "Doc" Holliday
- Cathy Downs as Clementine Carter, Doc's former love from Boston
- Walter Brennan as Newman Haynes Clanton, a cattleman
- Tim Holt as Virgil Earp
- Ward Bond as Morgan Earp
- Alan Mowbray as Granville Thorndyke, a stage actor
- John Ireland as Billy Clanton
- Roy Roberts as Mayor
- Jane Darwell as Kate Nelson
- Grant Withers as Ike Clanton
- J. Farrell MacDonald as Mac the barman
- Russell Simpson as John Simpson
- Don Garner as James Earp (uncredited)
- Charles Stevens as Indian Charlie (uncredited)

== Production ==
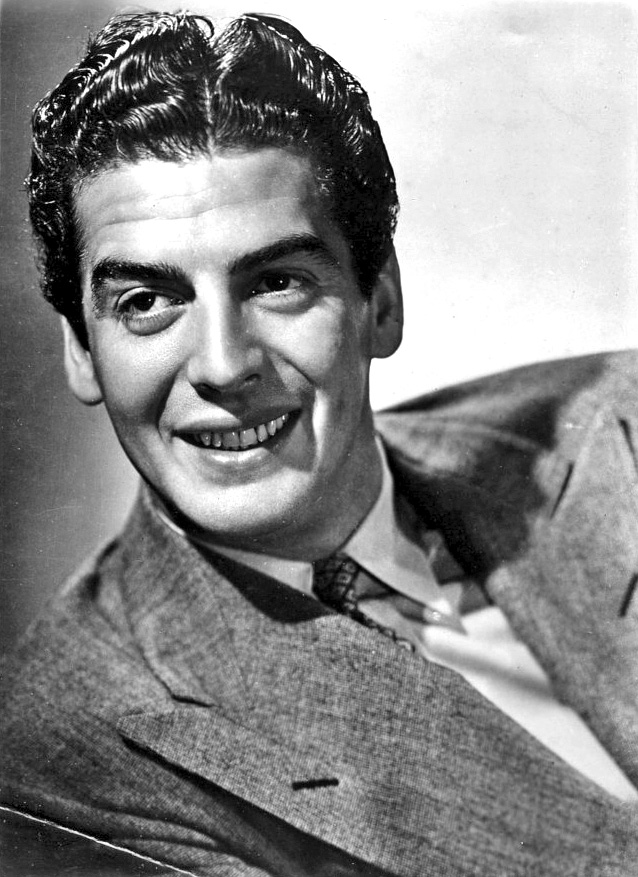
Victor Mature as Doc Holiday

=== Development ===
In 1931, Stuart Lake published Wyatt Earp: Frontier Marshal, two years after Wyatt's death; it became an instant bestseller.As far as historical fact go, the Lake book and the film are highly inaccurate. The film's title was Ford's suggestion, simply because he liked the song "Oh My Darling, Clementine".

Ford had known Wyatt Earp. When Ford was a prop boy during the silent pictures era, Wyatt would visit the film sets to see his friends from Tombstone days who were now actors. Ford recalled, "I used to give him a chair and a cup of coffee, and he told me about the fight at the O.K. Corral. So in My Darling Clementine, we did it exactly the way it had been." Ford did not want to make the film, but his contract required him to make one more movie for 20th Century Fox.

In their later years, Wyatt and Josephine Earp worked hard to eliminate any mention of Josephine's previous relationship with Tombstone Sheriff Johnny Behan or Wyatt's previous common-law marriage to Matty Blaylock. They successfully kept Josephine's name out of Lake's biography of Wyatt. After Wyatt died, Josephine threatened to sue the producers of My Darling Clementine to keep her name out of the film. Lake claimed that she attempted to influence what he wrote and hamper him in every way possible, including consulting lawyers. Josephine insisted she was striving to protect Wyatt's legacy.

=== Writing ===
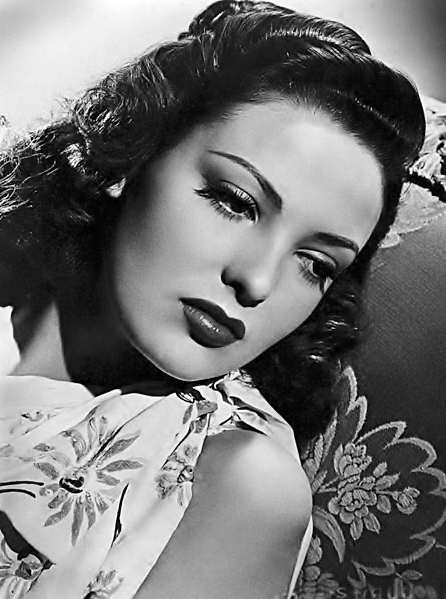
Linda Darnell as Chihuahua

The final script of My Darling Clementine varies considerably from historical fact. Clementine Carter is a fictional character, based possibly on a combination of Big Nose Kate, a companion of Holiday, and Josephine Earp. In addition the Earp brothers never owned cattle or worked as cowboys or drovers.

In real life, Old Man Clanton died before the gunfight at the O.K. Corral; it is unlikely that he ever met the Earp brothers. Holiday survived the shootout. James Earp, portrayed in My Darling Clementine as the youngest Earp and the first to die, actually was the eldest brother. James died in 1926. Josephine and Big Nose Kate were not mentioned in the film. The film says the gunfight occurred in 1882, when it actually occurred in 1881.

In My Darling Clementine, the itinerant actor, Granville Thorndyke (Alan Mowbray), bids farewell to the old soldier, "Dad" (Francis Ford, John Ford's elder brother), with lines from Joseph Addison's poem The Campaign:

Great souls by instinct to each other turn, Demand allegiance, and in friendship burn...

=== Filming ===
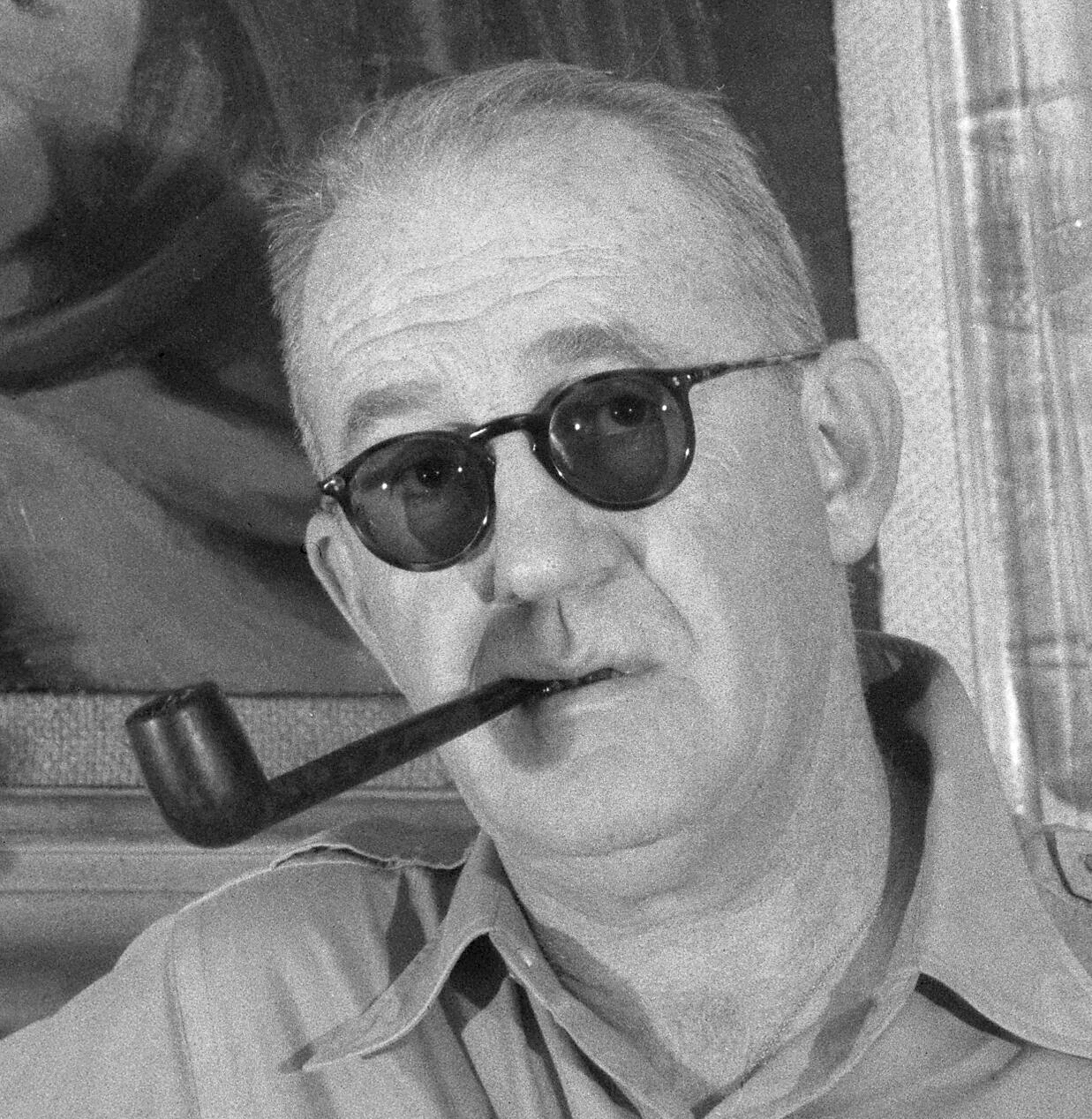
John Ford

Much of My Darling Clementine was shot in Monument Valley, a scenic desert region straddling the Arizona-Utah border that Ford used in other films. After seeing a preview screening of the film, Fox studio boss Darryl F. Zanuck thought Ford's original cut was too long and had some weak spots. He hired director Lloyd Bacon to shoot new footage and heavily edit the film.Bacon cut 30 minutes from the film run time.

While Ford's original cut of My Darling Clementine has not survived. However, a "prerelease" cut, dating from several months after the preview screening, was discovered in the University of California Los Angeles (UCLA) film archives. This version preserves some additional footage, along with alternative scoring and editing. UCLA film preservationist Robert Gitt edited a version of My Darling Clementine that incorporates some of the earlier version.

A significant change is the film's final scene; in the 1946 release, Earp kisses Clementine goodbye, but in Ford's original, he shakes her hand.

== Reception and legacy ==
My Darling Clementine is generally regarded as one of the best Westerns made by John Ford and one of his best films overall.

At the time of its release, Bosley Crowther lauded the film and wrote,

"The eminent director, John Ford, is a man who has a way with a Western like nobody in the picture trade. Seven years ago, his classic Stagecoach snuggled very close to fine art in this genre. And now, by George, he's almost matched it with My Darling Clementine ... But even with standard Western fiction—and that's what the script has enjoined—Mr. Ford can evoke fine sensations and curiously-captivating moods. From the moment that Wyatt and his brothers are discovered on the wide and dusty range, trailing a herd of cattle to a far-off promised land, a tone of pictorial authority is struck—and it is held. Every scene, every shot is the product of a keen and sensitive eye—an eye which has deep comprehension of the beauty of rugged people and a rugged world."

Variety wrote that,

"John Ford's direction is clearly stamped on the film with its shadowy lights, softly contrasted moods and measured pace, but a tendency is discernible towards stylization for the sake of stylization. At several points, the pic comes to a dead stop to let Ford go gunning for some arty effect."

Director Sam Peckinpah considered My Darling Clementine his favorite Western, and paid homage to it in several of his Westerns, including Major Dundee (1965) and The Wild Bunch (1969). Similarly, director Hayao Miyazaki called it one of his 10 favorite movies.Fifty years after its release, Roger Ebert reviewed My Darling Clementine and included it in his list of The Great Movies. He wrote it was,

"one of the sweetest and most good-hearted of all Westerns", unusual in making the romance between Earp and Clementine the heart of the film rather than the gunfight.

In 2004, Matt Bailey summarized the film's significance:

"If there is one film that deserves every word of praise ever uttered or written about it, it is John Ford's My Darling Clementine. Perhaps the greatest film in a career full of great films, arguably the finest achievement in a rich and magnificent genre, and undoubtedly the best version of one of America's most enduring myths, the film is an undeniable and genuine classic."

In the British Film Institute's 2012 Sight & Sound polls, seven critics and five directors named it one of their 10 favorite films. In the 2022 critic's poll, My Darling Clementine was tied for 243rd place with 21 other films.

In 2012, director Michael Mann named My Darling Clementine one of his ten favorite films, stating it was "possibly the finest drama in the Western genre" and "achieves near-perfection" in its cinematography and editing. It was also US President Harry Truman's favorite film.

The film currently scores a 100% on Rotten Tomatoes based on 33 reviews. The consensus states:

"Canny and coolly confident, My Darling Clementine is a definitive dramatization of the Wyatt Earp legend that shoots from the hip and hits its target in breezy style."
