= Stuart N. Lake =

American writer and wrestling promoter (1889-1964)

Stuart Nathaniel Lake
- Born: September 23, 1889; Rome, New York, U.S.
- Died: January 27, 1964 (aged 74); San Diego, California, U.S.
- Occupation: Author: Wyatt Earp: Frontier Marshal

Stuart Nathaniel Lake (September 23, 1889 in Rome, New York – January 27, 1964 in San Diego, California) was an American writer, professional wrestling promoter, and press aide who focused on the American Old West.

== Professional career ==
Lake was a professional wrestling promoter and a press aide to Theodore Roosevelt during the Bull Moose presidential campaign in 1912. During World War I, he was run over by a truck.

=== Works about Wyatt Earp ===
His 1931 biography of Wyatt Earp, Wyatt Earp: Frontier Marshal, was a best seller and was adapted for several films, including Frontier Marshal, a 1939 production starring Randolph Scott, and John Ford's My Darling Clementine. His work also inspired the 1955-1961 ABC television series, The Life and Legend of Wyatt Earp, starring Hugh O'Brian in the title role. The biography was later found to be highly fictional. Lake was the first writer to describe Earp's use of the Colt Buntline. Later researchers have been unable to establish that Earp ever owned such a weapon.

=== Other films ===
Lake also wrote for other motion pictures, including The Westerner, starring Gary Cooper and Walter Brennan; Powder River with Rory Calhoun; and Winchester '73 starring James Stewart.

== Bibliography ==
- Wyatt Earp: Frontier Marshal (fictionalized biography)
- The O.K. Corral Inquest (Introduction)
- In the Path of the Padres (Non-fiction)
- Tales of the Kansas cow towns (Magazine article, The Saturday Evening Post)

== Filmography ==
Lake wrote scripts for the following shows.

- Winchester '73 (TV Movie) (story-uncredited) 1967
- Powder River (based on a book by Lake) 1953
- Winchester '73 (story) 1950
- My Darling Clementine (based on the book by Lake) 1946
- Wells Fargo Days (Short) (dialogue/story) 1944
- The Westerner (film) (from the story by Lake) 1940
- Frontier Marshal (1939 film) (based on a book by Lake) 1939
- Wells Fargo (film) (based on a story by Lake) 1937
- Frontier Marshal (1939 film) (based on the novel Wyatt Earp: Frontier Marshal) 1934
- Buck Privates (story) 1928
