= Colt Buntline =

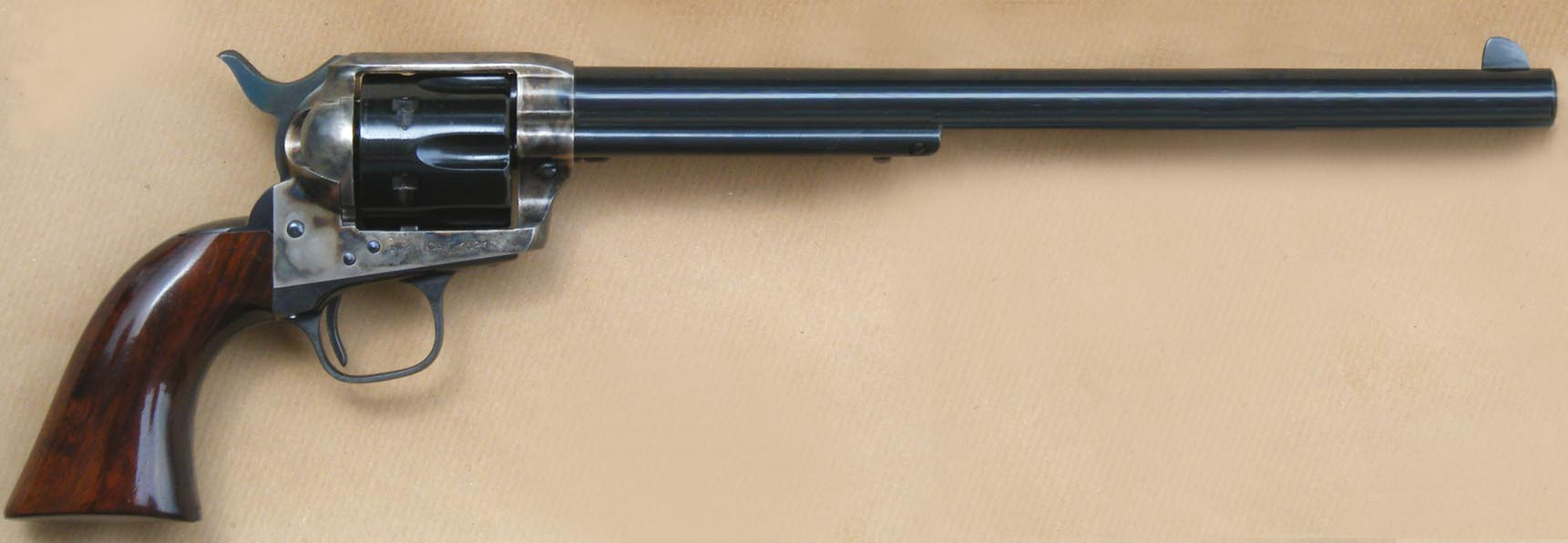
- Colt Buntline with 12-inch barrel.
- Type: Revolver
- Place of origin: United States

Production history
- Designer: Stuart N. Lake
- Manufacturer: Colt
- Produced: 1957–1992

Specifications
- Barrel length: 12 inches (30 cm)
- Cartridge: .45 Colt

The Colt Buntline Special was a long-barreled variant of the Colt Single Action Army revolver, which Stuart N. Lake described in his best-selling but largely fictionalized 1931 biography, Wyatt Earp: Frontier Marshal. According to Lake, the dime novelist Ned Buntline commissioned the production of five Buntline Specials. Lake described them as extra-long Colt Single Action Army revolvers, with a 12-inch (300 mm)-long barrel, and stated that Buntline presented them to five lawmen in thanks for their help in contributing local color to his western yarns.

Lake attributed the gun to Wyatt Earp, but modern researchers have not found any supporting evidence from secondary sources or in available primary documentation of the gun's existence prior to the publication of Lake's book. After its publication, various Colt revolvers with long (10-inch or 16-inch) barrels were called Colt Buntlines or Buntline Specials. Colt manufactured the pistol among its second-generation revolvers produced after 1956. A number of other manufacturers, such as Uberti, Navy Arms, and Cimarron Arms, have made their own versions of this long-barreled revolver.

== Origin ==
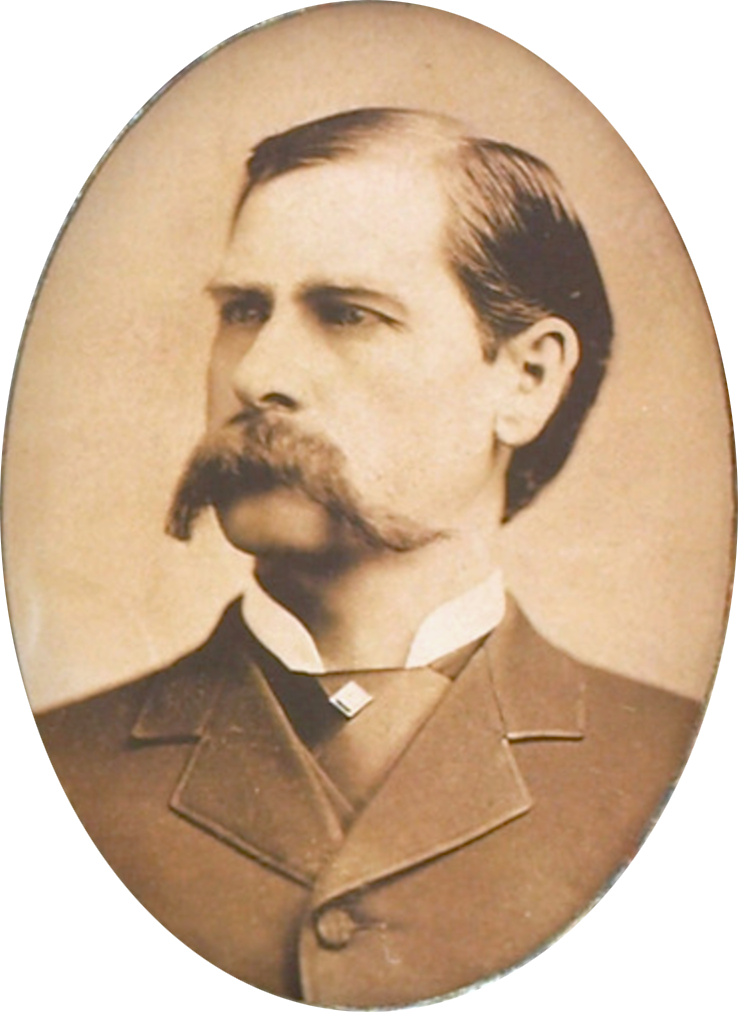
Wyatt Earp.

The revolver was first described by Stuart Lake in his highly fictionalized 1931 biography Wyatt Earp: Frontier Marshal. The extremely popular book turned Wyatt Earp into a "Western superman". Lake's creative biography and later Hollywood portrayals exaggerated Wyatt's profile as a western lawman.

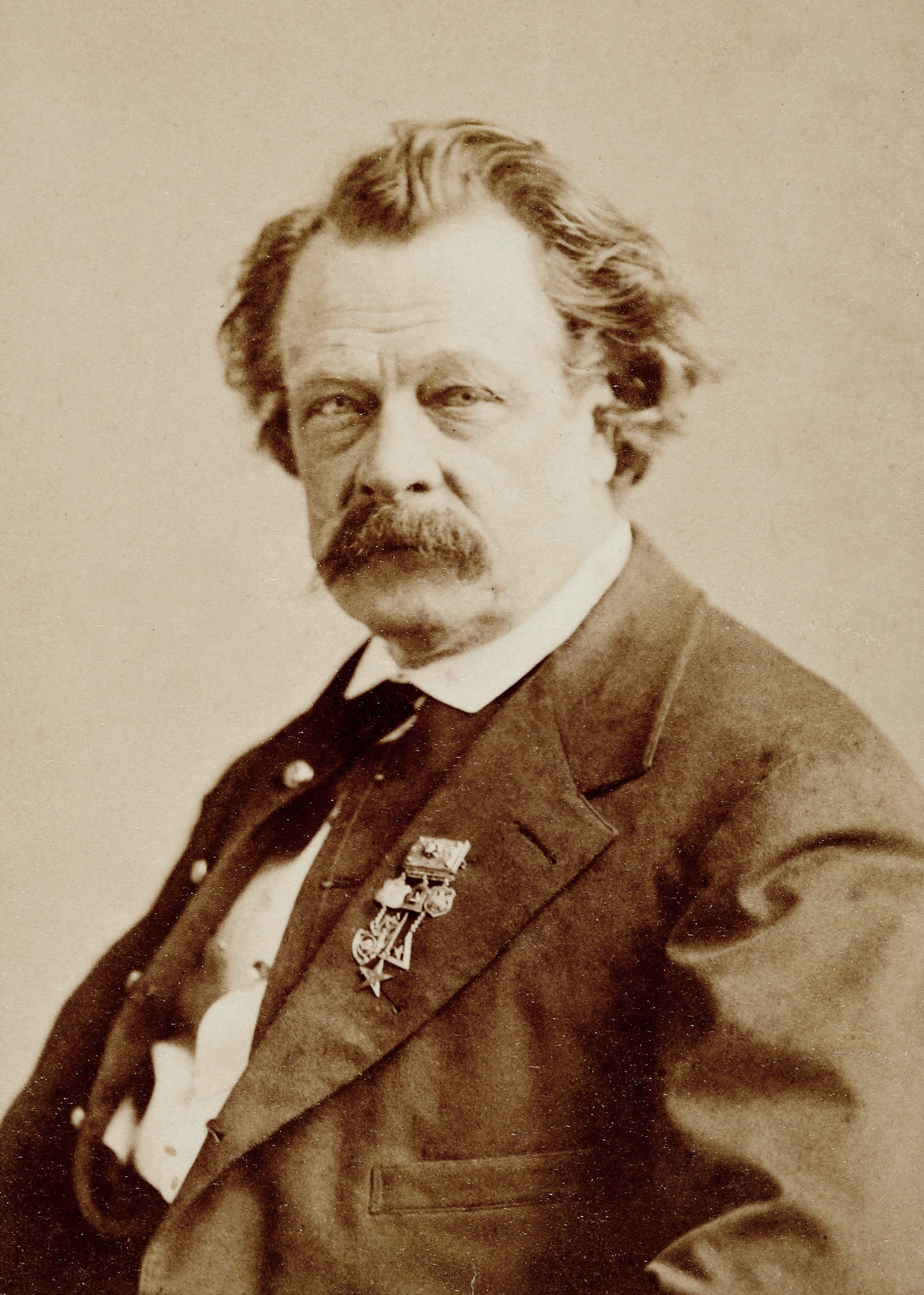
Ned Buntline, the pseudonym for dime-novelist Edward Zane Carroll Judson.

Lake wrote that dime novelist Edward Zane Carroll Judson Sr., writing under the pseudonym of Ned Buntline, commissioned the guns in repayment for "material for hundreds of frontier yarns." Although Ned Buntline wrote somewhere between twenty and twenty-four western novelettes and dime novels, the most sensational about William "Buffalo Bill" Cody—whom Buntline made nationally famous—none mentions Wyatt Earp. Lake claims that Ned Buntline traveled to Dodge City and made the presentations there, then went on up to North Platte, Nebraska, where he made a similar presentation to Cody. But Buntline traveled west of the Mississippi only once in his life, in 1869, in fact, and at the time of the supposed presentation to Earp in Dodge City, Wyatt and his brother were actually in Deadwood, Dakota Territory, mining for gold. In fact, Earp was under indictment for murder in Dodge City at the time. Cody likewise was not in North Platte, but in Wyoming scouting for the US Cavalry in pursuit of Sitting Bull and the Cheyenne and Sioux bands that had wiped out Custer at the Little Bighorn the previous summer. According to descendants of Wyatt Earp's cousins, he owned a Colt .45-caliber and a Winchester lever-action shotgun.

There is no conclusive evidence as to the kind of pistol that Earp usually carried, though according to some sources, on the day of the Gunfight at the O.K. Corral, October 26, 1881, he carried a Smith & Wesson Model 3 with an 8-inch (200 mm) barrel. Earp had received the revolver as a gift from Tombstone mayor and newspaper editor John Clum of The Tombstone Epitaph . Lake later admitted that he had "put words into Wyatt's mouth because of the inarticulateness and monosyllabic way he had of talking".

The book later inspired a number of stories, movies, and television programs about outlaws and lawmen in Dodge City and Tombstone, including the 1955–1961 television series The Life and Legend of Wyatt Earp.

=== Description ===
Lake conceived the idea of a revolver that would be more precise and could be easily modified to work similarly to a rifle. According to Lake, the Colt Buntline was a single-action revolver chambered for .45 Long Colt cartridge. However, it had a 12-inch-long (305 mm) barrel, in comparison to the Colt Peacemaker's 7.5-inch (190 mm) barrel. A 16-inch (406 mm) barrel was available, as well. According to Lake, it had a removable stock that could be easily affixed through a combination of screws and lead-ins. This accessory gave the revolver better precision and range, Lake claimed, and allowed the user to fire it like a rifle. The Colt Buntline was further popularized by The Life and Legend of Wyatt Earp television series.

=== Alleged presentation to lawmen ===
Lake wrote that Ned Buntline commissioned the revolvers in 1876 and that he presented them to Wyatt Earp and four other well-known western lawmen – Bat Masterson, Bill Tilghman, Charlie Bassett, and Neal Brown. However, neither Tilghman nor Brown were lawmen at that time. According to Lake, Earp kept his pistol at the original 12-inch length, but the four other recipients of the Specials cut their barrels down to the standard 7 1/2 inches, or shorter.

Lake spent much effort trying to track down the Buntline Special through the Colt company, Masterson, and contacts in Alaska. Lake described it as a Colt Single Action Army model with a long, 12-inch (30 cm) barrel, standard sights, and wooden grips into which the name "Ned" was ornately carved. Researchers have never found any record of an order received by the Colt company, and Ned Buntline's alleged connections to Earp have been largely discredited.

=== Colt records ===
The revolver could have been specially ordered from the Colt factory in Hartford, Connecticut, as extra-long barrels were available from Colt at a dollar an inch over 7.5 inches (190 mm). Several such revolvers with 16-inch barrels and detachable stocks were displayed at the 1876 Centennial Exposition, but these were marketed as "Buggy rifles". There are no company records for the Buntline Special, nor a record of any orders from or sent to Ned Buntline. This does not absolutely preclude the historicity of the revolvers, however. Massad Ayoob writing for Guns Magazine cited notes by Josie Earp in which she mentioned an extra-long revolver as a favorite of Wyatt Earp. He cited an order by Tombstone, Arizona, bartender Buckskin Frank Leslie for a revolver of near-identical description. This order predated the O.K. Corral fight by several months.

== Replicas ==
In the 1950s, Colt resumed manufacture of the Single Action Army and made a Buntline version, due to customer demand. The barrels are marked on the left side "COLT BUNTLINE SPECIAL .45". A few third-generation Buntlines were manufactured in the late 1970s, as well. Colt manufactured 70 New Frontier Buntline Specials from 1962 to 1967 with 12-inch barrels and folding target sights, chambered in .45 Colt.

The 1873 Buntline Target is an Italian 6-shot single-action revolver chambered for the .357 Magnum or the .45 Colt cartridges, manufactured by A. Uberti, Srl. The revolver has an 18-inch barrel with no muzzle brake or ports. It comes with a walnut grip and a dark blue finish.

The Navy Arms Frontier Buntline Model is a 6-shot single-action revolver chambered for the .357 Magnum or the .45 Colt cartridges, manufactured for Navy Arms. The revolver has a 16.5-inch barrel with no muzzle brake or ports. It comes with a walnut grip and a detachable shoulder stock.

Cimarron Firearms offers a version called the Wyatt Earp Buntline styled after the one used by Kurt Russell in the 1993 movie "Tombstone" with a 10-inch barrel and a silver badge inlaid on the right grip panel.

Tex Watson used a .22-caliber Hi-Standard Longhorn revolver with a 9.5-inch barrel—commonly referred to as a "Buntline Special" due to its long barrel—but it was not a genuine Colt Buntline Special. The gun, serial number 1902708, was stolen in March 1969 from Archery Headquarters in El Monte, California. It was later given to Charles Manson by Randy Starr, who obtained it from someone named "Ron." Manson used it to shoot Bernard "Lotsapoppa" Crowe in July 1969, and then loaned it to Tex Watson for the Tate murders on August 8, 1969. Watson used the revolver to shoot and bludgeon victims Steven Parent, Jay Sebring, and Wojciech Frykowski, sustaining damage to the gun (bent ejector rod, broken grip). The weapon was tossed from a moving car after the murders and found by a 10-year-old boy Steven Weiss, on September 1, 1969.

Despite being called a "Buntline," it was a commercial .22 LR Hi-Standard model, not a Colt .45 Long Colt like the legendary (and likely mythical) Buntline Specials said to have been given to Wyatt Earp and others.
