= Frontier Marshal (1939 film) =

1939 film by Allan Dwan

- Theatrical release poster
- Directed by: Allan Dwan
- Screenplay by: Sam Hellman
- Based on: Wyatt Earp: Frontier Marshal; 1931 novel by Stuart N. Lake
- Produced by: Sol M. Wurtzel
- Starring: Randolph Scott; Nancy Kelly
- Cinematography: Charles G. Clarke
- Edited by: Fred Allen
- Color process: Black and white
- Production company: 20th Century Fox
- Distributed by: 20th Century Fox
- Release date: July 28, 1939
- Running time: 71 minutes
- Country: United States
- Language: English

Frontier Marshal is a 1939 American Western film directed by Allan Dwan and starring Randolph Scott as Wyatt Earp. The film is the second produced by Sol M. Wurtzel based on Stuart N. Lake's biography of Earp Wyatt Earp: Frontier Marshal (later found to be largely fictionalized). An earlier version was Wurtzel's Frontier Marshal, filmed in 1934. The film was remade by John Ford in 1946 as My Darling Clementine, including whole scenes reshot from the 1939 film.

Frontier Marshal costars Nancy Kelly, Cesar Romero as "Doc Halliday" (the name was changed for the film from the original "Holliday" because of fear of a lawsuit from Holliday's family), John Carradine and Lon Chaney Jr. Ward Bond appears as the town marshal; Bond was also in the 1934 version, and later appears as Morgan Earp in Ford's film. Eddie Foy Jr. plays the large supporting role of his father, entertainer Eddie Foy, in this as well as three other feature films.

== Plot ==
In Tombstone, Arizona, Carter, a saloon owner, has arranged for Indian Charlie to get drunk and shoot up a rival saloon. When the Cochise County Sheriff is unwilling to stop Indian Charlie from shooting up the saloon, a new arrival to town, Wyatt Earp, stops the carnage. Later, Earp is beaten by some of Carter's hired men for taking the law into his own hands. This prompts Earp to take the job of Town Marshal.

Dance hall girl Jerry is upset with Earp, so when her sweetheart Doc Halliday gets to town, a showdown seems imminent. Earp and Doc instead become friends. Doc's former sweetheart Sarah Allen arrives in town. Believing that he is no good for her, Doc distances himself from Sarah, but Earp convinces her that her relationship with Doc can be rekindled.

The two men work together after visiting entertainer Eddie Foy is kidnapped by Carter's men and forced to perform at his saloon. When Jerry joins forces with Carter to plan the robbery of a gold shipment, Earp and Doc foil the robbery and escape with their lives. Later, Doc is forced to perform surgery to save a young boy's life, then is ambushed and fatally shot by Curley Bill, one of Carter's men. Curly Bill then challenges Earp to a final showdown at the OK Corral. Earp avenges his friend's death and Jerry, remorseful and distraught over her part in the robbery, picks up a gun and finishes off the last of the gang. Sarah chooses to stay in Tombstone to remain close to Doc, and Jerry leaves town.

== Cast ==
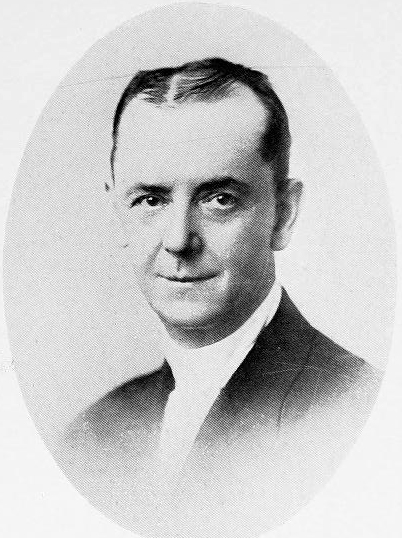
Eddie Foy, Sr.

- Randolph Scott as Wyatt Earp
- Nancy Kelly as Sarah Allen
- Cesar Romero as Doc Halliday
- Binnie Barnes as Jerry
- John Carradine as Ben Carter
- Edward Norris as Dan Blackmore
- Eddie Foy Jr. as Eddie Foy
- Ward Bond as Town Marshal
- Lon Chaney Jr. as Pringle
- Chris-Pin Martin as Pete
- Joe Sawyer as Curley Bill
- Dell Henderson as Dave Hall
- Harry Hayden as Mayor Henderson
- Ventura Ybarra as Pablo
- Charles Stevens as Indian Charlie
- Tom Tyler as Buck Newton (uncredited)

== Origins ==
The film was based on Stuart Lake's book Wyatt Earp: Frontier Marshal, published two years after Earp's death in 1929. Prior to his death, Earp and his wife Josephine ("Sadie") went to great lengths to keep Josephine's name out of the book, and she threatened litigation to prevent her name from being used in the film. In 1934, she had successfully forced the producers to excise her husband's name from the first film. In 1939, she sued 20th Century Fox for $50,000 to prevent it from producing the remake of Frontier Marshal. After agreeing to remove Wyatt Earp's name from the title and settling with Josephine Earp for $5,000, Fox released the film as Frontier Marshal.

In Los Angeles, Josephine Earp befriended many celebrities, including Cecil B. DeMille and Gary Cooper. She received part of the money earned by sales of Lake's book about her husband as well as royalties from the film.
