= Wyatt Earp: Frontier Marshal =

1931 book by Stuart N. Lake

- First American hardcover edition.
- Author: Stuart N. Lake
- Genre: Biography, later Historical fiction
- Publisher: Houghton Mifflin Company, New York
- Publication date: 1931
- Pages: 392
- ISBN: 978-0671885373
- OCLC: 31029184
- Dewey Decimal: F786 .E12

Wyatt Earp: Frontier Marshal is a 1931 biography of Wyatt Earp written by Stuart N. Lake and published by Houghton Mifflin Company. It was the first biography of Earp, written with his contributions. It established the Gunfight at the O.K. Corral in the public consciousness and conveyed an extraordinary story about Wyatt Earp as a fearless lawman in the American Old West. Earp and his wife Josephine Earp tried to control the account, threatening legal action to persuade Lake to exclude Earp's second wife from the book. When the book was published, neither woman was mentioned.

Lake's biography was adapted as the basis for at least three movies: Frontier Marshal (1934); Frontier Marshal (1939); and My Darling Clementine (1946). The 1955 television series, The Life and Legend of Wyatt Earp, was also based on Lake's book; its success made Lake into one of the first television moguls. A number of writers and researchers have been unable to document many of the stories found in the book.

== Establishes Earp's reputation ==
The Gunfight at the O.K. Corral and Wyatt Earp were relatively unknown to the American public until 1931 when Lake published his book two years after Earp's death. Lake wrote that the Earps stood for law and order and that the lawmen justifiably arrested some of the Cowboys, and when they resisted, fought the outlaws to a final finish. Lake described a showdown between Earp and Ben Thompson, who had killed Sheriff Chauncey B. Whitney in Ellsworth, Kansas. According to Lake, the remaining local lawmen were too afraid to arrest him, but Earp stepped up and intimidated Ben into surrendering. But the Ellsworth Reporter's story and Thompson's own account do not mention Earp. The newspaper reported that Deputy Sheriff Ed Hogue was the only officer remaining to make arrests. Earp's name was absent. When the first episode of The Life and Legend of Wyatt Earp aired on ABC on September 6, 1955, it retold Lake's version of the Ben Thompson incident.

Lake wrote, "Whatever else may be said of Wyatt Earp, against or for him, and no matter what his motives, the greatest gunfighter that the Old West knew cleaned up Tombstone, the toughest camp in the world." Lake turned Wyatt Earp into a "Western superman".

Lake's creative biography and later Hollywood portrayals exaggerated Wyatt's profile as a western lawman. Although his brother Virgil had far more experience as a sheriff, constable, and marshal, Wyatt, who outlived Virgil, was made famous by Lake's largely fictionalized biography, and Wyatt became the subject of and model for a large number of films, TV shows, biographies and works of fiction that continue to exaggerate his reputation and magnify his mystique.

== Book development ==
Before he wrote the book, Lake specialized in stories about the Old West. He knew Bat Masterson, who was then writing for the New York Morning Telegraph. Masterson told Lake to contact Earp for true stories about the American Old West. He sought Earp out, initially hoping to write a magazine article about him. Then in his 80s, Earp was concerned that his vantage point into history had not been captured, and he was seeking a biographer. He may also have been financially motivated as he had little income in his last years of life. Although the book is written in Earp's voice, Lake interviewed him only eight times, during which Earp sketched out the "barest facts" of his life. In this period, Josephine was trying to get her own life story published.

=== Concealed history ===
In the course of his writing, Stuart Lake learned of some aspects of Josephine's and Wyatt Earp's life that Josephine wanted to keep private. Before meeting Earp, she had been the common-law wife of Cochise County Sheriff Johnny Behan. She may have worked as a "sporting lady" or prostitute before that. Wyatt Earp arrived in Tombstone on December 1, 1879, and Josephine and Behan arrived from Tip Top, Arizona Territory in September 1880. By April 1881, Josephine had kicked Behan out for infidelity. She had built a house with money her father sent her, and in mid-1881 rented it to Dr. George Goodfellow. There are no contemporary records in Tombstone of a relationship between Josephine and Earp, but Behan and Earp both had offices above the Crystal Palace Saloon, competed for the same jobs, and were loyal to opposing social groups. Behan played a role in the Gunfight at the O.K. Corral, telling the Earps that he had disarmed the Cowboys. (Behan testified afterward that he'd only said he'd gone down to the Cowboys "for the purpose of disarming them," not that he had actually done so.)

Josephine Earp told Earp's biographers and others that Earp never owned gambling saloons and that he never offered prostitutes upstairs, but both these facts were otherwise documented. When pressed for details on her life before and during her time in Tombstone, Josephine was continually evasive.

Josephine also wanted to suppress information on Wyatt's previous common-law wife, Mattie Blaylock, a former prostitute with whom Wyatt was living until he left Tombstone in April 1882. Blaylock suffered from severe headaches and was addicted to laudanum, an opiate-based pain reliever in common use at the time. After Earp left her, she returned to prostitution and later committed suicide. During the interviews with Lake and in later correspondence, Josephine went to great lengths to keep Blaylock's and her own name out of his book. When Lake wrote Earp that he planned to send portions of the book to his New York agent, Earp objected because he wanted to read it first. Wyatt was already critically ill and died three days later on January 13, 1929.

When Wyatt died, he and Josephine had been together for 46 years. After Earp's death, she continued to work tirelessly to see that Wyatt was portrayed in a positive manner while protecting both of their reputations. Josephine wrote Lake, "It must be a nice clean story." Lake tried to reassure Josephine. He promised her in the fall of 1929 that the book would establish Earp in his "rightful place" and make her a little money as well. Josephine continued to correspond with Lake, but the author resented her interference. Josephine insisted she was simply trying to protect Earp's legacy. Lake felt she was attempting to influence what he wrote and hamper him in every way possible. Josephine may have consulted lawyers and threatened to sue Lake. When Lake wouldn't accommodate all of her demands, she traveled to Boston, Massachusetts to try to persuade the publisher to stop the release of the book. When it was released, she described it as full of "outright lies". Despite her protests, Josephine made some money from the book. Before Earp died, Lake signed a contract with Wyatt and Josephine that gave them and their heirs residual income from the book's sales. The contract was finally terminated by court order after Josephine's death in 1945.

Josephine sought to get her own life story published. She recruited the assistance of Wyatt's cousins, Mabel Earp Cason and Vinolia Earp Ackerman, to help her develop a manuscript. Josephine tried to interest several publishers in the book, but backed out several times due to their insistence that she be completely open and forthcoming, rather than slanting her memories to her favor. Mable Earp Cason says she and her sister "finally abandoned work on the manuscript because she would not clear up the Tombstone sequence where it pertained to her and Wyatt." When Josephine could not find a publisher, she changed her mind and asked the cousins to burn their work, but Cason held back a copy, which amateur historian Glenn Boyer eventually acquired the rights to.

== Publication ==
Lake initially published four excerpts from the book in The Saturday Evening Post. Lake employed a style of fictionalized dialog that was popular during the era but which is no longer accepted in biographies. The entire book was published as Wyatt Earp: Frontier Marshal on October 7, 1931, two years after Earp's death. It portrayed Earp as a "gallant white knight" and entirely avoided mentioning Josephine Earp and Mattie Blaylock. The book was immediately and immensely popular, becoming a bestseller. It drew considerable positive attention and established Lake as a writer for years to come. It also established the Gunfight at the O.K. Corral in the public consciousness and Wyatt Earp as a fearless lawman of the American Old West. Lake's biography took considerable dramatic license, depicting Earp as a dedicated, perfect lawman who could do no wrong, who always sought righteousness. Lake's story included Earp in a number of gunfights, during which he was never struck by a bullet.

=== Book's credibility ===
Lake's book was published during the Great Depression when accuracy wasn't important to the public, who were looking for escape and heroes.The book transformed Wyatt into a celluloid hero at a time when the media hungered for heroes. But shortly after its publication, other writers began to pick the book apart. Frank C. Lockwood, William MacLeod Raine, Floyd Benjamin Streeter, and Anton Mazzonovitch challenged Lake's glowing description of Earp.

Writer Burton Rascoe of the New York Herald Tribune, who wrote a biography of Belle Starr, initially admired Lake's book. He described it as "the best written, most credible, and most thoroughly absorbing of all the existent books about famous peace officers and notorious bandits," but something about the book raised his suspicions. In early 1941 he wrote Lake about his concerns, and Lake candidly responded that during his interviews Earp had been "inarticulate," that "in speech, he was at best monosyllabic." Lake said he felt "journalistically justified in inventing the Earp manuscript". Lake said his intent was to find "a method that would stamp mine [his book] as authentic. Possibly it was a form of 'cheating.' But, when I came to the task I decided to [employ] the direct quotation form sufficiently often to achieve my purpose. I've often wondered if I did not overdo in this respect." Rascoe commented, "This book may be faked from beginning to end, but I don't believe it is, and if it is, it is a magnificent job of fakery–a creative work of first-rate ingenuity, in fact."

Lake admitted many years afterward that he fabricated quotes and more when he wrote the book. Author Frank Waters published The Colorado (1985), a story supposedly written based on conversations with Allie Earp, Virgil Earp's widow. Waters recalled that Lake wrote his publishers and told them, "Wyatt never dictated a word to him, never saw a word of his writing, and died two years before the book was published." Waters denounced Wyatt Earp: Frontier Marshal as "the most assiduously concocted piece of blood-and-thunder fiction ever written".

Later researchers have suggested that Lake's account of Earp's early life is embellished, for there is little corroborating evidence for many of the book's stories. Along with Frank Waters, writers like Steve Gatto have cast doubt on the authenticity and accuracy of Lake's larger-than-life depiction of Wyatt Earp. Even the title was misleading: in his numerous positions as a lawman, Wyatt Earp had never been more than a Deputy U.S. Marshal.

A number of researchers and writers have come to regard the book as "largely fictional" and a "thundering good novel". Yale historian John Mack Faragher, an acknowledged expert in Western history, described it as "an imaginative hoax, a fabrication mixed with just enough fact to give it credibility," and a "highly imaginative account of an upright lawman who single-handedly cleaned up the worst towns on the frontier, the book became a best seller and the basis for all future Earp stories."

But a few defend Lake's work as in keeping with the era. Author Lee Silva noted that the fictionalized dialogue Lake used was an acceptable style of writing in the early 1930s.

Another defender of Lake's work is Fred Dodge who knew all the Earps and Holliday in Tombstone. His memoirs and letters were published in Under Cover for Wells Fargo edited by Lake's daughter Carolyn in 1969. Dodge worked with Lake for several years on details for Lake's book, and when finished, Lake sent him a copy of the book with a handwritten inscription. On October 26, 1931, Dodge wrote back thanking him for the book. He wrote: "As you know, until I met the Earp boys in Tombstone I knew none of them personally. . . Of couse I am thoroughly familiar with the Tombstone part of their lives. So that part of your material I know is accurate, and handled in a most masterly manner. I must congratulate you in the way you have made Wyatt to stand out from his background without in any way changing values or atmosphere. You have drawn an accurate picture of one of the coolest and bravest men I have ever known, and made it alive. It is a pity he could not have lived to see this book, which should go so far to refute the many blood and thunder stories that have been told about him. Naturally, the part that was familiar to me was of deepest interest to me - and right here I want to thank you for the way you have handled my double life in Tombstone - but the whole book is so interesting and so true that I feel that you have done a real service to my generation on the frontier."

=== Conflicting locations ===
Lake reported that Wyatt took to hunting buffalo during the winter of 1871–72, but Earp was arrested three times in the Peoria area during that period. Earp is listed in the city directory for Peoria during 1872 as a resident in the house of Jane Haspel, who operated a brothel. In February 1872, Peoria police raided the brothel, arresting four women and three men: Wyatt Earp, Morgan Earp, and George Randall. Wyatt and the others were charged with "Keeping and being found in a house of ill-fame". They were later fined twenty dollars plus costs for the criminal infraction. He was arrested for the same crime in May 1872 and late September 1872.

=== Buntline Special ===
One of the legends about Earp perpetrated by Lake was about a long-barreled revolver called the "Buntline Special", a Colt six-shooter with a 12-inch barrel. Earp was described by Lake as using this weapon to pistol-whip and disarm cowboys who resisted town ordinances against carrying of firearms. Earp's biography claimed the Specials were given to "famous lawmen" Wyatt Earp, Bat Masterson, Bill Tilghman, Charlie Bassett and Neal Brown by author Ned Buntline in return for "local color" for his western yarns. This may be inaccurate since neither Tilghman nor Brown were lawmen then. There is no conclusive proof as to the kind of pistol Wyatt carried on a regular basis, although it is known that on the day of the Fight at the O.K. Corral on October 26, 1881, Earp used a .44 caliber 1869 American model Smith & Wesson with an eight-inch barrel. Earp had received the weapon as a gift from Tombstone mayor and Tombstone Epitaph newspaper editor John Clum.

Lake spent much effort trying to track down the Buntline Special through the Colt company, Masterson, and contacts in Alaska. Lake described it as a Colt Single Action Army model with a long, 12 inches (30 cm) barrel, standard sights, and wooden grips into which the name "Ned" was ornately carved. Researchers have never found any record of an order received by the Colt company, and Ned Buntline's alleged connections to the Earps have been discredited.

Although historians such as William B. Shillingberg maintain that the Buntline was a fabrication by Lake, the revolver could have been specially ordered from the Colt factory in Hartford, Connecticut. Several revolvers with 16-inch barrels were displayed at the 1876 Centennial Exposition and over-long barrels were available from Colt at a dollar an inch over 7.5 inches (190 mm). There are no company records for the Buntline Special nor a record of any orders from or sent to Ned Buntline but this does not preclude the historicity of the revolvers. Massad Ayoob writing for Guns Magazine cited notes by Josie Earp in which she mentions an extra-long revolver as a favorite of Wyatt Earp. Ayoob cited an order by Tombstone, Arizona, bartender Buckskin Frank Leslie for a revolver of near-identical description. This order predated the O.K. Corral fight by several months.

== Film adaptations ==
Lake's book was the source for the first film about Wyatt Earp, Frontier Marshal, produced by Sol M. Wurtzel in 1934. Before the first movie was released, Wyatt Earp's widow Josephine Earp sued 20th Century Fox for $50,000 in an attempt to keep them from making the film. She said it was an "unauthorized portrayal" of Wyatt Earp. She succeeded in getting Wyatt's name completely excised from the movie. His character was renamed "Michael Wyatt," and the movie was released as Frontier Marshal.

A second version of the film using the same title Frontier Marshal starring Randolph Scott and directed by Wurtzel was produced in 1939. Josephine threatened once again to sue, but settled for $5,000.

Lake retold this same story in a 1946 book that director John Ford developed into the movie My Darling Clementine which further boosted Wyatt's reputation. It included whole scenes reshot from the 1939 film. After the movie Gunfight at the O.K. Corral was released in 1957, the shootout came to be known by that name.

Since then, Wyatt Earp and the conflict has been portrayed with varying degrees of accuracy in numerous Western films and books. The book later inspired a number of stories, movies and television programs about outlaws and lawmen in Dodge City and Tombstone, including the 1955 television series The Life and Legend of Wyatt Earp.
