= Robert H. Paul =

American sheriff (1831–1901)

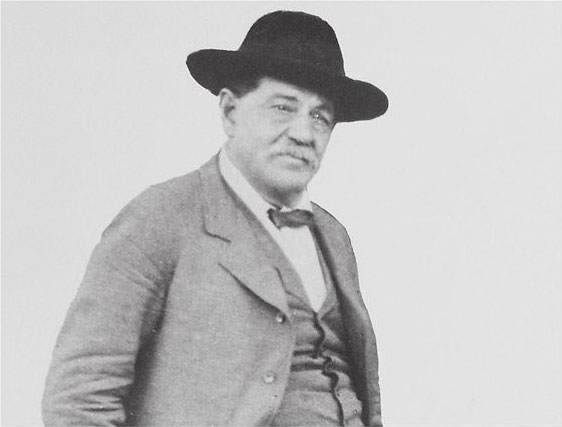
- Bob Paul, c. 1890
- Born: June 12, 1830; Lowell, Massachusetts
- Died: March 26, 1901 (aged 70); Tucson, Arizona
- Occupations: Seaman, miner, constable, sheriff
- Known for: Sheriff of Pima County
- Height: 6 ft 6 in (198 cm)
- Spouse: Margaret Coughlan

Robert Havlin Paul (June 12, 1830 – March 26, 1901) was a law enforcement officer in the American Southwest for more than 30 years. He was sheriff of Pima County, Arizona Territory, from April 1881 to 1886. He was also a friend of Deputy U.S. Marshall Virgil Earp and his brother Wyatt Earp. At 6 feet 6 inches (1.98 m) and 240 pounds (110 kg), he was described as "larger than life". Others described him as "powerful, fearless and very lucky".

== Early life ==
Paul was born in Lowell, Massachusetts, on June 12, 1830, and at age 12 (some reports say age 14) went to sea from New Bedford, Massachusetts, on the whaling ship Majestic with his older brother John. When the voyage ended two years later in the Sandwich Islands, the captain sold the cargo of whale oil and gave Paul his share, $250 (approximately $9,000 as of 2025). He shipped out as a merchant sailor for the next two years and when his ship put in at San Francisco on February 2, 1848, he left to try his luck in the California gold fields.

== Mining in California ==
Paul worked a placer mine in Hangtown for several months without success. He followed others to fresh discoveries of gold on the Yuba River and then to the Mokelumne River, where he found and worked a successful mining claim. He was first elected constable in Campo Seco in 1854, and a month later was appointed Calaveras County Deputy Sheriff for the next three years. In 1857 he was appointed undersheriff. He was responsible for breaking up the Tom Bell gang that was operating in Calaveras and Placer County.

In 1862, he married Margaret Coughlan, a 17-year-old Irish woman, in Mokelumne Hill. They had 10 children, only six of whom lived to adulthood. He tried mining again but had no luck and in the 1870s took a job as a stagecoach shotgun messenger for Wells Fargo & Co. operating out of San Andreas and later Visalia, California

He was so successful at his job with Wells Fargo that in 1878, Wells Fargo superintendent J. J. Valentine ordered Paul to Arizona to deal with a series of gold bullion robberies in Maricopa, Arizona. Paul was joined in 1879 by Al Sieber and Johnny Behan in a chase for the robber and murderer during the stage holdup near Gillette, Arizona (near present-day Tip Top, Arizona in Yavapai County).

== Pima County Sheriff election of 1880 ==
With several years of experience as a sheriff in California, Paul ran as a Republican for the office of Pima County Sheriff against incumbent Charles A. Shibell, a Democrat. Paul was expected to win, but on November 2, 1880, Shibell was unexpectedly reelected, and he immediately appointed Johnny Behan as the new deputy sheriff for the Tombstone region of Pima County. A week later, Paul accused Shibell and his supporters Ike Clanton, Curly Bill Brocius, and Frank McLaury of ballot-stuffing and filed suit in the courts.

=== Assassination attempt ===
While the election decision was being argued in the courts, Paul rejoined Wells Fargo as a shotgun messenger. On the evening of March 15, 1881, the stage-driver of the Kinnear & Company stagecoach carrying $26,000 in silver bullion (about $867,000 in today's dollars) en route from Tombstone to Benson, Arizona, took ill in Contention City and Paul took the reins and the driver's seat. Three members of the Cochise County Cowboys—Jim Crane, Harry Head, and Bill Leonard—attempted to rob the stagecoach near Drew's Station, just outside Contention City, by first stepping into the road and commanding them to "Hold!"

Immediately, Crane fired at the guard's seat, killing the popular and well-known driver Eli 'Budd' Philpot. Paul believed that this shot was meant for him because Philpot was in the shotgun messenger seat that he would normally have occupied. This would lead to theories of an assassination attempt. Paul fired his shotgun and emptied his revolver at the robbers, wounding a Cowboy later identified as Bill Leonard in the groin. In the exchange, a miner named Peter Roerig, riding in the rear dickey seat, was also killed.

Philpot's body lurched forward onto the horses and they spooked and ran off. Paul was able to bring the stage under control after about 1 mile (1.6 km) by jumping onto the tongue, at which point they had lost the robbers. Paul returned to the attempted robbery site near Drews Station and joined in with the posse on an 18-day chase that produced Luther King. King was holding the horses for the robbers and identified them by name.

=== Court decision ===
The Arizona Territorial Supreme Court ruled on his election lawsuit in Paul's favor in February, but Shibell appealed, and the decision was not confirmed until April. Paul held the position through 1886. On February 1, 1881, Cochise County was split off from Pima County, relieving him of a large and difficult territory.

== Ordered to arrest Wyatt Earp ==
Two months after the Gunfight at the O.K. Corral, on December 28, 1881, three men ambushed Virgil Earp as he walked from Schieffelin Hall back to the Cosmopolitan Hotel, where the Earps had moved for mutual support and protection. Wyatt, believing that Virgil was dying, telegraphed U.S. Marshal Crawley Dake and asked to be named as Virgil's replacement as Deputy U.S. Marshal. Dake agreed. On February 2, the Clantons were put on trial before Judge Stilwell. Ike's hat had been found at the scene and McMaster testified that he had been in Charleston the evening of the shooting. He said that when Ike learned that Virgil had survived the shooting, Ike said he "would have to go back and do the job over." However, Charleston constable George McKelvey, saloon owner J. B. Ayers and five others testified that Ike Clanton had been in Charleston and could not have taken part in the shooting. The charges were dismissed for lack of evidence.

On Saturday evening, March 18, 1882, Morgan Earp was waiting for saloon owner Bob Hatch to line up a billiards shot when two bullets were fired through the window of the back door of the saloon. Morgan was shot through the spine and died within the hour. While escorting the maimed Virgil and Morgan's remains to the train in Tucson, Deputy U.S. Marshal Wyatt Earp, Warren Earp and other deputies found Frank Stilwell lying in wait in the railyard and killed him. Tucson Justice of the Peace Charles Meyer issued arrest warrants for five of the Earps' party. The federal posse returned to Tombstone.

Meyer sent a telegram to Cochise County Sheriff Johnny Behan instructing him to arrest them. The telegraph office manager, a friend of the Earps, delayed its delivery long enough to allow the Earps and their associates to make ready to leave town Tuesday evening. Behan got the telegram in the early evening and told Wyatt he wanted to see him. Wyatt replied "Johnny, if you're not careful you'll see me once too often." Ignoring Behan, the well-armed Earp posse rode out of town the same evening of Tuesday, March 21. They headed for the woodcutting camp of Pete Spence in the South Pass in the Dragoon Mountains.

When the Cowboys suspected of maiming Virgil and assassinating Morgan Earp went free on the strength of their confederates' alibis, and due to legal technicalities, Wyatt Earp decided he had to take matters into his own hands. He formed a federal posse and sought revenge against those they held responsible.

In the next three days they killed Florentino "Indian Charlie" Cruz, Curly Bill Brocius, and Johnny Barnes. Cochise County Sheriff Johnny Behan organized a posse to pursue and arrest them, but Paul did not join in. Paul said that the posse led by Behan was mostly hostile to the Earps and that a meeting would mean bloodshed. He stated that the Earps would return to Tucson and turn themselves in. Tucson, where the Earps had killed Stilwell, was in Paul's jurisdiction, but Paul was a friend of the Earps and failed to execute the warrant.

On May 16, 1882, the sheriff of Arapahoe County, Colorado, notified Cochise County Sheriff Johnny Behan that he had Wyatt and Warren Earp in his custody, along with Doc Holliday. Behan applied to the governor for money to go to Colorado to bring the Earps back, but Governor Fremont instead gave the funds to Paul as Pima County Sheriff. Paul had received word on the same day from Denver that the sheriff there had five of the Earp party in custody. When Paul arrived in Denver, he served a warrant for Doc Holiday's arrest on charges that he killed Frank Stilwell in Tucson. Wyatt Earp, also in Denver, feared for Holiday's life if he was returned to Tombstone. He asked his friend and Trinidad, Colorado Sheriff Bat Masterson to help get Holiday released. Sheriff Masterson appealed to Governor Frederick W. Pitkin and succeeded in getting Holiday released from jail. Paul also knew of warrants for the Earp's arrest, but he was a friend of the men and never served the warrants.

== Later years ==
In April 1883, in the Old Pueblo in Tucson, local citizens attempted to lynch Joseph Casey, who earlier that day had murdered the jailer Deputy Sheriff Andrew Holbrook. Paul cleared the courthouse and almost single-handedly saved Casey's life. Paul served as Pima County sheriff until 1886.

Paul later worked as a detective for the Southern Pacific Railroad during 1888–1890. On that job, he was responsible for tracking down the robbers who held up the Stein's Pass railroad in Sonora, Mexico, in 1888.

In 1890, he was appointed by President Benjamin Harrison as U.S. Marshal for the entire Arizona Territory and held that post until 1893, after which he served as Justice of the Peace in Tucson.

Over the years, Paul's courage, omnipresent shotgun and manhunts into Mexico drew national acclaim. He died of cancer on March 26, 1901, in what his obituary called both "his first and last sickness". He was buried in Tucson's Court Street Cemetery.
