= Edward Bowers =

Edward Bowers may refer to:

- Edward Bowers (painter) (1822–1870), American painter
- Edward Charles Bowers (1845–1929), Canadian politician, teacher and trader
- Edward Franklin Bowers (1838–1879), Old West American lawman
