= Wyatt Earp (film) =

1994 film by Lawrence Kasdan

- Theatrical release poster
- Directed by: Lawrence Kasdan
- Written by: Dan Gordon; Lawrence Kasdan
- Produced by: Kevin Costner; Lawrence Kasdan; Jim Wilson
- Starring: Kevin Costner; Dennis Quaid; Gene Hackman; Jeff Fahey; Mark Harmon; Michael Madsen; Catherine O'Hara; Bill Pullman; Isabella Rossellini; Tom Sizemore; JoBeth Williams; Mare Winningham
- Cinematography: Owen Roizman
- Edited by: Carol Littleton
- Music by: James Newton Howard
- Production companies: Kasdan Pictures; Tig Productions
- Distributed by: Warner Bros.
- Release date: June 24, 1994
- Running time: 190 minutes
- Country: United States
- Language: English
- Budget: $63 million
- Box office: $55.9 million

Wyatt Earp is a 1994 American epic biographical Western drama film about the lawman of the same name. Directed by Lawrence Kasdan, who co-wrote the screenplay with Dan Gordon, the film follows Earp from his early life to his career as a marshal and his involvement in the O.K. Corral gunfight. It features an ensemble cast led by Kevin Costner as Earp, with Gene Hackman, Mark Harmon, Michael Madsen, Catherine O'Hara, Bill Pullman, Dennis Quaid, Isabella Rossellini, Tom Sizemore, JoBeth Williams, and Mare Winningham in supporting roles.

The film was developed in competition with Tombstone, another adaptation of Earp's life and the O.K. Corral gunfight that came out six months earlier. Released on June 24, 1994, Wyatt Earp received mixed reviews from critics, who praised the performances and Kasdan's direction, but criticized the three-hour runtime and unfavorably compared it to Tombstone. It was a box office failure, grossing $55.9 million on a $63 million budget.

== Plot ==
During the American Civil War, teenaged Wyatt Earp lives on his family's farm in Pella, Iowa, while his older brothers Virgil and James serve with the Union Army. Wyatt attempts to run away, intending to lie about his age and join his brothers in the war, but his father catches him. His brothers return home at the war's end, with James gravely wounded, and the family moves west to start over. Wyatt sees a man being shot dead in a duel and vomits at the sight.

Years later, a teenaged Wyatt works as a wagon driver and earns extra money by acting as a referee for boxing matches. A bully tries to shoot him after a drunken argument, but Wyatt disarms him, taking his gun. Returning home to Missouri, Wyatt marries his childhood sweetheart, Urilla Sutherland. They move into their own house, and he begins working as a lawman. Months later, his pregnant wife dies from typhoid fever. After staying by her side through the illness, Wyatt becomes deeply depressed. Burning their home and possessions, he begins drinking and drifts from town to town, landing in Pine Bluff, Arkansas. He robs a man and steals his horse but is quickly arrested. With Wyatt facing certain hanging, his father bails him out of jail, telling him to never return to Arkansas.

Working as a buffalo hunter, Wyatt befriends Bat Masterson and his brother Ed Masterson. Years pass, and Wyatt becomes a deputy marshal in Wichita, Kansas, building a reputation as a man unafraid to enforce the law. He is recruited to work for the police force in Dodge City, with a lower salary but earning extra money for every arrest. Wyatt becomes romantically involved with a prostitute, Mattie Blaylock, and persuades the Mastersons to come on as his deputies. Wyatt believes Ed is too passive, but the Dodge City council fires Wyatt for repeated complaints of excessive force, appointing Ed to take his place. Wyatt starts working for the railroad to catch robbers.

Pursuing outlaw Dave Rudabaugh, Wyatt is introduced to gunman and gambler Doc Holliday in Fort Griffin, Texas, and the two become friends. Holliday assists Earp in locating Rudabaugh, whom he dislikes tremendously. Wyatt receives word that Ed has been killed, having shot and killed both his assailants before dying in the street. Wyatt returns to Dodge City and soon after kills his first man, witnessed by actress Josie Marcus. Despite his brothers' wives' and Mattie's protests, Wyatt moves the family to Tombstone, Arizona and immediately finds himself at odds with the outlaw Cowboy gang. He becomes romantically involved with Josie Marcus, angering her boyfriend Sheriff Behan and stressing his relationship with Mattie, and becomes the subject of rumor about town.

Wyatt and his brothers Morgan and Virgil arrest several Cowboys, and Virgil assumes the post of head marshal following the murder of Fred White by Curly Bill Brocius. Tension builds between the brothers and the gang as Wyatt breaks up several altercations involving the Cowboys, particularly Ike Clanton, and Holliday swears his loyalty to Wyatt, whom he considers his only real friend. The Gunfight at the O.K. Corral makes the brothers very unpopular in town as many citizens feel that they deliberately provoked the shootout. Virgil is ambushed and wounded, and Morgan is killed. In the Vendetta Ride, Wyatt forms a posse with his friends to hunt down and take revenge against the remaining Cowboys.

Many years later, Wyatt and Josie mine for gold in Alaska. A young man on the same boat recognizes Wyatt and recounts a story in which Wyatt had saved the boy's uncle, "Tommy Behind-The-Deuce". Wyatt says to Josie, "Some people say it didn't happen that way", to which she responds, "Never mind them, Wyatt. It happened that way." An epilogue states that Holliday died six years later in a hospital in Glenwood Springs, Colorado. Members of the Clanton gang continued to die mysteriously for years after Morgan's murder. Josie and Wyatt remain together for 47 years until Wyatt died at age 80 in Los Angeles.

== Cast ==
- Kevin Costner as Wyatt Earp
  - Ian Bohen as teenage Wyatt
- Dennis Quaid as Doc Holliday
- Gene Hackman as Nicholas Porter Earp
- David Andrews as James Earp
- Linden Ashby as Morgan Earp
- Jeff Fahey as Ike Clanton
- Joanna Going as Josie Marcus
- Mark Harmon as Johnny Behan
- Michael Madsen as Virgil Earp
- Catherine O'Hara as Allie Earp
- Bill Pullman as Ed Masterson
- Isabella Rossellini as Big Nose Kate
- Tom Sizemore as Bat Masterson
- JoBeth Williams as Bessie Earp
- Mare Winningham as Mattie Blaylock
- James Gammon as Mr. Sutherland
- Rex Linn as Frank McLaury
- Randle Mell as John Clum
- Adam Baldwin as Tom McLaury
- Annabeth Gish as Urilla Sutherland
- Lewis Smith as Curly Bill Brocius
- Betty Buckley as Virginia Earp
- Alison Elliott as Lou Earp
- Todd Allen as Sherm McMasters
- MacKenzie Astin as Francis O'Rourke
- James Caviezel as Warren Earp
- Karen Grassle as Mrs. Sutherland
- John Denis Johnston as Frank Stillwell
- Téa Leoni as Sally
- John Doe as Tommy 'Behind-The-Deuce' O'Rourke
- Gabriel Folse as Billy Clanton
- Norman Howell as Johnny Ringo
- Martin Kove as Ed Ross
- Jack Kehler as Bob Hatch
- John Lawlor as Judge Spicer

== Production ==
Kevin Costner was originally involved with the film Tombstone, another film about Wyatt Earp, written by Kevin Jarre of Glory. However, Costner disagreed with Jarre over the focus of the film (he believed that the emphasis should have been on Wyatt Earp rather than the many characters in Jarre's script) and left the project, eventually teaming up with Lawrence Kasdan to produce his own Wyatt Earp project. The film was also originally meant to be a six-hour miniseries until Costner joined the cast. Costner proceeded to use his then-considerable clout to convince most of the major studios to refuse to distribute the competing film, which affected casting on the rival project.

=== Filming ===
Principal photography began on July 19 and ended on December 15, 1993.

== Soundtrack ==
Wyatt Earp
- Cover art

Soundtrack album by James Newton Howard
- Released: 1994
- Label: Warner Bros. Records

The score was composed by James Newton Howard, conducted by Marty Paich with The Hollywood Recording Musicians Orchestra and released by Warner Bros. Records in 1994. It was later re-released in 2013 in an expanded edition by La-La Land.

1. "Main Title"
2. "Home from the War"
3. "Going to Town"
4. "The Wagon Chase"
5. "Mattie Wants Children"
6. "Railroad"
7. "Nicholas Springs Wyatt"
8. "Is That Your Hat?"
9. "The Wedding"
10. "Stillwell Makes Bail"
11. "It All Ends Now"
12. "Urilla Dies"
13. "Tell Me About Missouri"
14. "The Night Before"
15. "O.K. Corral"
16. "Down by the River"
17. "Kill 'Em All"
18. "Dodge City"
19. "Leaving Dodge"
20. "Indian Charlie"
21. "We Stayed Too Long"
22. "Winter to Spring"
23. "It Happened That Way"

== Reception ==
=== Box office ===
Wyatt Earp, released six months after Tombstone, grossed $56 million on a $63 million budget, compared to Tombstone's $73 million gross on a $25 million budget. The film opened at number 4 at the US box office behind The Lion King, Speed and Wolf, grossing $7.5 million in its first weekend. Internationally, Wyatt Earp was more successful grossing $31 million, compared to Tombstone's $17 million, but this was not enough to recoup its budget, making it a box office bomb.

Later Dennis Quaid said:

"I personally thought it was too long. But I'm also really proud of it."

=== Critical reception ===
On Rotten Tomatoes, the film has a score of 33%, based on 88 reviews. The site's consensus states: "Easy to admire yet difficult to love, Wyatt Earp buries eye-catching direction and an impressive cast in an undisciplined and overlong story." On Metacritic, the film has a score of 47 out of 100 based on 20 reviews, indicating "mixed or average reviews".

Roger Ebert of the Chicago Sun-Times gave the film two out of four stars, saying: "Wyatt Earp plays as if they took Tombstone and pumped it full of hot air. It involves many of the same characters and much of the same story, but little of the tension and drama. It's a rambling, unfocused biography of Wyatt Earp..., starting when he's a kid and following his development from an awkward would-be lawyer into a slick gunslinger. This is a long journey, in a three-hour film that needs better pacing."

Todd McCarthy of Variety praised the cast and production values, but remarked: "If you're going to ask an audience to sit through a three-hour, nine-minute rendition of an oft-told story, it would help to have a strong point of view on your material and an urgent reason to relate it. Such is not the case with Wyatt Earp." Similarly, Caryn James of The New York Times complimented the film's ambition and effort to portray a more human Earp, but still felt that "the film's literal-minded approach to the hero's dark soul is one of its terrible problems. Wyatt Earp labors to turn this mythic figure into a complex man; instead it makes him a cardboard cutout and his story a creepingly slow one."

Audiences surveyed by CinemaScore gave the film a grade "B+" on scale of A to F.

=== Year-end worst-of lists ===
- 2nd – Peter Travers, Rolling Stone
- 2nd – Dan Craft, The Pantagraph
- 4th – Glenn Lovell, San Jose Mercury News
- 7th – Robert Denerstein, Rocky Mountain News
- 8th – John Hurley, Staten Island Advance
- Top 12 (Alphabetically ordered, not ranked) – David Elliott, The San Diego Union-Tribune

=== Accolades ===
Award	Category	Nominee(s)	Result
Academy Awards	Best Cinematography	Owen Roizman	Nominated
American Society of Cinematographers Awards	Outstanding Achievement in Cinematography in Theatrical Releases	Owen Roizman	Nominated
Golden Raspberry Awards	Worst Picture	Kevin Costner, Lawrence Kasdan, and Jim Wilson	Nominated
Golden Raspberry Awards	Worst Director	Lawrence Kasdan	Nominated
Golden Raspberry Awards	Worst Actor	Kevin Costner	Won
Golden Raspberry Awards	Worst Screen Combo	Kevin Costner and "any of his three wives" (Annabeth Gish, Joanna Going, and Mare Winningham)	Nominated
Golden Raspberry Awards	Worst Remake or Sequel	Kevin Costner, Lawrence Kasdan and Jim Wilson	Won
International Film Music Critics Association Awards	Best Archival Release of an Existing Score – Re-Release or Re-Recording	James Newton Howard, Dan Goldwasser, and Tim Grieving	Nominated
Spur Awards	Best Drama Script	Dan Gordon and Lawrence Kasdan	Won
Turkish Film Critics Association Awards	Best Foreign Film		18th Place

American Film Institute nominated the film in AFI's 100 Years of Film Scores

== See also ==
- Tombstone – starring Kurt Russell as Wyatt Earp, released around the same time.
- Frontier Marshal – starring Randolph Scott as Wyatt Earp, released in 1939.
- My Darling Clementine – directed by John Ford, about the lead up to and battle of the OK Corral, released in 1946.
- Gunfight at the O.K. Corral – directed by John Sturges, about the same events, released in 1957.
- Hour of the Gun – starring James Garner as Wyatt Earp, released in 1967.
