= George McKelvey (lawman) =

1880s lawman in Cochise County, Arizona

George McKelvey was a lawman in Charleston, Cochise County, Arizona during the 1880s. He is known for arresting Johnny-Behind-the-Deuce (Michael O'Rourke) on January 14, 1881, after he killed Tombstone Mill and Mining Company's chief engineer Phillip Schneider in apparent self-defense. Schneider was well-liked, and residents of Charleston formed an angry mob and threatened to lynch O'Rourke.

McKelvey put O'Rourke on a buckboard wagon and hurried towards Tombstone, 10 miles (16 km) away, pursued by the angry citizens. Charleston authorities telegraphed Tombstone Marshal Ben Sippy to let him know that McKelvey was on his way with a prisoner. In an episode that later became famous, McKelvey encountered either Virgil or Wyatt Earp on his way into Tombstone. Various versions of the story differ, but Virgil or Wyatt reportedly put O'Rourke on the back of his horse and escorted him to Vogan's Saloon. Wyatt, aided by Virgil and Marshal Ben Sippy, stood down the crowd in a nervy display that soon fed his reputation as a fearless lawman.

After the mob was calmed down, McKelvey joined a 15-man posse, including Cochise County Deputy Sheriff Johnny Behan and Marshal Ben Sippy, who guarded O'Rourke during the 10 miles (16 km) ride to Tucson.
