= Michael O'Rourke (gambler) =

Professional gambler of the Old West

- Born: 1862
- Died: 1882[?]
- Other names: Mike, Johnny O'Rourke, Johnny-Behind-the-Deuce
- Occupation: Gambler

Michael O'Rourke (1862 – 1882[?]), aka "Johnny O'Rourke" or "Johnny-Behind-the-Deuce", was a professional gambler of the Old West. While living in Charleston, Arizona, he killed Henry Schneider, a popular mine engineer, in what O'Rourke said was self-defense. But citizens were aroused and threatened to lynch O'Rourke. Constable George McKelvey took O'Rourke to Tombstone, chased by the angry mob. Once there, Deputy U.S. Marshal and Tombstone Police Chief Virgil Earp, his brother Wyatt, Cochise County Sheriff Johnny Behan, and others saved him from the crowd.

== Life in Tombstone ==
O'Rourke first surfaced in Tucson when he was 16, where he developed into a talented poker player. He was often accused of cheating, but more often than not his accusers recanted in view of his reputation for being good with a gun and fast on the draw. There is evidence that O'Rourke had a fast temper and was prone to altercations, but none to support his having been in any gunfights. He relocated to the rough town of Charleston, a stamp mill town of about 200 individuals 9 miles (14 km) southwest of Tombstone on the San Pedro River.

=== Murder of Henry Schneider ===
In Charleston on January 14, 1881, O'Rourke got into a confrontation with Henry Schneider, chief engineer of the Tombstone Mining and Milling Company. Reports on the event vary. Some report that O'Rourke played poker all night with Schneider, who was losing badly, and the men argued. Schneider pulled a knife and O'Rourke shot and killed him. Another version, reported by The Tombstone Epitaph stated that someone had stolen several articles from Schneider's cabin, and "Johnny-Behind-the-Deuce" was one of those suspected. Unable to provide sufficient proof, no arrest was made, and Schneider was left mad. At noon the next day Schneider went to a restaurant for lunch, where he had a disagreement with "Johnny-Behind-the-Deuce". O'Rourke took offense at Schneider's comments and threatened him, saying, "Goddamn you, I'll shoot you when you come out." According to O'Rourke and two friends of his, Schneider produced a knife and O'Rourke shot him in self-defense.

Charleston's constable George McKelvey soon arrived and arrested O'Rourke. Schneider was well-liked, and residents of Charleston formed an angry mob and threatened to lynch O'Rourke. McKelvey put O'Rourke on a buckboard wagon and began the 10 miles (16 km) trip to Tombstone. Outlaw Cowboys Curly Bill Brocius and John Ringo encouraged talk of a lynching and led other men who pursued the wagon. Charleston authorities telegraphed Tombstone Marshal Ben Sippy to let him know that McKelvey was on his way with a prisoner.

McKelvey got to the outskirts of Tombstone and the Last Chance Saloon just ahead of the mob, where they were met by Deputy U.S. Marshal Virgil Earp, who was off duty, exercising a favorite horse of Wyatt's named Dick Naylor that had recently been recovered after being stolen by Billy Clanton.

McKelvey told Earp that the mob on his tail was aiming to lynch O'Rourke, and Earp put O'Rourke on his horse, reaching Tombstone before the mob. Assistant City Marshal Morgan Earp then took the prisoner to Vogan's Bowling Alley (a long defensible structure made of brick, situated on Allen Street), while his brother, former Pima County Deputy Sheriff Wyatt Earp pulled out a shotgun and held off the crowd, convincing them to disperse.

According to the Tombstone Epitaph, a confrontation ensued.

In a few minutes Allen street was jammed with an excited crowd, rapidly augmented by scores from all directions. By this time Marshal Sippy, realizing the situation at once, in the light of the repeated murders that have been committed and the ultimate liberty of the offenders [referring to Curly Bill Brocius' recent release], had secured a well armed posse of over a score of men to prevent any attempt on the part of the crowd to lynch the prisoner; but feeling that no guard would be strong enough to resist a justly enraged public long, procured a light wagon in which the prisoner was placed, guarded by himself, Virgil Earp and Deputy Sheriff Behan, assisted by a strong posse well armed. Moving down the street, closely followed by the throng, a halt was made and rifles leveled on the advancing citizens, several of whom were armed with rifles and shotguns. At this juncture, a well known individual with more averdupois than brains, called to the officers to turn loose and fire in the crowd. But Marshal Sippy's sound judgment prevented any such outbreak as would have been the certain result, and cool as an iceberg he held the crowd in check. No one who was a witness of yesterday's proceedings can doubt that, but for his presence, blood would have flown freely. The posse following would not have been considered; but, bowing to the majesty of the law, the crowd subsided and the wagon proceeded on its way to Benson with the prisoner, who by daylight this morning was lodged in the Tucson jail.

After the mob was calmed down, O'Rourke was escorted by a 15-man posse, including Cochise County Deputy Sheriff John Behan, Constable George McKelvey, Wyatt Earp, and Marshal Ben Sippy, who guarded him during the 10 miles (16 km) ride to Benson, where they caught the train to Tucson. But O'Rourke escaped from jail on April 18, 1881. On May 13, the Epitaph reported that Johnny-Behind-the-Deuce had been seen three days ago in the Dragoon Mountains. "He was well mounted and equipped, and was on the eve of departure for Texas. The climate of Arizona, he said, did not agree with him." He was indicted by the Grand Jury on May 19 but never stood trial for the miner's murder.

There is no direct evidence that Earp ever pulled a shotgun or put the prisoner on his horse. He is not named in the record of the incident, although it was likely he was part of the twenty man posse assembled to protect O'Rourke. There is also no evidence that Curly Bill Brocius or John Ringo ever encouraged the lynching.

Outlaw Pony Diehl later claimed he had killed gambler and Earp supporter Michael O'Rourke in 1882. According to Fred Dodge, Frank Leslie told him that O'Rourke shot Ringo in the head and tried to make it look like suicide. Diehl was a good friend of Johnny Ringo. Those who understood the tensions between the parties never doubted he had killed O'Rourke.

== Film discrepancies ==
In the movie Wyatt Earp, a character based on O'Rourke is called Tommy "Behind the Deuce" O'Rourke, played by actor/musician John Doe. A fictionalized account of the events surrounding O'Rourke’s being saved from the mob is recounted when one of O'Rourke's nephews recognizes Earp and his wife Josie, aboard a ship off the coast of Alaska in the late 1890s. In the film, O'Rourke's nephew claims that with O’Rourke locked in a cell, Wyatt calmly confronted the mob alone, addressing the crowd at gun point. No mention of O’Rourke’s escape and subsequent disappearance is made and in response to Earp’s inquiry as to O’Rourke’s fate, his nephew says he was killed in Omaha in 1887. Though an inaccurate re-telling of events, after the nephew departs, Earp comments to his wife that there are those who claim the story went differently.

== See also ==
- List of fugitives from justice who disappeared
- List of unsolved deaths
