= Crawley P. Dake =

American lawman (1836–1890)

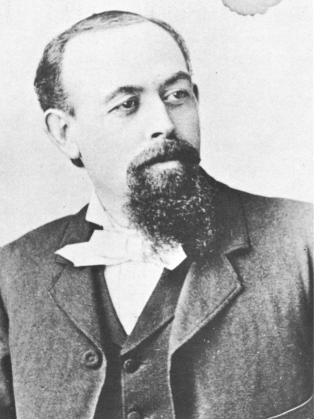
- Crawley P. Dake
- Born: September 15, 1836; Kemptville, Ontario, Canada
- Died: April 9, 1890 (aged 53); Prescott, Arizona Territory, United States
- Occupations: U.S. Marshal, business owner, miner
- Years active: 1878–1882
- Spouse: Catherine E. Smith

Crawley P. Dake (September 15, 1836 – April 9, 1890) was a lawman and business owner best known for having served as the U.S. Marshal for the Arizona Territory from 1878 to 1882, during a time of notorious lawlessness in frontier towns like Tombstone. A veteran of the American Civil War, Dake was noted for his creativity and for his frequent deputizing of civilian posses after the Posse Comitatus Act of 1878 was passed.

== Early life ==
Dake was born at Kemptville, Ontario, Canada on September 15, 1836. His family moved to Ogdensburg, New York when he was a child.

== Adult life ==
As a young man, Dake moved from New York to Michigan in 1855 and opened a retail store. He held public office and ran unsuccessfully for Congress. Dake married Catherine E. Smith of Romeo, Michigan. The union produced one son.

=== Civil War service ===
When the United States Civil War broke out, Dake raised a company of soldiers and was commissioned in the 5th Michigan Cavalry. His regiment served in the defenses of the capital until June 1863, when it joined the Cavalry Corps of the Army of the Potomac. Over the next month, the 5th Michigan Cavalry took part in several major battles, including the Battle of Hanover on June 30, the Battle of Gettysburg from July 1 to July 3, and the Battle of Williamsport from July 6 to July 14. The regiment then participated in a series of smaller engagements followed by the Battle of Mine Run from November 26 to December 2. Dake was seriously wounded in the leg and retired as a major in August 1864.

== U.S. Marshal ==
After leaving military service, he served briefly as chief deputy marshal in Detroit and for the U.S. Internal Revenue Service. When Dake was appointed on June 12, 1878 as the U.S. Marshal for the Arizona Territory, Territorial Governor John P. Hoyt objected, but Michigan's Washington delegation prevailed.

=== Robberies ===
Early in his tenure Dake faced an epidemic of stage robberies. In May 1877, the Arizona Miner of Prescott complained that the stage robberies were now as frequent as had "Indian murders" during prior years. Associate Justice Charles Silent wrote the attorney general, telling him "this lawlessness... is paralyzing business." Dake observed that the robberies "have caused much inconvenience... to the businessman."

Dake brought two men with him to set up the books and procedures to run the marshal's office effectively. He established a bonds program with the assistance of influential figures. He appointed eight deputies but found himself limited by the availability of funds to pursue outlaws. He was hampered by a federal law that required him to ask for special funds each time he wanted to pursue highway robbers, which on the east coast of the United States was rare, but which was unfortunately common in the Arizona Territory. Dake lost valuable hours waiting for replies to his telegrams and the bandits were able to flee into the mountains and even into Mexico.

Exasperated, Dake finally refused to wait for permission in September 1878 when bandits robbed a stagecoach. Even though he was not authorized, he posted a $500 reward. Though successful, his pleas for additional funds were ignored by the Washington, D.C. attorney general. But by the fall of 1878, Dake, territorial authorities, and even the Mexican government began to work together in fighting the bandits. Dake sent deputies into Mexico without permission to pursue robbers who had stolen 500 pounds (230 kg) of silver bullion.

=== Murder of Deputies Adams and Finley ===
At the behest of Judge Charles Silent, Dake deputized John Adams and Cornelius Finley. While traveling north to company headquarters in September 1878, less than two weeks after they were deputized, five Mexicans intercepted Adams and Finley, who they believed were carrying gold ore, and killed them, but didn't find any ore. One of the suspects in their killing was Florentino Saiz, who the Arizona Weekly Star identified as "the 1878 murderer of Deputy U.S. Marshals Cornelius Finley and John Hicks Adams on September 2, 1878". During the Coroner's Inquest into the death of Morgan Earp, Pete Spence's wife, Marietta Duarte, implicated her husband and four other men, including Florentino Cruz, in Morgan's murder. Saiz and Cruz may have been the same person. In 1879, the Mexican federal government refused to allow Dake to extradite two of the suspects. Unable to find justice in the courts for his brother's murder, Wyatt Earp began a vendetta, and killed Florentino Cruz on March 22, 1882 at a wood camp near South Pass of the Dragoon Mountains.

=== Struggles for federal support ===
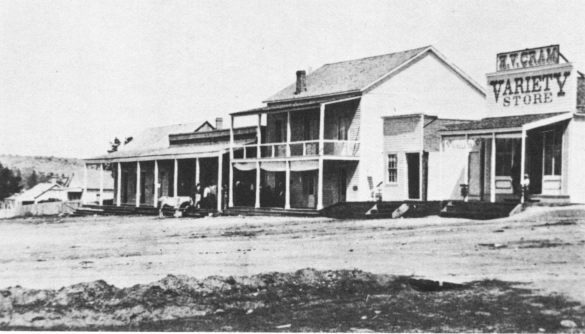
The U.S. Marshal's Office on North Cortez Street in Prescott, Arizona Territory, in May 1877.

Dake and others in the still rural Western territories pleaded with Washington for the means to pursue the bandits in their areas. Despite the presence of several hundred federal troops in Arizona, the federal Posse Comitatus Act restricted the use by the marshal of federal troops in pursuing criminals. When Union Pacific Railroad President Jay Gould complained in Washington D.C. about train robbers, the President's cabinet finally met and decided that federal troops could be used to patrol and protect government property, but not pursue outlaws. In 1879, Congress neglected to budget any money to the federal Marshal service, and Dake was forced to use his remaining funds to prosecute those he already had in custody.

=== Deputizes Virgil Earp ===
On November 27, 1879, Dake deputized Virgil Earp to help resolve ongoing problems with the so-called Cowboys in eastern Pima County. In an interview after he left the area, Virgil said, "The first stage that went out of Prescott toward Tombstone was robbed. Robberies were frequent and became expensive." Dake was criticized when he was unable to resolve a long-simmering feud between the Earps and the Cowboys in the newly formed Cochise County and for Virgil Earp's participation in the resulting Gunfight at the O.K. Corral on October 26, 1881. The acting attorney general ordered Dake to take action against the Cowboy faction, but Dake was replaced by Zara T. Tidball less than six months later, in July 1882.

== Later life and death ==
Dake knew a number of well-known Old West characters, including Leslie Blackburn, Virgil and Wyatt Earp, Joseph Evans, Joe Phy and others. Dake was heavily criticized and ultimately replaced after the Gunfight at the O.K. Corral, and was charged three years later with misappropriating funds but was later cleared. By late 1888, illness confined him to his home. Dake died in Prescott, Arizona Territory on April 9, 1890.

Police appointments
Preceded by Wiley W. Standefer	U.S. Marshal for the Arizona Territory; June 12, 1878–July 17, 1882	Succeeded by Zan L. Tidball
