= Edward Bowers (painter) =

Edward Bowers Career

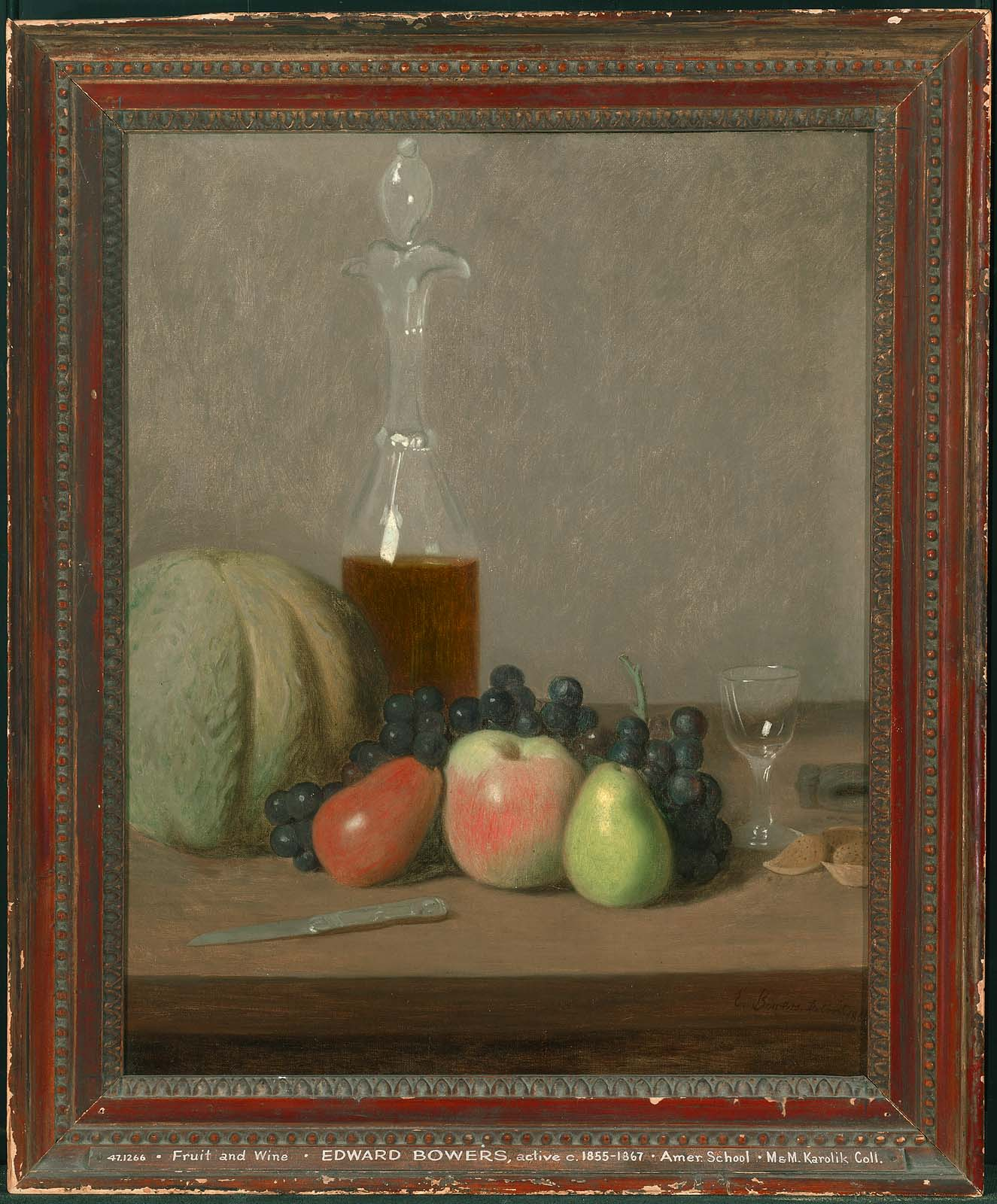
Fruit and Wine by Edward Bowers

Edward Bowers (1822-1870) was an American painter of genre scenes, landscapes, and portraits.

Bowers was born in Maryland, and in Baltimore created his early paintings including Italian Peasant, The Monk, and Teaching Young Vampa to Read. By 1854 he resided in Philadelphia, exhibiting at the Pennsylvania Academy of Fine Arts from 1856 to 1860, at the Washington, D.C. Art Association in 1857, and at the New York's Artists' Fund Society in 1860 and 1861. He returned to Baltimore in 1860 or 1861, was drafted into the Union Army in 1863, and mustered out in 1865, after which he returned to Baltimore where he opened a studio on the 100 block of East Monument Street. From 1865 to 1867 Bowers spent time in Detroit, and exhibited at the Maryland Historical Society in 1868.

In 1861 Bowers was elected to the National Academy of Design. His work is collected in the Museum of Fine Arts, Boston, the Historical Society of Pennsylvania, and Johns Hopkins University. His painting, Fruit and Wine (1865) in Boston is his best known work.
