= Edward Franklin Bowers =

Old West American lawman (1838–1879)

- Edward Franklin Bowers, 1878
- Born: Edward Franklin Bowers; June 27, 1838; Greenfield, New Hampshire, U.S.
- Died: January 5, 1879 (aged 40); Prescott, Arizona Territory, U.S.
- Occupation: Sheriff
- Years active: 1874–1878

Edward Franklin Bowers (June 27, 1838 – January 5, 1879) was an Old West American sheriff, lawman and Deputy United States Marshal in the United States Marshals Service in Yavapai County, Arizona Territory, from 1874 to 1878.

== Early life and family ==
Edward Franklin Bowers was born in Greenfield, New Hampshire, in 1838, the 11th of 12 children born to Herbert Bowers (1793–1860) and Phoebe Taylor Bowers (1796–1874). As a child, Bowers was bound out to a nearby family to work on their farm and did not live at home after the age of 12. He left home at age 19 headed to Kansas, California and Arizona. Edward's father Herbert Bowers was a stonemason in Greenfield and died of consumption in 1860 when Edward was 22 years old.

Many of Bowers' siblings were pioneers who settled in California in 1849, Colorado (Kansas Territory) in 1859 and Arizona Territory in 1864 following the discovery of gold in California in 1848. Three of his brothers, Benjamin Dexter Bowers (1820–1876), Herbert Bowers (1822–1873) and John Taylor Bowers (1826–1907), came to California by covered wagon, arriving in August 1849, and were among the first settlers of what is now Nevada City, California. John Taylor Bowers later was a noted vigilante, or member of the San Francisco Committee of Vigilance. Edward's brother Nathan Barker Bowers (1830–1906) came to Arizona Territory in 1864 and was granted Homestead Entry No. 1 as the first grantee of a homestead in Arizona authorized by the Homestead Act of 1862. Edward's brother George Washington Bowers (1829–1893) came to the area of future Denver in 1859, was the first office-holding public official of Park County, Jefferson Territory, before the Colorado Territory was organized, came to Arizona Territory in 1865 and became quite wealthy from mines in California and Arizona. George's fortunes dramatically increased from the gold production at the Harqua Hala mines near Prescott, Arizona, including the production of the largest gold brick ever processed at the San Francisco Mint, weighing 309 pounds (140 kg).

Edward Bowers left Greenfield, New Hampshire, at age 19 in 1858 and first traveled to Kansas Territory and then to Colorado Territory in 1859, where he engaged in mining and prospecting, principally in the area of Tarryall. He moved to California in 1862 and was a miner for three years. In 1865, Bowers moved to Yavapai County, Arizona Territory, with his brother Herbert.

In 1869, Bowers married Olive Joan Ehle "Ollie" (1851 – 1943) in Prescott, and they eventually had four children in Skull Valley, near Prescott. Bowers and Ehle had first met in Tarryall when Bowers was 22 and Ehle was only 11. Olive Ehle's family came to Prescott in 1864 from the Denver area when she was thirteen and were among the earliest settlers of Prescott. In 1872, Bowers was appointed the 3rd Postmaster of Skull Valley.

== Law enforcement career ==
Bowers ran unsuccessfully for sheriff of Yavapai County in 1872 but was elected in 1874 and 1876, running as a candidate of the People's Party and serving a total of four years. He was also appointed a Deputy U.S. Marshal in 1878.

His service as sheriff included many stories of cattle thieves, shootouts and murder, one case resulting in the first execution by hanging in Yavapai County, in 1875.

In October 1877, Bowers deputized Virgil Earp to help in a posse organized to capture two men who had been shooting up saloons in Prescott. In the ensuing shootout, Earp shot one man and killed him so suddenly that he was found dead with a cigarette still hanging from his mouth. Earp was deputized by Bowers four years before the famous Gunfight at the O.K. Corral. When asked why he would risk his life to capture desperadoes when he had a wife and children, Bowers said, "I am sworn to do my duty, which is to disarm and arrest those men, and I can take no other course."

Bowers' son, Edward F. Bowers Jr., was Undersheriff of Maricopa County, Arizona, and was killed in the line of duty in 1921.

Edward Franklin Bowers died in early January 1879 at the age of 40 of pneumonia contracted from one of his last acts as sheriff of Yavapai County, just days after his term had ended. Both houses of the Arizona Territory state legislature as well as the Supreme Court adjourned for the day to allow attendance at Bowers' funeral in Prescott.

Police appointments
Preceded by Henry M. Herbert	Sheriff of Yavapai County, Arizona Territory; January 1, 1875–December 31, 1878	Succeeded by John R. Walker
