= Alfredo Carrillo =

Paraguayan swimmer

Personal information
- Born: 1 September 1976 (age 49)

Sport
- Sport: Swimming

Alfredo Carrillo (born 1 September 1976) is a Paraguayan swimmer. He competed in the men's 50 metre freestyle event at the 1996 Summer Olympics.
