= Ben Sippy =

Arizona Territory law officer (fl. 1880-1881)

- Occupations: City Marshal, Tombstone, Arizona Territory
- Years active: November 12, 1880 to June 6, 1881

Ben Sippy was City Marshal of Tombstone, Arizona Territory, from November 12, 1880, to June 6, 1881. He beat out Deputy U.S. Marshal Virgil Earp for the office but left under a cloud of financial impropriety.

Before arriving in Arizona, Sippy had been indicted for theft in Parker County, Texas. He fled the state without facing the charges. On November 12, 1880, Sippy beat Virgil Earp by 311 to Earp's 259 votes in an election only two weeks after Earp was appointed to fill the office after Fred White was killed by Curly Bill Brocius. On January 4, 1881, Sippy stood for election as the permanent City Marshal and beat challenger Howard Lee.

On February 28, 1881, at the Oriental Hotel, gamblers Luke Short and Charlie Storms had a verbal altercation which was temporarily defused by Bat Masterson, who was an acquaintance of Storms as well. Storms later returned to the scene and yanked Short off the sidewalk as he and Masterson left the gambling hall. Storms pulled his cut-off Colt .45 pistol, but Short was quicker. Short shot Storms twice before he hit the ground; the first shot fired was so close that it set fire to Storms' shirt. Short was alleged to have then turned to Bat Masterson and stated: "You sure pick some of the damnedest friends, Bat." Sippy arrested Short, but the shooting was determined to have been made in self-defense.

The city council reprimanded him for being absent without leave. In May, they criticized him for "action in regard to releasing certain prisoners". He also helped defuse a lot-jumping confrontation in December 1880. Sippy was praised for his handling of the mob intent on lynching Johnny Behind the Deuce, on January 14, 1881, helping to convince them to disperse.

But by June 1881 Sippy was in trouble. On June 6, 1881, he asked the city for a two-week leave of absence and Virgil Earp was appointed as acting city marshal. Angry creditors came forward, complaining Sippy owed them money. On June 22, during Sippy's absence, Tombstone was hit by a large fire. Earp ably managed the disarray and kept lot jumpers at bay. Less than a week later, the City of Tombstone discovered $3,000 in financial improprieties in Sippy's records. Earp was appointed as Chief of Police.

Police appointments
Preceded by Virgil Earp	City Marshal of Tombstone, Arizona; November 12, 1880–June 18, 1881	Succeeded by Virgil Earp
