= Virgil Earp =

American Old West figure (1843–1905)

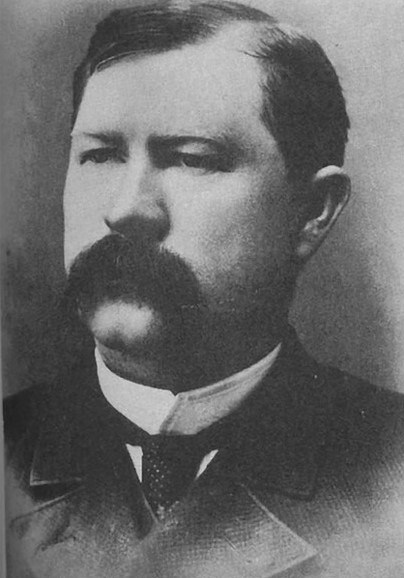
- Born: Virgil Walter Earp; July 18, 1843; Hartford, Kentucky, U.S.
- Died: October 19, 1905 (aged 62); Goldfield, Nevada, U.S.
- Occupations: Union soldier, lawman, farmer, rail construction, stagecoach driver, sawyer, mailman, prospector, saloon-keeper
- Military Service
- Allegiance: United States
- Branch: Union Army
- Service years: 1862-65
- Rank: Private
- Unit: 83rd Illinois Infantry
- Conflicts: American Civil War: Battle of Dover
- Known for: Deputy U.S. Marshal, Tombstone, Arizona, and the Gunfight at the O.K. Corral
- Spouses: Magdalena Rysdam; Rosella Dragoo; Alvira "Allie" Earp (common-law wife)
- Children: 1
- Parent(s): Nicholas Porter Earp and his second wife, Virginia Ann Cooksey
- Relatives: Wyatt, Morgan, Newton, Mariah Ann, James, Martha, Warren, Virginia Ann, and Douglas Earp

Virgil Walter Earp (July 18, 1843 – October 19, 1905) was an American lawman. He was both deputy U.S. marshal and the city marshal of Tombstone, in the Arizona Territory when he led his younger brothers Wyatt and Morgan, and Doc Holliday, in a confrontation with outlaw Cowboys at the Gunfight at the O.K. Corral on October 26, 1881. They killed brothers Tom and Frank McLaury and Billy Clanton. All three Earp brothers had been the target of repeated death threats made by the Cowboys who were upset by the Earps' interference in their illegal activities. All four lawmen were charged with murder by Ike Clanton, who had run from the gunfight. During a month-long preliminary hearing, Judge Wells Spicer exonerated the men, concluding their actions were legally justified.

However, two months later on December 28, friends of the slain outlaws retaliated, ambushing Virgil. They shot him in the back, hitting him with three shotgun rounds, shattering his left arm and leaving him permanently maimed. The Cowboys suspected were let off for lack of evidence. His brother Morgan Earp was assassinated in March 1882. Charges against those suspected were dismissed on a technicality. Wyatt Earp, appointed as deputy U.S. Marshal to replace Virgil, concluded he could not rely on civil justice and decided to take matters into his own hands. Wyatt assembled a federal posse that included their brother Warren Earp and set out on a vendetta to kill those they felt were responsible. Virgil left Tombstone to recuperate from his wounds in Colton, California, where his parents lived.

Virgil married before he left to serve in the Union Army during the American Civil War. When he returned, his wife and child had left. He held a variety of other jobs throughout his life, though he primarily worked in law enforcement. His younger brother Wyatt, who spent most of his life as a gambler, became better known as a lawman because of writer Stuart N. Lake's fictionalized 1931 biography Wyatt Earp: Frontier Marshal and later portrayals of him in movies and fiction as Old West's "toughest and deadliest gunmen of his day." In 1898, Virgil learned that his first wife Ellen Rysdam and their daughter were living in Oregon and reestablished contact with them. After suffering from pneumonia for six months, Virgil died on October 19, 1905.

== Early life ==
Virgil Earp was born in Hartford, Kentucky, the second son of Nicholas Earp and Virginia Ann Cooksey.

=== Marriage to Ellen Rysdam ===
In February 1860, while living in Pella, Iowa, 16-year-old Virgil eloped with 17-year-old Dutch immigrant Magdalena C. "Ellen" Rysdam (October 25, 1842, in Utrecht, Netherlands – May 3, 1910, in Cornelius, Oregon). One report states that they saw each other only occasionally and kept their marriage secret until Ellen was about to deliver their first child. When her parents Gerrit Rysdam and Magdalena Catrina Van Velzen learned of the marriage, they were furious, as they preferred that she marry a man who was also Dutch. Virgil's father thought he was too young to marry. Both parents wanted to get the marriage annulled. One source reports that Rysdam was successful, but another says her father failed because Virgil and Ellen refused to reveal where they had been married. They also claimed they had used false names, which would have made the marriage invalid in any case.

Virgil and Ellen remained together for a year in spite of his and her parents' disapproval. On July 26, 1861, Virgil enlisted at age 18 in the Union Army. Ellen had a daughter named Nellie Jane, born January 7, 1862 or in July 1862. Virgil was mustered in to the Illinois Volunteer Infantry for three years on September 21, 1862.

=== Civil War service ===
Virgil enlisted as a private in Company C of the 83rd Illinois Infantry on July 26, 1862, and mustered into service on August 21. The 83rd fought at the Battle of Dover and then was primarily on garrison duty in Tennessee. Virgil was court-martialed for a minor offense and docked two weeks pay as punishment.

In the summer of 1863 while Virgil was on active duty, Ellen's father told her that Virgil had been killed in Tennessee. In early 1864, Ellen married a Dutch man named John Van Rossum, and in May of that year they joined a large group who relocated from Pella, Iowa, to the Oregon Territory.

When Virgil was discharged from the military on June 26, 1865, he returned to Iowa but could not find his wife and daughter. He hired on at a local farm and helped operate a grocery store, before leaving for California to join the rest of the Earp family. In 1868, Nicholas Earp took the family east again, eventually settling in Lamar, Missouri. On August 28, 1870, Virgil married Rosella Dragoo (born in France in 1853) in Lamar. His father as justice of the peace married them, but there are no further records of Rosella.

=== Allie Sullivan ===
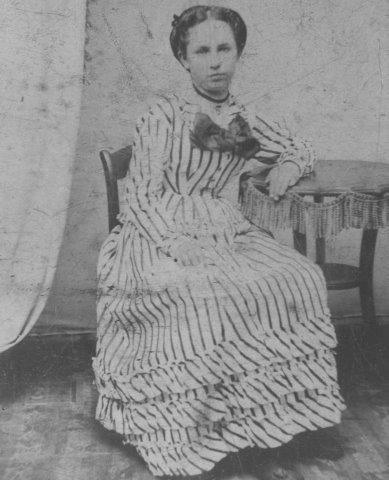
Alvira "Allie" P Sullivan, Virgil Earp's future wife, at age 16. They met in Council Bluffs, Iowa, in 1874, when she was 25

Virgil later met Alvira "Allie" Sullivan from Florence, Nebraska, in 1874. She was a waitress at the Planter's House Hotel in Council Bluffs, Iowa. They never married but remained together the rest of his life. During the remainder of his life, Virgil worked at a variety of jobs, including peace officer, farmer, rail construction in Wyoming, stagecoach driver, sawmill sawyer in Prescott, Arizona Territory, mailman, and later in life, prospector. The Earp brothers were close and often moved together, seeking a better life. Virgil spent time in Dodge City, Kansas, in 1877 with his younger brother Wyatt. Although there is no record of Virgil ever holding any law enforcement position there, Allie claimed he briefly worked as a deputy town marshal with Wyatt.

=== Arrival in Arizona ===
From Dodge City, Virgil and Allie arrived in Yavapai County, Arizona, in July 1877. Virgil lived in Camp Verde, Arizona, where he first delivered mail and drove passengers between Camp Verde and Prescott on the Star Line stage. By October 1877 Virgil and Allie had moved to Prescott, Arizona, where he later owned a woodcutting business outside of town.

On October 16, 1877, U.S. Marshal Wiley Standifer, Yavapai County Sheriff Edward Franklin Bowers, Prescott Constable Frank Murray, Virgil Earp, and Colonel William Henry McCall attempted to arrest John Tallos and accused murderer George Wilson. While the others rode on horseback or carriages, Virgil ran on foot after the posse that pursued the two men to the edge of town, where a gun fight broke out. Virgil spotted one of the two men under a tree, reloading his pistol. Using a Winchester rifle from a distance, Virgil shot him through the head, killing him.

Virgil was shortly afterwards offered a job as a driver for Patterson, Caldwell & Levally, a local freight company, during which he met John J. Gosper, Secretary of the Arizona Territory. Gosper was acting Governor in the place of Governor John C. Frémont, who was frequently absent. When Crawley Dake was appointed U.S. Marshal, he and Virgil became friends. In 1878, Virgil was appointed as Prescott's night watchman, which paid $75 a month.

In November 1878, he was elected as constable for Prescott, for which he received fees for serving summonses, subpoenas, writs and warrants. While constable, Virgil wrote his brother Wyatt about the opportunities in the silver-mining boomtown of Tombstone. In September 1879, Wyatt resigned as assistant marshal in Dodge City. Accompanied by his common-law wife Mattie Blaylock, his brother Jim and his wife Bessie, they left for Las Vegas in the New Mexico Territory. There they were reconnected with Doc Holliday and his common-law wife Kate Horony, who had been running a gambling business until the territorial legislature banned gambling. Virgil and his wife met the others in Prescott.

== Appointed deputy U.S. marshal ==
With Virgil leaving for Tombstone, U.S. Marshal Crawley Dake appointed him as deputy U.S. marshal for the Tombstone District of Pima County on November 27, 1879. He was instructed by Dake to help resolve ongoing problems with outlaw Cowboys. But the job did not pay much. He was mostly on call helping county and city officials.

In an interview after he left Tombstone, Virgil said that "The first stage that went out of Prescott toward Tombstone was robbed. Robberies were frequent and became expensive." Virgil and his brothers Wyatt and Jim and their wives arrived together in Tombstone on December 1, 1879.

=== Tombstone City marshal ===
On October 30, 1880, after town marshal Fred White was accidentally shot and killed by outlaw and gunman "Curly Bill" Brocius, Virgil was appointed acting town marshal of Tombstone. Virgil now held both the more powerful local town marshal position and the prestigious federal law enforcement appointment. As town marshal, Virgil earned a regular salary of $100 a month plus a percentage of city taxes he collected.

But Virgil did not hold the job for long. The city held a special election on November 13, and Tombstone city policemen James Flynn and Ben Sippy competed for the job. But then Flynn dropped out of the race and Sippy beat Virgil for the office, 311 votes to Earp's 259. On January 4, 1881, the city held its first regular election, and Virgil lost to Sippy once again.

However, Sippy was known to be in financial trouble. He requested a two-week leave of absence on June 6, 1881, and never returned. The city council once again appointed Virgil as temporary city marshal. On June 22, the center section of Tombstone was devastated by a fire. Virgil kept looting under control and chased off lot jumpers who tried to take over property. On June 28, it was learned that Sippy had left about $3,000 in bad debt and financial improprieties in his office. Virgil was appointed by Tombstone Mayor John Clum as the permanent city marshal and paid $150.00 per month.

=== Conflict with Cowboys ===
To reduce crime in Tombstone, the city council enacted an ordinance in April 1881 that prohibited anyone from carrying a deadly weapon in town. Everyone was required to deposit their weapons at a livery or saloon soon after entering town. A long-simmering feud between the Earps and some of the Cowboys played a big role in a gunfight that broke out when Virgil decided to enforce the ordinance on Wednesday, October 26, 1881.

Virgil was told by several concerned citizens that several Cowboys, who had been threatening the Earps for several months, were in town and armed in violation of the ordinance. Assisted by his deputy Morgan Earp and temporary deputies Wyatt Earp and John "Doc" Holliday, Virgil went to disarm Frank and Tom McLaury, Ike and Billy Clanton, and Billy Claiborne. That confrontation turned into a shootout now known as the Gunfight at the O.K. Corral.

=== Gunfight at the O.K. Corral ===
Modern media depictions of Wyatt Earp made him into a legend. He is often depicted as the central lawman in the shootout, but Virgil was Tombstone City marshal and a deputy U.S. marshal. Although Wyatt had previously served in Wichita, Kansas, and Dodge City as a lawman, Virgil had three years of Civil War service, and had previously worked in law enforcement as a sheriff, constable, and marshal. Virgil made the decision to enforce a city ordinance prohibiting carrying weapons in town and to disarm the Cowboys. While Wyatt had acted as city marshal the week prior when Virgil was out of town, Wyatt was on that day only a temporary assistant marshal to his brother.

Before the Gunfight at the O.K. Corral, Virgil and Wyatt had been in only one shootout each, and Morgan had never been in any gun battles. Billy Claiborne had been in one gunfight prior to the shootout and was the only member of the Cowboy faction that had prior gunfighting experience (not counting the Skeleton Canyon massacre, in which the McLaurys and Clantons took part). Doc Holliday, despite his reputation, had not taken part in any gunfights, although he was involved in several drunken brawls involving both guns and knives. Both Tom and Ike had spent the night before the gunfight gambling, drinking heavily, and without sleep. Now they were both outdoors, wounded from having been pistol-whipped by the Earps earlier that morning, and at least Ike was still drunk.

Virgil initially avoided a confrontation with Frank McLaury and Billy Clanton, who had arrived in town early that afternoon and had not yet deposited their weapons at a hotel or stable after their arrival, as required by ordinance#9. Virgil had been offered armed assistance from the town Vigilance committee and the town militia, but he declined the help. Around 1:00 p.m., a miner named Ruben F. Coleman told Virgil that the Cowboys had left the Dunbar and Dexter Stable for the O.K. Corral and were still armed, and Virgil decided he had to disarm them.

Virgil testified after the shootout that he thought he saw Ike Clanton, Billy Clanton, Frank McLaury, and Tom McLaury buying cartridges at Spangenberg's gun shop beforehand. He went by the Wells Fargo office around the corner on Allen Street and picked up a 10- or 12-gauge short, double-barreled shotgun. It was an unusually cold and windy day in Tombstone, and Virgil was wearing a long overcoat. To avoid alarming Tombstone's public, Virgil hid the shotgun under his overcoat when he returned to Hafford's Saloon.

Virgil, his brothers Wyatt and Morgan, and Doc Holliday confronted the Cowboys in a narrow lot on Fremont Street. Virgil was not expecting a fight. He later testified that when he saw the Cowboys, he immediately commanded them to "Throw up your hands, I want your guns!" But shooting broke out almost immediately. Witnesses were conflicted about who fired first. During the gunfight, Billy Clanton and both McLaury brothers were killed. Virgil was shot through the calf (he thought by Billy Clanton). Three days after the O.K. Corral gunfight, the city council suspended Virgil as city marshal pending outcome of the preliminary hearing. Virgil was eventually exonerated of wrongdoing, but his reputation suffered thereafter.

== Assassination attempt ==
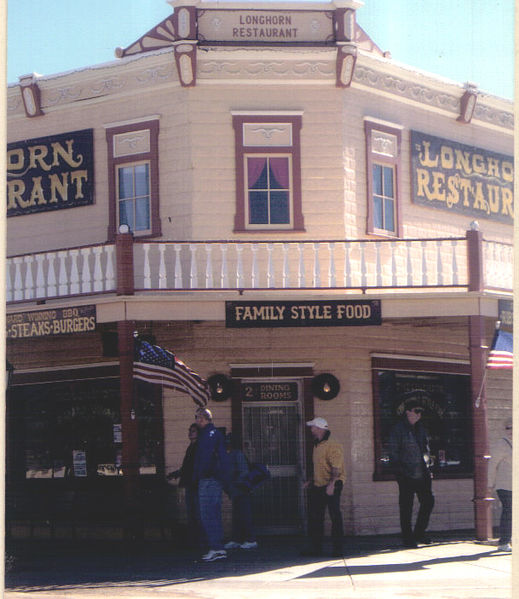
The Longhorn Restaurant is located where the Huachuca Water Company and the Meyers Brothers clothing store stood. The original building burned in 1942. Virgil Earp was shot from the second floor.

After the Gunfight at the O.K. Corral the Earps relocated their families to the Cosmopolitan Hotel for mutual support and protection. At about 11:30 pm on December 28, 1881, Virgil was ambushed as he walked from the Oriental Saloon to his room. The Sacramento Daily Record-Union reported that "he was fired upon with double-barreled shotguns, loaded with buckshot, by three men concealed in an unfinished building diagonally across on Allen street."

Virgil was hit in the back and left arm by three loads of buckshot from about 60 feet (18 m). The Crystal Palace Saloon and the Eagle Brewery beyond Virgil were struck by nineteen buckshot; three passed through the window and one about a foot over the heads of some men standing by a faro-table. George Parsons wrote that he heard "four shots in quick succession." Critically wounded, Virgil staggered into the hotel.

Earp's upper arm was longitudinally fractured, and Dr. George E. Goodfellow removed 4 inches (100 mm) of shattered humerus bone and his elbow, leaving his arm permanently crippled. Virgil told his wife Allie, "Never mind, I've got one arm left to hug you with." Virgil was also shot through the back above the hip, and Goodfellow removed twenty buckshot that penetrated his body and lodged near the hip bone above the groin. The Los Angeles Daily Herald reported that the "cow-boys are bent on vengeance for the slaughter of their companeros a few weeks ago." "The doctor says there are four chances in five that he will die."

George W. Parsons, who had been treated by Goodfellow for an injury he received, was staying in Goodfellow's office while he recuperated. He kept a journal, in which he recorded:

Longitudinal fracture, so [Virgil's] elbow joint had to be taken out today and we've got that and some of the shattered bone in room. Patient doing well. It is surmised that Ike Clanton, Curly Bill [Brocius] and [Will] McLaury did the shooting. Bad state of affairs here. Something will have to be done.

=== Others threatened ===
Wyatt, assuming that Virgil was dying, telegraphed U.S. Marshal Crawley Dake asking him to name him as Virgil's replacement as deputy U.S. marshal:

Tombstone, Arizona Territory, December 29, 1882 Virgil Earp was shot by concealed assassins last night. His wounds are fatal. Telegraph me appointment with power to appoint deputies. Local authorities are doing nothing. The lives of other citizens are threatened. Wyatt Earp

Commenting on the telegram received by Dake, the Weekly Arizona Miner wrote about the repeated threats received by the Earps and others.

For some time, the Earps, Doc Holliday, Tom Fitch and others who upheld and defended the Earps in their late trial have received, almost daily, anonymous letters, warning them to leave town or suffer death, supposed to have been written by friends of the Clanton and McLowry boys, three of whom the Earps and Holliday killed and little attention was paid to them as they were believed to be idle boasts but the shooting of Virgil Earp last night shows that the men were in earnest. The Los Angeles Herald reported on December 30 that "the "local authorities are doing nothing to capture the assassins so far as is known ... Judge Spicer, Marshal Williams, Wyatt Earp, Rickabaugh and other are in momentary danger of assassination."

=== Suspects ===
The suspected shooters were later identified as Phin Clanton, Ike Clanton, Johnny Barnes, Johnny Ringo, Hank Swilling and Pete Spence. On Tuesday, January 31, 1881, Ike and Phin were brought before Judge William H. Stilwell on suspicion of shooting Virgil. The district attorney asked that bail be set at $5,000, but the judge released both men on $1,500 bond, indicating he thought the prosecution's case was weak.

Although a hat that Wyatt later claimed belonged to Ike Clanton was found near the shooting, the evidence was circumstantial. Sherman McMaster provided the most convincing evidence. He testified that he saw Ike later that night in nearby Charleston. He said he asked Clanton "about the shooting, at which Clanton replied that he 'would have to go back and do the job over.'" On February 2, Clanton's attorney brought in seven witnesses who provided an alibi for Clanton. They all testified that Clanton had been in Charleston at the time of Virgil's shooting. Spicer was compelled to release Clanton.

=== Morgan Earp murdered ===
After his shooting, Virgil spent the next three months getting back on his feet, when on Saturday, March 18, 1882, Virgil's younger brother Morgan Earp was killed in another ambush.

On Monday, March 20, Virgil and Allie were escorted by Wyatt and deputies Warren Earp, Doc Holliday, Sherman McMaster, and "Turkey Creek" Jack Johnson to Contention, where they drove two wagons to the Arizona and New Mexico Railroad terminal 25 miles (40 km) away in Benson. Wyatt and his deputies had initially planned to travel only as far as Benson. Wyatt reported later that he received word in Contention that Ike Clanton, Frank Stilwell, Hank Swilling, and another cowboy were watching the passenger trains in Tucson with the aim to kill Virgil. Wyatt and the rest of the posse remained with Virgil and Allie through to Tucson.

The men were well armed with pistols, rifles and shotguns. McMaster wore two cartridge belts. Allie wore Virgil's pistol belt during the journey so it would be handy. Virgil told the San Francisco Examiner two months later that upon getting off the train in Tucson, "Almost the first men we met on the platform there were Stilwell and his friends, armed to the teeth." "They fell back into the crowd as soon as they saw I had an escort, and the boys took me to the hotel to supper." Guarded by his brothers and the deputies, Virgil and Allie had dinner at Porter's Hotel in Tucson. Virgil was so weak he had to be carried up the steps of the train. Once they were safely seated, the rest of the guards kept watch for the Cowboys. Virgil and Allie along with James accompanied Morgan's body to the Earp family home in Colton, California.

As Virgil's train was pulling out of Tucson on its way to California, gunfire was heard. Witnesses gave contradictory accounts about the number of men seen near the tracks and numbers of shots fired. Some said the Earps were armed after leaving Porter's Hotel and others said they were not. Witnesses saw men running with weapons but could not identify anyone in the dark. Wyatt said later that he and his deputies spotted Frank Stilwell and another man he believed to be Ike Clanton armed with shotguns lying on a flatcar.

When Wyatt and his men approached, the two men ran. Stilwell may have stumbled or been wounded, allowing Wyatt to reach him. Wyatt later said he shot Stilwell as Stilwell attempted to push the barrel of Earp's shotgun away. Wyatt, quoted in the Denver Republican, said "I ran straight for Stilwell. It was he who killed my brother. What a coward he was! He couldn't shoot when I came near him. He stood there helpless and trembling for his life. As I rushed upon him he put out his hands and clutched at my shotgun. I let go both barrels, and he tumbled down dead and mangled at my feet."

He said Stilwell cried "Morg!" before he was killed. Stilwell's body, riddled with buckshot from two shotgun rounds, one in his leg and the second in his chest with powder burns, and four other bullet wounds, was found the next morning near the tracks. Ike Clanton got away. When the Tucson sheriff learned who was responsible for Stilwell's death, he issued warrants for the lawmen's arrest.

Clanton gave an interview afterward to the newspapers in which he claimed that he and Stilwell had been in Tucson to respond to federal charges about interfering with a U.S. mail carrier, stemming from his alleged involvement in robbing the Sandy Bob line of the Bisbee stage on September 8, 1881. Clanton said that they had heard that the Earps were coming via the train and they had plans to kill Stilwell. According to Clanton, Stilwell disappeared from the hotel before he was found several blocks away, shot dead by the tracks.

== Later life and death ==
After Virgil was ambushed and maimed in Tombstone, he and Allie moved to his parents' home in Colton, California, to recover from his wounds, which took almost two years. He sought treatment for his wounds in San Francisco and was interviewed on the Southern Pacific train by a reporter whose story was printed in the San Francisco Examiner on May 27, 1882. The reporter described Virgil's appearance:

His face, voice and manner were prepossessing. He is close to six feet in height, of medium build, chestnut hair, sandy mustache, light eyebrows, quiet, blue eyes and frank expression. He wore a wide-brimmed, slate-colored slouch hat, pants of a brown and white stripe, and a blue diagonal coat and vest, both the latter with bullet holes in them, bearing testimony of a recent fight when he was shot in the back, the bullet coming out of the front of his vest. His left arm was carried in a sling, also a memento of his last fight, when he received a bullet in his arm, since causing the loss of about six inches of bone which crippled him for life. The wounded arm is the cause of his visit to this city, where he seeks surgical aid in hope of so far recovering its use that he may be able to dress himself unaided.

Despite the use of only one arm, Virgil was hired by the Southern Pacific Railroad to guard its tracks in Colton's famous "battle of the crossing". Virgil carried a top break revolver that could be reloaded with one hand. Southern Pacific was attempting to stop the California Southern Railroad, a subsidiary of the Atchison, Topeka and Santa Fe Railway, from installing a crossing over the Southern Pacific tracks in Colton to gain access to California, which resulted in the frog war. Governor Waterman deputized a posse from San Bernardino, California and came down in person to enforce construction of the crossing, ending the Southern Pacific's railroad monopoly in Southern California.

In 1884 Earp's father, Nicholas Porter Earp was elected justice of the peace in Colton. Two years later, Virgil Earp opened a private detective agency, which by all accounts he had quit by 1886, when he was elected village constable in July.

When Colton was incorporated as a city, Earp was elected as Colton's first City Marshal on July 11, 1887. He was paid $75 a month and was re-elected to another term in 1888. Among other duties, he was reported to have cleared blocked sewers and kept track of the electric light bulbs. Virgil and Allie Earp's Colton home still stands at 528 West "H" Street.

In 1888 Earp resigned as city marshal and he and Allie left Colton for San Bernardino. Five years later, in 1893, he and his wife moved to the short-lived mining town Vanderbilt, California. He owned and operated the only two-story building in town, Earp's Hall, a saloon and meeting hall used for public gatherings and even the town's church services. His business success in Vanderbilt did not match his success in politics, and he lost the election for town constable in 1894.

In 1895, Virgil and Allie traveled to Cripple Creek, Colorado, where they met Virgil's brother Wyatt. They stayed briefly and soon moved back to Prescott in Yavapai County, Arizona, where Virgil became involved in mining. Virgil started mining in the Hassayampa district in partnership with W.H. Harlon. They leased the Grizzly mine owned by W.C. Hanson. The Prescott Weekly Journal-Miner reported on November 8, 1896, that the day before "a serious accident had occurred at this mine. Virgil Earp and W. H. Harlon were working in a tunnel. The ground caved catching Mr. Earp and pinning him to the ground. He was unconscious for several hours and Dr. Abbott, was called to dress his wounds." The doctor told Earp he had dislocated his right hip. Both his feet and ankles were badly crushed, he had a serious cut on his head and bruises all over his body. The doctor said it would be several weeks before Virgil would be able to move around again, but it took him much longer to recover. They moved south after that and began ranching in the Kirkland Valley. Virgil was nominated as the Republican candidate for Yavapai county sheriff in 1900 but declined the nomination, possibly for health reasons.

=== Reunites with first wife ===
In 1898 Earp received a startling letter from a Mrs. Levi Law. At the end of the Civil War, his wife Ellen was told by her family that Virgil had been killed. Her family had been against their marriage. They took her and the baby daughter Nellie to Walla Walla, Washington, where she later married Thomas Eaton. She had four more children. Mrs. Levi Law was Virgil's daughter, Nellie. The next year, encouraged by his wife, Virgil traveled to Portland, Oregon, where he was reunited with Ellen and Nellie Jane Law. On April 22, 1898, The Oregonian reported that Earp "... is now enjoying a very pleasant visit with her and his two grandchildren at her home, which is near that of Mrs. Eaton, in North Portland." He also met three grandchildren he never knew existed. Later that year, according to her letter to The Oregonian, Nellie Jane visited Virgil and Allie Earp at their home in Arizona.

=== Death in Nevada ===
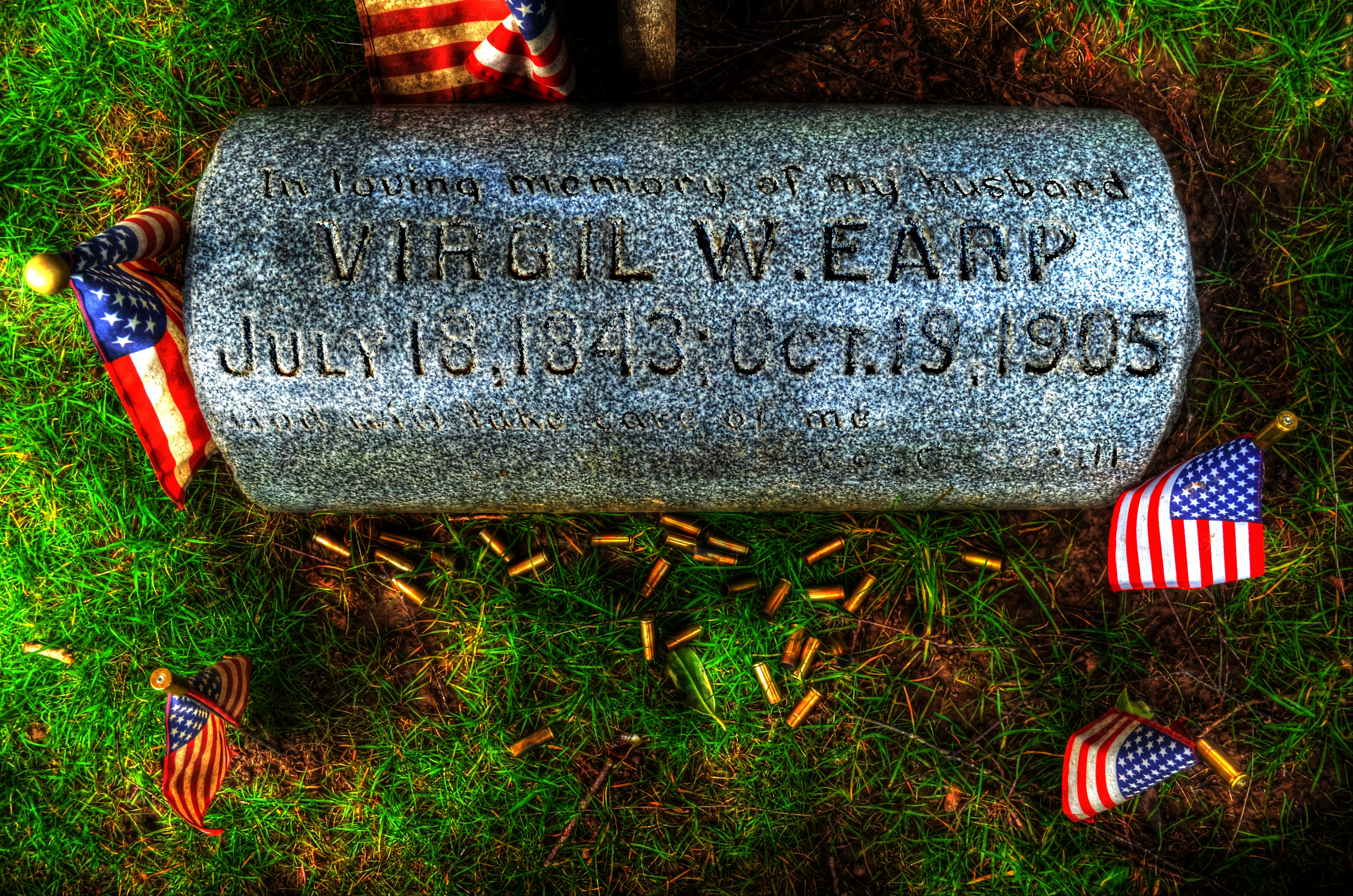
Virgil Earp Headstone located in River View Cemetery, Portland, Oregon

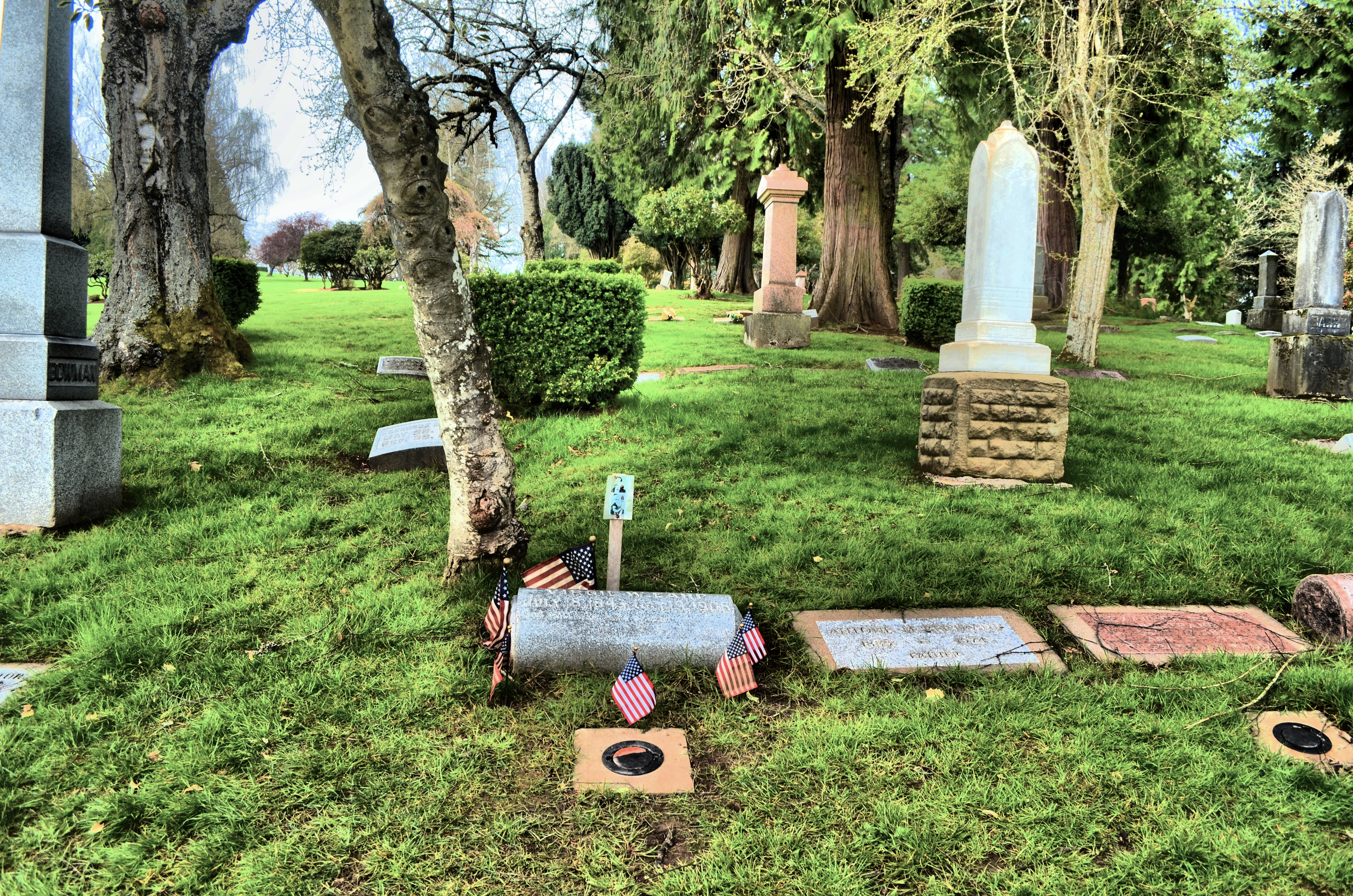
Virgil Earp grave site in River View Cemetery, Portland, Oregon

Before 1904, Virgil and Allie returned to Colton, where city records show that he along with three others unsuccessfully petitioned the city leaders to repeal a temperance law that allowed only one saloon in town. In 1904, they left California for the last time and moved to the boom town of Goldfield in Esmeralda County, Nevada, where Virgil planned to open a saloon. He quickly discovered there was plenty of competition and realized he didn't have the capital required. Virgil and Allie were down to their last dollar so he took up gambling, at which he had been good.

In January 1905 he was hired as a deputy sheriff for Esmeralda County, where he was essentially a county paid security guard at the National Club. Virgil caught pneumonia in February 1905. His brother Wyatt was also living in Goldfield and visited with him. Earp slowly got better and attended an Order of Eagles meeting in May.

The serious injuries he had sustained during the mine cave-in several years earlier had left him debilitated and he never recovered his full health. Earp's recovery from pneumonia did not last and in early October he had a relapse. On October 19, 1905, Earp died at St. Mary's hospital in Goldfield.

In her memoirs, Allie wrote that Virgil's last words were, "Light my cigar, and stay here and hold my hand." His brother Wyatt was the last surviving participant of the Gunfight at the O.K. Corral. Virgil was also survived by his father Nicholas, brothers James and Newton, wife Allie, and daughter Nellie.

At the request of his daughter, Nellie Jane Bohn, Allie sent his body to Portland, Oregon, and he was buried in the River View Cemetery there.

== In popular culture ==
Virgil Earp has been portrayed by several actors.

- Rex Bell in the 1942 film Tombstone, the Town Too Tough to Die.
- Tim Holt in the 1946 film My Darling Clementine.
- John Hudson in the 1957 film Gunfight at the O.K. Corral
- John Anderson in five episodes (1960–1961) of the ABC western television series, The Life and Legend of Wyatt Earp.
- Ross Elliott in The Life and Legend of Wyatt Earp during 1958 and 1959.
- Victor Carin in the 1966 Doctor Who serial "The Gunfighters".
- Frank Converse in the 1967 film Hour of the Gun
- Charles Maxwell in the 1968 Star Trek episode "Spectre of the Gun".
- Sam Elliott in the 1993 film Tombstone.
- Michael Madsen in the 1994 film Wyatt Earp.

Police appointments
Preceded by New position	Deputy U.S. Marshal of Tombstone District of Pima County, Arizona; November 27, 1879–December 29, 1881	Succeeded by Wyatt Earp
Preceded by Fred White	City Marshal of Tombstone, Arizona (acting); October 30, 1880–November 12, 1880	Succeeded by Ben Sippy
Preceded by Ben Sippy	City Marshal of Tombstone, Arizona; June 18, 1881–October 29, 1881	Succeeded by James Flynn
