= List of historic properties in Superior, Arizona =

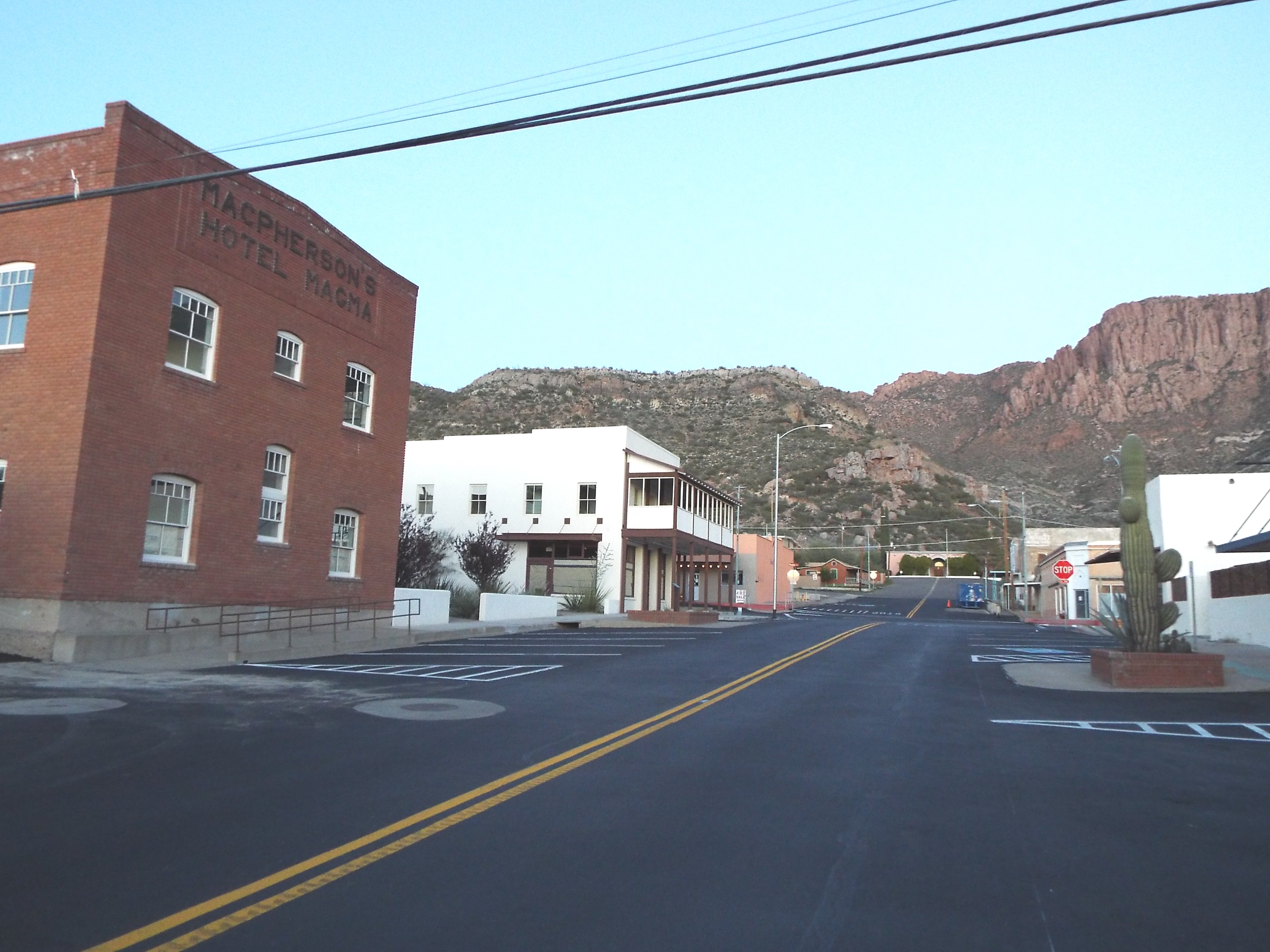
- Historic Main Street

This is a list which includes a photographic gallery, of some of the structures of historic significance in Superior, a mining town in Arizona. The establishment of the Silver Queen and the later Magma mines was the main factor of the founding if the town. Superior is located approximately 70 miles (110 km) east of Phoenix and the same distance north of Tucson. Within the boundaries of Superior are what remains of Pinal City a former mining town.

== Brief history ==
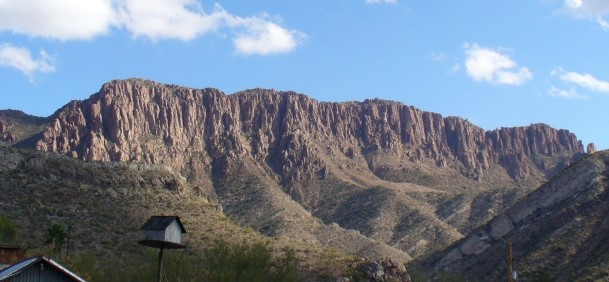
Apache Leap Mountain

Among the earliest inhabitants of the area in which Superior is located were the Native Americans of the Apache Tribe, Pascua Yaqui Tribe and the Tohono O'odham Nation. During the 1870s, at the height of the American Indian Wars, a company of Apache horsemen were ambushed by the US cavalry. After losing 50 men; the Apache retreated up a mountain located within the boundaries of what in the future would become Superior. Accepting defeat; the remaining 75 Apache Warriors leaped to their death rather than being captured by the US Army and therefore the mountain became known as the Apache Leap Mountain.

It wasn't long before the first prospectors in search of gold arrived. Prospector Charles Mason staked the first claims in 1875. In 1880, the Silver Queen Mining Company was organized and in 1882 the town of Hastings was founded and platted in 1900. Owners of a successful silver mine named their mine "Lake Superior". These stockholders were originally from Michigan. The "Lake Superior Mine" was the main contributor to the area's economy and therefore in 1902, the community changed the name of Hastings to Superior after the mine.

William Boyce Thompson bought the old Silver Queen Mine in 1910, and by 1912, the new Magma Copper Company was in production running the operations of the Silver Queen Mine. The Magma Copper Company became one Arizona's greatest copper producer after the silver vein of the Queen Silver Mine dried and ran out.

One of the outcomes World War I and World War II was the increased demand of copper and as such the town flourished. However, by the 1980s the main mining operations were moved to the nearby town of Miami. The Magma Copper Company's smelter, with the exception of the historic smelter stack, was demolished.

In December 2017, the Resolution Copper Project began to mine in the land where the old Magma Copper Company was once located. The Resolution Copper Project is a joint venture between Rio Tinto of London and BHP-Billiton of Australia.

== Superior Historical Society ==
According to the Superior Historical Society, its mission is "to preserve the rich history of this beautiful area, to remember those that came before us, who forged on through adversity and, many times, hostile conditions to create this place known as Home".

== Historic buildings ==
William Boyce Thompson

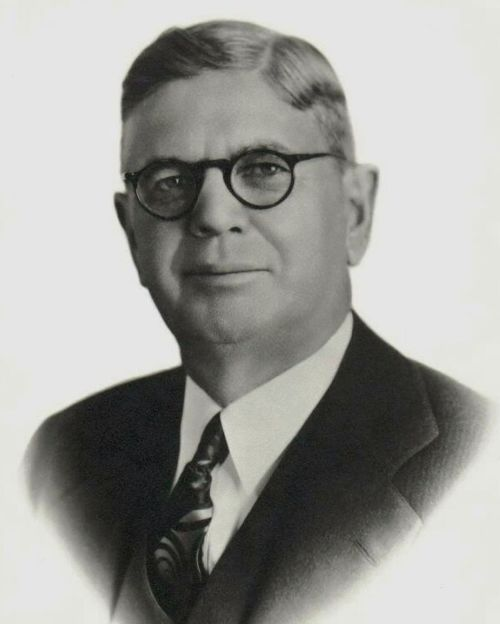
Robert Taylor Jones

The following are the properties in this list:

- The Magma Hotel – The Magma Hotel complex consisted of three structures. The first structure, the original Magma Hotel, was built in 1912 and is located at 100 Main Street. In 1916, an adobe structure was added and in 1923, a two-story brick building. The brick building, which is labelled "MacPherson's Hotel Magma", is located at 130 Main Street. The adobe building, which was located between the original building and the brick addition collapsed in 2007. Both the original Magma Hotel and the MacPherson's Hotel Magma were listed in the National Register of Historic Places on August 18, 1994, ref. #94000981, under one name, that of the Magma Hotel.
- Dahling's Grocery Store – Dahling's was owned by Thomas and Pauline Dowling. The grocery store building is located at 71 Main Street and was built in 1912. Later the building was occupied by "La Mina Bar".
- Griffee's Market – The structure was built in 1912 and located at 75-79 Main Street. The owner Gordan C. Griffee was once an employee of Dahling's Grocery Store. By 1926, the building had been divided between a bakery at No. 75 and a restaurant at No. 79. Above the first floor was the Coleman Hotel.
- Tiro Tres – was a store built in 1912 located in 73 Main Street between the Dahling's Grocery Store and Griffee's Markert.
- Superior High School – Built in 1920 and located at 98 North High School Avenue.
- The Uptown Cafe Building – The building, which is located at 149 Main Street, was built in 1920. The building now houses the Sunflower Market. The old cafe's blade sign announces the Sunflower Market.
- The Sprouse-Reitz Co. Building – Built in 1940 and located at 210 Main Street, it is one among many defunct chain of five and dime stores.
- The Knights of Columbus Building – Built in 1930 and located at 545 West Porphyry Street.
- The Robert "Bob" Taylor Jones House – Bob Jones was the sixth Governor of Arizona. His house was built in 1910 and is located at 300 Main Street. The house is now known as the Bob Jones Museum and houses the Superior Historical Society.
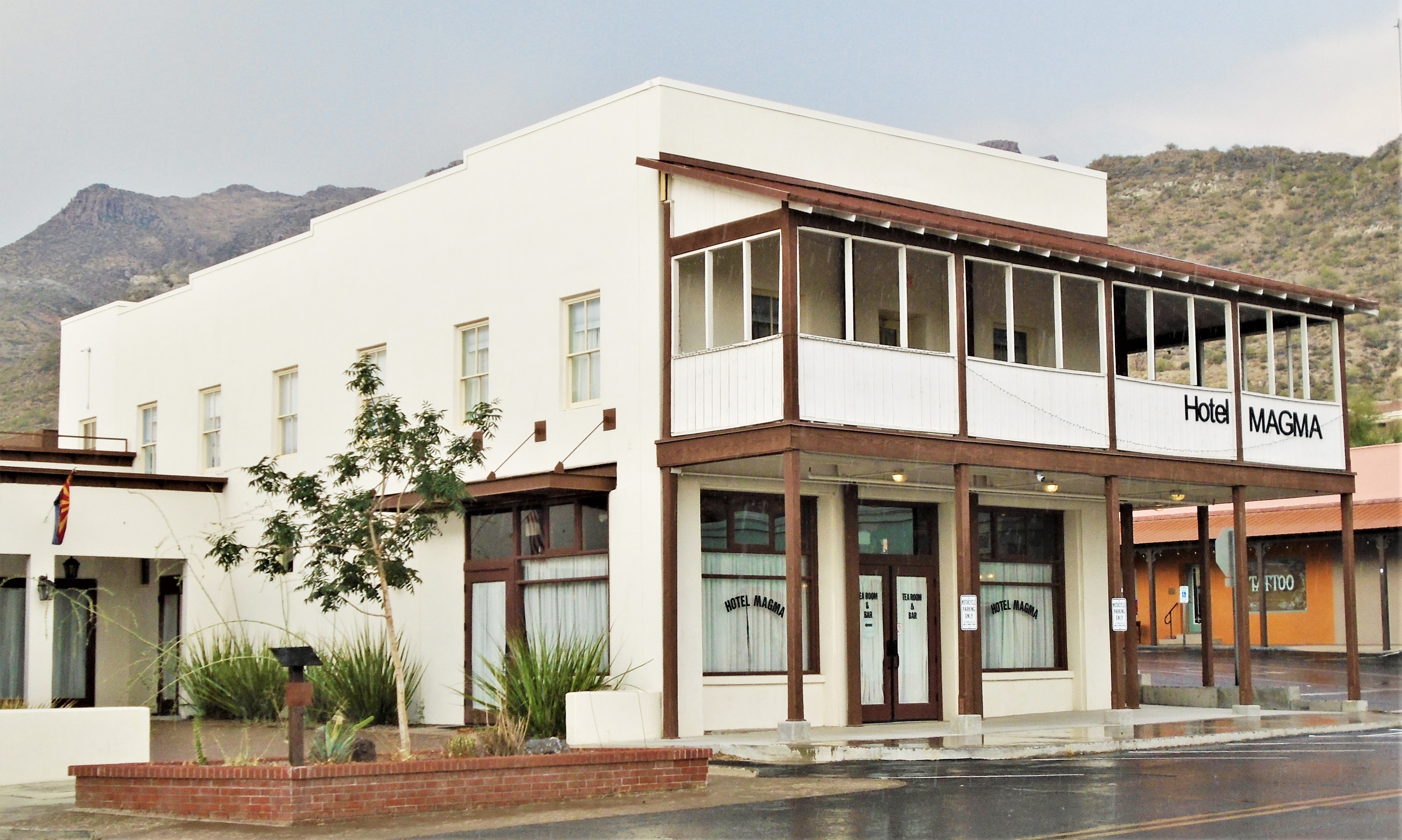
Hotel Magma original 1912 building...

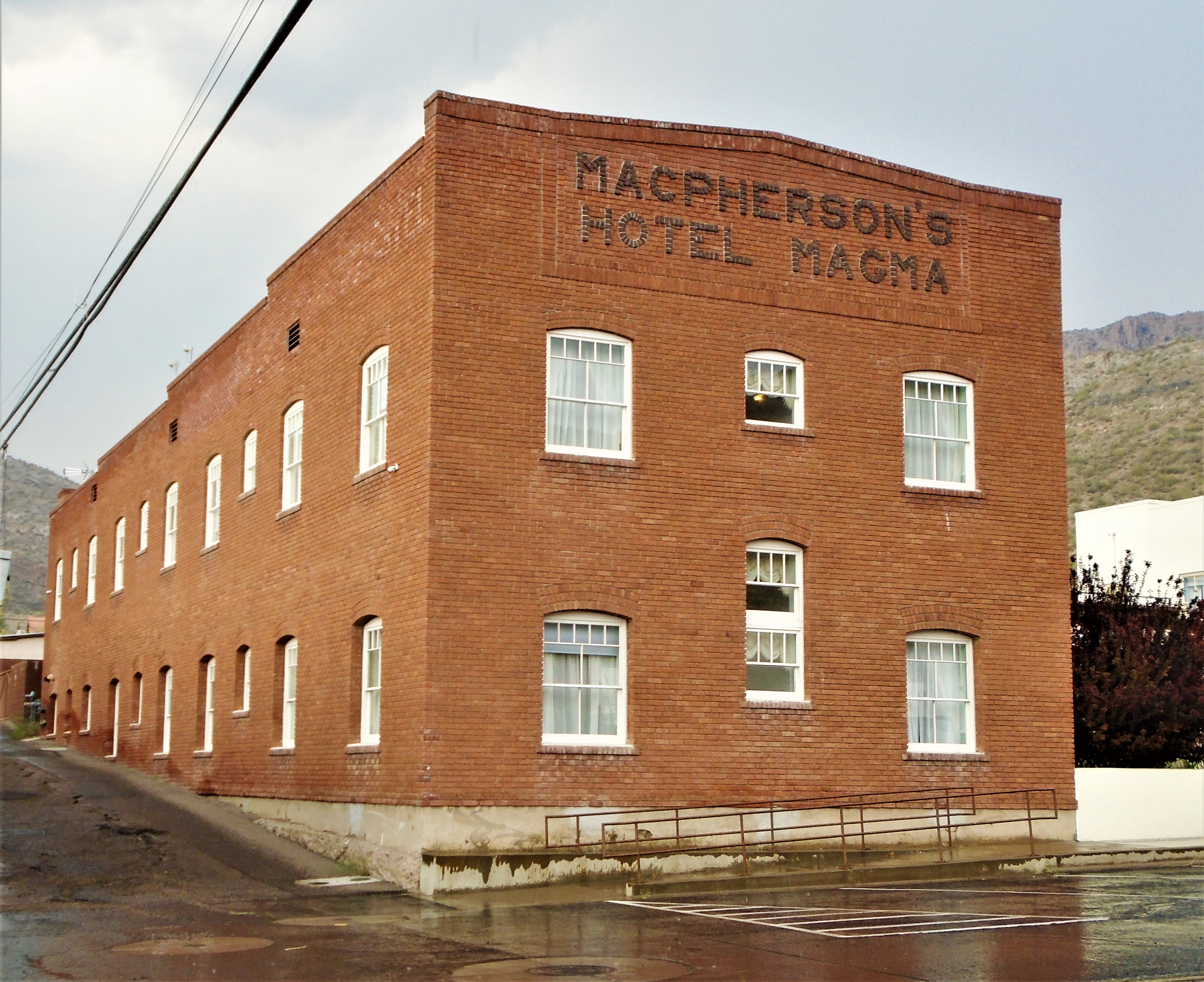
...and the 1923 addition

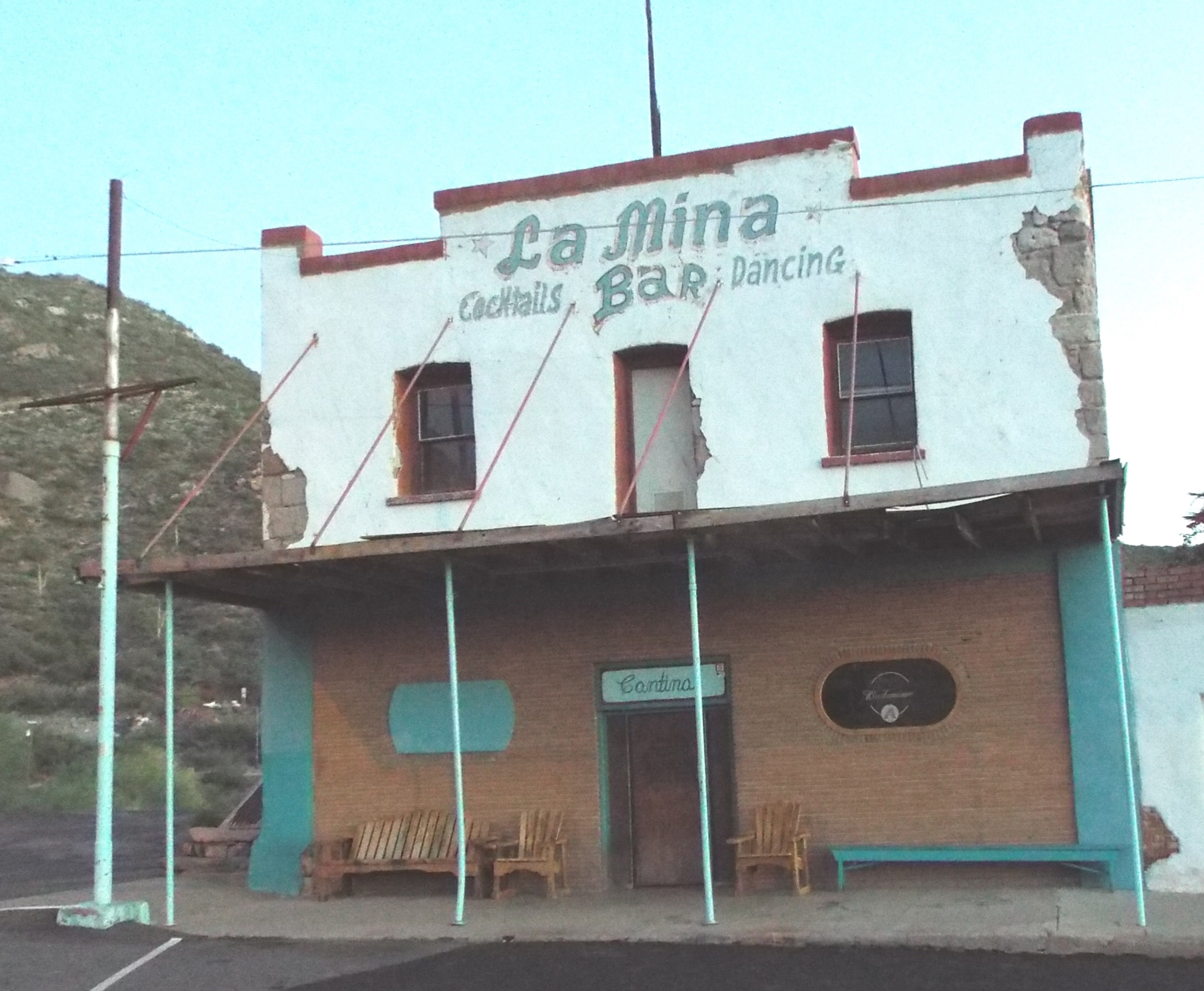
Dahling's Grocery Store

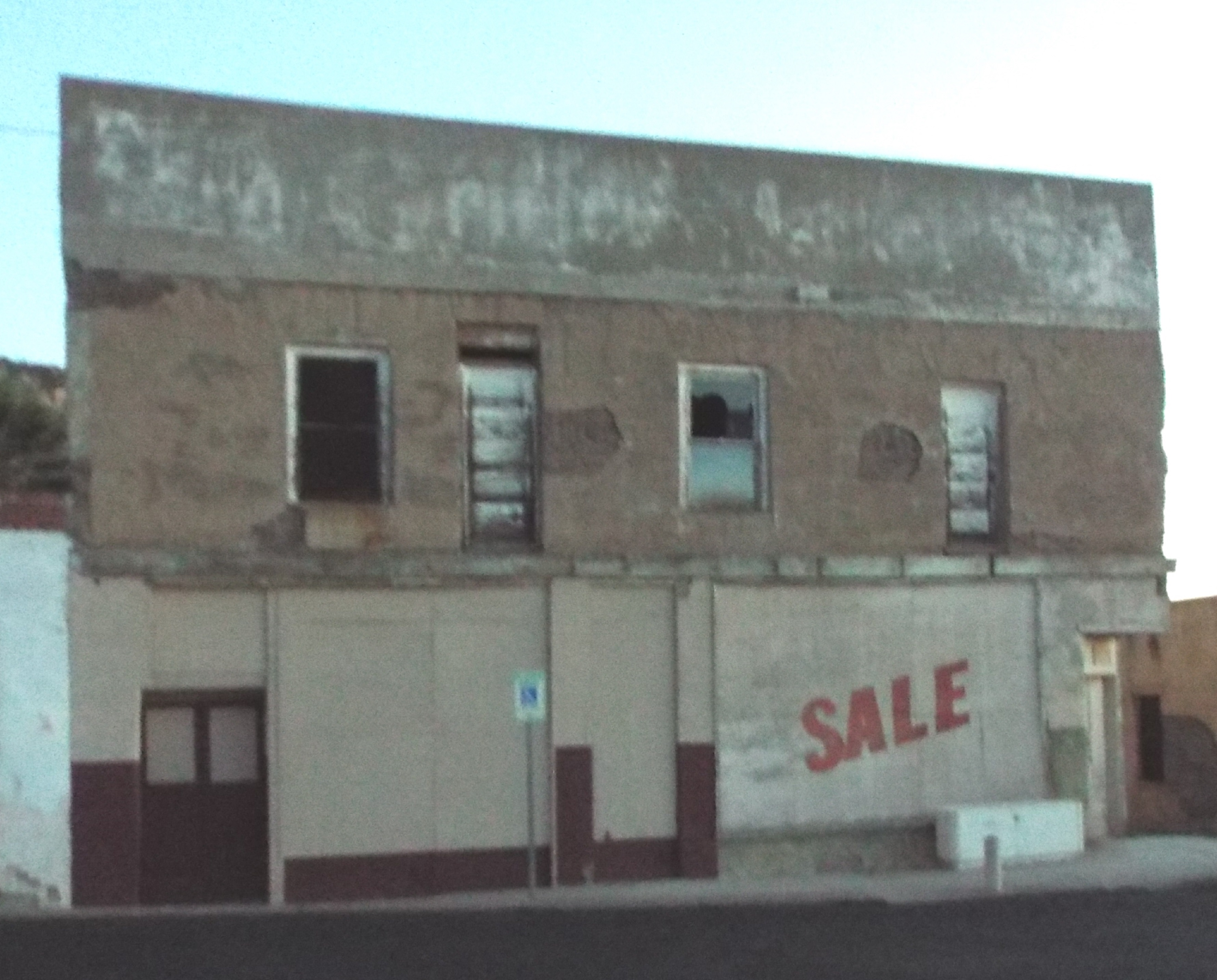
Griffee's Market

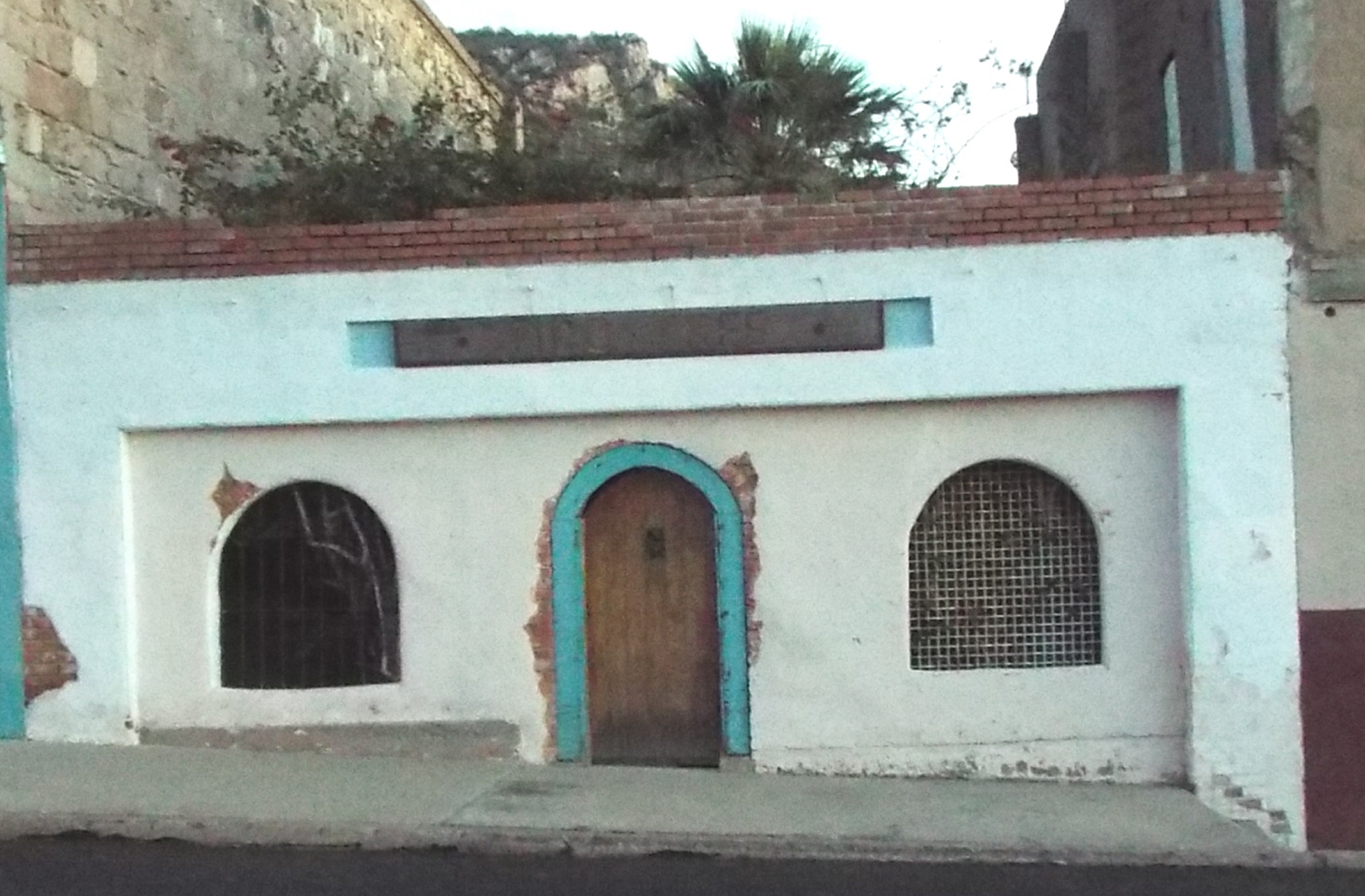
Tiro Tres Building

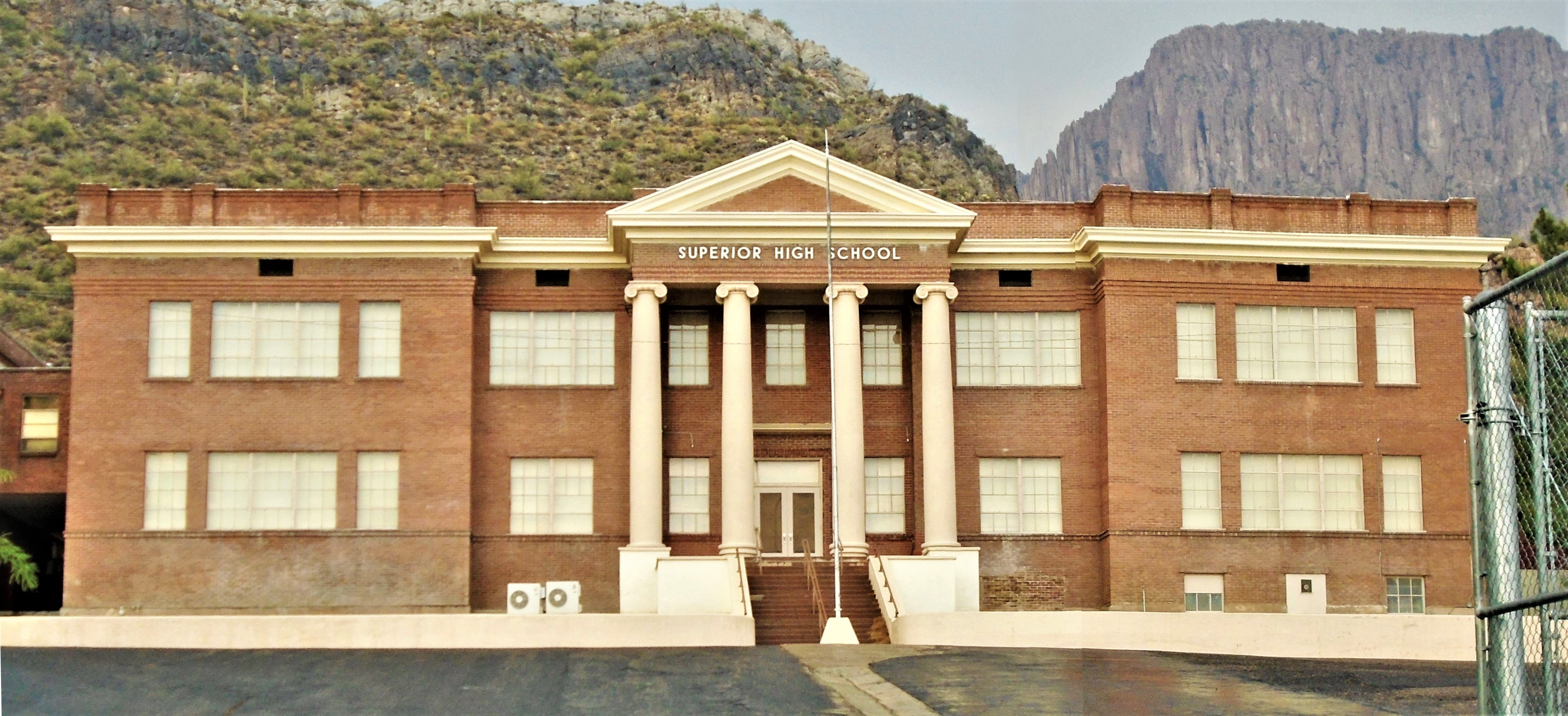
Superior High School

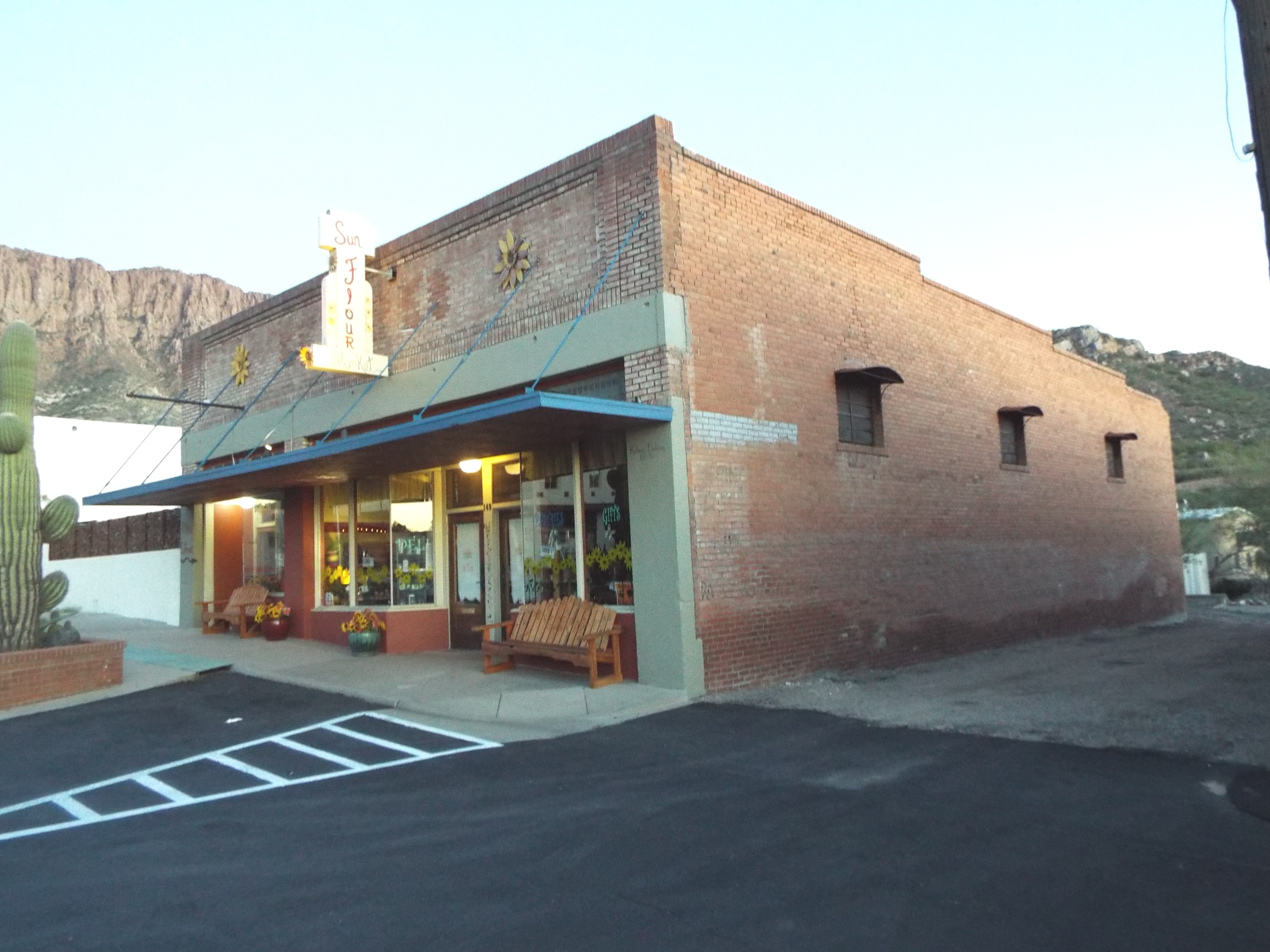
Uptown Cafe Building

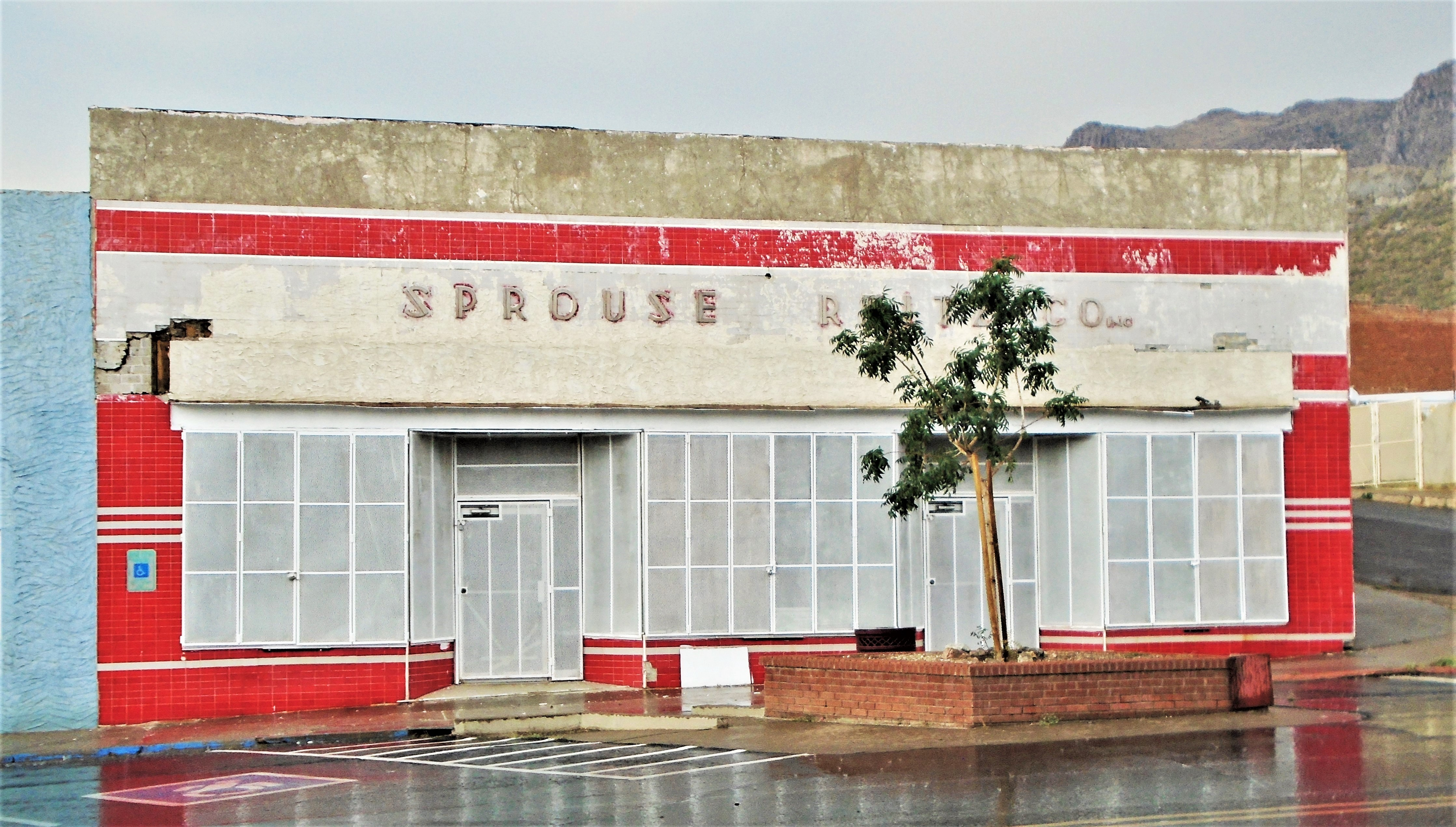
The former Sprouse-Reitz store at 210 Main Street

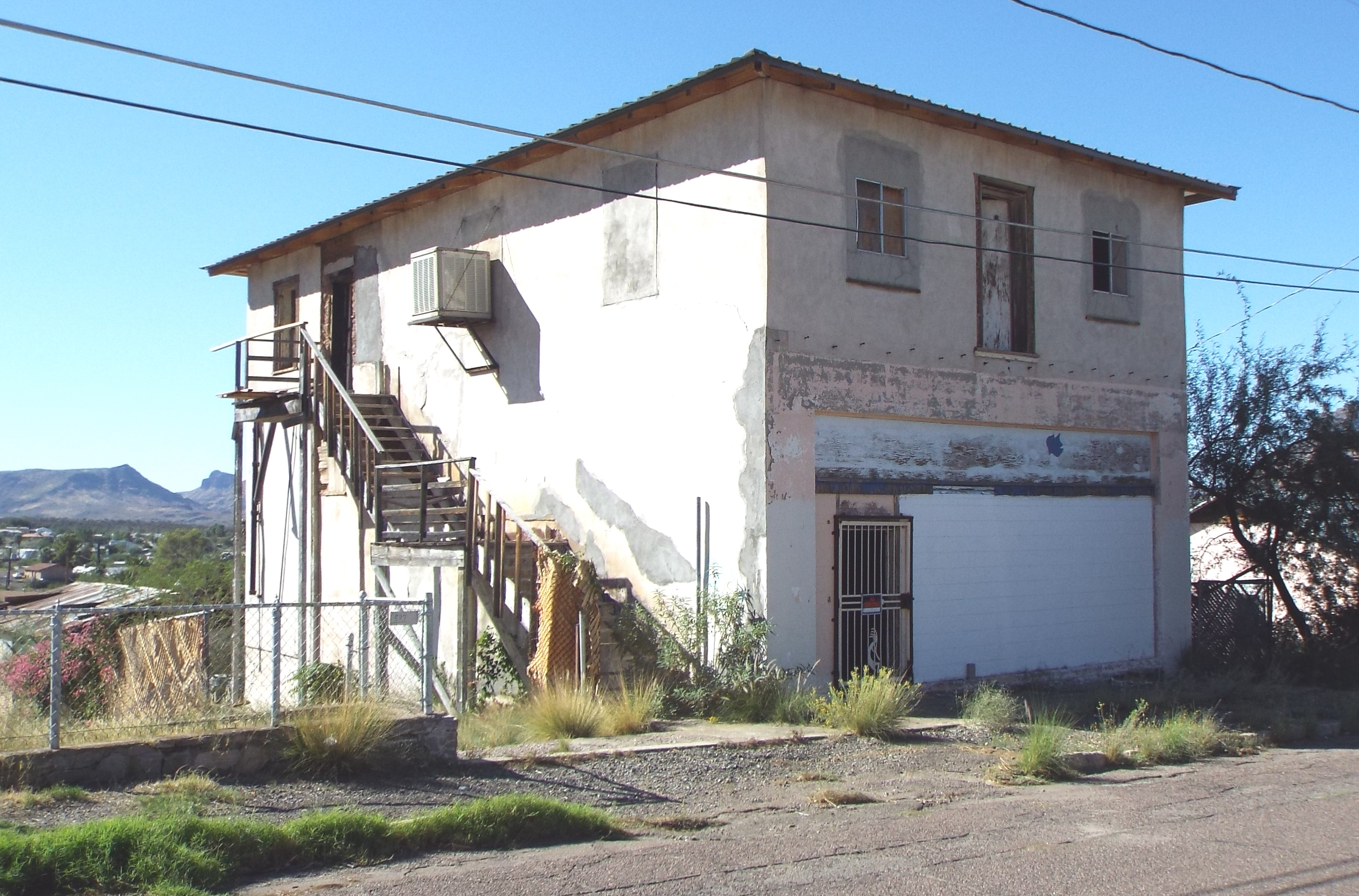
Knights of Columbus Building

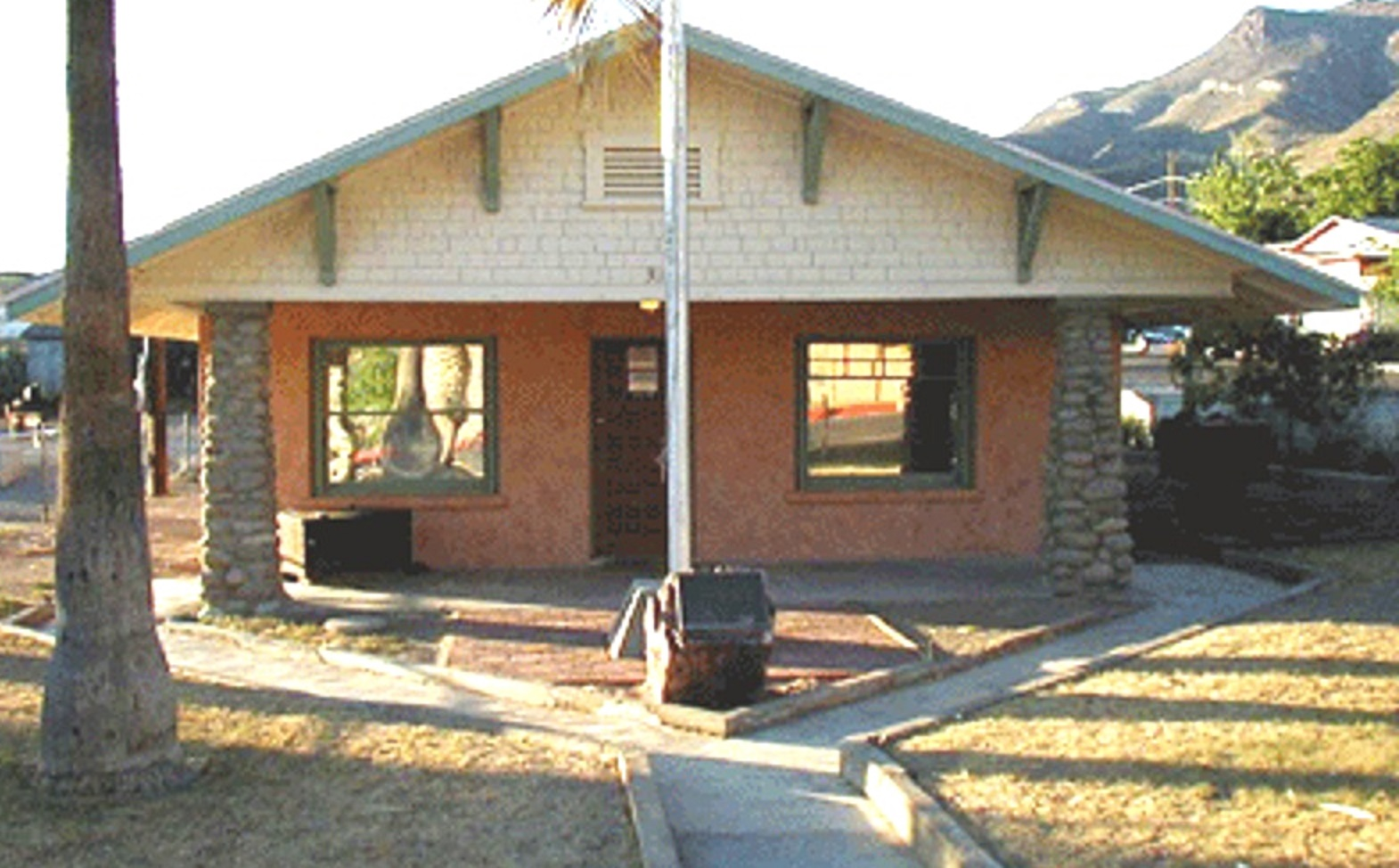
Governor Robert "Bob" Taylor Jones House

== Historic structures ==
- The Magma Avenue Bridge – Built in 1910 over the Queen Creek, served as an entrance to the town of Superior from the old Hwy. 60.
- The Old Queen Creek Bridge – Built in 1920 over Upper Queen Creek. It was listed in the National Register of Historic Places on September 30, 1988, ref. #88001679.
- The Queen Creek Viaduct – was built in 1949 to carry U.S. Route 60 over Queen Creek Canyon. It is a steel arch bridge with a total length of 576.8 ft. The bridge inventory number is AZ 406 (Arizona bridge number).
- The Smelter Stack – The 300-foot smelter stack of the Magma Smelter Complex was built in 1921. The iconic stack was demolished on November 10, 2018.
- Old Hwy 60 – As seen by the edge of Queen Creek on the opposite side of the Magma Mine.
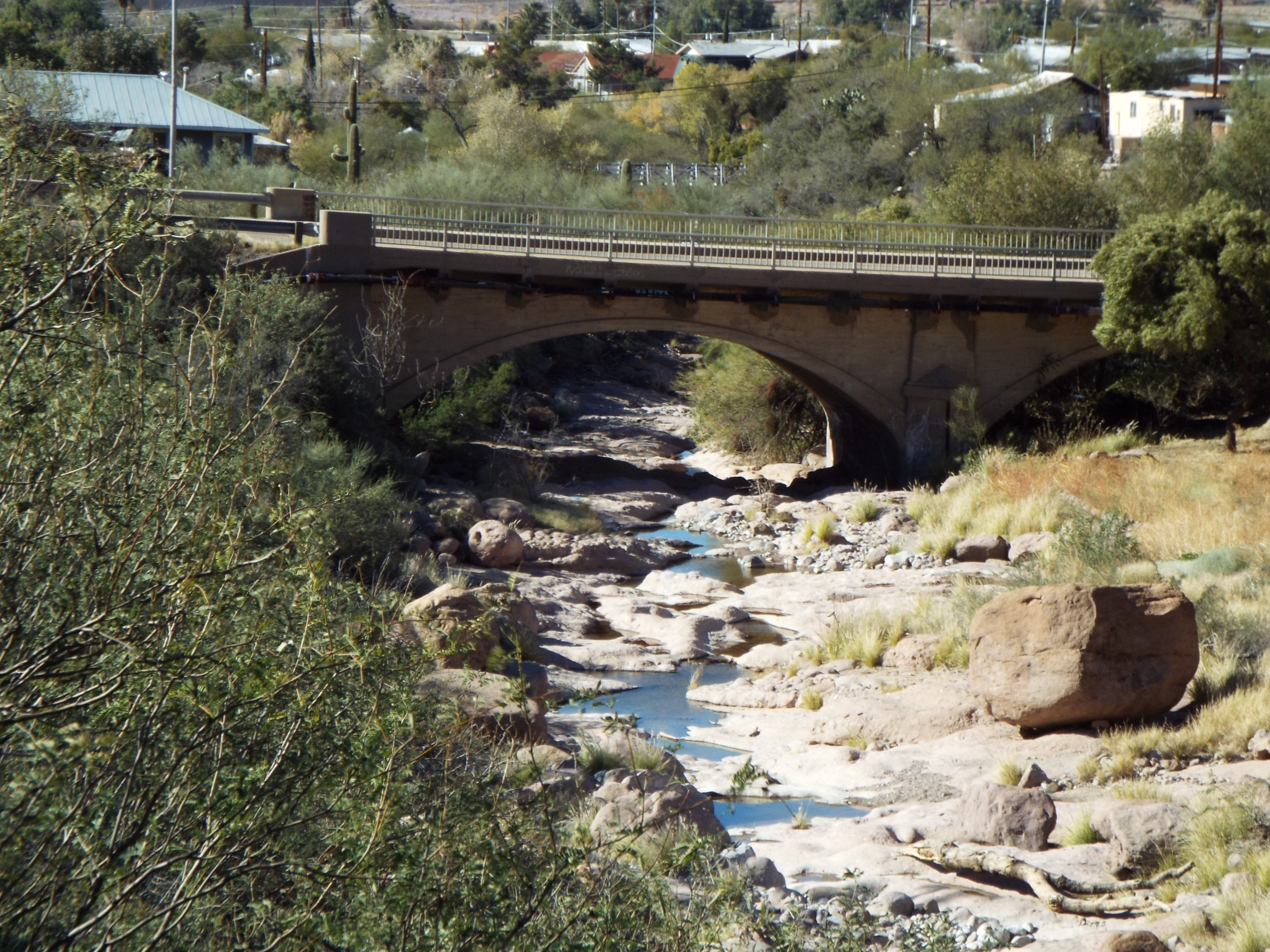
Magma Avenue Bridge

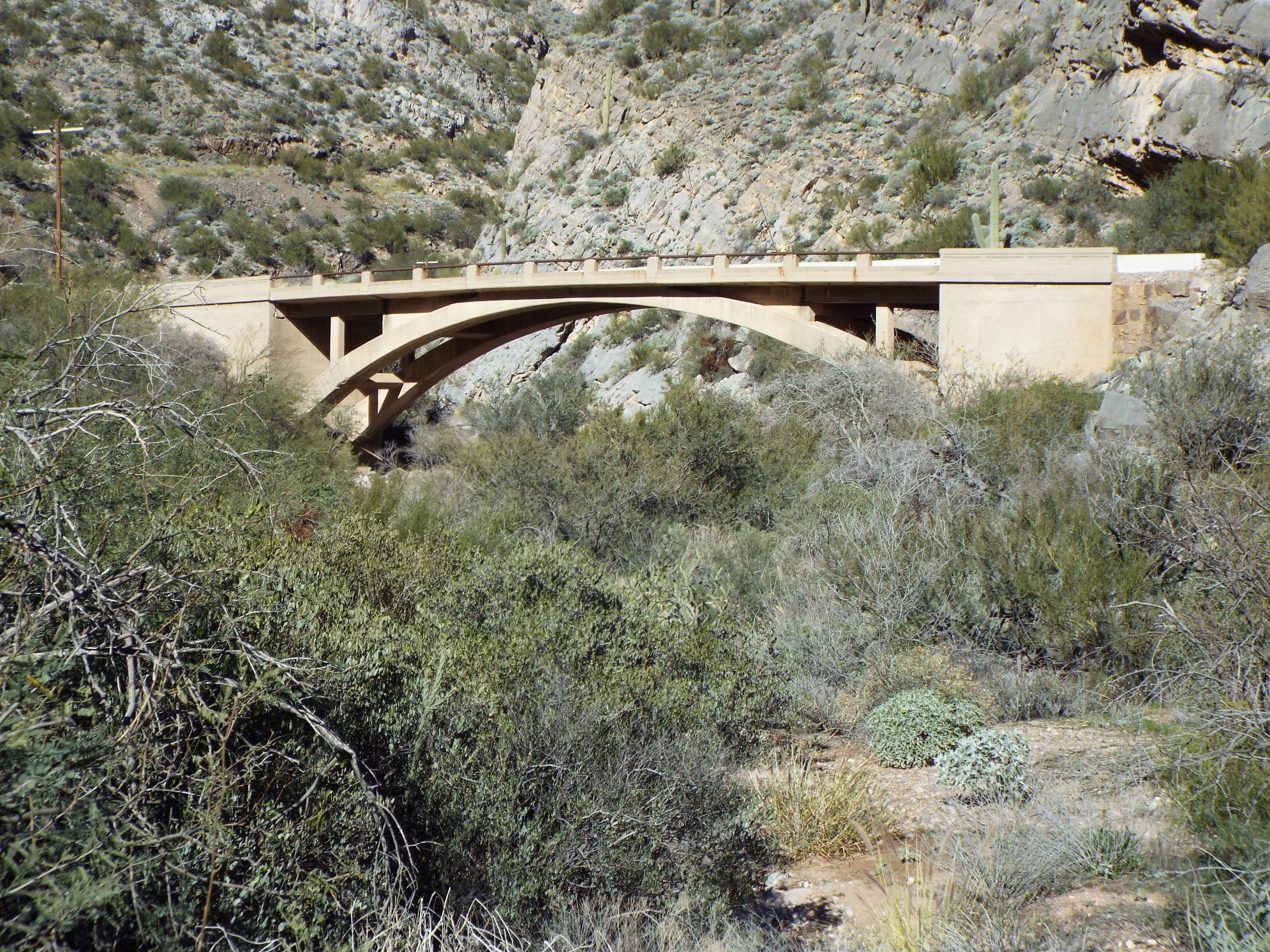
Historic Queen Creek Bridge

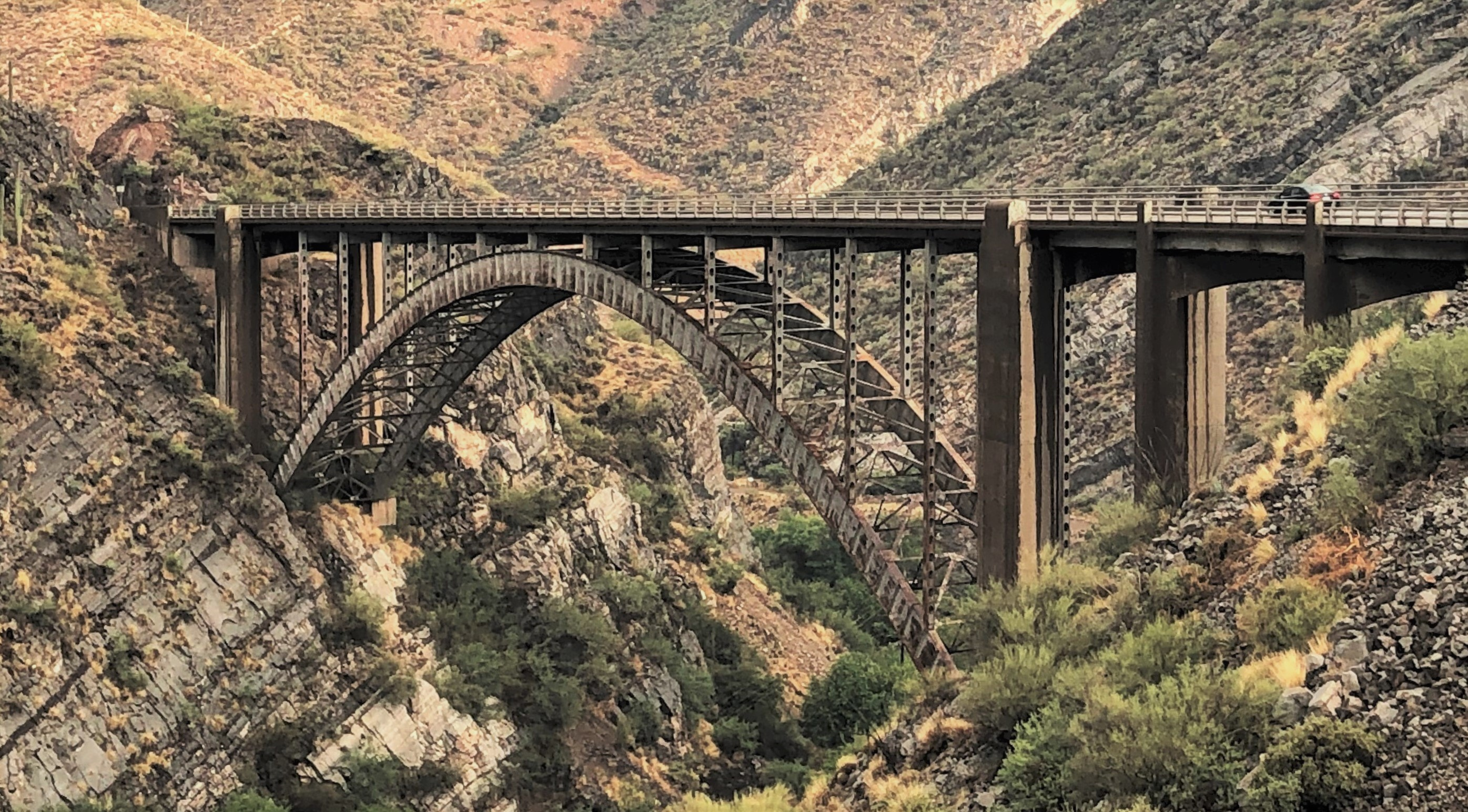
Queen Creek Viaduct

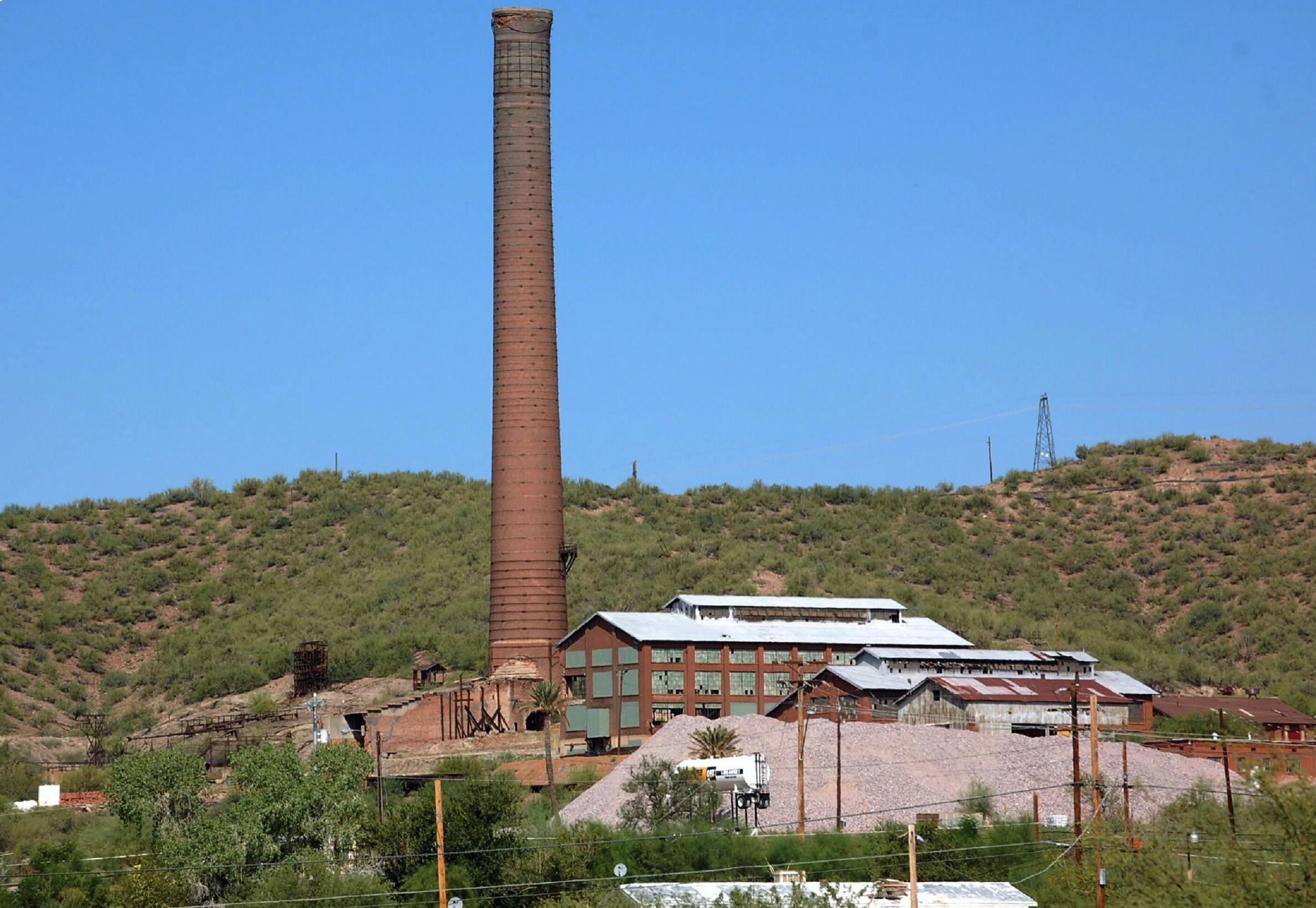
Smelter Stack of the old Magma Smelter Complex

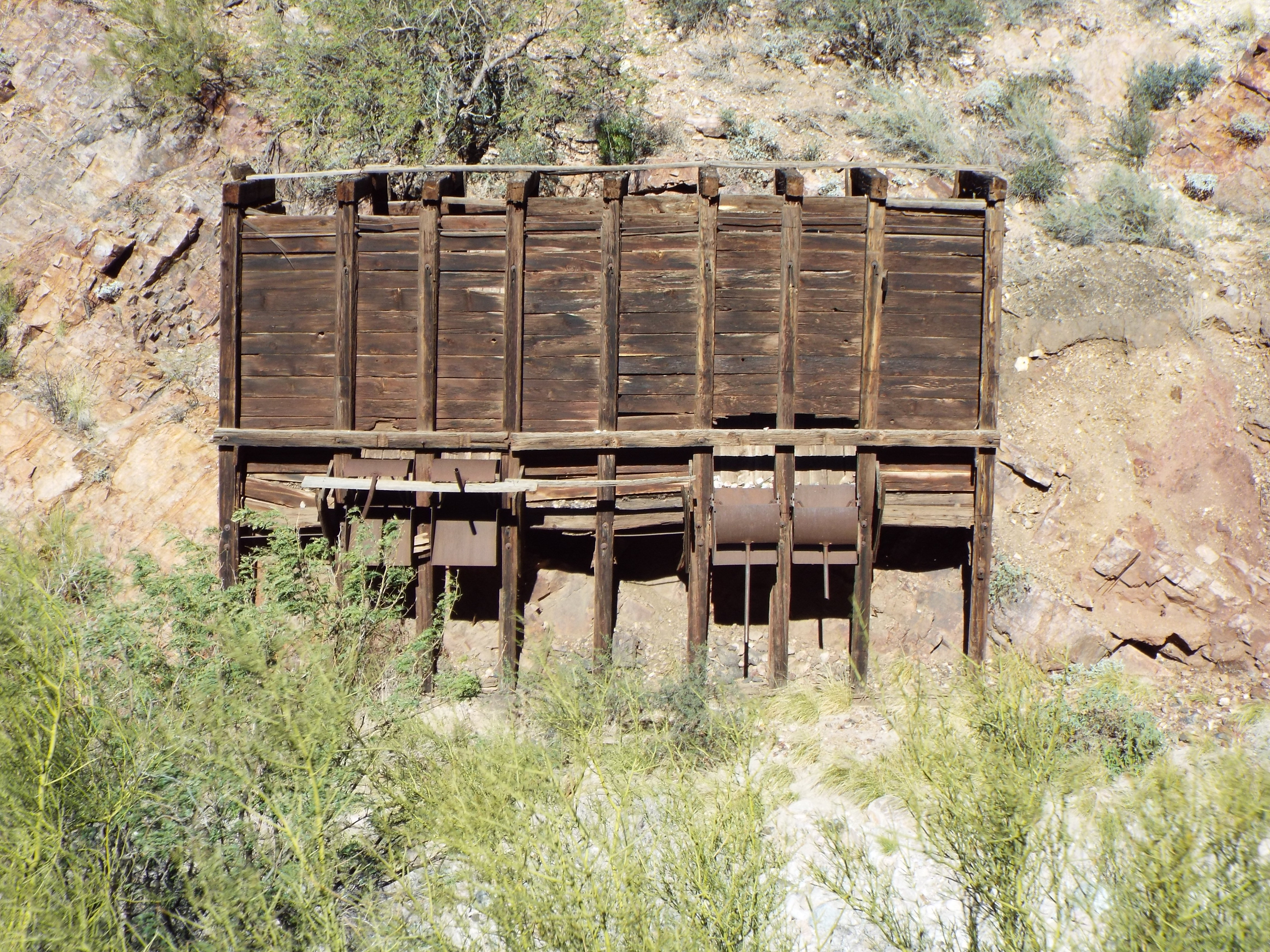
Old Magma Mine Ore Bin

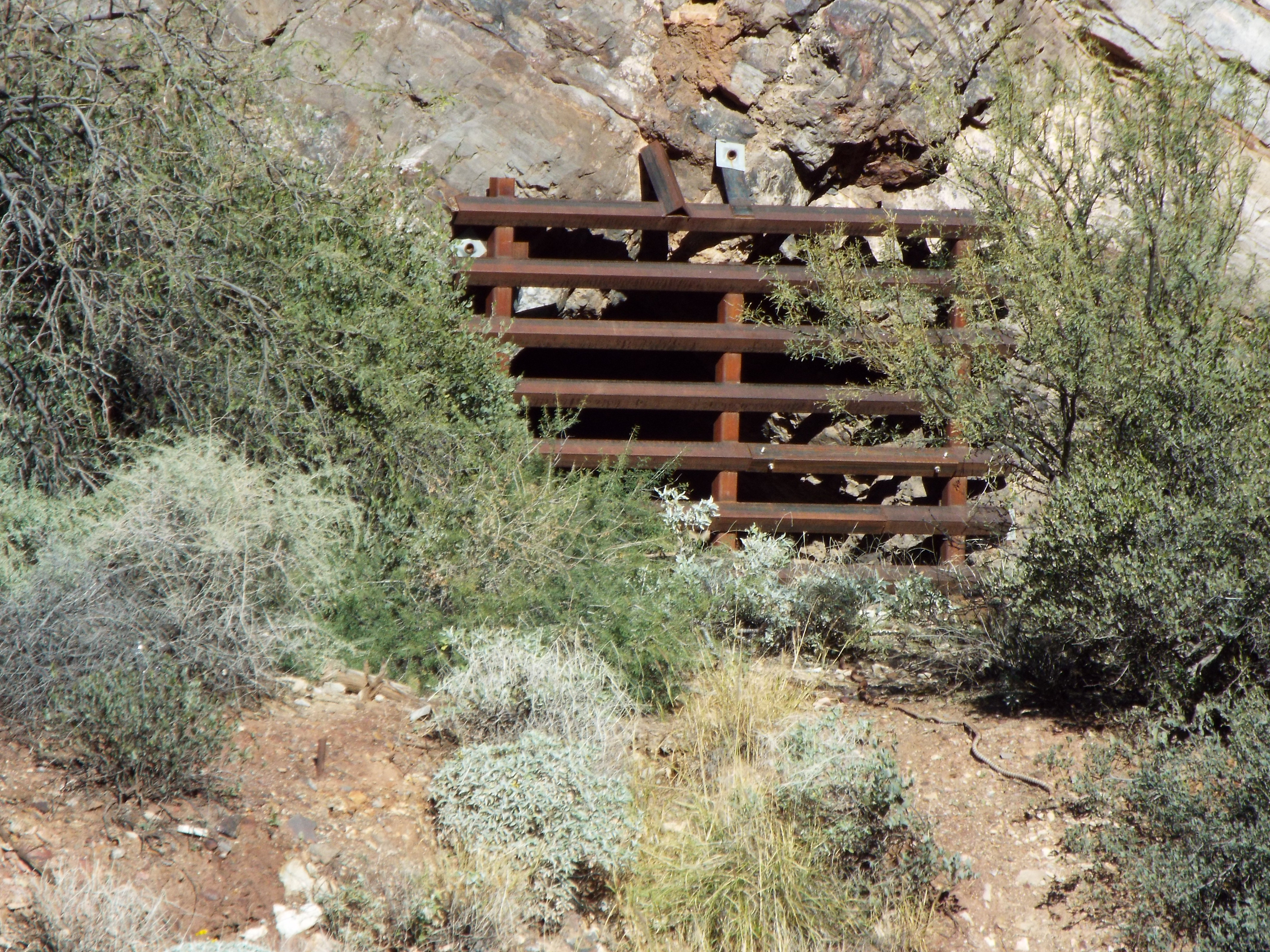
Magma Mine – mine shaft

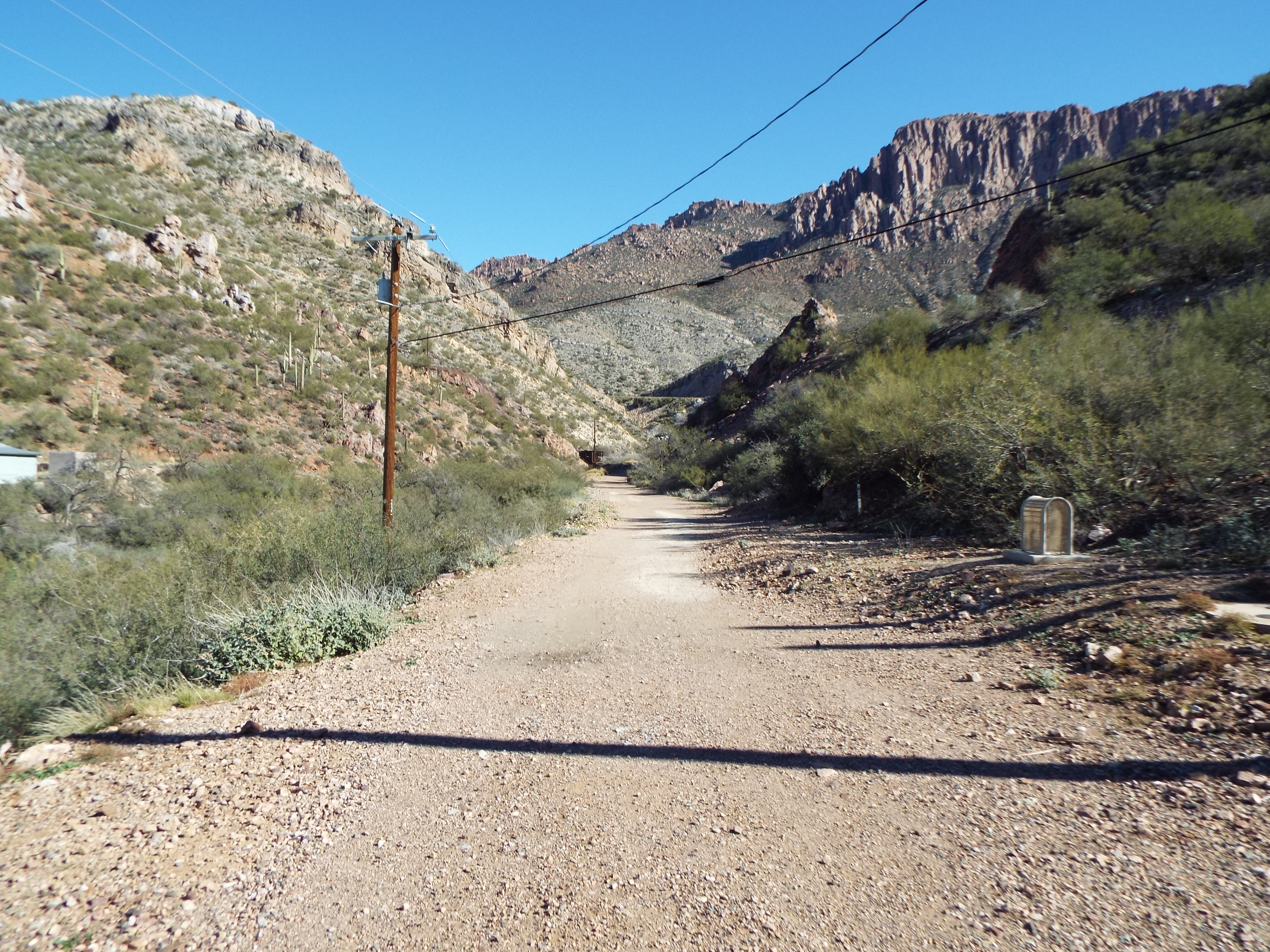
Old Highway Route 60

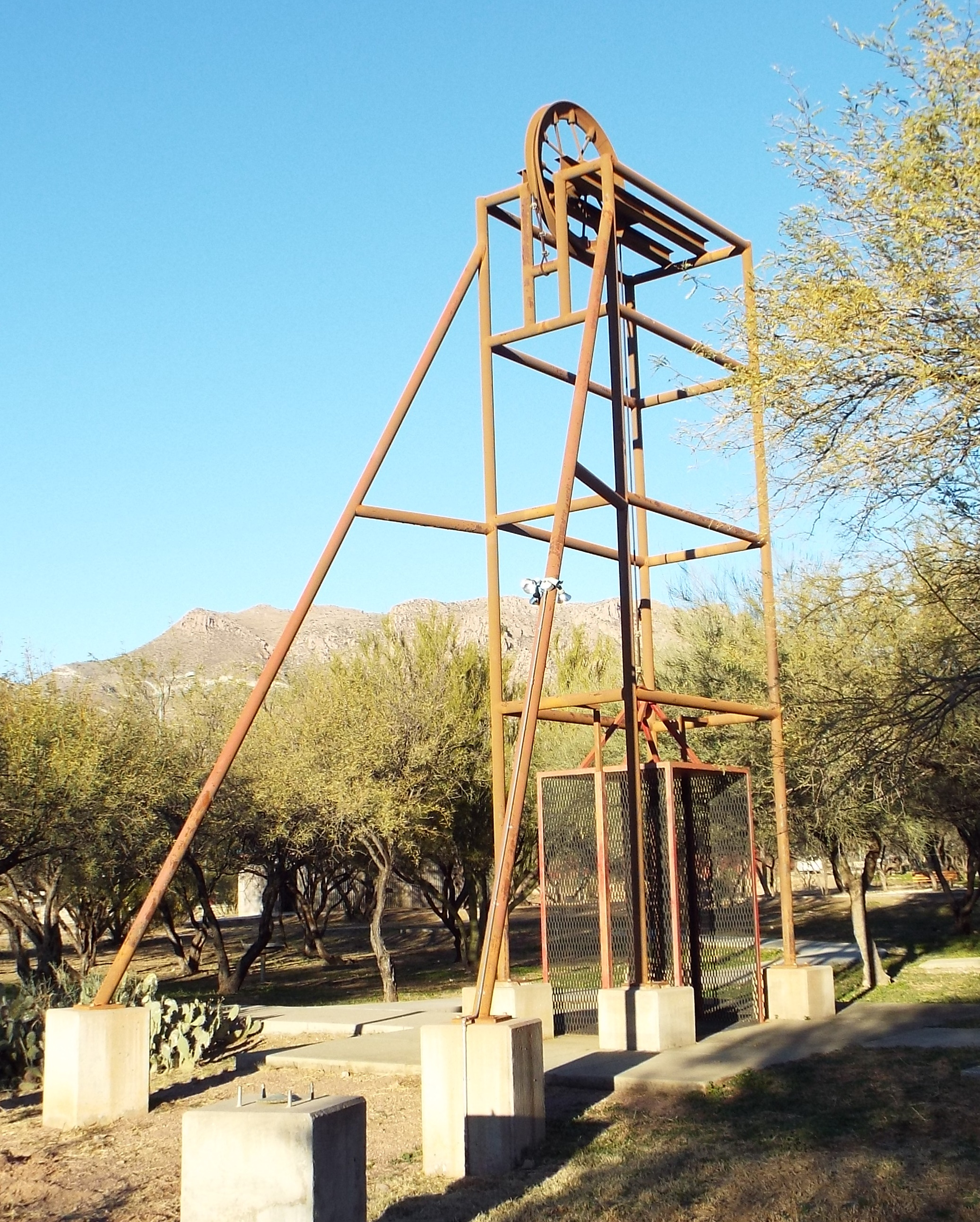
19th-century steam-powered elevator

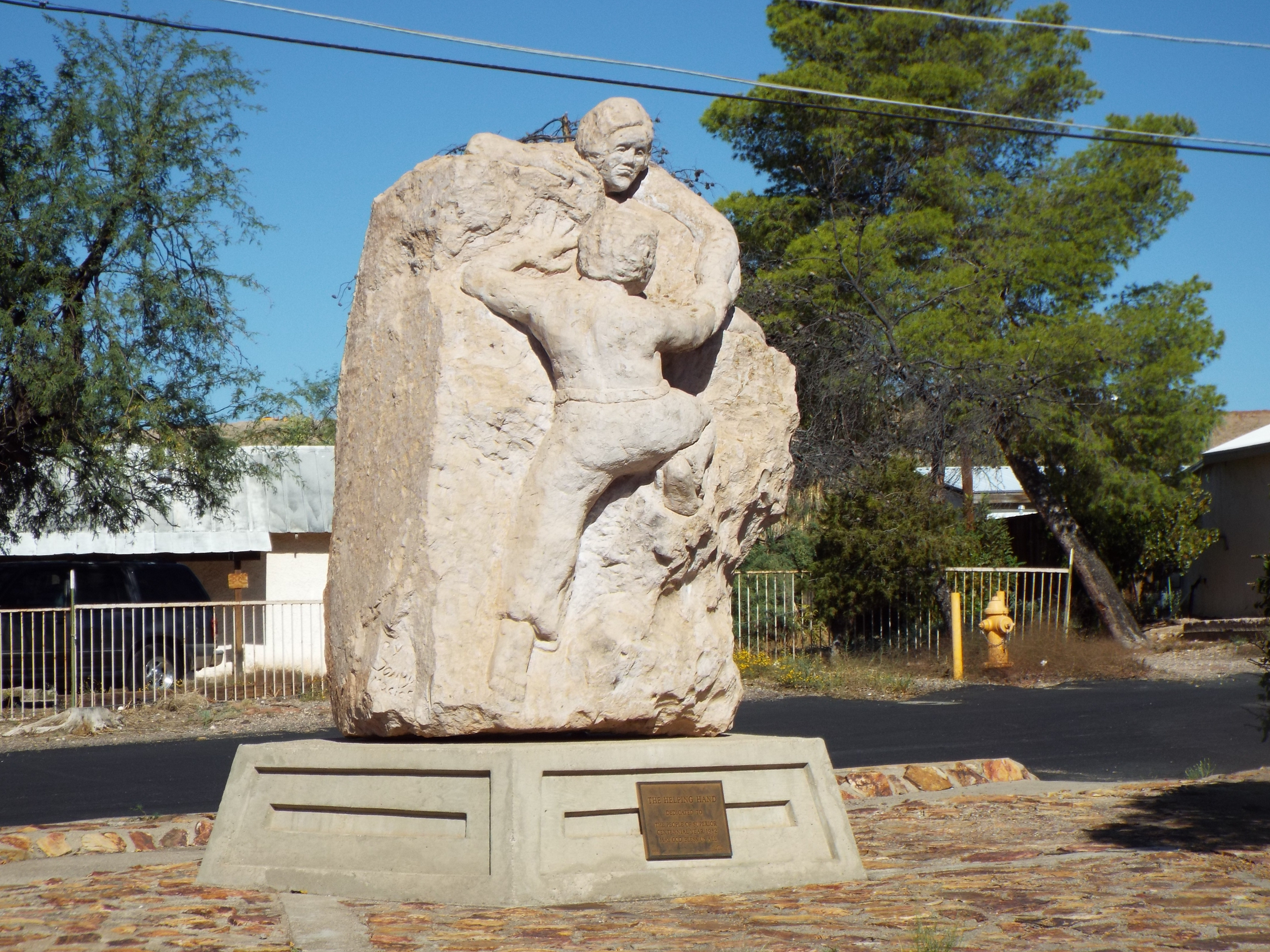
Helping Hand Plaza

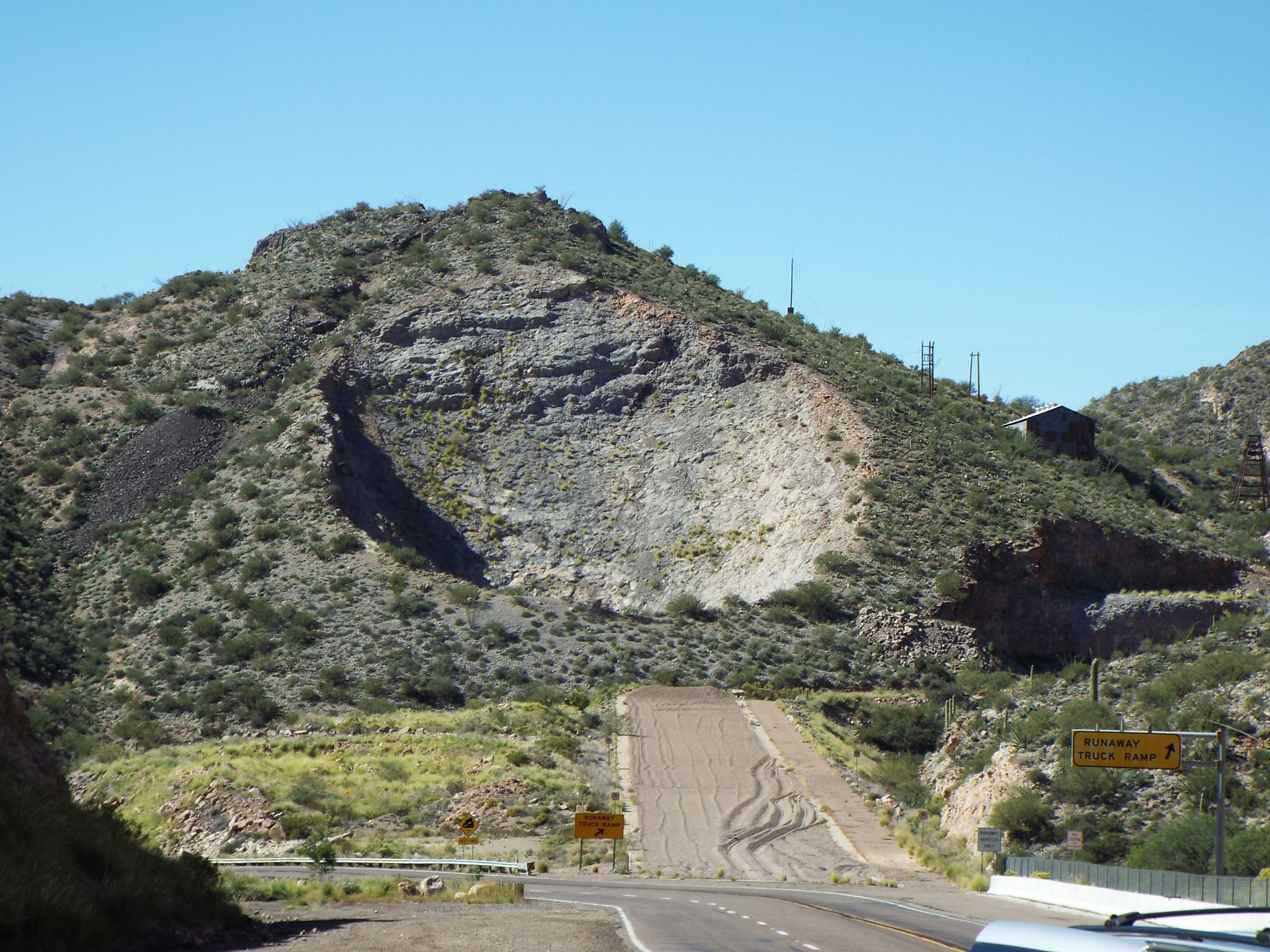
Resolution Copper Project at Apache Leap Mt.

== Superior History Trail ==
The Caboose Park and Superior History Trail is located at 834 W. Highway 60. The Superior Ore Cart was installed just in time for the ribbon cutting and dedication ceremony of the park and trail on April 25, 2015. Three of the main trails are the U.S. 60 History Trail, the Mining History Trail and the Copper Corridor Ore Cart Trail. Among the open air displays are some of the equipment once used by in the Magma Mine. The Red Caboose is used as the Chamber of Commerce Visitor Center. Pictured are the following:

- The Red Caboose which serves as the Visitor Center of the Chamber of Commerce of Superior.
- Equipment once used in the Magma Mine.
- A 19th-century steam powered elevator which was once used in the Magma Mine.
- The replica of a mine shaft entrance.
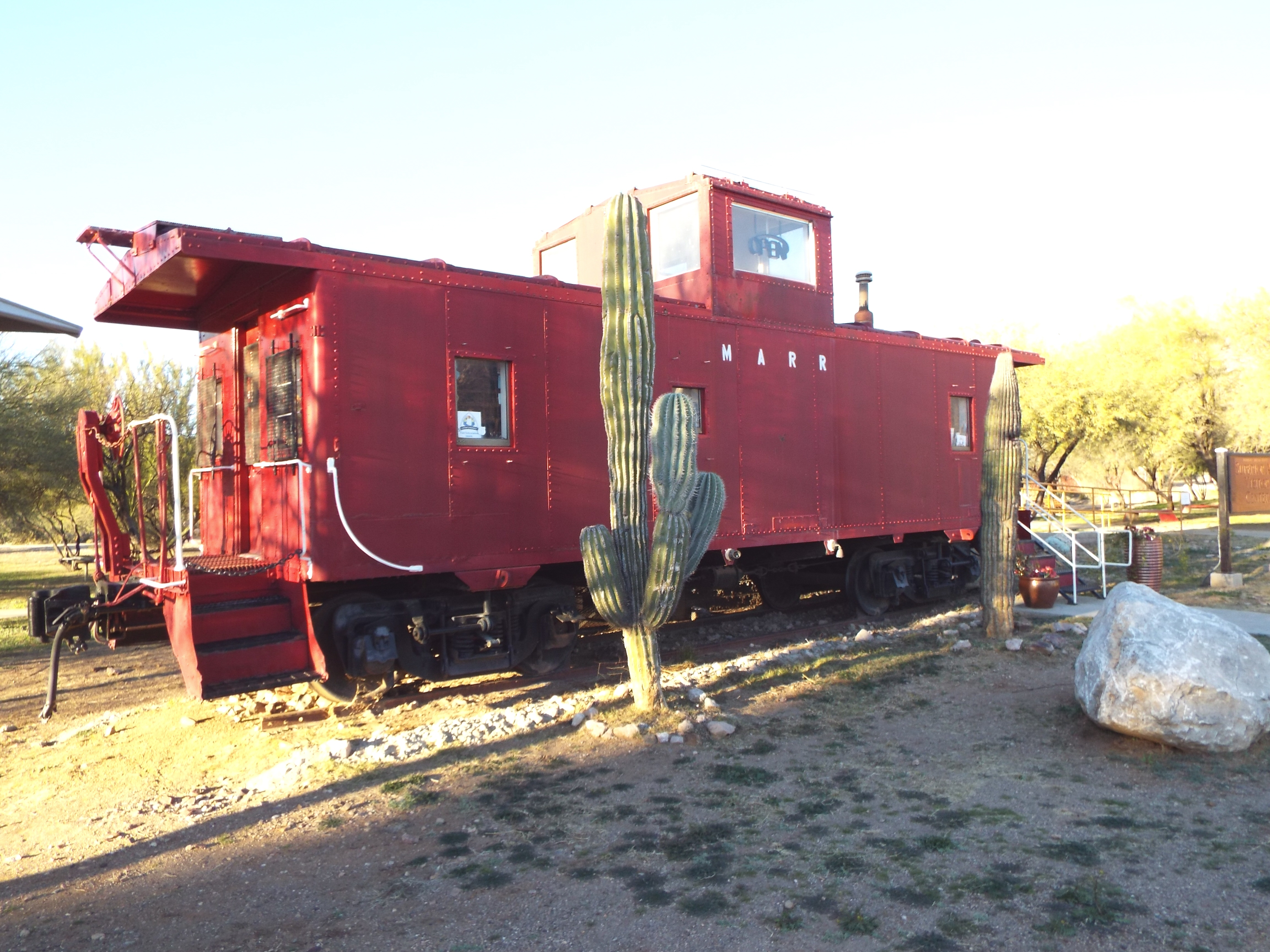
Red Caboose

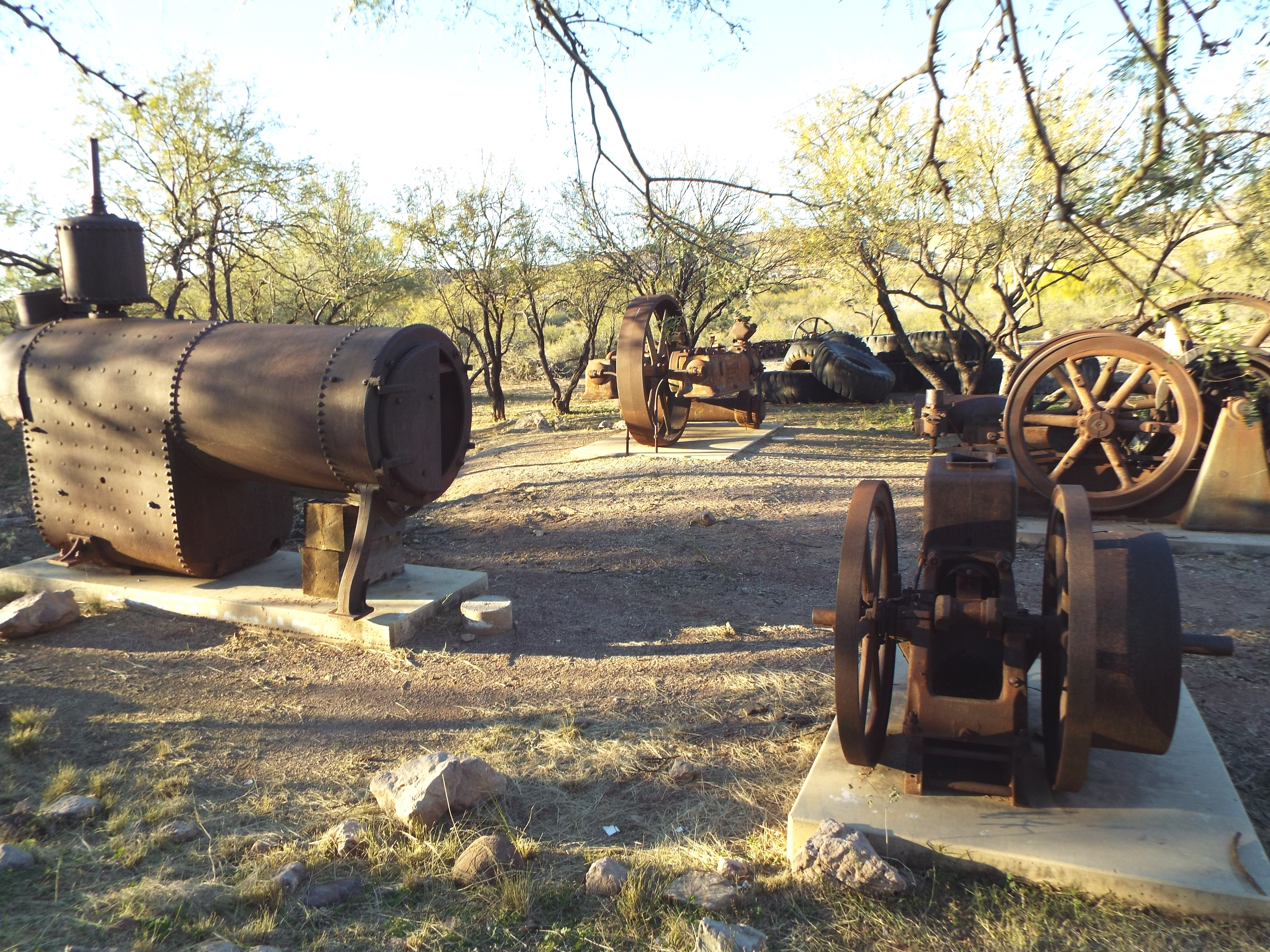
Mining equipment

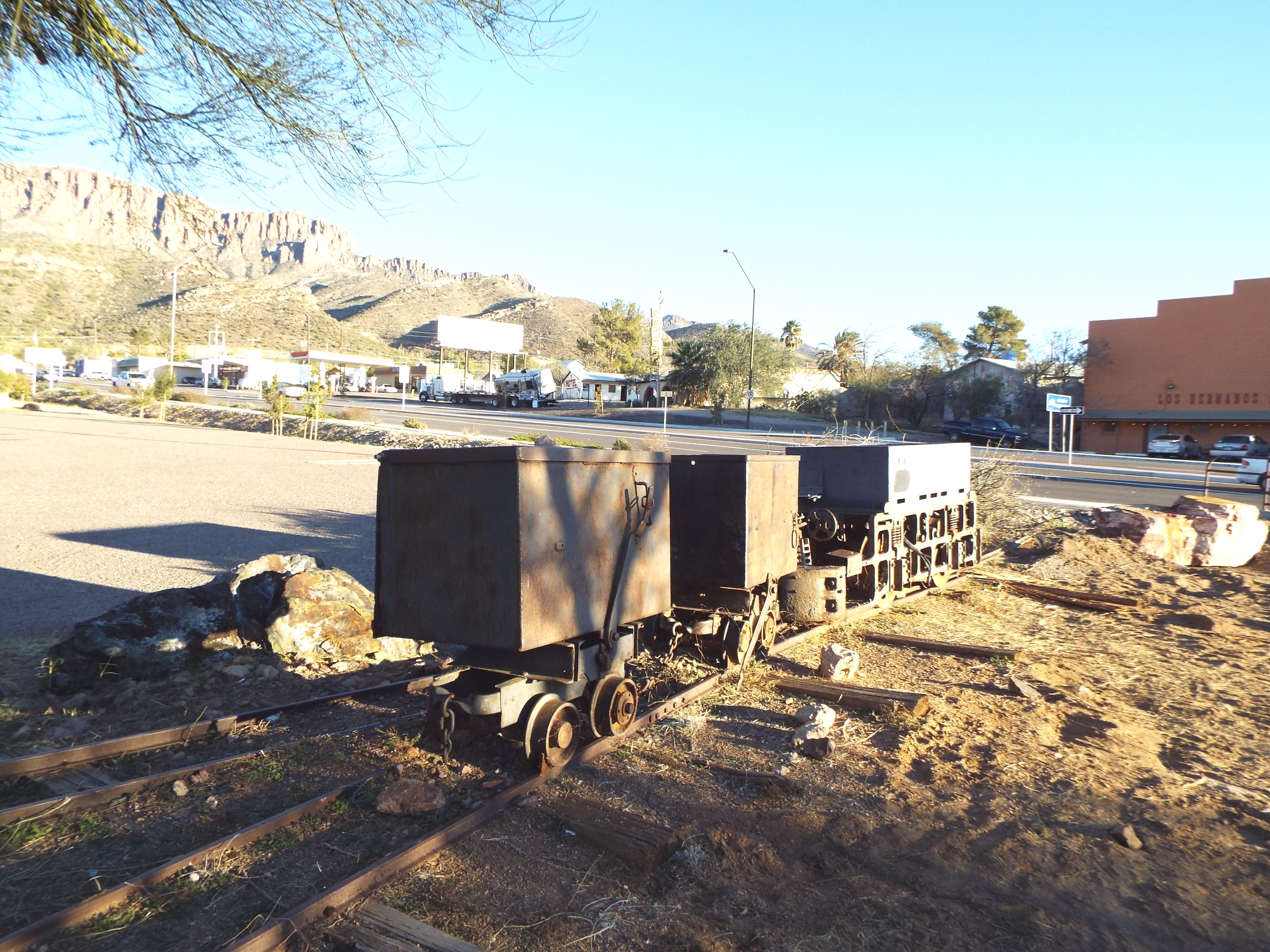
Mining equipment

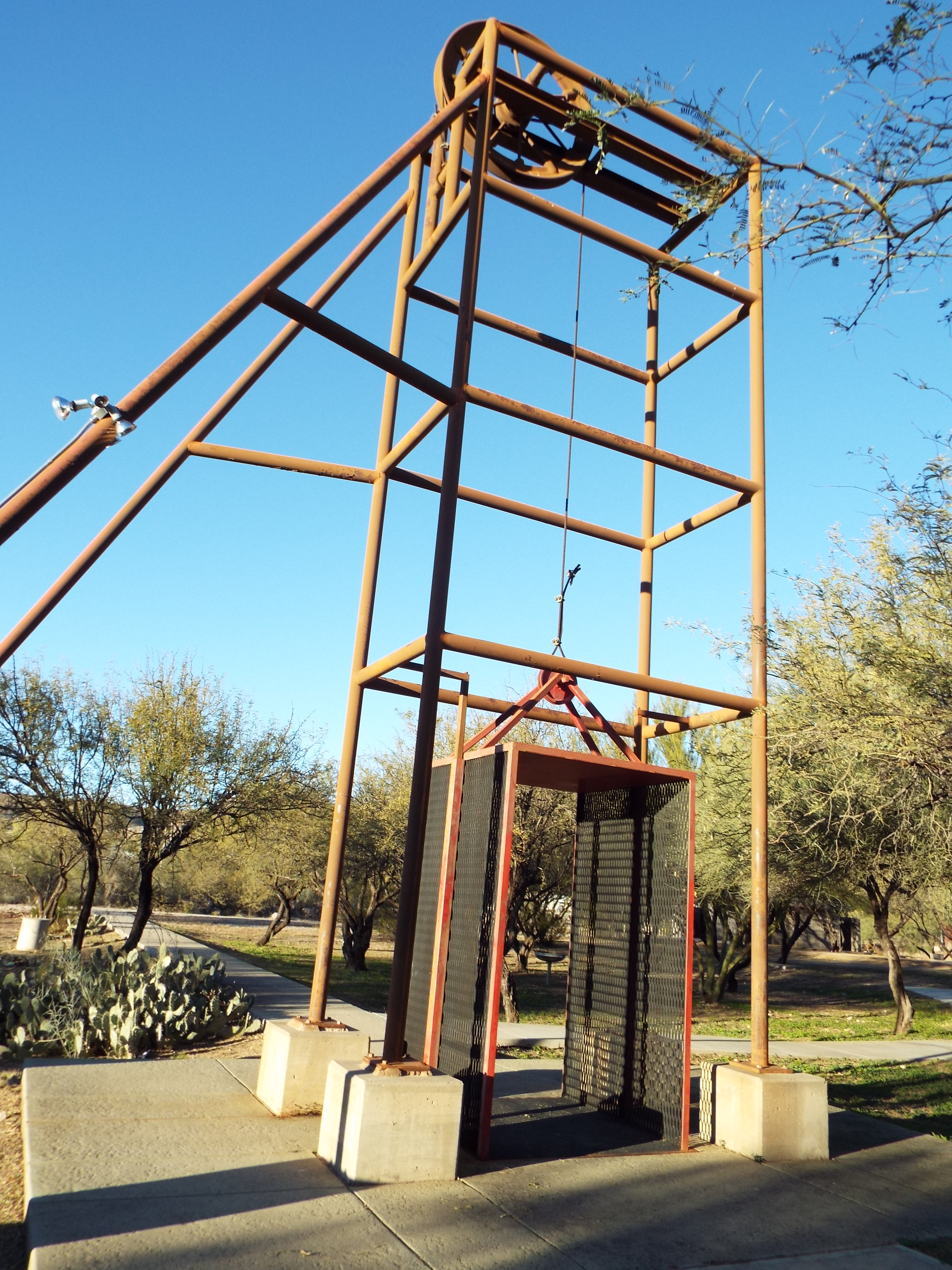
Steam-powered elevator

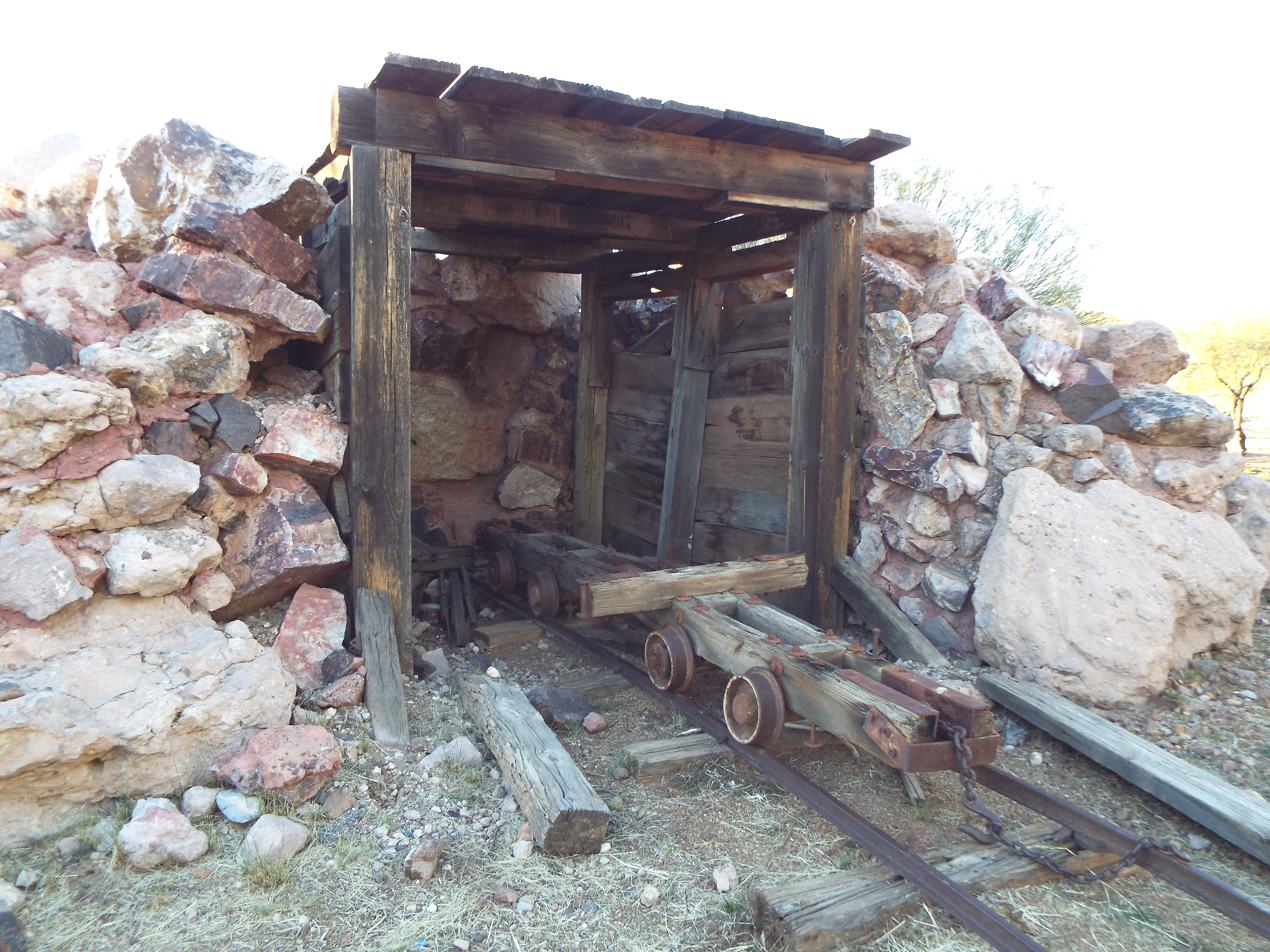
Replica of a mine shaft

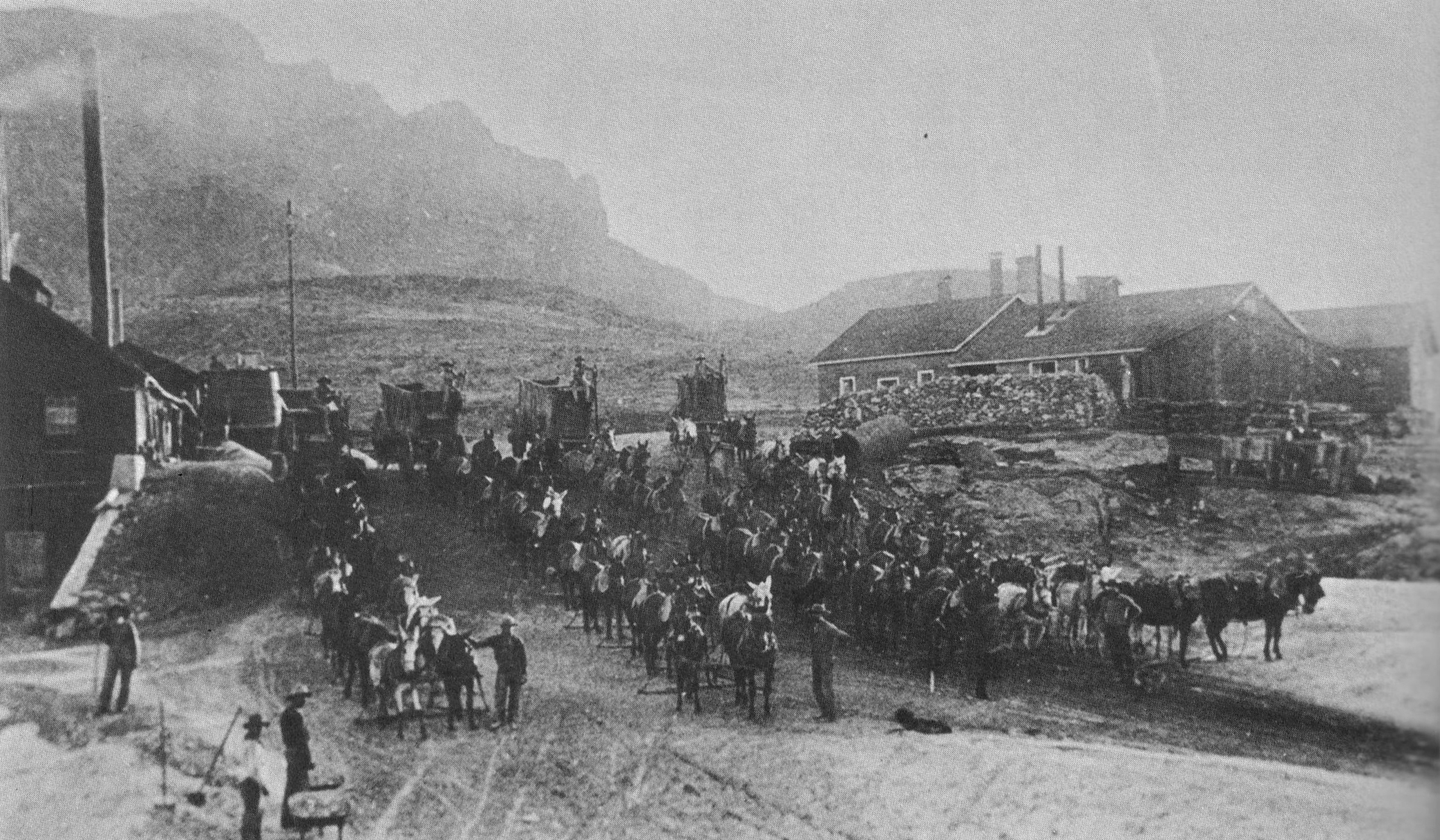
Ore wagon trains hauling the ore from the Silver King Mine to Pinal City. Wagon trains such as these made the historical Wagon Wheel Tracks in Pinal City

== Pinal City ==
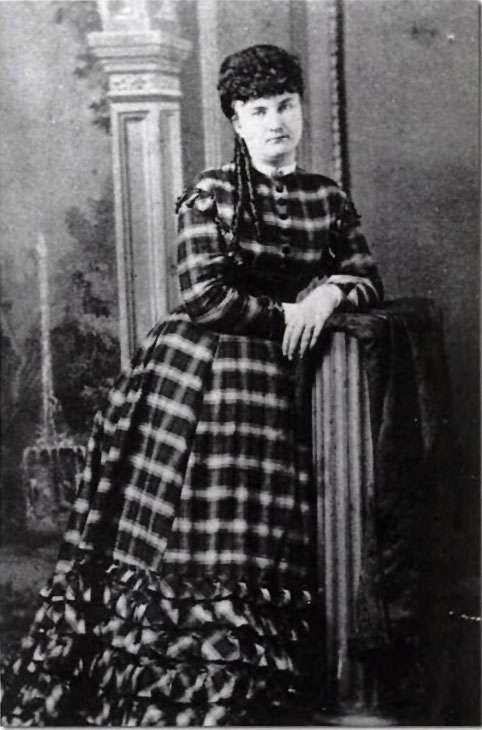
Celia Ann “Mattie” Blaylock Earp

Silver was discovered about 1 mile west of Kings Crown Peak in the fall of 1874 and initially worked until March 24, 1875. The mine which became known as the Silver King Mine was located about 3 miles north of Superior. A direct result of this discovery was the establishment in 1878, of Pinal City which quickly became a boom town of about two thousand residents. General George Stoneman established a military post by the base of the mountain close to Pinal City to protect the residents and the workers of the Silver King Mine from the Apaches. The post was named Picket Post and thus, the mountain in question became known as the Picket Post Mountain. The ores were initially crushed on-site by a Blake crusher and then transported by wagon trains whose ore carts were pulled by many mules to Pinal City. The tracks made by the wagon trains on the soft volcanic trail are still visible.

The Pinal Cemetery was established in 1878. Among those who are buried there are the following:

- Celia Ann “Mattie” Blaylock Earp (1850–1888) – Mattie was Wyatt Earp's common law wife. Wyatt abandoned her and she ended up living in Pinal City. However, she was unable to make a living and on July 3, 1888, she took a lethal dose of laudanum and alcohol. Her death was ruled as "suicide by opium poisoning".
- Manuelita Guzman (1844–1916) – Guzman was the matriarch of the Guzman family who have spanned over six generations in Superior.
- Annie Maria Weston (September 4, 1881) – She was the wife of J. E. Weston.

When the mine dried out, the economic situation in Pinal City worsened. The post office was closed on November 28, 1891 and the cemetery in 1892. The town was deserted shortly thereafter and is now considered a ghost town.

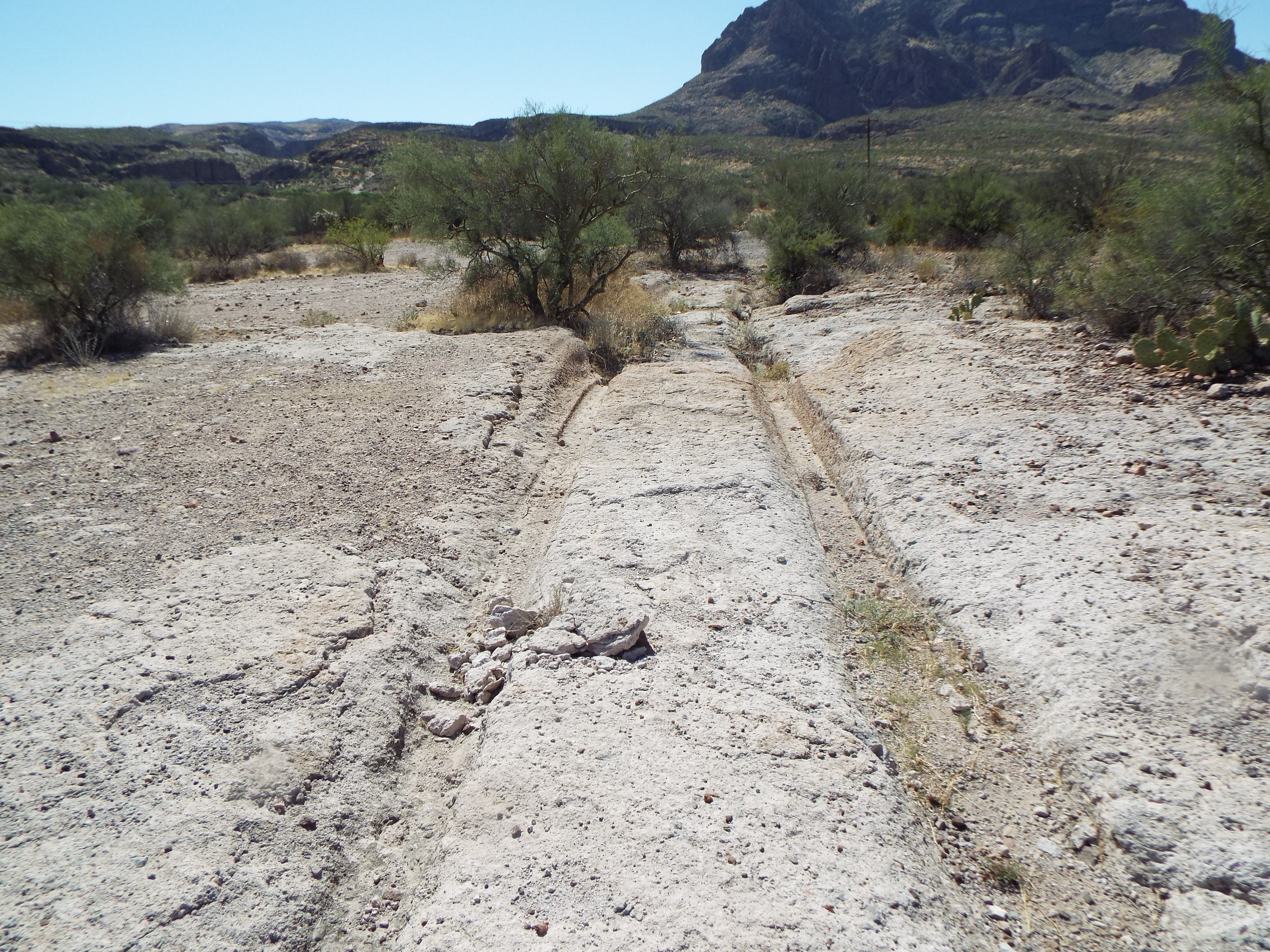
Wagon Wheel Tracks (1882) in Pinal City

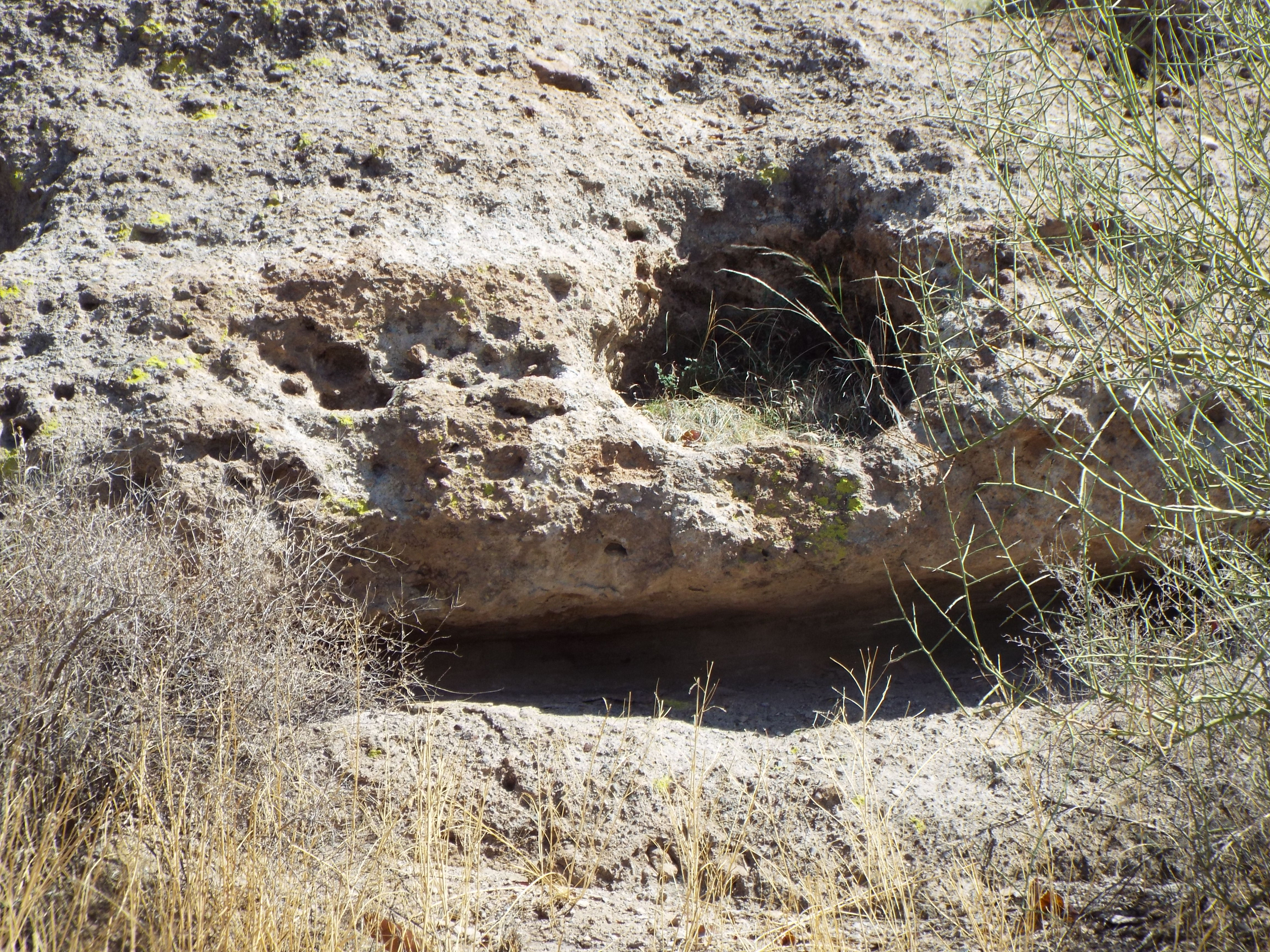
Gold cave in Pinal City

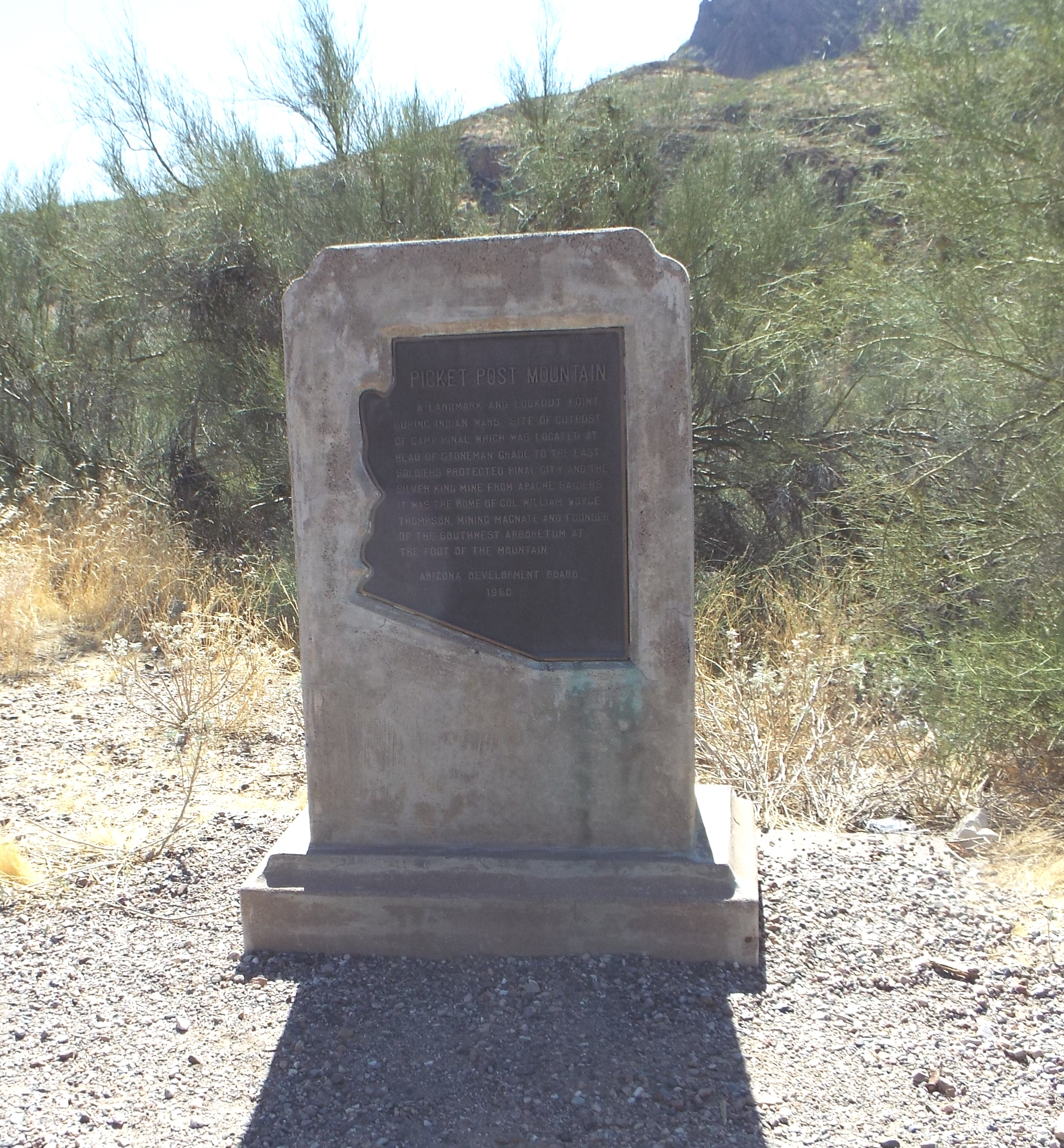
Picket Post Mountain Marker

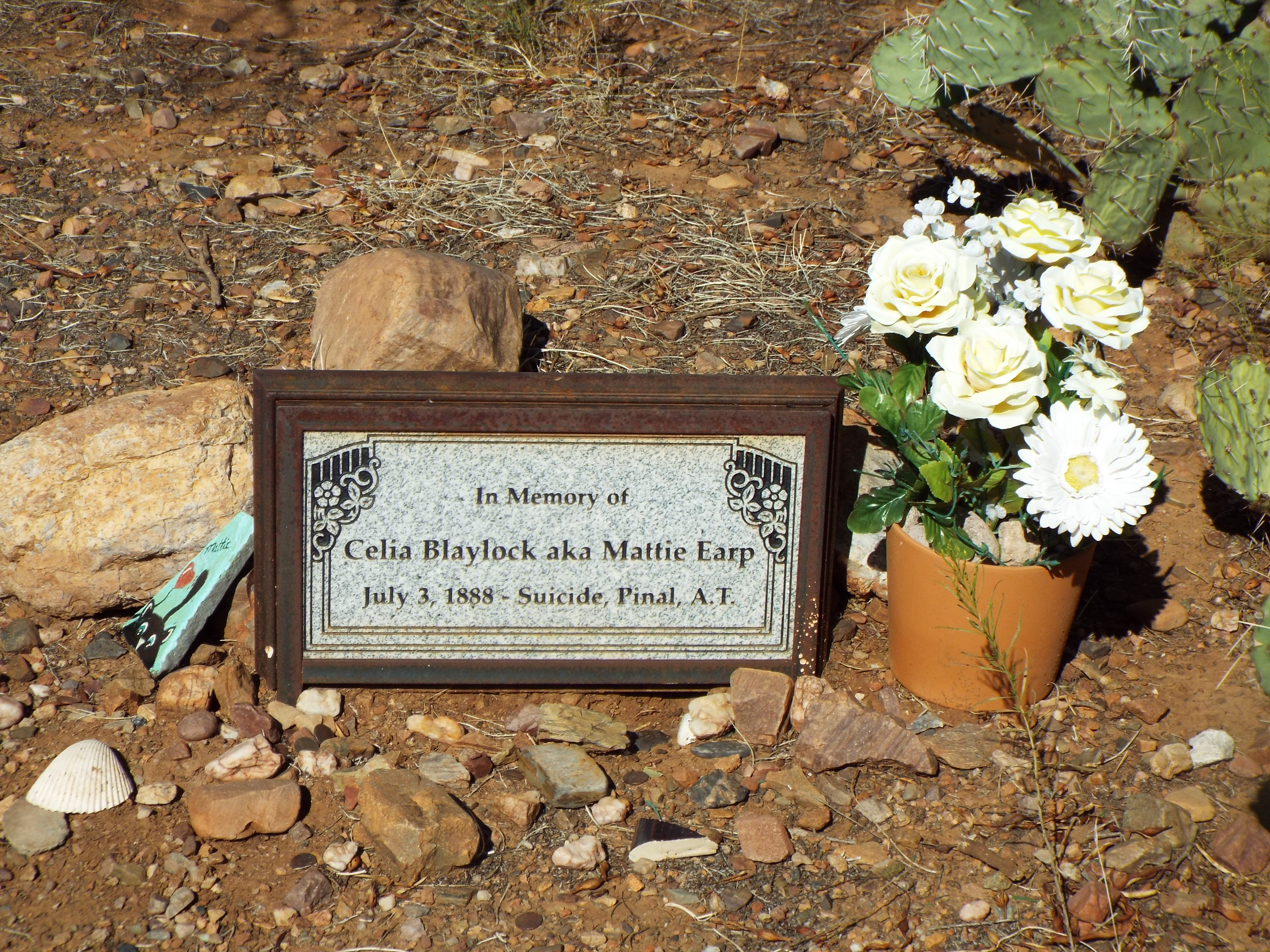
Grave-site of Ceilia Ann "Mattie" Blaylock Earp

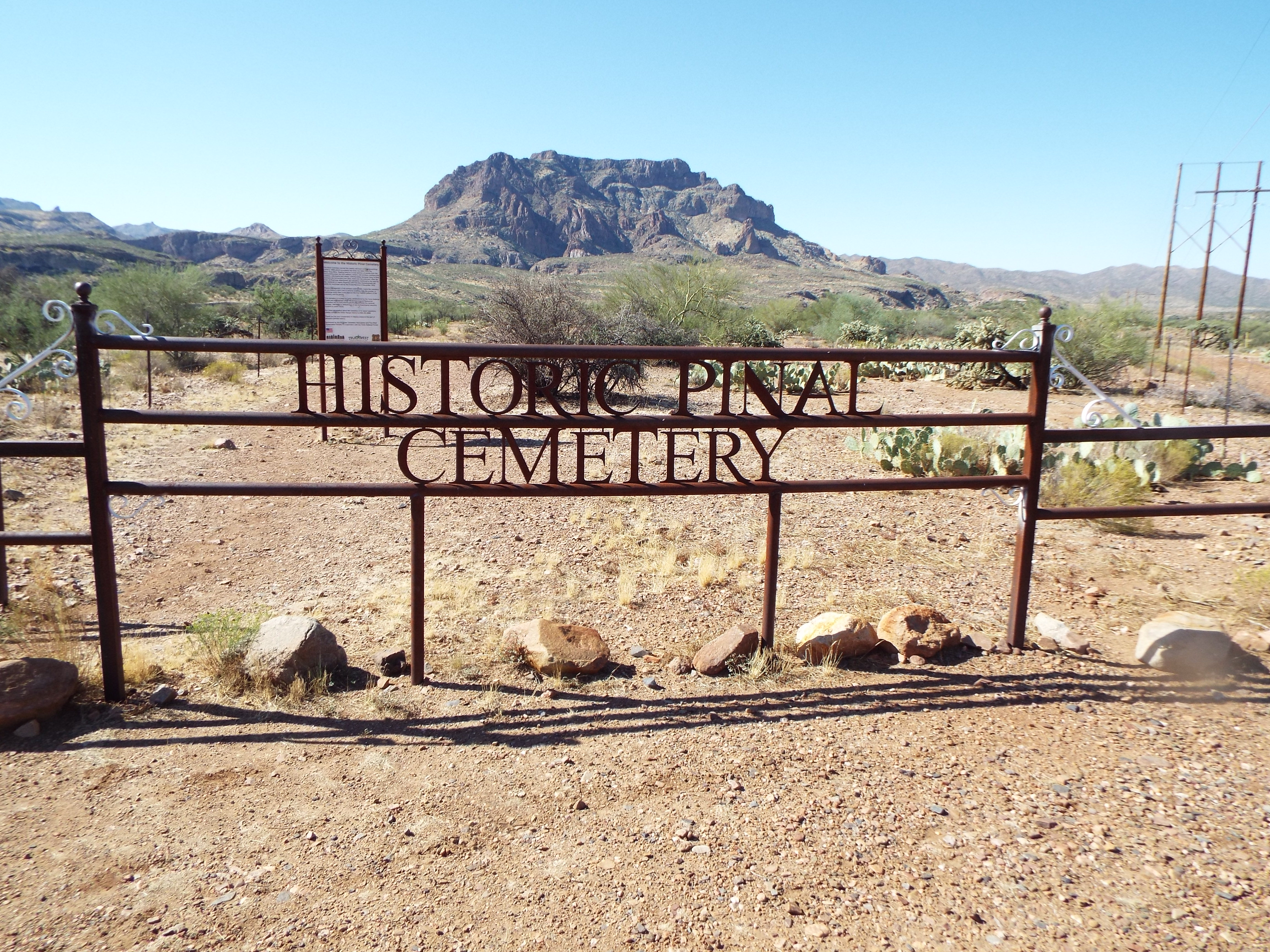
Historic Pinal Cemetery

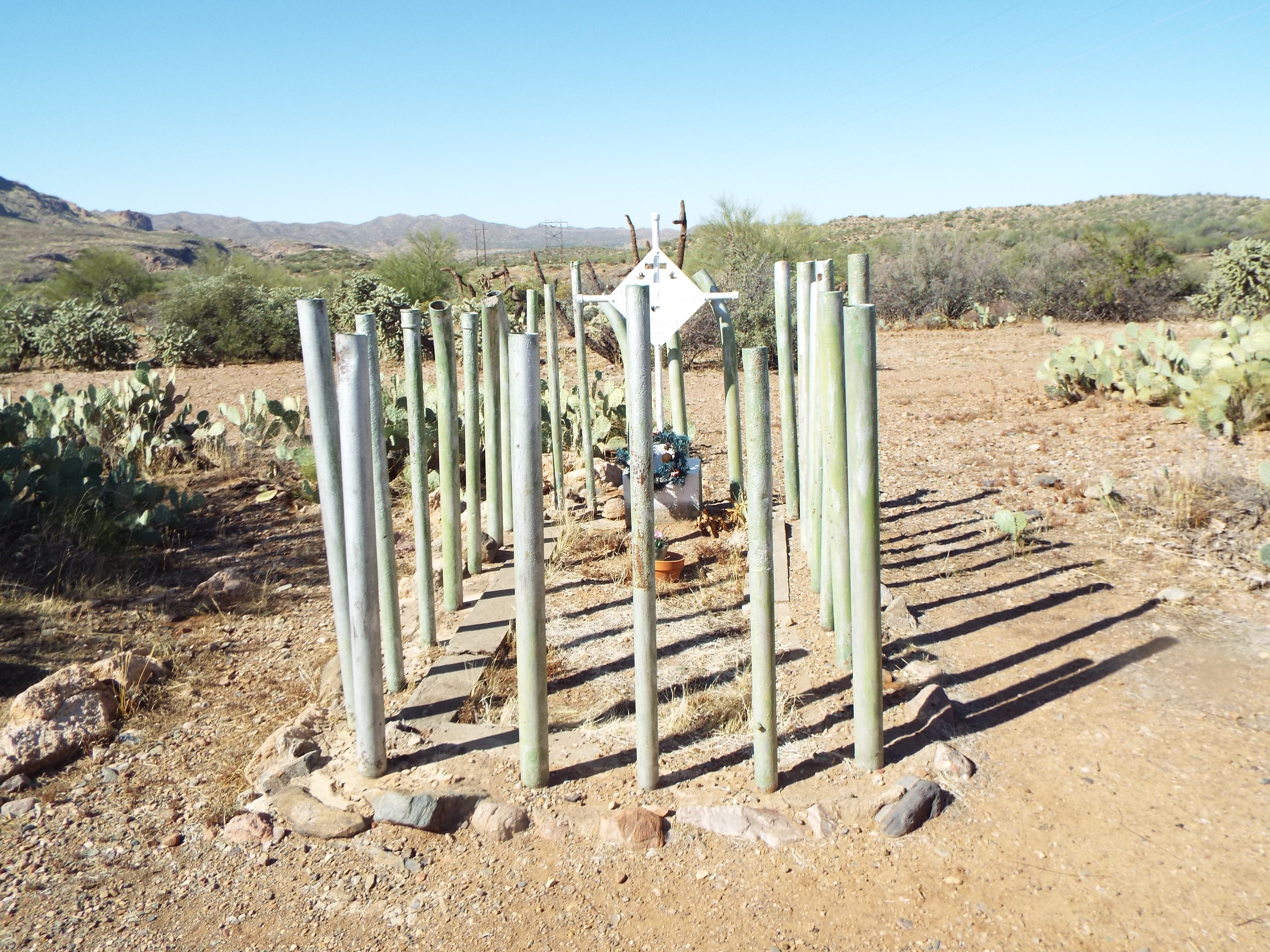
Grave-site of Manuelita Guzman

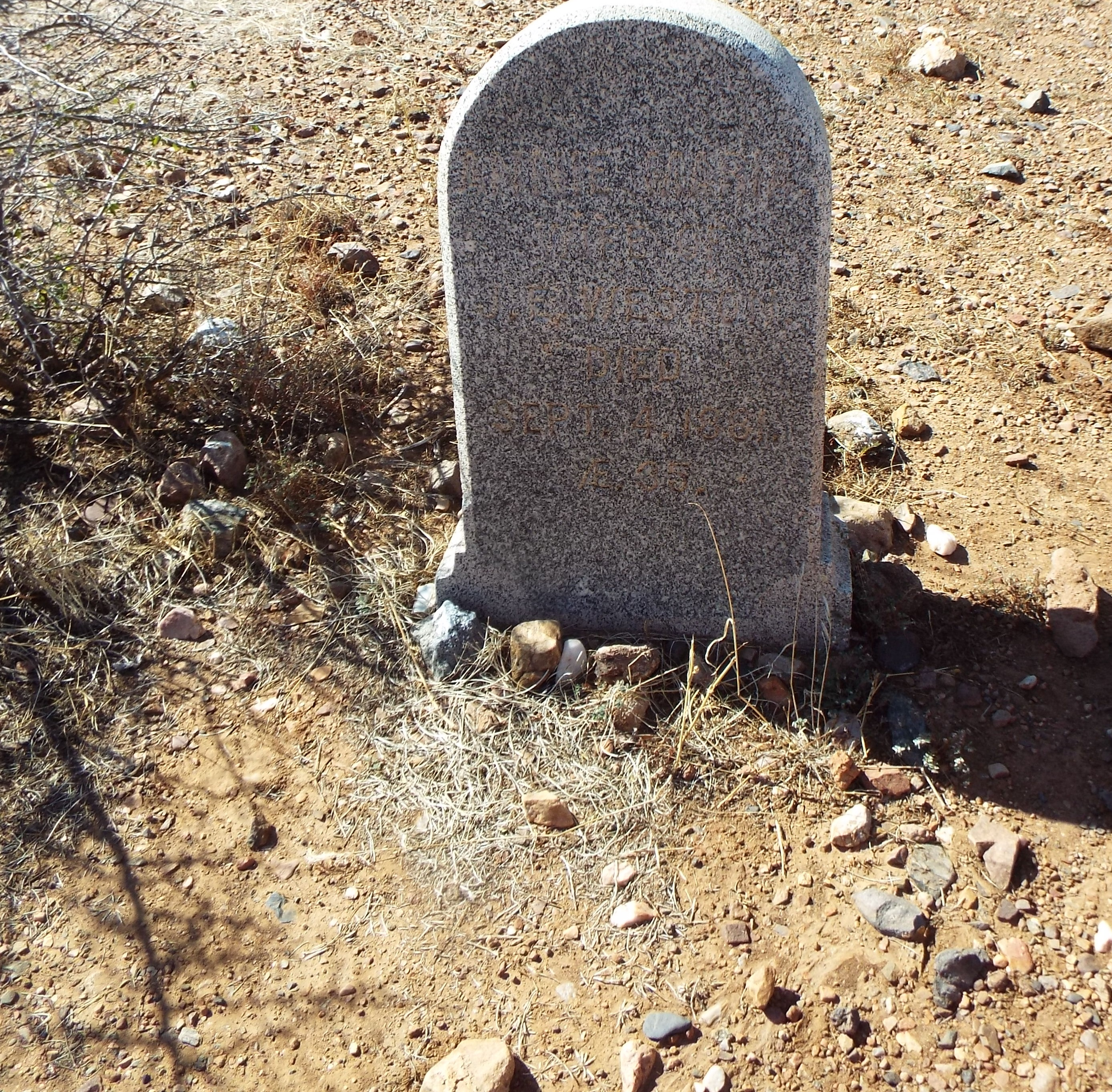
Grave-site of Annie Marie Weston

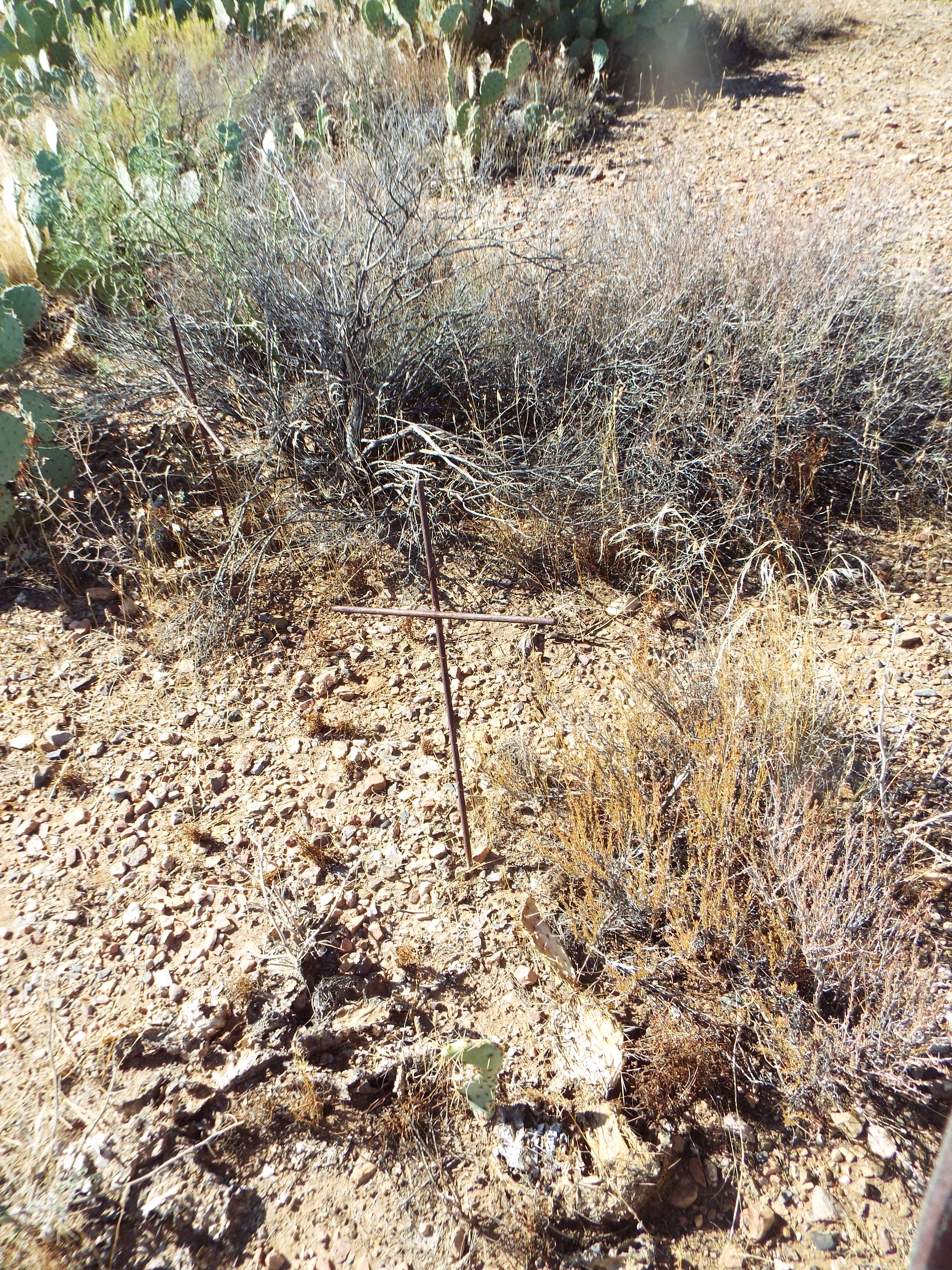
Unknown grave

== Boyce Thompson Arboretum State Park ==
The Boyce Thompson Arboretum is the largest and oldest botanical garden in the state of Arizona. The arboretum was founded in 1924, by William Boyce Thompson. In 1926, the Smith Building and two connecting greenhouses were built. The Arboretum is located on U.S. Highway 60 in the Sonoran Desert along Queen Creek and beneath the volcanic remnant, the Picketpost Mountain. The Boyce Thompson Arboretum State Park was listed in the National Register of Historic Places on March 26, 1976, reference: #76000381.

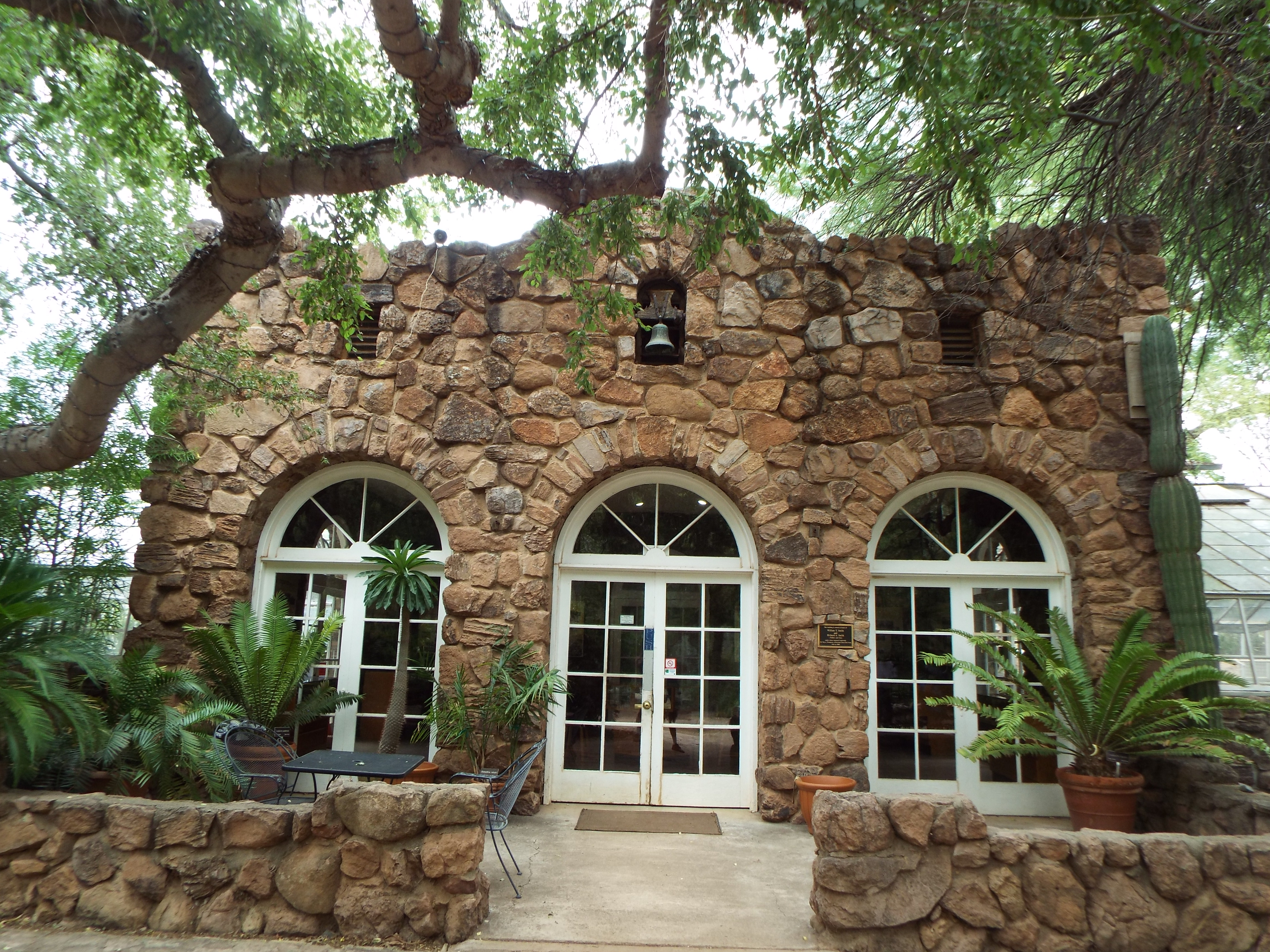
The Smith House – 1925

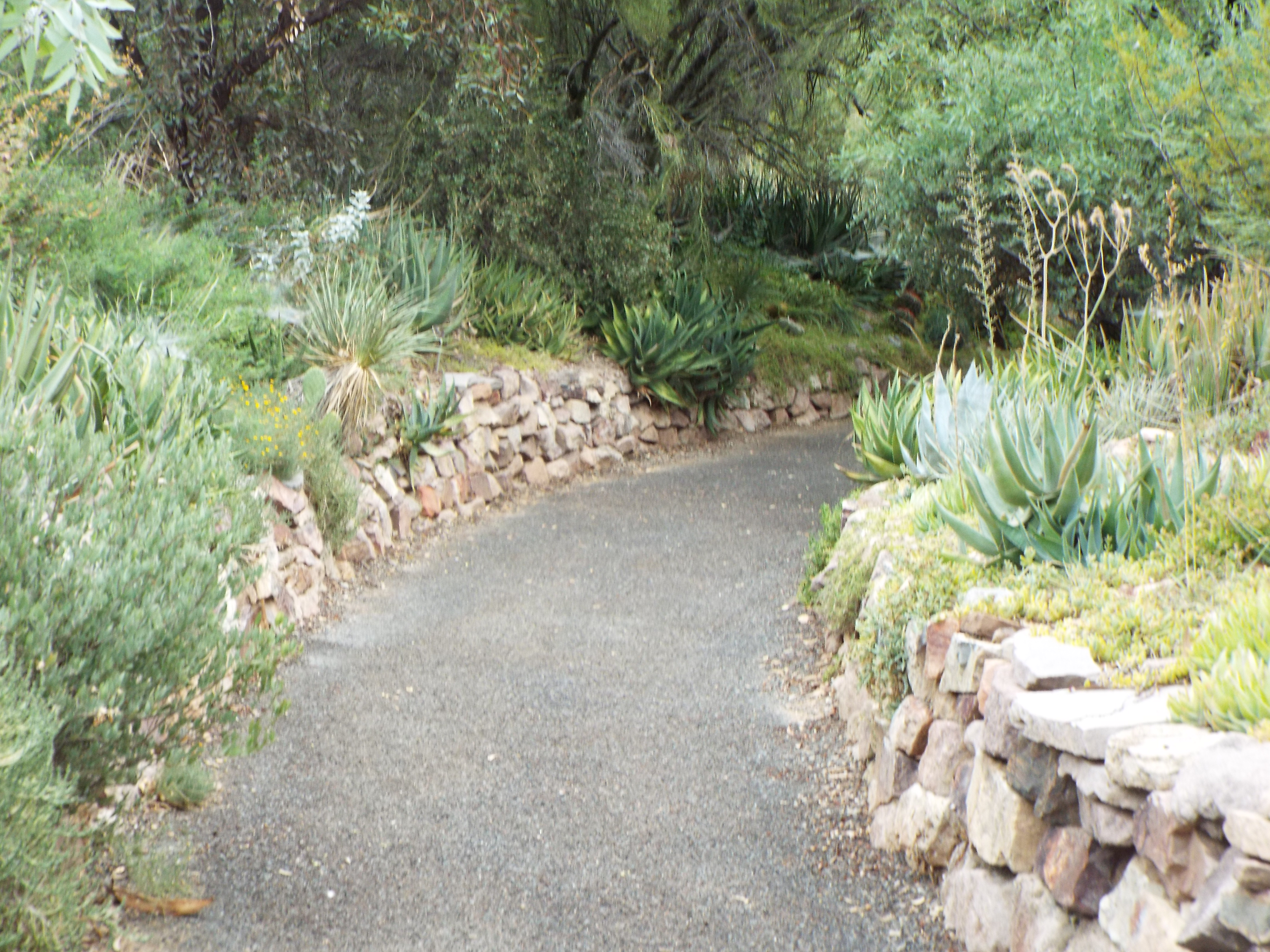
A trail

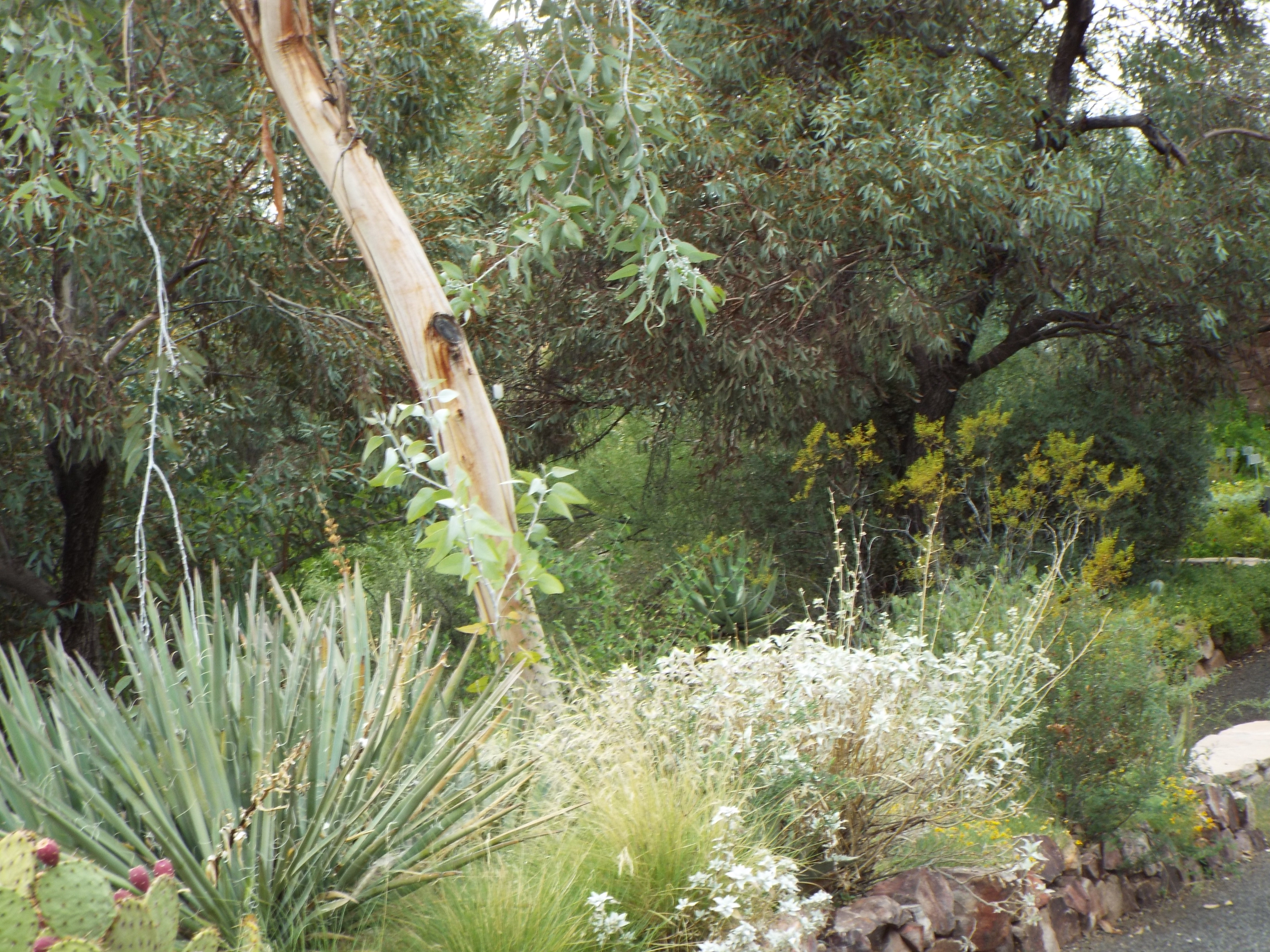
The Boyce Thompson Arboretum

== See also ==
- Superior, Arizona
- National Register of Historic Places listings in Pinal County, Arizona
