= Rhopalocarpus louvelii =

Conservation status
- Least Concern (IUCN 3.1)

Scientific classification
- Kingdom: Plantae
- Clade: Tracheophytes
- Clade: Angiosperms
- Clade: Eudicots
- Clade: Rosids
- Order: Malvales
- Family: Sphaerosepalaceae
- Genus: Rhopalocarpus
- Species: R. louvelii

Binomial name
- Rhopalocarpus louvelii (Danguy) Capuron

Synonyms
- Sphaerosepalum louvelii Danguy

Species of tree

Rhopalocarpus louvelii is a tree in the family Sphaerosepalaceae. It is endemic to Madagascar.

== Distribution and habitat ==
Rhopalocarpus louvelii is a widespread species in Madagascar. Its habitat is both dry and wet forests from sea-level to 1,500 m (5,000 ft) altitude. Some populations are within protected areas.

== Threats ==
Rhopalocarpus louvelii is threatened by shifting patterns of agriculture, resulting in deforestation. Because the species is used as timber, subsistence harvesting is also a threat.
