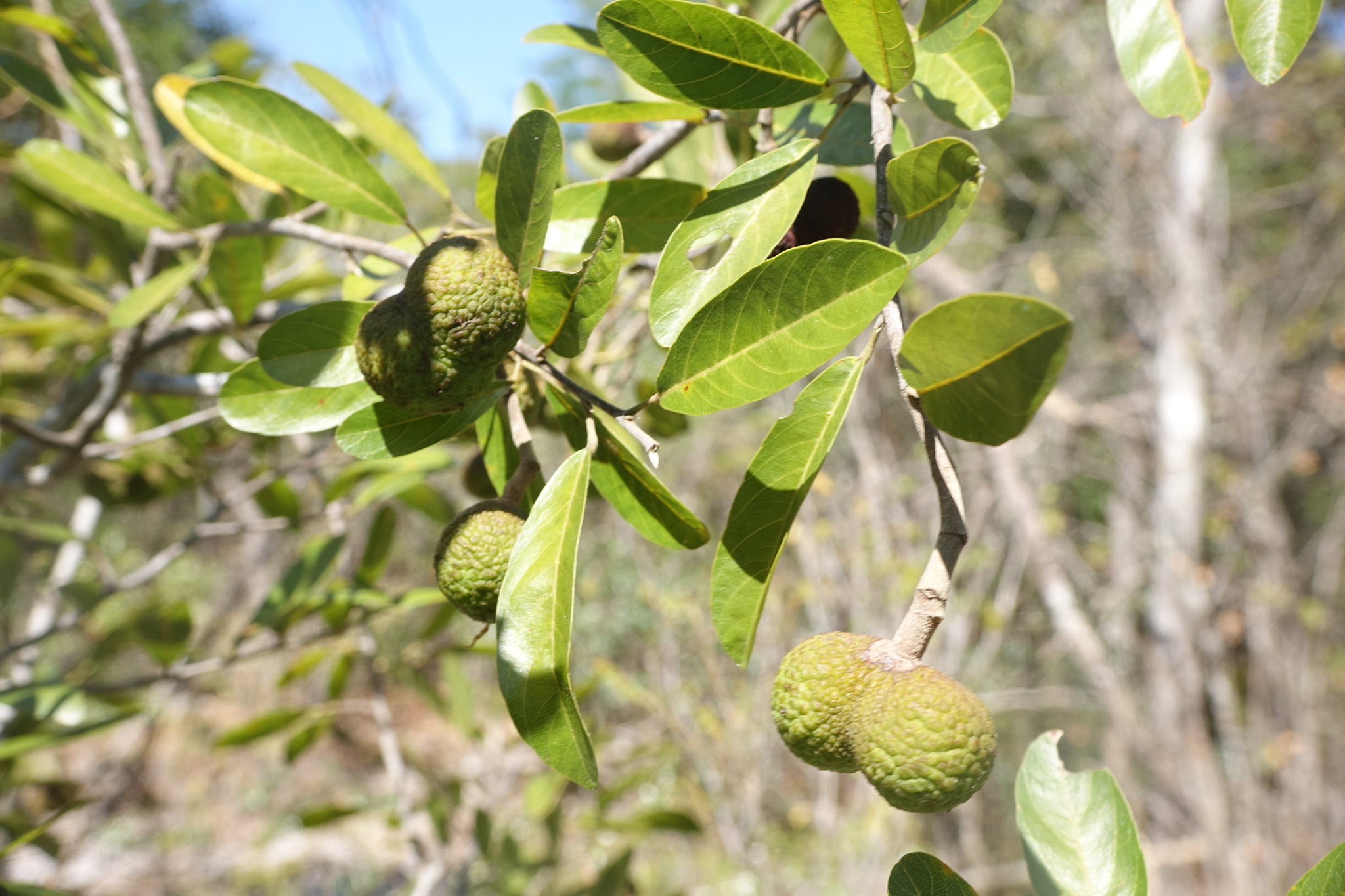

Conservation status
- Least Concern (IUCN 3.1)

Scientific classification
- Kingdom: Plantae
- Clade: Tracheophytes
- Clade: Angiosperms
- Clade: Eudicots
- Clade: Rosids
- Order: Malvales
- Family: Sphaerosepalaceae
- Genus: Rhopalocarpus
- Species: R. similis

Binomial name
- Rhopalocarpus similis Hemsl.

Synonyms
- Rhopalocarpus madagascariense Danguy

= Rhopalocarpus similis =

Species of flowering plant

Rhopalocarpus similis is a tree in the family Sphaerosepalaceae. It is endemic to Madagascar.

== Distribution and habitat ==
Rhopalocarpus similis is a widespread species in Madagascar. Its habitat is both dry and wet forests and thickets from sea level to 1,500 m (5,000 ft) altitude.

== Conservation ==
Rhopalocarpus similis has been assessed as least concern on the IUCN Red List. It is threatened by shifting patterns of agriculture, resulting in deforestation. Because the species is used as timber and firewood, subsistence harvesting is also a threat. Wildfires also pose a threat. However, the species is present in a number of protected areas including Ankarafantsika, Namoroka, Zombitse-Vohibasia and Isalo national parks.

== Uses ==
Rhopalocarpus similis is harvested for timber and firewood. It is used in local medicine in the treatment of post-labour pain.
