= Dialyceras coriaceum =

Conservation status
- Vulnerable (IUCN 3.1)

Scientific classification
- Kingdom: Plantae
- Clade: Tracheophytes
- Clade: Angiosperms
- Clade: Eudicots
- Clade: Rosids
- Order: Malvales
- Family: Sphaerosepalaceae
- Genus: Dialyceras
- Species: D. coriaceum

Binomial name
- Dialyceras coriaceum (Capuron) J.-F.Leroy

Synonyms
- Dialyceras parvifolium var. coriaceum Capuron

Species of flowering plant

Dialyceras coriaceum is a tree in the family Sphaerosepalaceae. It is endemic to Madagascar.

== Distribution and habitat ==
Dialyceras coriaceum is known only from populations in the northeastern regions of Sava, Analanjirofo and Atsinanana. Its habitat is humid evergreen forests from sea-level to 500 m (1,600 ft) altitude. Some populations are within protected areas.

== Threats ==
Dialyceras coriaceum is threatened by cyclones and shifting patterns of agriculture. Because lemurs disperse the tree's seeds, threats to the lemur would in turn affect the tree's reproduction.
