= Rose E. Collom =

American botanist (1870–1956)

- Born: Rose Eudora Wilson; 1870; Georgia
- Died: 1956 (aged 85–86)
- Education: Lindenwood College
- Known for: Botanist of the Grand Canyon National Park
- Spouse: Wilbert B. Collom
- Awards: Arizona Women's Hall of Fame
- Scientific career
- Fields: Botany

Rose Eudora Collom (née Wilson; 20 December 1870 – 26 December 1956) was an American botanist and plant collector. She was the first paid botanist of the Grand Canyon National Park. She discovered several plant species, some of which were named in her honor, and collected numerous plant specimens.

== Early life and education ==
Collom was born in Georgia and trained as a teacher, attending Lindenwood College from 1886 to 1889. She married Wilbert B. Collom on 15 November 1907 in Phoenix, Arizona.

== Plant collecting ==
She became interested in Arizona flora when she moved to Gila County with her husband in 1914. They lived in an isolated area in the foothills of the Mazatzal Mountains where her husband worked a mine on the Collom property.

An article in the Arizona Producer quotes her as saying "I thought I would go crazy at first. My husband spent his days working the mine; beyond cooking his meals and mending his clothes there was nothing for me to do except sit ... and gaze out over these hills." Collom was unintimidated by the "coyotes yelping on the ridges or a mountain lion screaming up the canyon". She began to take long walks and study the plants of her local area. While on these walks she collected seeds, cuttings and specimens. She ordered botany books to educate herself and began writing to renowned botanists such as Joseph Nelson Rose, Thomas Henry Kearney and Robert Hibbs Peebles. Self-taught, she became an expert on the plants of Arizona, as acknowledged by her fellow botanists.

Her plant collecting led her to discover several plants, previously unknown to science, that would eventually be named after her. Collom discovered and collected a number of plant specimens used to create the formal scientific description and scientific name of that particular type of plant. The holotype specimens she discovered and collected include Dudleya collomiae, Ranunculus collomiae and Galium collomiae. Dr John Thomas Howell of the California Academy of Sciences, when naming Galium Collomiae wrote, "It is a pleasure and honor to name this distinctive addition to the Arizona flora in honor of Mrs Rose Collom who has done so much critical field work in that state."

Her collected specimens are held in numerous herbaria in American and around the world including the United States National Herbarium, the Lois Porter Earle Herbarium at the Desert Botanical Garden and the Arizona State University Herbarium. Other institutions that hold her specimens include the Royal Botanical Gardens at Kew, the Rancho Santa Ana Botanic Garden, Lindenwood University Herbarium and the Grand Canyon Museum Herbarium, which holds the Rose Collom Collection.

== Collaboration with other notable botanists ==
As well as collecting specimens, Collom made careful observations and detailed descriptions of the natural environments, bloom times, growing conditions and uses of native Arizona plants. She was one of the acknowledged collaborators with botanists Kearney and Peebles when they wrote the book Flowering Plants and Ferns of Arizona. In the Collaborators section Kearney and Peebles wrote of Collom that "the writers are indebted for the privilege of using her manuscript notes on the habitat, time of flowering and economic use of Arizona plants". Flowering Plants and Ferns of Arizona became the foundation upon which Kearney and Peebles based their later book Arizona Flora. Collom also contributed to this publication and its subsequent amendment. Arizona Flora remained the classic reference book for information on Arizona flora for over 30 years.

Collom believed that some plants from higher altitudes could adapt themselves to lower altitudes if they were planted and cared for at an intermediate altitude and had time to adjust to the changed conditions. She was encouraged in this theory of progressive adaptation by Dr J. J. Thornberry, a botanist at the University of Arizona, and Dr F. J. Crider, Director of the Boyce Thompson Arboretum. She put this theory into practice by collecting plants from higher altitudes and then planting them in her garden. She allowed them several seasons to adapt and then replanted them at a lower altitude. In this way she assisted and encouraged the use of native Arizona species in gardens in that state.

== First paid botanist of the Grand Canyon National Park ==
In June 1938 Collom undertook a field trip in the Grand Canyon National Park. In October of that year she traded letters with E. McKee, the cofounder of the Grand Canyon National History Association (the predecessor to the Grand Canyon Association). He offered her a grant to enable her to collect specimens in the Grand Canyon area. In accepting this grant and undertaking the work she became the first paid botanist of the Grand Canyon National Park. She conducted her botanical work at the Grand Canyon, visiting to collect specimens or work at the Grand Canyon Museum Herbarium, every year from that time until 1954, excepting 1948 when her husband was ill. The herbarium at the Grand Canyon National Park museum has over 800 of her specimens.

== Garden clubs and botanical societies ==
Collom was also active with the Arizona Federation of Garden Clubs. She was their Horticultural Chairman and helped to encourage the use of native Arizona plants for landscaping in home gardens and beside highways. Collom was also a member of the Arizona Cactus and Native Flora Society which, in 1937, founded the Desert Botanical Garden in Phoenix. She was a charter member of the Desert Botanical Garden and supplied numerous native Arizona plants to it. Many of her personal papers along with her herbarium collection were donated to the Garden in 1951.

== Posthumous awards ==
After her death in 1956 Collom was inducted into the Arizona Women's Hall of Fame. In 1997 the species Mentzelia collomiae was named in her honor.
