= Boyce Thompson Arboretum =

Botanical garden in Pinal County, Arizona

- Location within Arizona Location within the United States
- Location: Pinal, Arizona, United States
- Coordinates: 33°16′45″N 111°9′30″W
- Area: 392 acres (159 ha)
- Elevation: 2,431 ft (741 m)
- Established: 1924
- Named for: William Boyce Thompson
- Governing body: Boyce Thompson Southwestern Arboretum Inc.
- Website: btarboretum.org

Boyce Thompson Arboretum is the oldest and largest botanical garden in the state of Arizona. It is one of the oldest botanical institutions west of the Mississippi River. Founded in 1924 as a desert plant research facility and “living museum”, the arboretum is located in the Sonoran Desert on 392 acres (159 ha) along Queen Creek and beneath the towering volcanic remnant, Picketpost Mountain. Boyce Thompson Arboretum is on U.S. Highway 60, an hour's drive east from Phoenix and 3 miles (4.8 km) west of Superior, Arizona.

The arboretum has a visitor center, gift shop, research offices, greenhouses, a demonstration garden, picnic area, and a looping 1.5-mile (2.4 km) primary trail that leads visitors through various exhibits and natural areas. The exhibits include a cactus garden, palm and eucalyptus groves, an Australian exhibit, South American exhibit, aloe garden and an herb garden. There are also side trails such as the Chihuahuan Trail, Curandero Trail, and High Trail.

Over 2600 species of arid land plants from around the world grow at the arboretum. Agaves, aloes, boojum trees, cork oaks, jujube trees, legume trees, and, in the eucalyptus grove, one of the largest red gum eucalyptus trees ("Mr. Big") in the United States. Cacti and succulents grow extensively throughout the arboretum.

Because the arboretum is a riparian zone, the park attracts Sonoran Desert wildlife and migrating birds. Visitors have seen bobcats, javelinas, coatimundis, rattlesnakes, gila monsters, hawks, hummingbirds, and vultures, while 270 bird species have been spotted in the park, and the Audubon Society has designated the arboretum as an Important Bird Area.

As of 2014 the arboretum had 5,000 members and attracted over 75,000 people annually.

== History ==
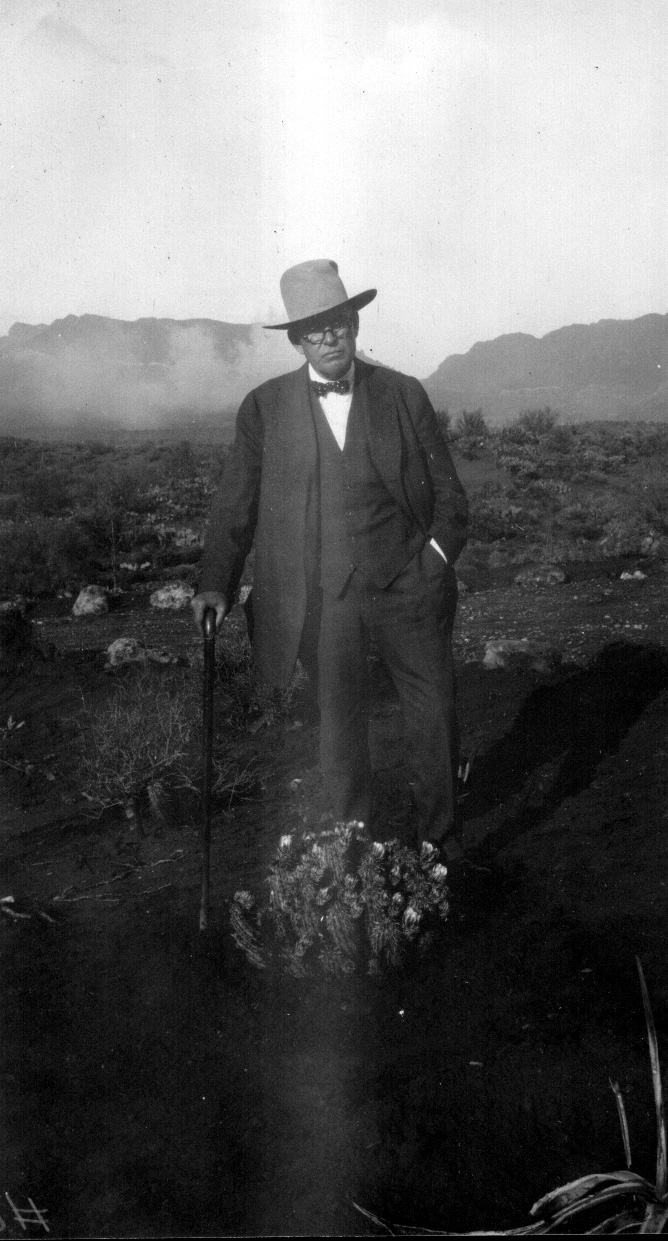
William Boyce Thompson, circa 1928.

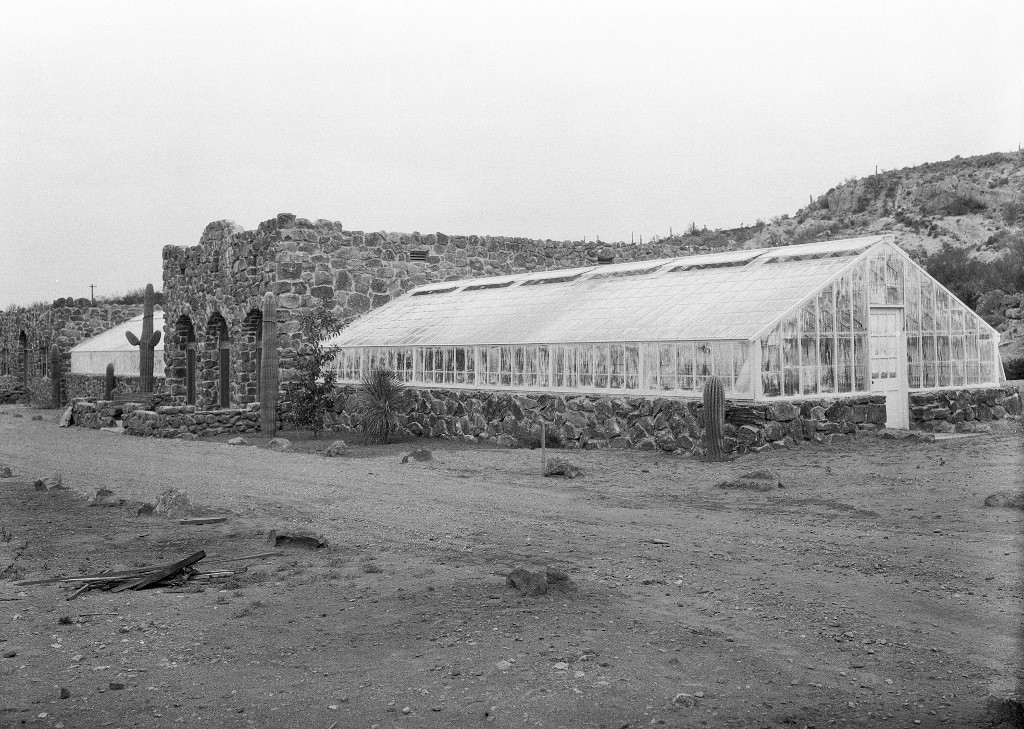
The Smith Building with greenhouses, circa 1926.

The arboretum was founded by William Boyce Thompson (1869–1930), a mining engineer who made a fortune in the copper mining industry. He was the founder and first president of Inspiration Consolidated Copper Company at Globe-Miami, Arizona and Magma Copper Company in Superior, Arizona. In the early 1920s, Thompson, enamored with the landscape around Superior, built a winter home overlooking Queen Creek. Also in the 1920s, as his fortune grew, he created and financed the Boyce Thompson Institute for Plant Research in Yonkers, New York (later at Cornell University), and the Boyce Thompson Arboretum on the property of the Picket Post House, west of Superior.

Boyce Thompson wrote: “I have in mind far more than mere botanical propagation. I hope to benefit the State and the Southwest by the addition of new products. A plant collection will be assembled which will be of interest not only to the nature lover and the plant student, but which will stress the practical side, as well to see if we cannot make these mesas, hillsides, and canyons far more productive and of more benefit to mankind. We will bring together and study the plants of the desert countries, find out their uses, and make them available to the people. It is a big job, but we will build here the most beautiful, and at the same time the most useful garden of its kind in the world.”

The Boyce Thompson Southwestern Arboretum was established on April 1, 1924, with the hiring of its first employees, Dr. Franklin Crider and Frederick Gibson, from the University of Arizona. Their first project was the construction of two homes that still exist on site, the Crider House and the Gibson House. Propagation buildings were put up in 1925 and by 1926, the Smith Building (administration building) and two connecting greenhouses were built. Ayer Lake was created the same year to help irrigate the lower portion of the park. In 1927, the Boyce Thompson Southwest Arboretum was incorporated, becoming the first non-profit research organization in Arizona. The Arboretum opened to the public on April 6, 1929.

=== Arboretum administration board of directors ===
In 1927, the Board of Directors consisted of Colonel Thompson, Charles F. Ayer (a business associate of the Colonel) and Edward Rice, an attorney from Globe. In 1929, the Directors of Boyce Thompson Institute and the Arboretum were added. Since that time, the Colonel's family has served continuously on the Board and is represented by his great-great-grandson Dr. Paul Hohenlohe. His business associates have been represented by the son of another associate, William T. Smith, his son, Richard A. Smith and his son-in-law Ian Thompson. Between the three of them, they have held Chairmanship of the Board from 1963 to 2000 and since 2010. The President of the Boyce Thompson Institute has remained on the Board as well, represented by Dr. David Stern. Since 1976 with the signing of the Tri-Partite Agreement, two members from the University of Arizona and two members from Arizona State Parks also sit on the Board bringing the maximum number of board members to 20.

=== Early years: 1924–1965 ===
With the hiring of Dr. Franklin Crider and Frederick Gibson on April 1, 1924, from the University of Arizona, the Arboretum was on its way. With the passage of Arizona House Bill 121 on March 7, 1925, it became possible for the Arboretum to incorporate as Arizona's first non-profit research institution on October 5, 1927. Opening to the public in 1929, the future was indeed bright for the Arboretum. With the crash of 1929, subsequent depression, a drought, and the passing of the Colonel in 1930, the Arboretum began to struggle. Dr. Crider left as managing director in 1934 and was succeeded by Frederick Gibson. The Picket Post House was sold in 1946 to help cut costs and raise revenues for the Arboretum. Frederick Gibson stayed as Director until his death in 1953. The Colonel's nephew, Joe E. Thompson Jr., became the managing director until the agreement with the University of Arizona in 1965.

=== Desert Biology Station and University of Arizona: 1965–1976 ===
A cooperative agreement was made with the University of Arizona in 1965, and Dr. E. Lendell Cockrum became the 4th Managing Director of the Arboretum. The intent was to reinvigorate the research program at the Arboretum and it was renamed the Desert Biology Station. In addition, Drs. Frank and Carol Crosswhite were added to the staff as Curators of Botany and Zoology. Dr. Cockrum left the Arboretum in 1968 and was replaced by Dr. Vernon Grant. Dr. Grant was succeeded in 1970 by Dr. Robert T. McKittrick who served as the 6th Director until 1984. Dr. McKittrick and Drs. Frank and Carol Crosswhite who retired in 2002 became the bridge between this and the next phase of the Arboretum's development.

=== Tri-Partite Agreement and state park: since 1976 ===
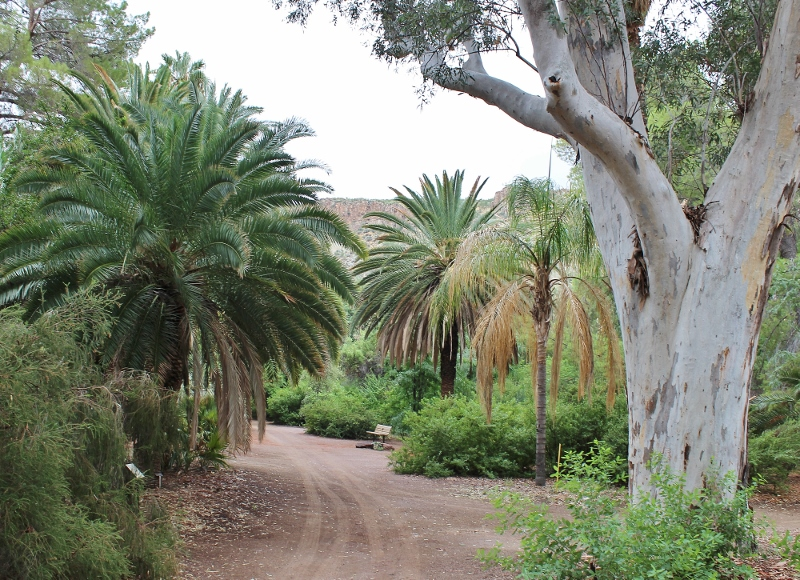
A walking trail winds through groves of trees at the Boyce Thompson Arboretum.

With the signing of the Tri-Partite Agreement on March 30, 1976, the Arboretum became a state park, but remained a scientific research facility and a non-profit institution. The Arboretum was listed on the National Register of Historic Places the same year. The Arboretum began publishing the journal Desert Plants in 1979. Dr. McKittrick, who had brought stability to the Arboretum though two transitions, retired in 1984. His replacement, Dr. William Feldman, was to serve for 21 years, the 3rd longest serving director after Frederick Gibson and Robert McKittrick. Under Dr. Feldman, the Arboretum matured. The Visitor Center, Demonstration Garden, and Legume Garden were completed under his tenure as was the planning for the Children's Garden. Exhibits became more geographically focused and the word “conservation” was added to the mission statement. The Demonstration Garden was developed by Dr. Warren Jones from the University of Arizona and Steve Carter from the Arboretum. The Children's Garden was left for Dr. Mark Bierner to realize during his tenure from 2005 to 2008. In addition, the Picket Post House was purchased by Arizona State Parks in 2008 making the Arboretum whole again.

An example of the Tri-Partite partnership is the University of Arizona/BTA's Desert Legume Program or DELEP. DELEP is one of three U.S. organizations to have its seed bank backed up at the Global Seed Vault in Svalbard, Norway and one of three private organizations backed up at the National Center for Plant Genetic Resources in Fort Collins, Colorado. Another example is the Arizona State Parks’ Volunteer program which has allowed the Arboretum to expand its educational and recreational programming.

== Plant collections ==
The arboretum holds collections of plants from the deserts of the United States, Mexico, Australia, Madagascar, India, China, Japan, Israel, South America, the Middle East, Africa, the Mediterranean, and the Arabian Peninsula. Among these are three nationally accredited plant collections: eucalyptus trees, desert legumes, and southwest oaks.

=== Eucalyptus collection ===
The eucalyptus collection was accredited in 2018. At 93 taxa, it is one of the largest collections in the U.S. and features many trees planted in the 1920s, including "Mr.Big," a Champion Tree.

=== Desert legume collection ===
The arboretum's desert legume collection is the first primarily seed-based collection accredited by Plant Collections Network. The internationally recognized seed bank of 1,413 species are housed at the University of Arizona in Tucson, while 121 species are grown in field plantings and the Taylor Family Desert Legume Garden at the arboretum.

=== Oak collection ===
In 2012, the arboretum gained accreditation of its collection of oak trees, as well as joining the Plant Collection Network's Quercus Multisite Collection. The Boyce Thompson Arboretum's collection includes oak trees sourced from Arizona, New Mexico, and west Texas in the United States, and Sonora, Chihuahua, and Coahuila in Mexico.

=== Other plant collections of note ===
The Australia collection, one of the largest in the United States, contains 39 families, 93 genera, and 321 species of plant. This collection is as old as the arboretum, with the first accessions wild-collected on Australian expeditions and dating back to the early 1920s. Key genera represented include eucalyptus (103 species), acacia (37 species) and melaleuca (15 species).

The ephedra collection is one of the largest collections of New World Ephedra in the world, with 11 of the 12 North American species represented at the arboretum. There are currently 28 taxa, with 69 individual plants.

The aloe collection holds almost half the world's known aloes at 217 species and 817 total plants. Highlight plants in the collection include Aloe helenae, which is an endangered aloe native to Madagascar, as well as Big John, a large unusually colored aloe hybrid in the Wallace collection.

The dudleya collection has recently begun expanding, with 10 species and 24 individual plants currently. Four of these species are listed as vulnerable or locally endangered, as the dudleya are threatened due to habitat loss and poaching.

== Gallery ==
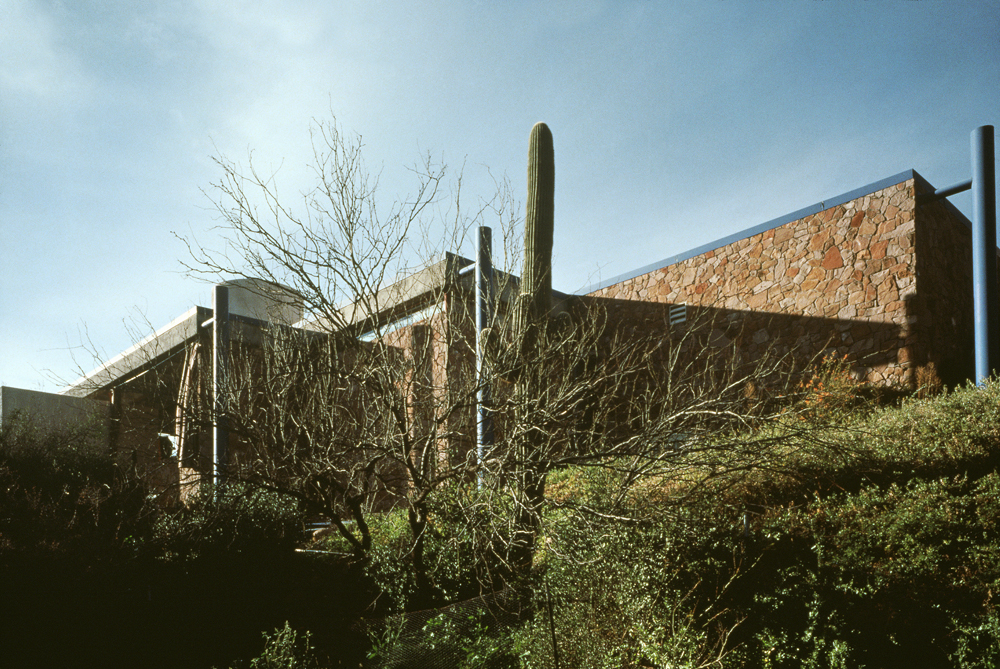
Boyce Thompson Aboretum Visitors Center.

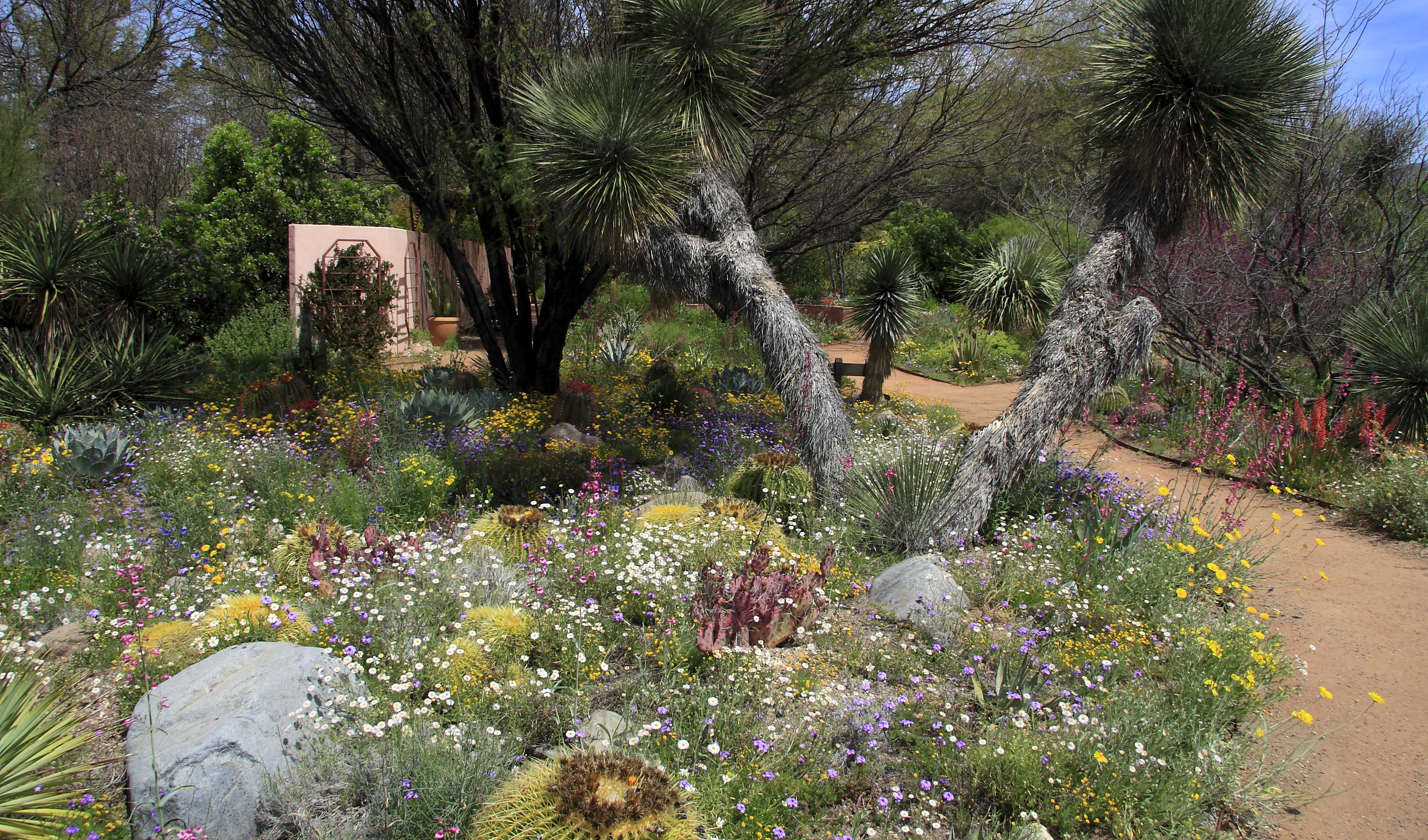
Spring wildflowers

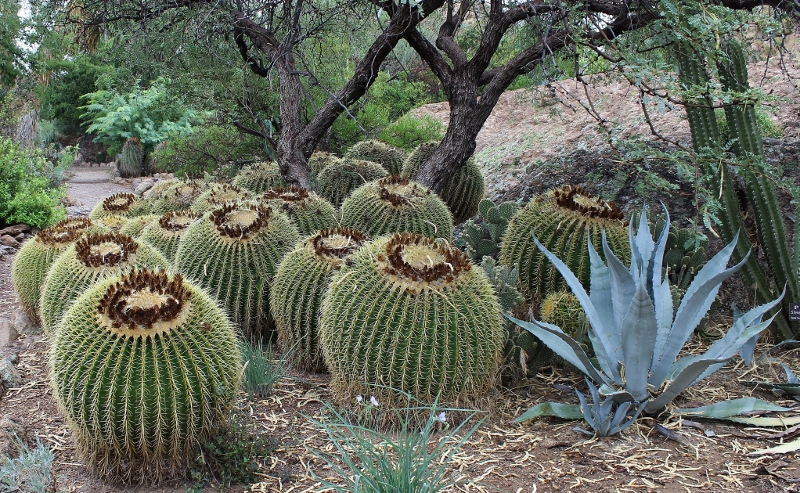
Boyce Thompson Arboretum, Cactus Garden

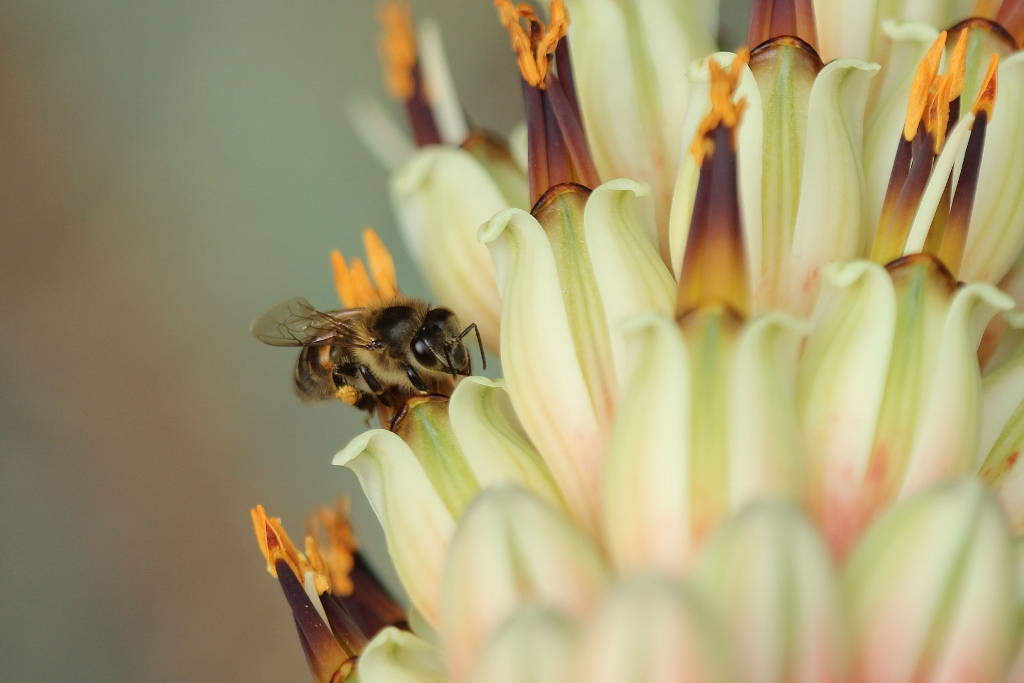
Honey bee on aloe flower.

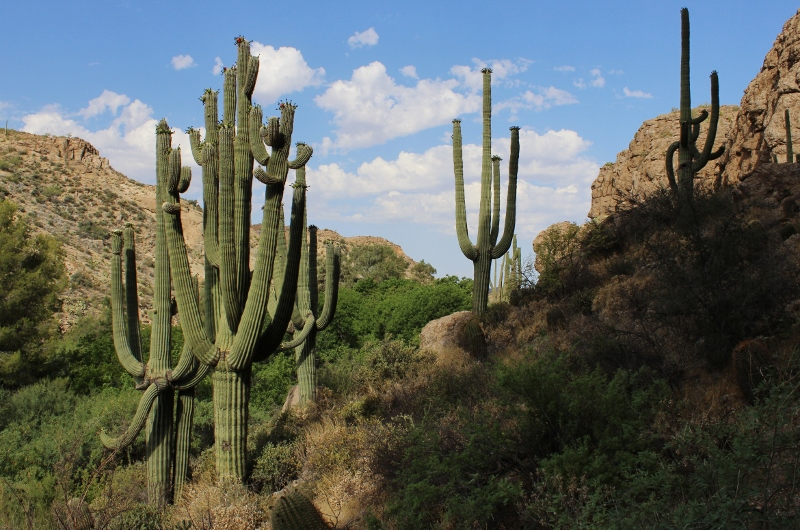
Boyce Thompson Arboretum hiking trail.

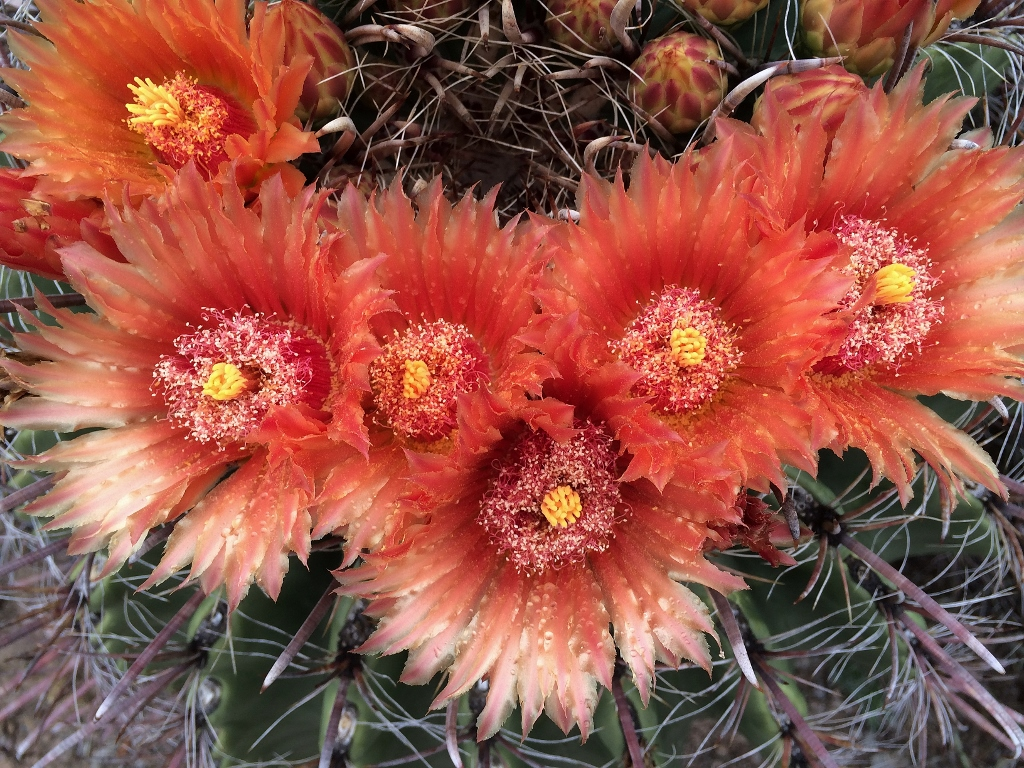
Barrel cactus flowers.

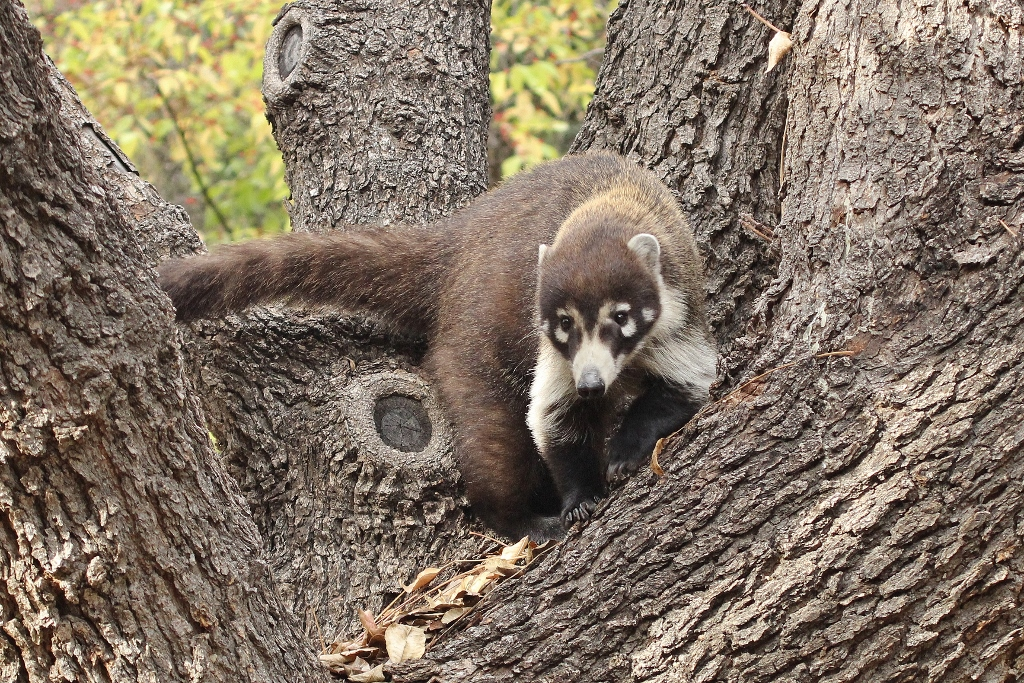
Coatimundi in a tree.

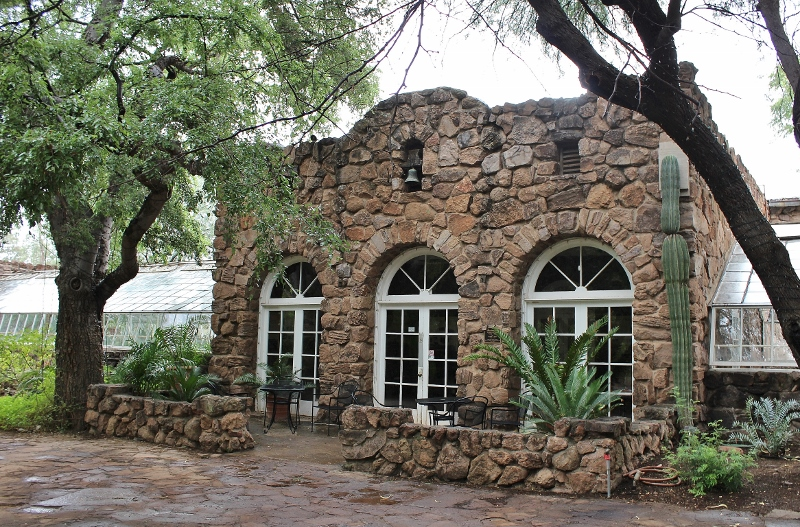
The Smith Building and greenhouses.

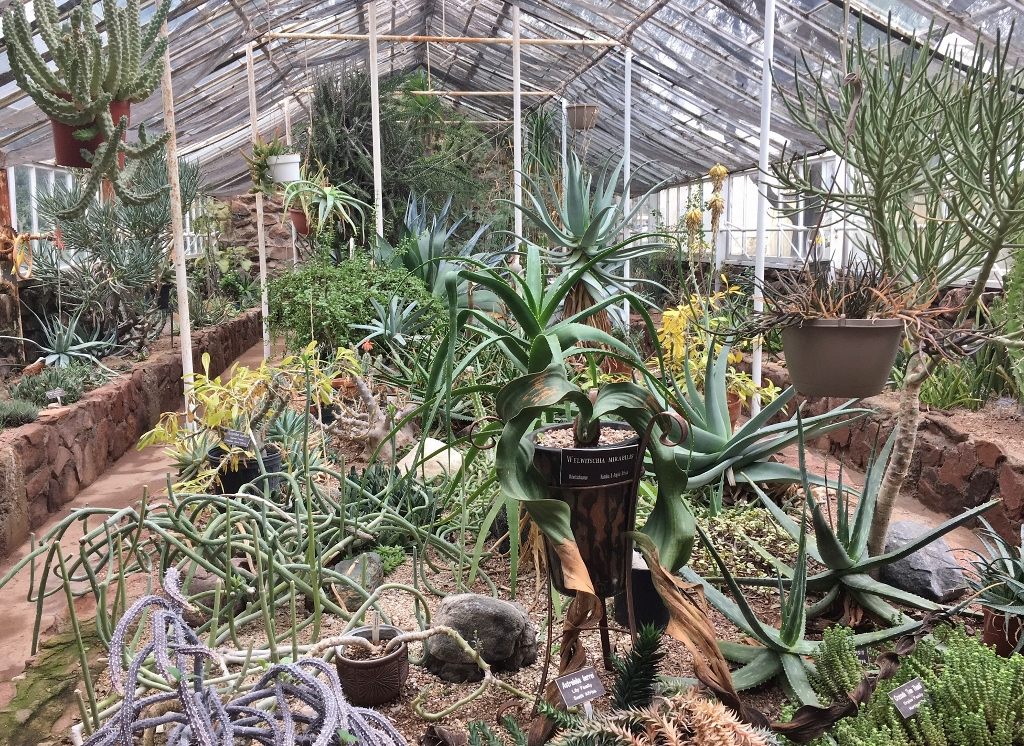
Inside the greenhouse.

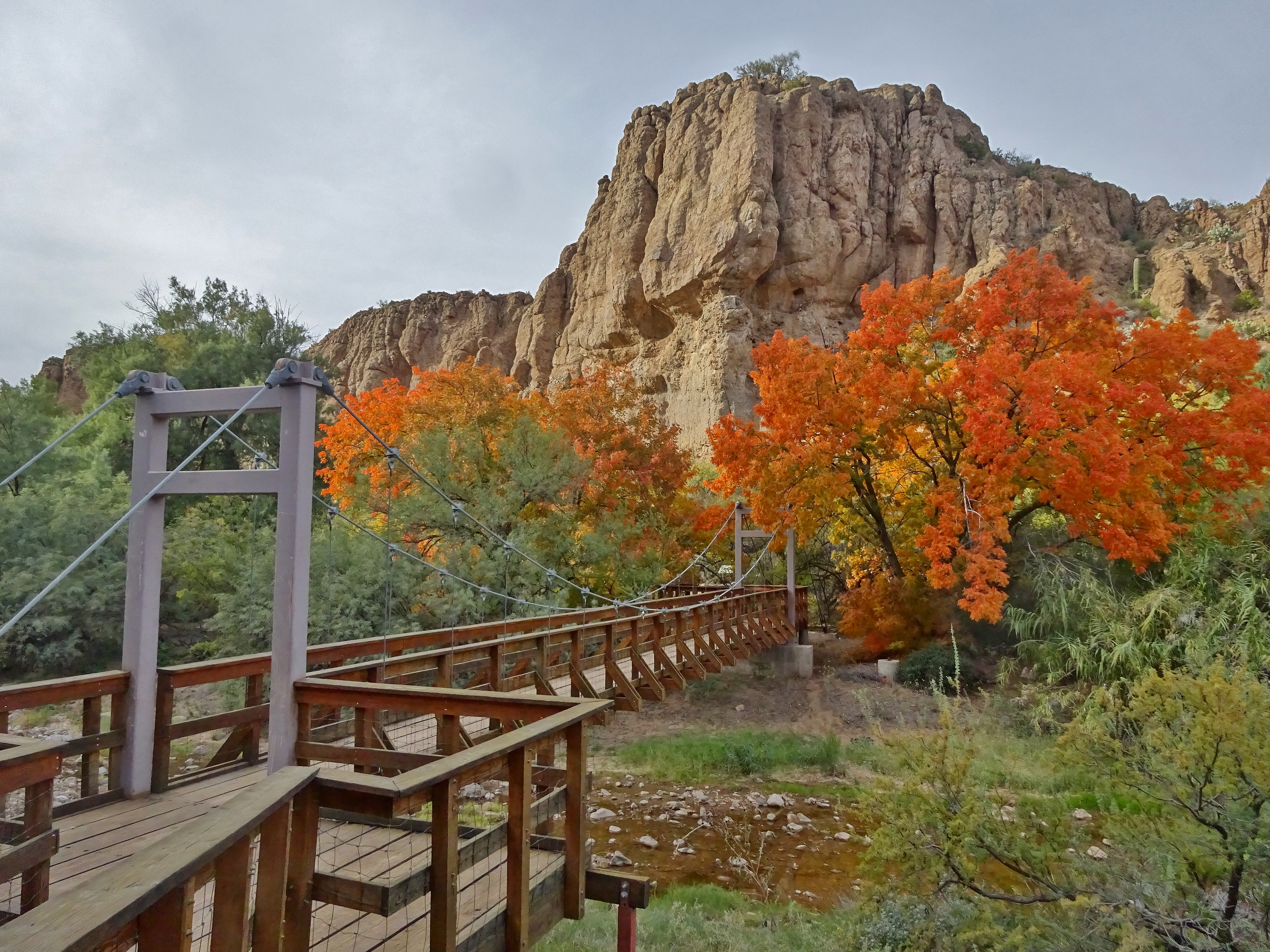
The suspension bridge in autumn.

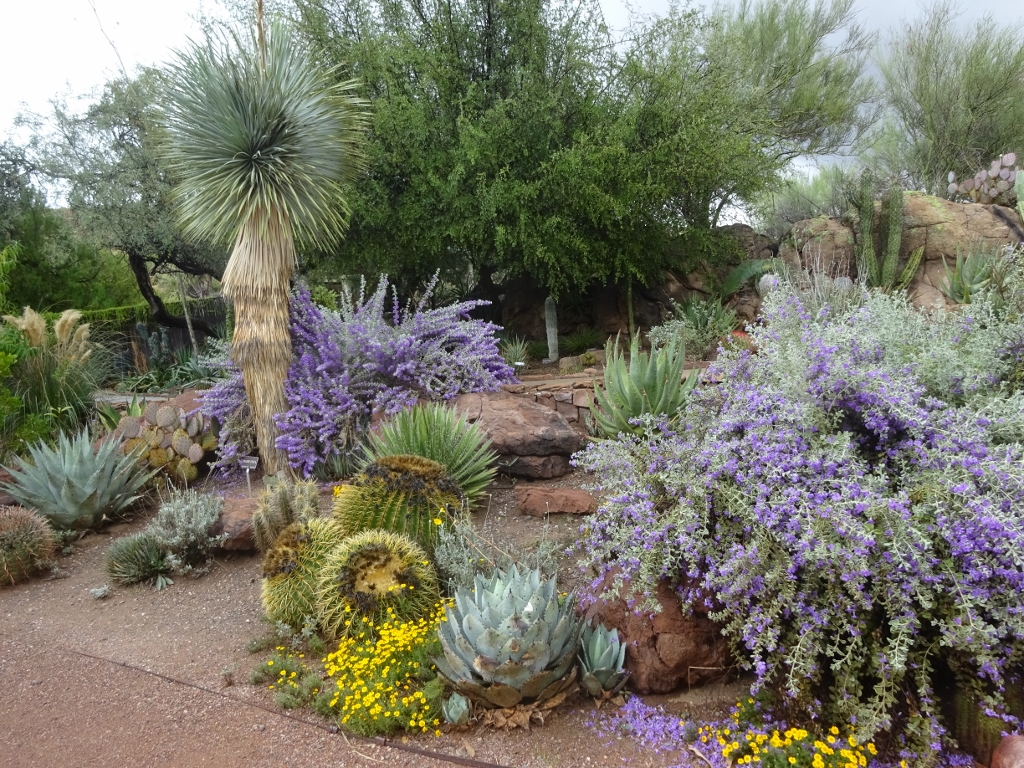
Flowers bloom along the Main Trail.

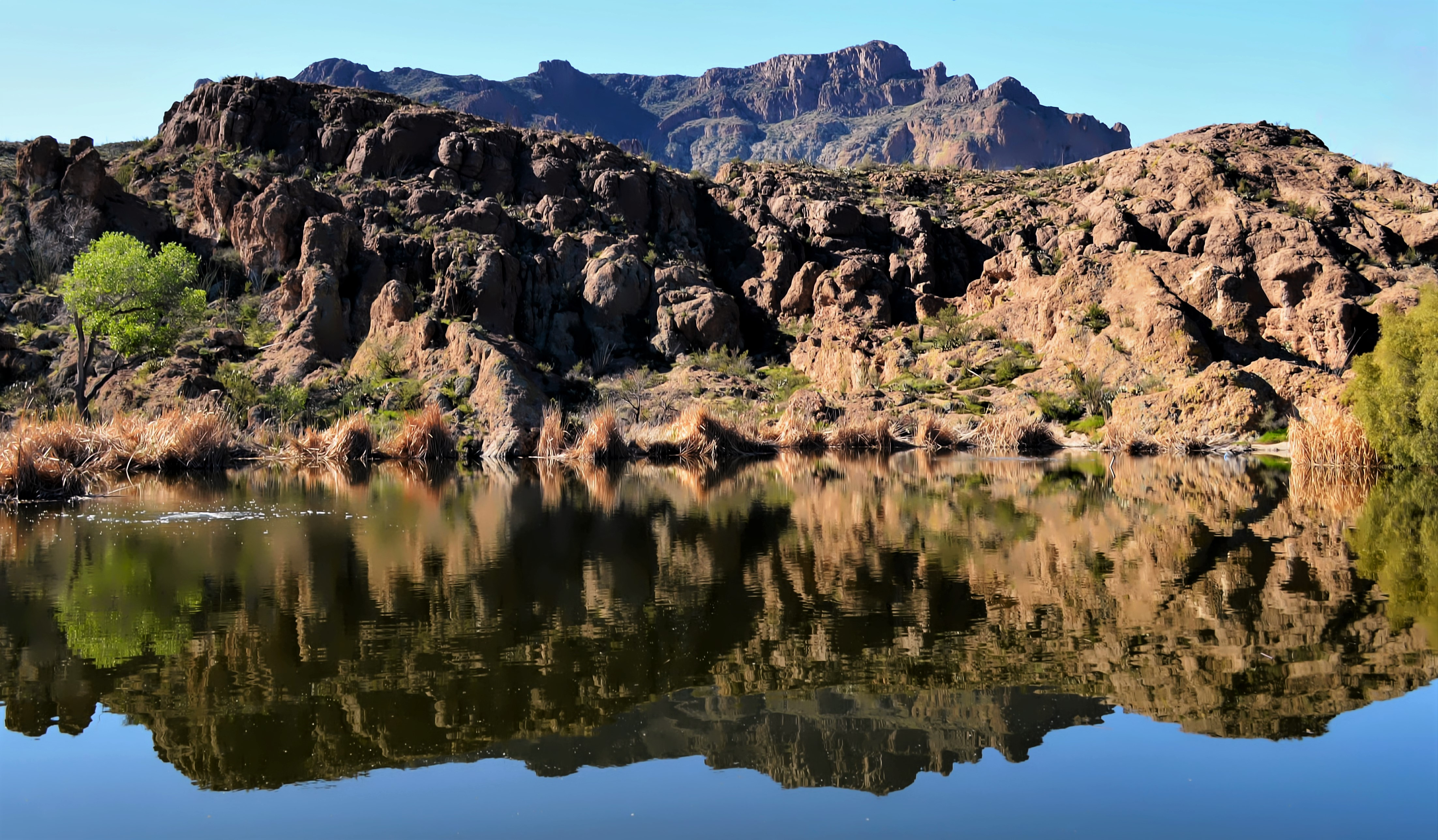
Arboretum pond

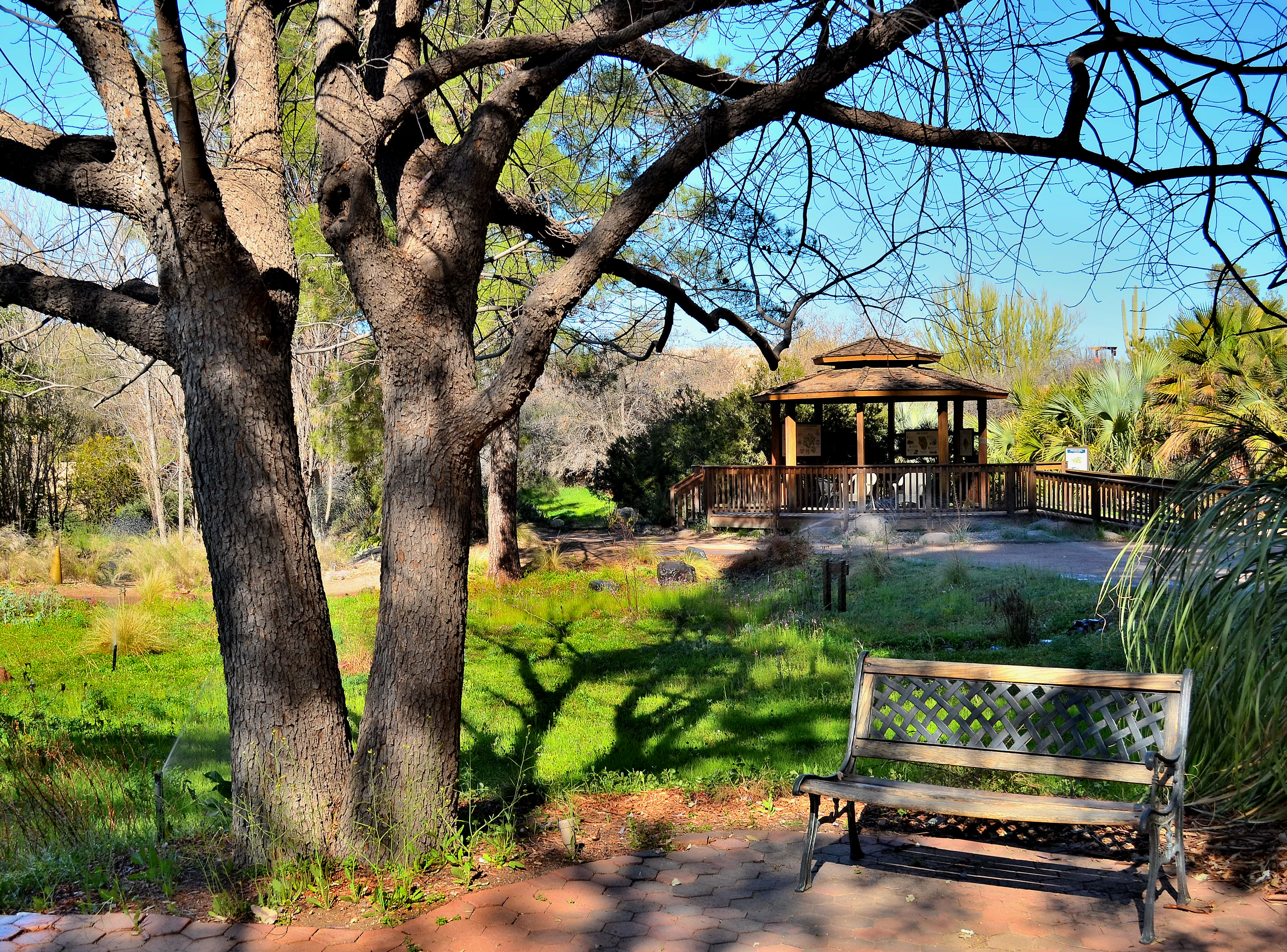
Wildflower & butterfly garden

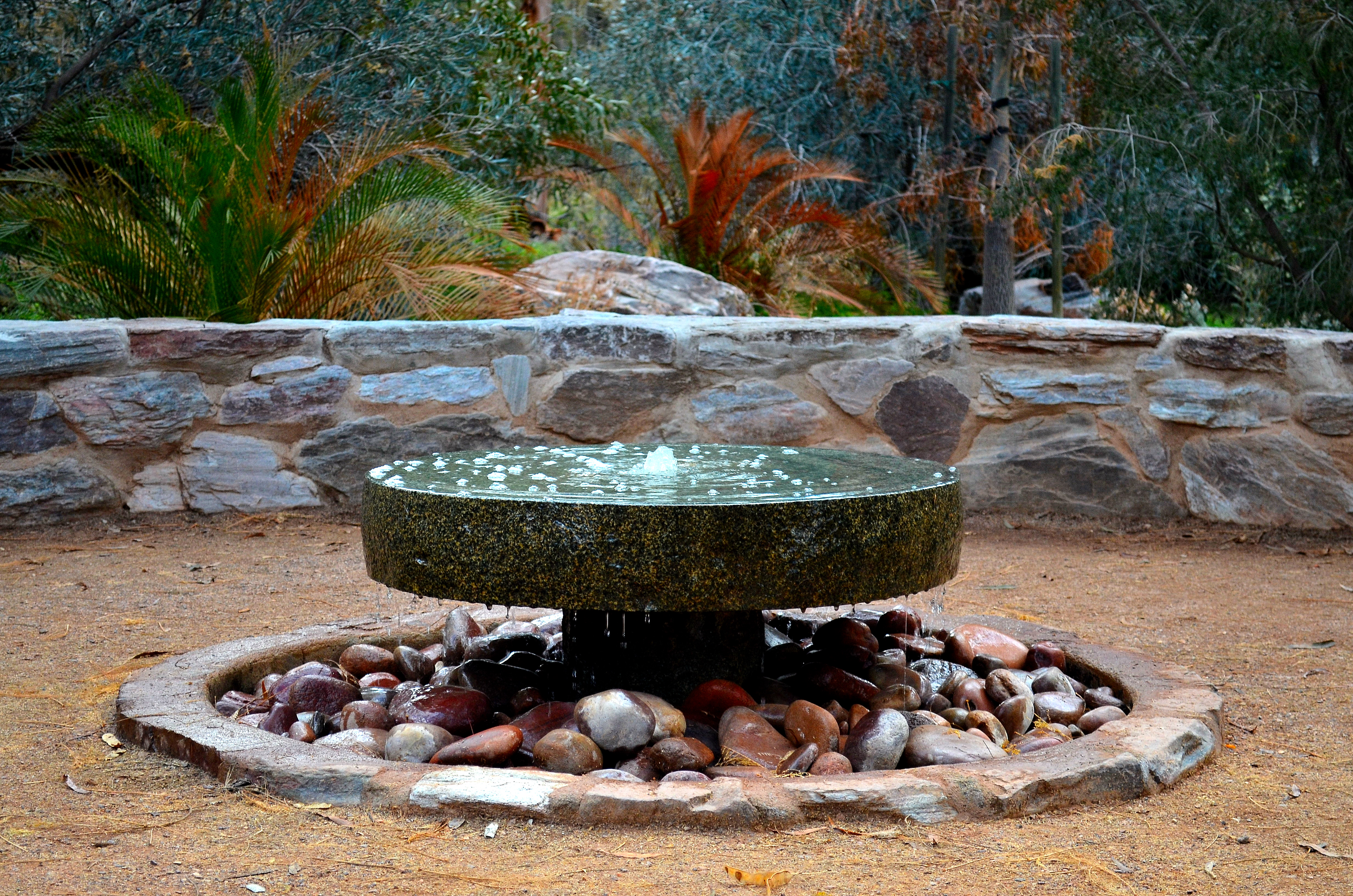
Fountain

== See also ==
- Boyce Thompson Institute for Plant Research
- List of botanical gardens and arboretums in Arizona
