= Rhopalocarpus macrorhamnifolius =

Conservation status
- Least Concern (IUCN 3.1)

Scientific classification
- Kingdom: Plantae
- Clade: Tracheophytes
- Clade: Angiosperms
- Clade: Eudicots
- Clade: Rosids
- Order: Malvales
- Family: Sphaerosepalaceae
- Genus: Rhopalocarpus
- Species: R. macrorhamnifolius

Binomial name
- Rhopalocarpus macrorhamnifolius Capuron

Species of tree

Rhopalocarpus macrorhamnifolius is a tree in the family Sphaerosepalaceae. It is endemic to Madagascar.

== Distribution and habitat ==
Rhopalocarpus macrorhamnifolius is known from populations along the east coast of Madagascar, specifically in the regions of Sava, Alaotra Mangoro, Analanjirofo, Atsinanana and Anosy. Its habitat is humid to evergreen forests from sea-level to 1,500 m (5,000 ft) altitude. Some populations are within protected areas.

== Threats ==
Rhopalocarpus macrorhamnifolius is threatened by shifting patterns of agriculture. Because the species is used as timber and in the production of paper, subsistence harvesting is also a threat.
