= Rhopalocarpus randrianaivoi =

Conservation status
- Endangered (IUCN 3.1)

Scientific classification
- Kingdom: Plantae
- Clade: Tracheophytes
- Clade: Angiosperms
- Clade: Eudicots
- Clade: Rosids
- Order: Malvales
- Family: Sphaerosepalaceae
- Genus: Rhopalocarpus
- Species: R. randrianaivoi

Binomial name
- Rhopalocarpus randrianaivoi G.E.Schatz & Lowry

Species of tree

Rhopalocarpus randrianaivoi is a tree in the family Sphaerosepalaceae. It is endemic to Madagascar. It is named for the authors' colleague and specimen collector Richard Randrianaivo.

== Description ==
Rhopalocarpus randrianaivoi grows as a tree up to 25 m (80 ft) tall. The coriaceous leaves are elliptic in shape and measure up to 9 cm (4 in) long. The species is not known to have any flowers. The fleshy fruits are coloured brown. They may be spherical or two-lobed and measure up to 2.7 cm (1.1 in) across.

== Distribution and habitat ==
Rhopalocarpus randrianaivoi is known only from a few locations in the northeastern region of Sava. Its habitat is humid or subhumid evergreen forests from sea level to 500 m (1,600 ft) altitude.

== Threats ==
Rhopalocarpus randrianaivoi is threatened by shifting patterns of agriculture which are causing deforestation. The species is not present in any protected areas.
