= Rhopalocarpus alternifolius =

Conservation status
- Least Concern (IUCN 3.1)

Scientific classification
- Kingdom: Plantae
- Clade: Tracheophytes
- Clade: Angiosperms
- Clade: Eudicots
- Clade: Rosids
- Order: Malvales
- Family: Sphaerosepalaceae
- Genus: Rhopalocarpus
- Species: R. alternifolius

Binomial name
- Rhopalocarpus alternifolius (Baker) Capuron

Synonyms
- Sphaerosepalum alternifolius Baker

Species of plant

Rhopalocarpus alternifolius is a tree in the family Sphaerosepalaceae. It is endemic to Madagascar.

== Distribution and habitat ==
Rhopalocarpus alternifolius is known only from populations in the northern and northeastern regions of Diana, Sava, Alaotra Mangoro, Analanjirofo and Atsinanana. Its habitat is humid evergreen and dry deciduous forests from sea-level to 1,000 m (3,300 ft) altitude. Some populations are within protected areas.

== Threats ==
Rhopalocarpus alternifolius is threatened by shifting patterns of agriculture. Because the species is used as timber, subsistence harvesting is also a threat.
