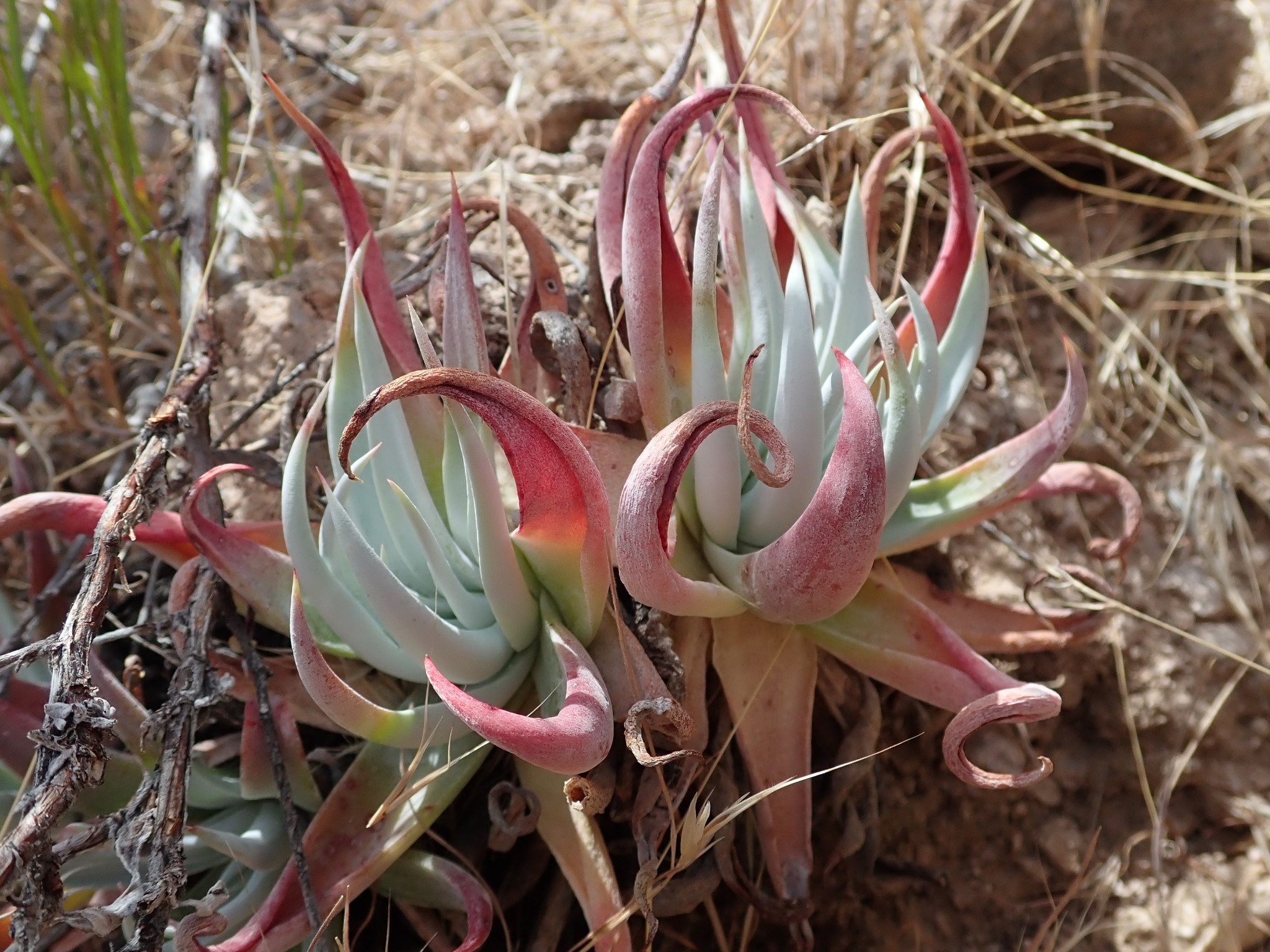

Conservation status
- Apparently Secure (NatureServe)

Scientific classification
- Kingdom: Plantae
- Clade: Embryophytes
- Clade: Tracheophytes
- Clade: Spermatophytes
- Clade: Angiosperms
- Clade: Eudicots
- Order: Saxifragales
- Family: Crassulaceae
- Genus: Dudleya
- Species: D. saxosa
- Subspecies: D. s. subsp. collomiae

Trinomial name
- Dudleya saxosa subsp. collomiae (Rose) Moran

Synonyms
- Dudleya collomiae Rose; Echeveria collomae (Rose) Kearney & Peebles

= Dudleya saxosa subsp. collomiae =

Subspecies of succulent plant

Dudleya saxosa subsp. collomiae, known by the common name Gila County liveforever, is a subspecies of perennial succulent plant within the genus Dudleya native to central Arizona. It is characterized by showy bright-yellow flowers on an upright inflorescence colored pink, red or orange. The leaves are green or covered in a white, powdery wax. This species is found growing in rocky slopes, canyons, and crevices, and often on Sonoran Desert sky islands.

== Morphology ==
This species has a caudex (stem) 1.5–3 cm (0.59–1.18 in) in diameter. Topping the stem is a rosette of leaves, which may be colored green or covered in a white, powdery epicuticular wax. The leaf blades are 5–15 cm (2.0–5.9 in) long by 1–2.5 cm (0.39–0.98 in) wide, and 2–6 cm (0.79–2.36 in) thick.

The inflorescence is composed of red floral shoots, covered in 5 to 12 bracts. The terminal branches are 3–12 cm (1.2–4.7 in) long and bear 4 to 15 flowers on pedicels 5–20 mm (0.20–0.79 in) long. The flowers have their parts in 5. The sepals are 4–7 mm (0.16–0.28 in) long, while the petals are 12–16 mm (0.47–0.63 in) long. The petals are bright yellow but tinged with red.

== Taxonomy ==
Prior to proper taxonomic investigation into the genus, many species within Dudleya were variously classified as Cotyledon, Sedum and Echeveria. The plants currently assigned to this subspecies were first treated taxonomically in 1903 by Nathaniel Lord Britton and Joseph Nelson Rose, who had been working on a revision of Crassulaceae species in North America, which included the creation of the genus Dudleya, named in honor of a Stanford University professor of botany William Russell Dudley. At the time, Britton and Rose placed a specimen of this subspecies as Dudleya parishii, a name now synonymous with Dudleya lanceolata.

In the years preceding his death in 1928, Rose had decided that the common Dudleya of central Arizona represented an undescribed species, and produced a species description, which went unpublished due to his death. In 1934, Conrad V. Morton authenticated Rose's description in the Desert Plant Life journal, creating Dudleya collomiae. The species was named for Mrs. Rose E. Collom, a botanist who collected the type specimen of Dudleya collomiae.

Despite the description by Rose, along with the creation of the genus Dudleya many years prior, botanists such as Thomas Henry Kearney and Robert Hibbs Peebles kept it as a species of Echeveria, Echeveria collomae, Marcus E. Jones as Cotyledon saxosa, and Phillip Munz included this species in the range of Echeveria saxosa. It was not until the cytotaxonomic work by Reid V. Moran and Charles H. Uhl finally cemented Dudleya as distinct from Echeveria and other Crassulaceae genera.

In 1957, Reid Moran assigned Dudleya collomiae as a subspecies of Dudleya saxosa, based on the research conducted in his (unpublished) thesis. He described the new name in an issue of Madroño, citing the "...immediate need for certain names from the thesis." This provided the current combination, Dudleya saxosa subsp. collomiae.

=== Phylogenetics ===
This species has a chromosome number of n = 68. Compared to a similar relative under the same species, Dudleya saxosa subsp. aloides, a diploid, the Arizona subspecies is polyploid, and has larger flowers. They are also relatively isolated from each other, with the whole species having a disjunct distribution.

== Distribution and habitat ==
Dudleya saxosa subsp. collomiae is one of the only species of Dudleya native to Arizona, the other being Dudleya arizonica, the Arizona Chalk Dudleya. It has a preference for rocky slopes, crevices, and canyons in central Arizona on sky islands, occurring from 2,000 to over 6,000 ft. in elevation.

== Gallery ==
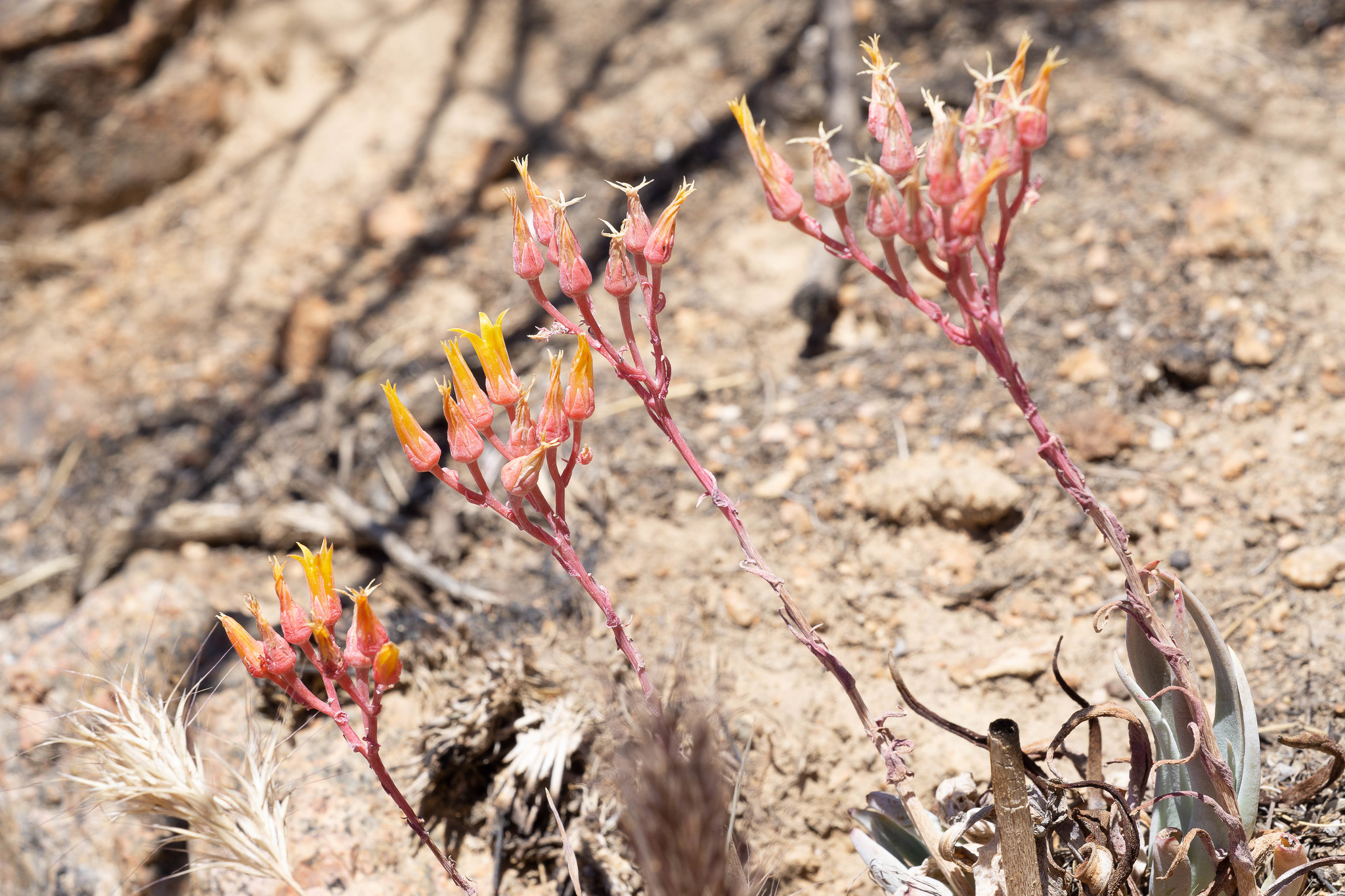
Plants flowering in habitat

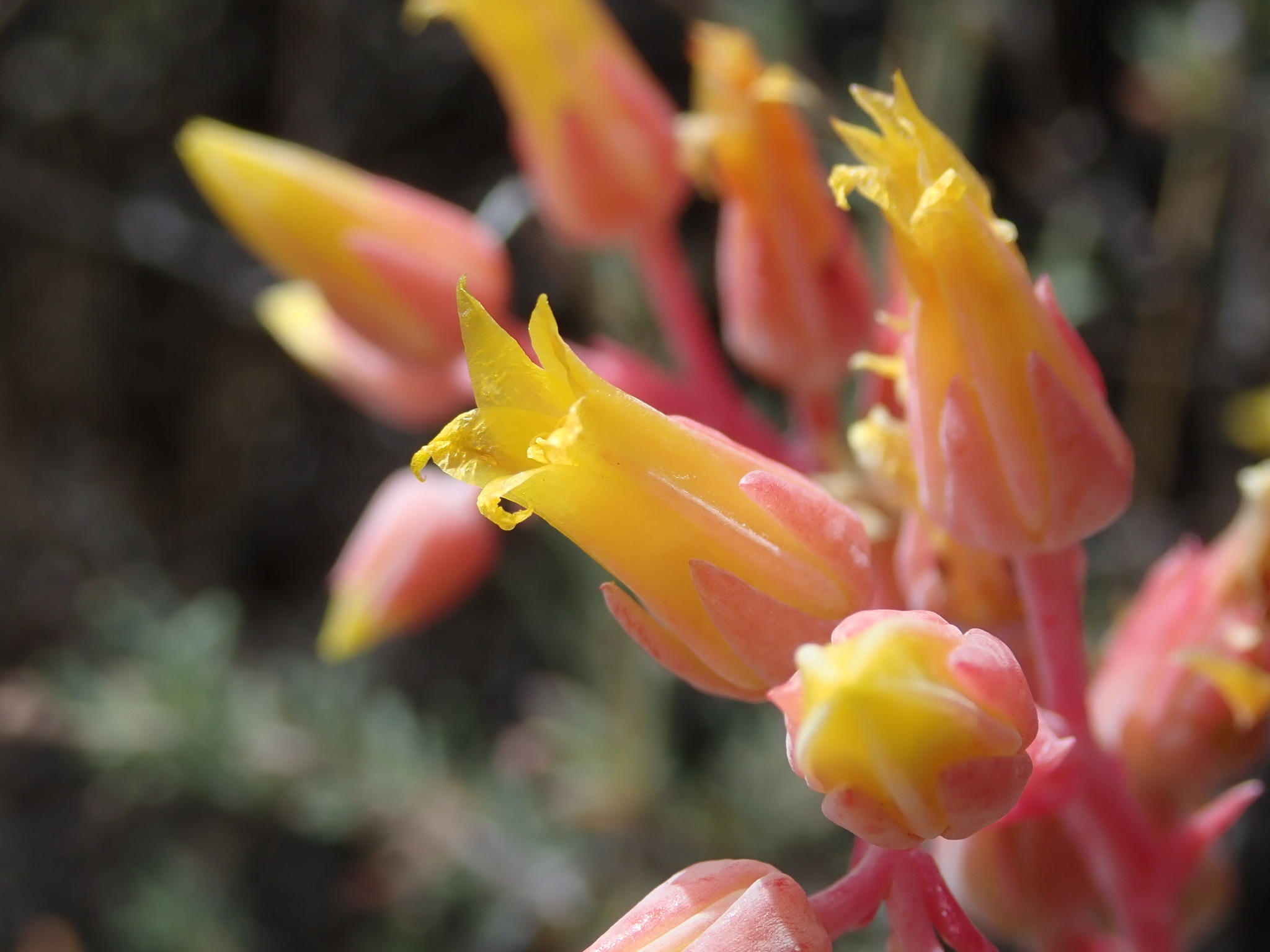
Detail of the flowers

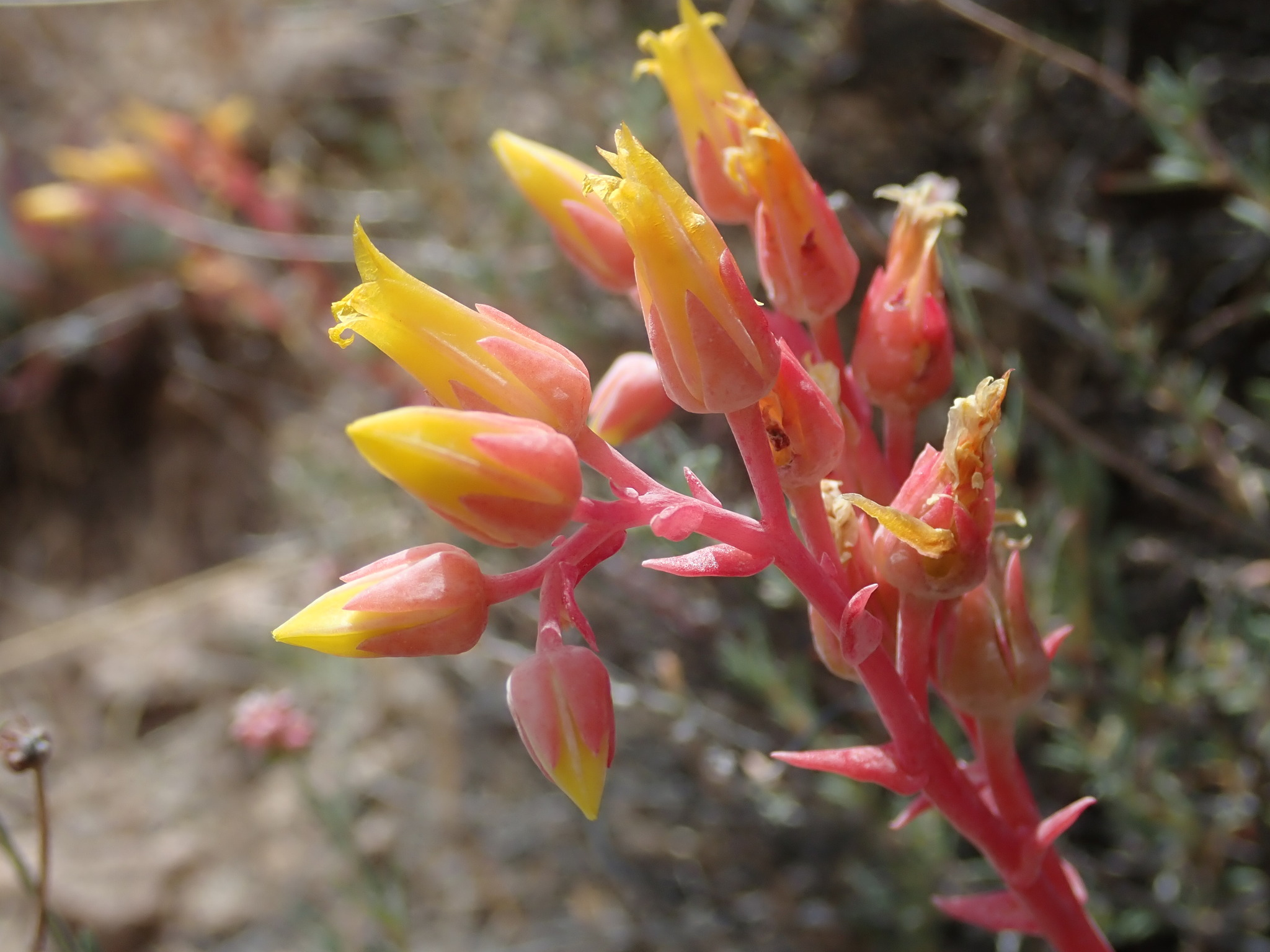
Detail of the inflorescences

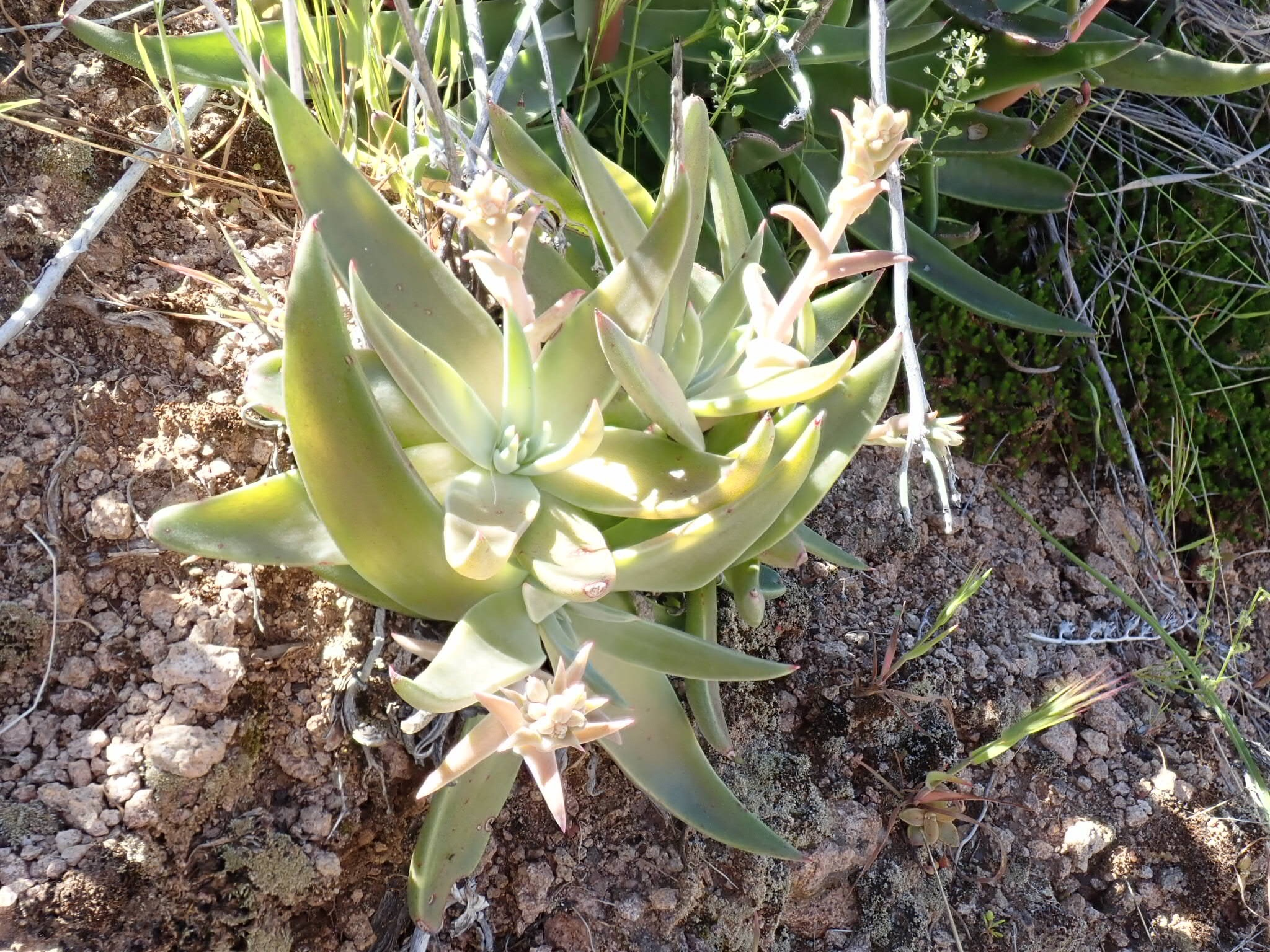
Plants with nascent inflorescences

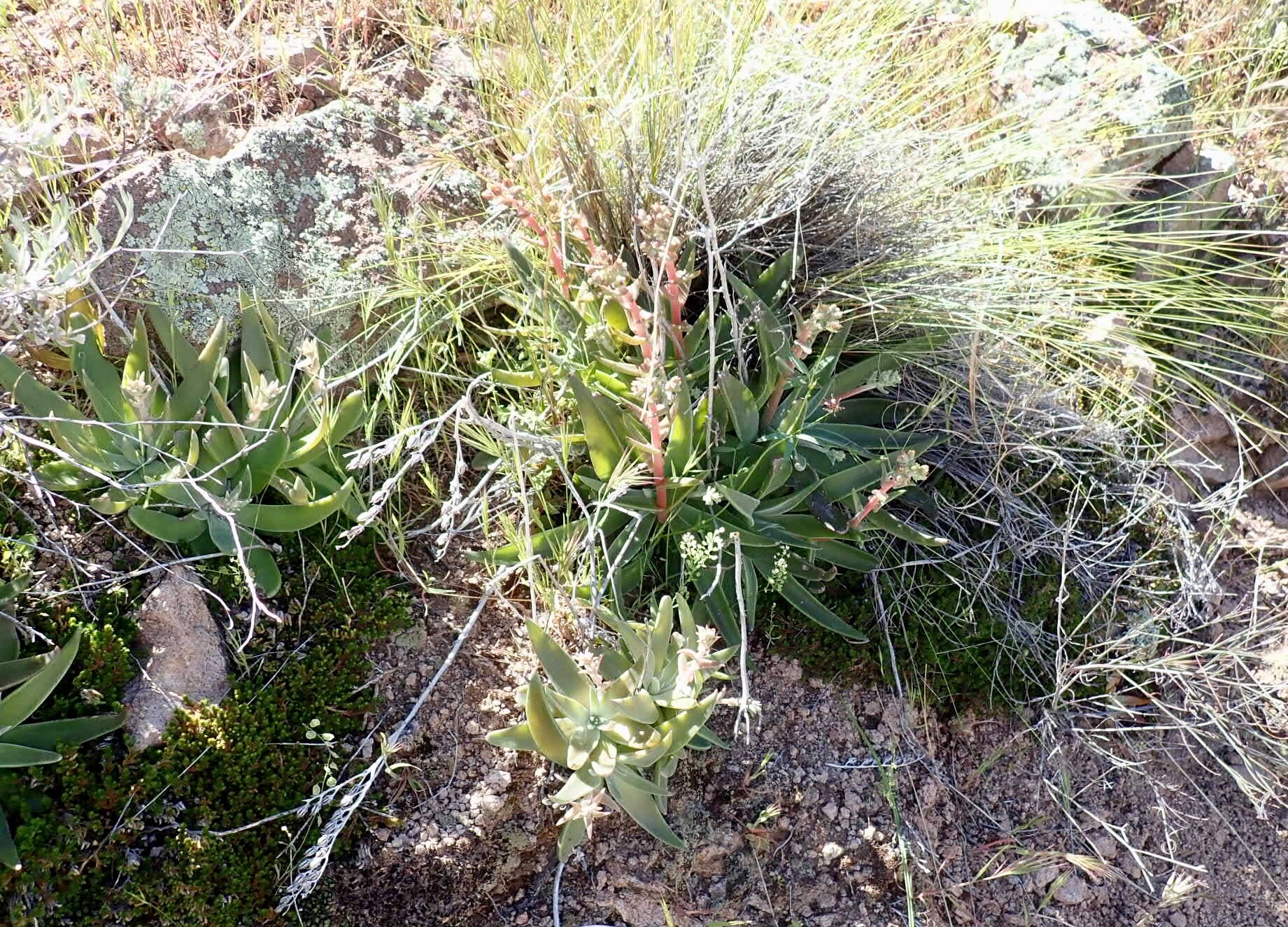
A group of plants
