= Dialyceras discolor =

Conservation status
- Endangered (IUCN 3.1)

Scientific classification
- Kingdom: Plantae
- Clade: Tracheophytes
- Clade: Angiosperms
- Clade: Eudicots
- Clade: Rosids
- Order: Malvales
- Family: Sphaerosepalaceae
- Genus: Dialyceras
- Species: D. discolor

Binomial name
- Dialyceras discolor (Capuron) J.-F.Leroy

Synonyms
- Dialyceras parvifolium f. discolor Capuron

Species of flowering plant

Dialyceras discolor is a tree in the family Sphaerosepalaceae. It is endemic to Madagascar.

== Distribution and habitat ==
Dialyceras discolor is known only from a few locations in the northeastern region of Sava. Its habitat is humid evergreen forests from sea-level to 500 m (1,600 ft) altitude. None of the locations are within protected areas.

== Conservation ==
Dialyceras discolor is threatened because lemurs, and other animals, disperse the tree's seeds. Threats to these animals would in turn affect the tree's reproduction.
