= Rhopalocarpus mollis =

Conservation status
- Endangered (IUCN 3.1)

Scientific classification
- Kingdom: Plantae
- Clade: Tracheophytes
- Clade: Angiosperms
- Clade: Eudicots
- Clade: Rosids
- Order: Malvales
- Family: Sphaerosepalaceae
- Genus: Rhopalocarpus
- Species: R. mollis

Binomial name
- Rhopalocarpus mollis G.E.Schatz & Lowry

Species of tree

Rhopalocarpus mollis is a tree in the family Sphaerosepalaceae. It is endemic to Madagascar. The specific epithet mollis means 'soft', referring to the very soft indumentum on the leaves' underside.

== Description ==
Rhopalocarpus mollis grows as a tree up to 20 metres (70 ft) tall with a trunk diameter of up to 40 cm (16 in). The coriaceous leaves are elliptic in shape and measure up to 13.4 cm (5 in) long. It is not known to have any flowers. The fleshy fruits are coloured green when fresh. They may be spherical measuring up to 3 cm (1.2 in) in diameter or two-lobed and measure up to 4.5 cm (1.8 in) across.

== Distribution and habitat ==
Rhopalocarpus mollis is known only from four locations in the northern regions of Sofia and Analanjirofo. Its habitat is subhumid forests from 500 m (1,600 ft) to 1,000 m (3,300 ft) altitude.

== Threats ==
Rhopalocarpus mollis is threatened by shifting patterns of agriculture. Because the species is used as timber, subsistence harvesting is also a threat.
