= Rhopalocarpus undulatus =

Conservation status
- Vulnerable (IUCN 3.1)

Scientific classification
- Kingdom: Plantae
- Clade: Tracheophytes
- Clade: Angiosperms
- Clade: Eudicots
- Clade: Rosids
- Order: Malvales
- Family: Sphaerosepalaceae
- Genus: Rhopalocarpus
- Species: R. undulatus

Binomial name
- Rhopalocarpus undulatus Capuron

Species of flowering plant

Rhopalocarpus undulatus is a tree in the family Sphaerosepalaceae. It is endemic to Madagascar.

== Distribution and habitat ==
Rhopalocarpus undulatus is known only from eight locations in the northern regions of Diana and Sava. It is present and protected in the Ankarana Special Reserve. Its habitat is dry deciduous forests from 10 m (30 ft) to 400 m (1,300 ft) altitude.

== Conservation ==
Rhopalocarpus undulatus is threatened by shifting patterns of agriculture. Because the species is used as timber, subsistence harvesting is also a threat. Wildfires also threaten the species.
