= Rhopalocarpus coriaceus =

Conservation status
- Least Concern (IUCN 3.1)

Scientific classification
- Kingdom: Plantae
- Clade: Tracheophytes
- Clade: Angiosperms
- Clade: Eudicots
- Clade: Rosids
- Order: Malvales
- Family: Sphaerosepalaceae
- Genus: Rhopalocarpus
- Species: R. coriaceus

Binomial name
- Rhopalocarpus coriaceus (Scott-Elliot) Capuron

Synonyms
- Sphaerosepalum coriaceum Scott-Elliot

Species of tree

Rhopalocarpus coriaceus is a tree in the family Sphaerosepalaceae. It is endemic to Madagascar.

== Distribution and habitat ==
Rhopalocarpus coriaceus is known from populations along the east coast of Madagascar, specifically in the regions of Sava, Alaotra Mangoro, Atsimo-Atsinanana, Analanjirofo and Anosy. Its habitat is coastal forests from sea-level to 500 m (1,600 ft) altitude. Some populations are within protected areas.

== Threats ==
Rhopalocarpus coriaceus is threatened by shifting patterns of agriculture. Because the species is used as timber, subsistence harvesting is also a threat.
