= Rhopalocarpus lucidus =

Conservation status
- Least Concern (IUCN 3.1)

Scientific classification
- Kingdom: Plantae
- Clade: Tracheophytes
- Clade: Angiosperms
- Clade: Eudicots
- Clade: Rosids
- Order: Malvales
- Family: Sphaerosepalaceae
- Genus: Rhopalocarpus
- Species: R. lucidus

Binomial name
- Rhopalocarpus lucidus Bojer

Species of plant in the family Sphaerosepalaceae

Rhopalocarpus lucidus is a tree in the family Sphaerosepalaceae. It is endemic to Madagascar.

== Distribution and habitat ==
Rhopalocarpus lucidus is a widespread species in Madagascar. Its habitat is forests and thickets from sea-level to 1,000 m (3,300 ft) altitude. Some populations are within protected areas.

== Threats ==
Because Rhopalocarpus lucidus is used as firewood and for making tools and rope, subsistence harvesting is a threat.
