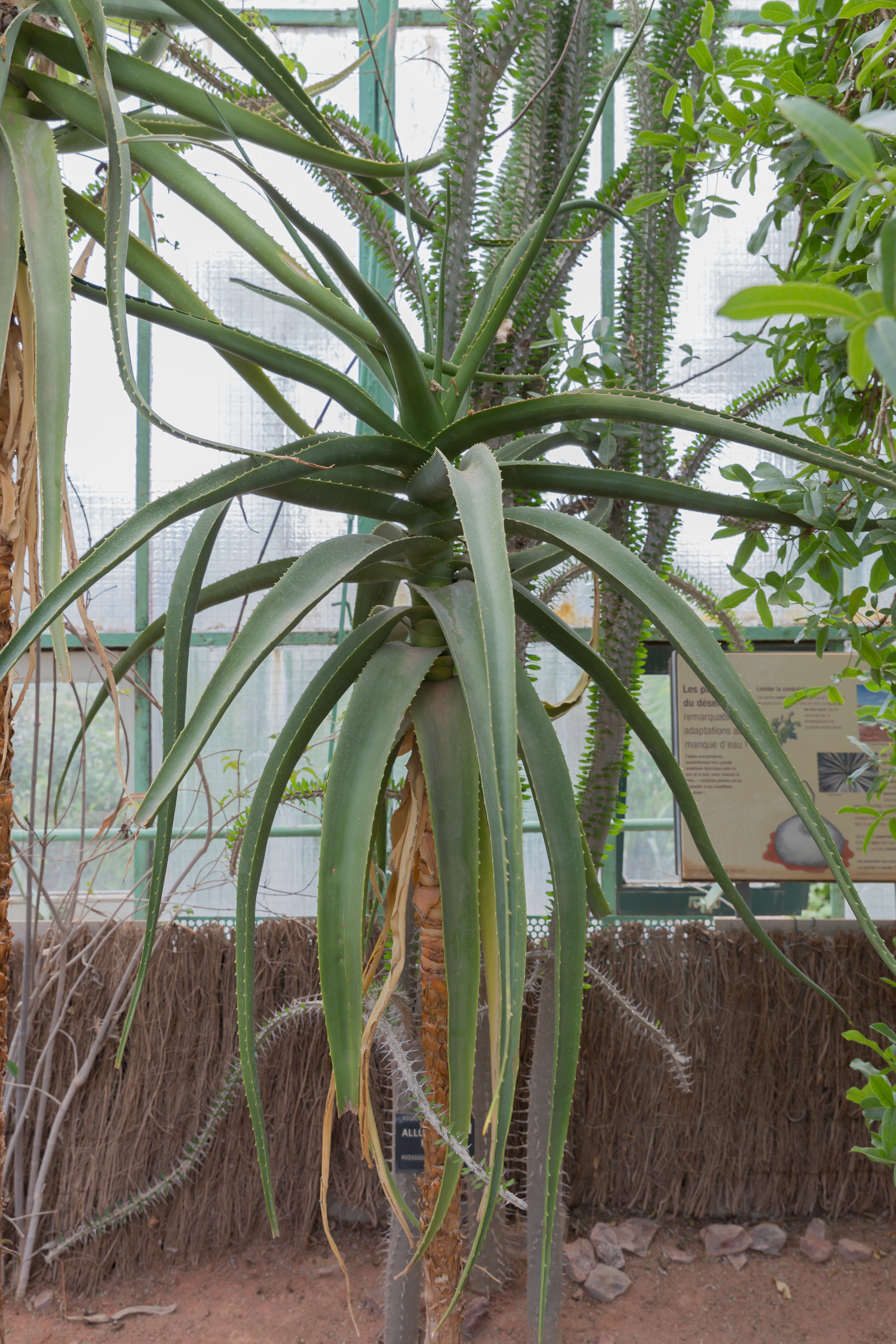
- In cultivation in the Jardin botanique de Lyon
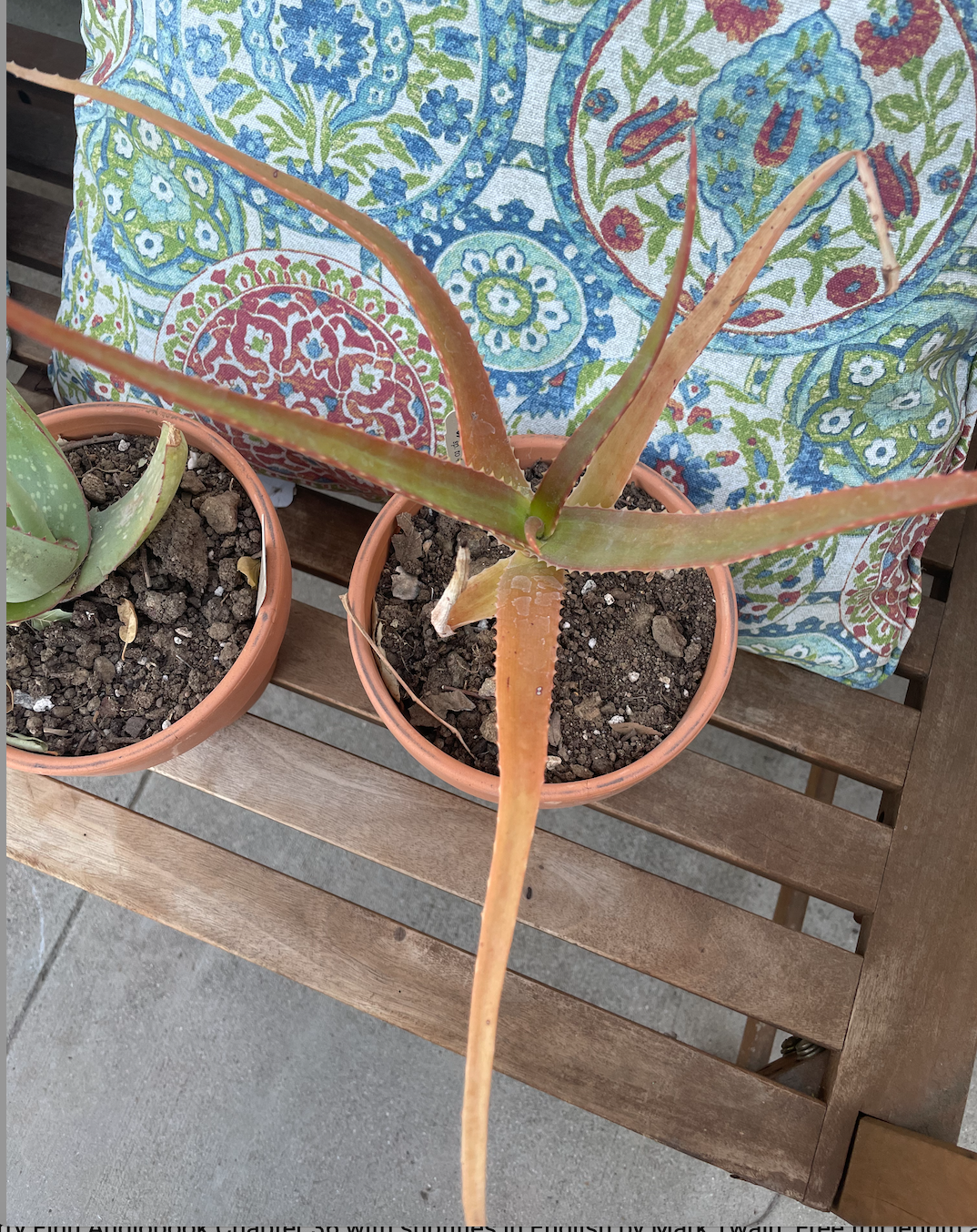
- A young plant (private collection)

Conservation status
- Endangered (IUCN 3.1)
- CITES Appendix I

Scientific classification
- Kingdom: Plantae
- Clade: Tracheophytes
- Clade: Angiosperms
- Clade: Monocots
- Order: Asparagales
- Family: Asphodelaceae
- Subfamily: Asphodeloideae
- Genus: Aloe
- Species: A. helenae

Binomial name
- Aloe helenae Danguy

= Aloe helenae =

Species of succulent

Aloe helenae is a species of plant in the genus Aloe. It is endemic to Madagascar, and is an endangered species.

== Description ==
Aloe helenae in the wild grows to about 4 m (13 ft) and does not usually offset, although it is known to do so in cultivation. The trunk has a rosette of leaves at the top. These are channeled and recurved, usually green but may have red tones in bright light or when stressed by drought. The inflorescence consists of racemes, each under 30 cm (1 ft) long. The flower buds are red, opening with pale yellow petals.

== Taxonomy ==
Aloe helenae was first described by Paul Auguste Danguy in 1929. The specific epithet honors Helen Decary, the wife of Raymond Decary, who was the first to describe a number of Madagascan succulents.

== Distribution ==
Aloe helenae is native to Madagascar. It is known only from few small populations in the former Toliara Province in the southwest of Madagascar. It grows in spiny forests in sandy soils. It is listed as endangered on the International Union for the Conservation of Nature's Red List.
