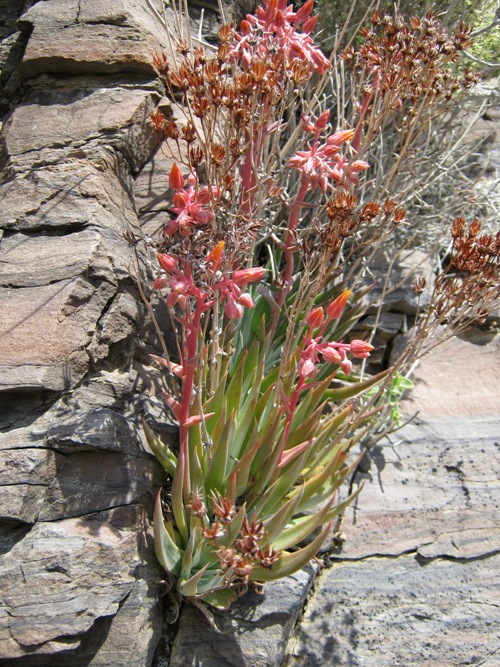

Scientific classification
- Kingdom: Plantae
- Clade: Embryophytes
- Clade: Tracheophytes
- Clade: Spermatophytes
- Clade: Angiosperms
- Clade: Eudicots
- Order: Saxifragales
- Family: Crassulaceae
- Genus: Dudleya
- Species: D. saxosa
- Subspecies: D. s. subsp. saxosa

Trinomial name
- Dudleya saxosa subsp. saxosa (M.E. Jones) Britton & Rose

Synonyms
- Cotyledon saxosum M.E.Jones

= Dudleya saxosa subsp. saxosa =

Panamint dudleya

Plant species

Dudleya saxosa subsp. saxosa is a species of succulent perennial plant endemic only to the western Panamint Range of California. It is known commonly as the Panamint liveforever or Panamint dudleya. It is found on north-facing, granitic or limestone slopes and grows up to 20 cm wide. It is characterized by bright yellow, red tinged flowers, which bloom from May to June.

== Description ==
This species grows from basal rosettes which emerge from a caudex. The caudex is 1 to 1.5 cm in diameter. There are 1 to 4 rosettes per plant, which can be 6 to 20 cm wide. The leaves are 3 to 9 cm long, 3 to 15 mm wide, and 1.5 to 3 mm thick, with the base 5 to 15 mm wide.

The inflorescence emerges from a peduncle 5 to 20 cm tall, and 2 to 4 mm wide. The lower internodes are generally greater than 5 mm apart. There are 3 first degree branches, with the terminal branches (cincinni) not wavy, the terminal branches 1 to 4 cm long, 2 to 9 flowered. The pedicels are 5 to 10 mm long. The flower has petals that are 9 to 12 mm long, colored bright yellow, and generally tinged with red.

== Taxonomy ==
This species was described as Cotyledon saxosum by Marcus E. Jones, based on a plant he found growing in Panamint Canyon in 1897. In their revision of North American Crassulaceae, Nathaniel Lord Britton and Joseph Nelson Rose placed this species as Dudleya saxosa. It was reduced to an autonym, Dudleya saxosa subsp. saxosa with Reid Moran's subsequent changes to the taxonomy of Dudleya.

The plant is a well-isolated polyploid compared to the other subspecies of Dudleya saxosa, differing in its smaller size. It has a chromosome number of 2n = 136 and 2n = 170.

== Distribution and habitat ==
This species is found growing on north-facing, granitic or limestone cliffs and rocky slopes. It is found only in the western Panamint Mountains of California.
