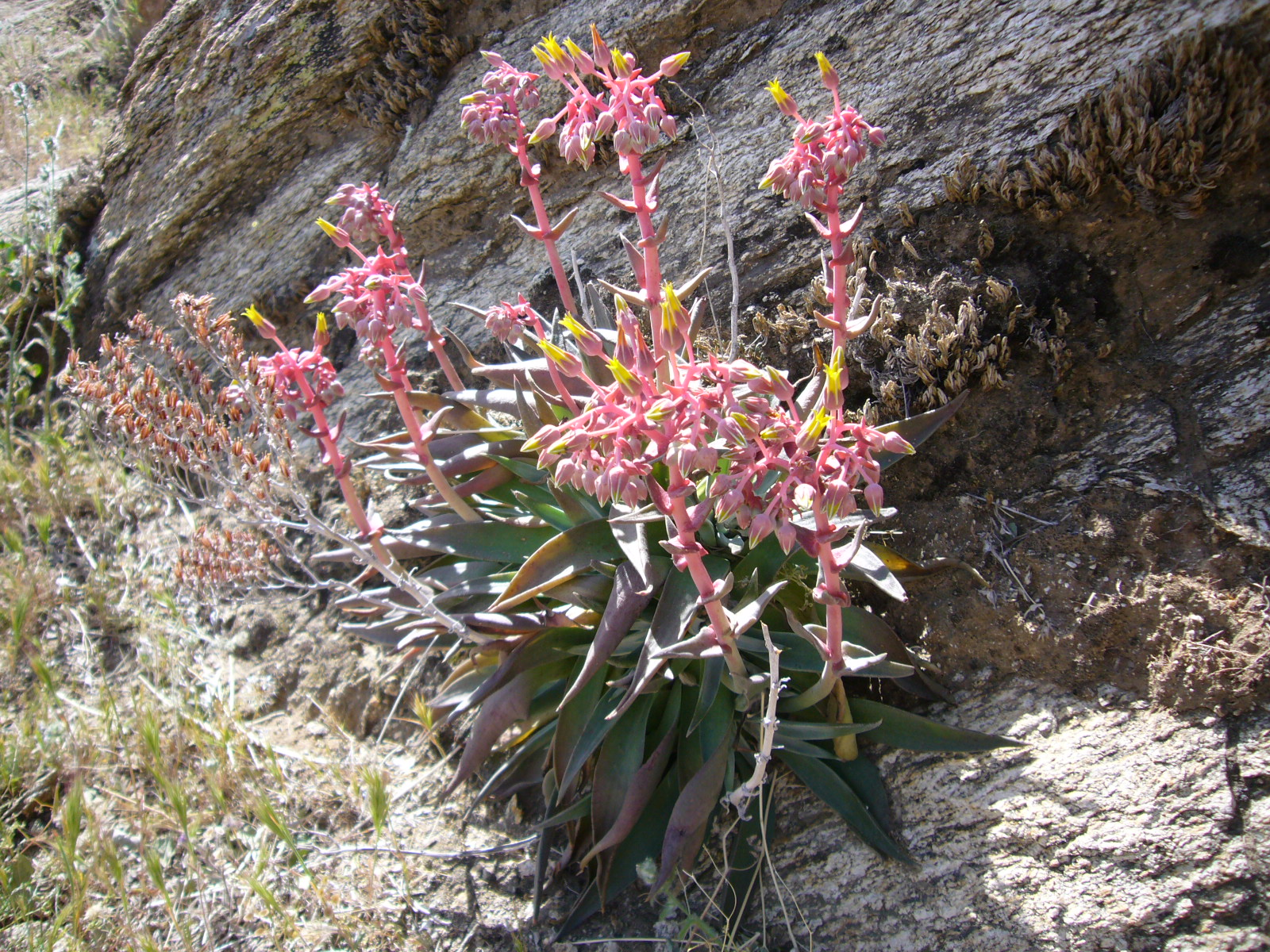
- Dudleya saxosa subsp. aloides

Scientific classification
- Kingdom: Plantae
- Clade: Tracheophytes
- Clade: Angiosperms
- Clade: Eudicots
- Order: Saxifragales
- Family: Crassulaceae
- Genus: Dudleya
- Species: D. saxosa

Binomial name
- Dudleya saxosa (M. E. Jones) Britt. & Rose

= Dudleya saxosa =

Species of succulent

Dudleya saxosa is a perennial succulent plant species in the family Crassulaceae, within the genus Dudleya, which are commonly known as liveforevers. This species is a complex of 3 subspecies of plants, isolated and disjunct in distribution from one another, each with varying levels of ploidy and morphology. One plant is native throughout the deserts and mountains of Southern California, another is found in the Panamint Mountains, and one is found throughout central Arizona.

== Description ==
Dudleya saxosa is plant that grows from a rosette of fleshy leaves, which may be flat and blade-shaped to somewhat cylindrical. It bolts one or more erect stems which are usually dull pink to red in color, sometimes with pale green coloration. Atop the stems are compact inflorescences of flowers with bright yellow petals.

== Subdivisions ==
- Dudleya saxosa subsp. saxosa (Panamint live-forever)A geographically isolated and polyploid population from the other species, this plant is found in the Panamint Range near Death Valley.
- Dudleya saxosa subsp. aloides (desert live-forever) Occurs widely throughout the Peninsular Ranges and the desert mountains of Southern California. Composed of several somewhat different diploid populations, including Dudleya alainae.
- Dudleya saxosa subsp. collomiae (Gila County live-forever) A well isolated polyploid subspecies found throughout central Arizona. It is most similar to the diploid subsp. aloides.
