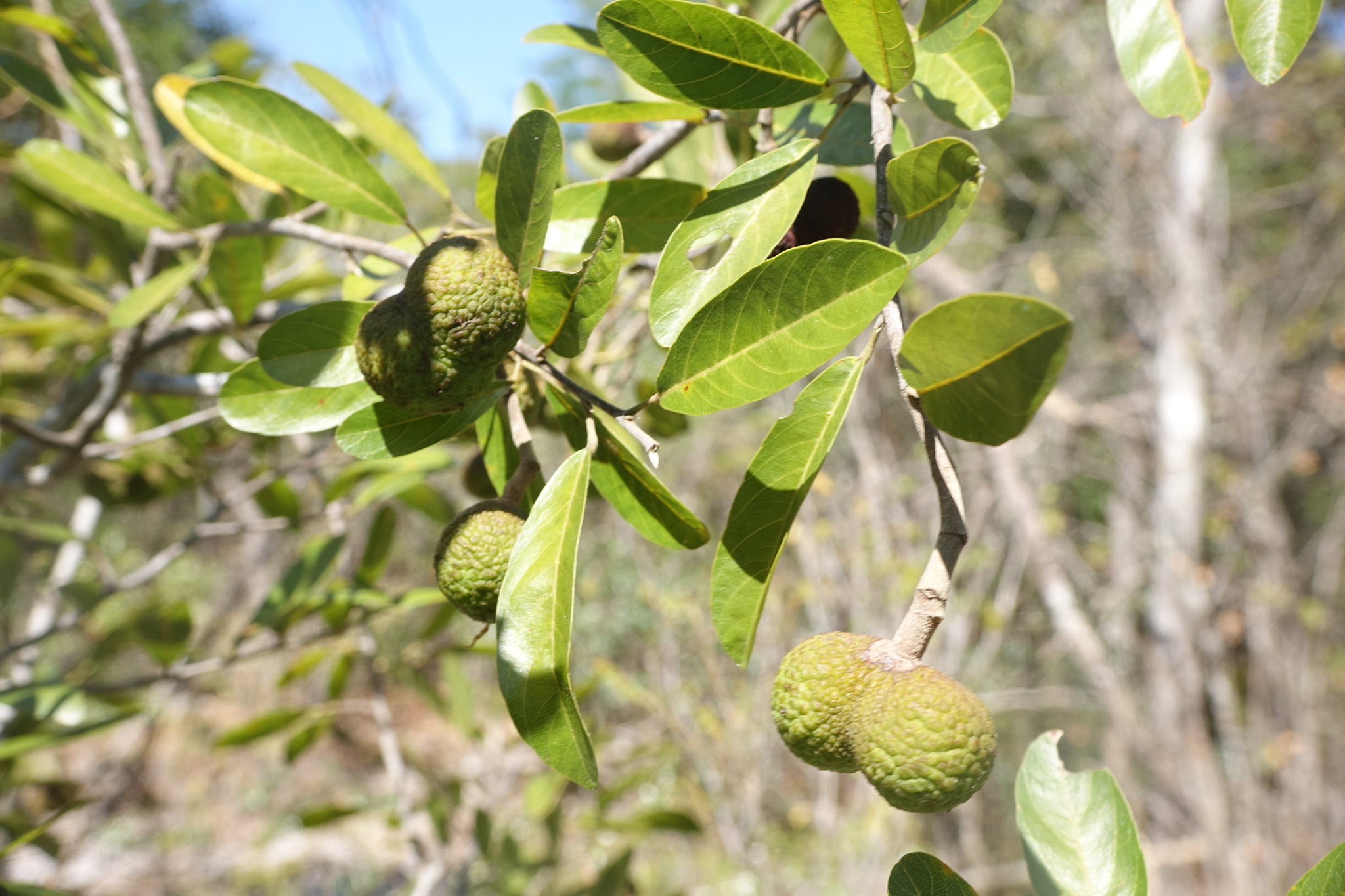
- Rhopalocarpus similis

Scientific classification
- Kingdom: Plantae
- Clade: Tracheophytes
- Clade: Angiosperms
- Clade: Eudicots
- Clade: Rosids
- Order: Malvales
- Family: Sphaerosepalaceae
- Genus: Rhopalocarpus; Bojer

Species
- See text

Synonyms
- Sphaerosepalum Baker

= Rhopalocarpus =

Genus of plant

Rhopalocarpus is a genus of plants in the family Sphaerosepalaceae. Most species are trees and all are endemic to Madagascar. The generic name is from the Greek meaning "club fruit", referring to the fruit shape.

== Species ==
Plants of the World Online and Tropicos recognise 17 accepted species:

- Rhopalocarpus alternifolius (Baker) Capuron
- Rhopalocarpus binervius Capuron
- Rhopalocarpus coriaceus (Scott-Elliot) Capuron
- Rhopalocarpus crassinervius (Capuron) G.E.Schatz, Lowry & A.-E.Wolf
- Rhopalocarpus excelsus Capuron
- Rhopalocarpus longipetiolatus Hemsl.
- Rhopalocarpus louvelii (Danguy) Capuron
- Rhopalocarpus lucidus Bojer
- Rhopalocarpus macrorhamnifolius Capuron
- Rhopalocarpus mollis G.E.Schatz & Lowry
- Rhopalocarpus parvifolius (Capuron) G.E.Schatz, Lowry & A.-E.Wolf
- Rhopalocarpus randrianaivoi G.E.Schatz & Lowry
- Rhopalocarpus similis Hemsl.
- Rhopalocarpus suarezensis Capuron ex Bosser
- Rhopalocarpus thouarsianus Baill.
- Rhopalocarpus triplinervius Baill.
- Rhopalocarpus undulatus Capuron
