= Dialyceras =

Scientific classification
- Kingdom: Plantae
- Clade: Tracheophytes
- Clade: Angiosperms
- Clade: Eudicots
- Clade: Rosids
- Order: Malvales
- Family: Sphaerosepalaceae
- Genus: Dialyceras; Capuron

Species
- See text

Genus of flowering plants

Dialyceras is a genus of trees in the family Sphaerosepalaceae. The species are all endemic to Madagascar.

== Species ==
Plants of the World Online and Tropicos accept 3 species:

- Dialyceras coriaceum (Capuron) J.-F.Leroy
- Dialyceras discolor (Capuron) J.-F.Leroy
- Dialyceras parvifolium Capuron
