= Galium collomiae =

Gila bedstraw

Scientific classification
- Kingdom: Plantae
- Clade: Tracheophytes
- Clade: Angiosperms
- Clade: Eudicots
- Clade: Asterids
- Order: Gentianales
- Family: Rubiaceae
- Genus: Galium
- Species: G. collomiae

Binomial name
- Galium collomiae J.T.Howell

Species of plant

Galium collomiae, the Gila bedstraw. is a plant species in the family Rubiaceae. It is native to Arizona and New Mexico. This species was named for Rose E. Collom
