= Picketpost Mountain =

Landform in Pinal County, Arizona

- Picketpost Mountain

Highest point
- Elevation: 4,378 ft (1,334 m) NAVD 88
- Prominence: 1,455 ft (443 m)
- Coordinates: 33°15′24″N 111°09′28″W

Geography
- Location within Arizona
- Location: Pinal County, Arizona, U.S.

Picketpost Mountain is located just outside the town of Superior, Arizona approximately 40 miles (64 km) east of the Phoenix Metro Area. The summit stands at an elevation of 4,375 feet (1,133 meters) above sea level, with a prominence 2000 feet above its base. The mountain is located in the southern desert region of Tonto National Forest near, but not within the Superstition Mountains, and is popular with hikers. The mountain is known for an oddly placed mailbox at the top of the mountain, which contains the log books for the Picketpost Mountain Trail.

The mountain's name stems from an early military camp established at the base of the mountain by General George Stoneman in 1870. The soldiers nicknamed the mountain “Picket Post” due to its use as a sentinel position to guard their camp from attacks. This military camp eventually grew into the town of Superior.
