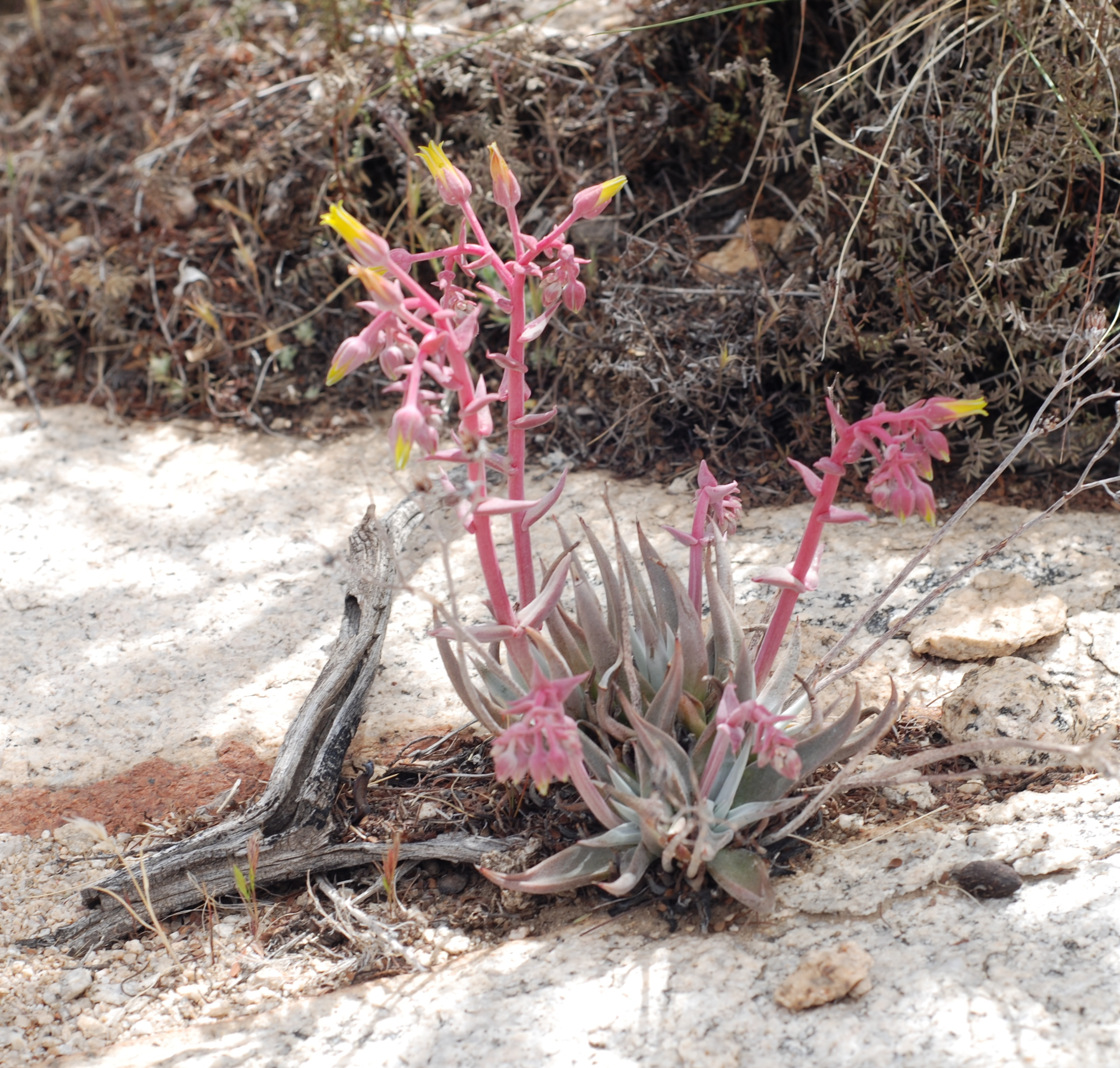

Conservation status
- Vulnerable (NatureServe)

Scientific classification
- Kingdom: Plantae
- Clade: Embryophytes
- Clade: Tracheophytes
- Clade: Spermatophytes
- Clade: Angiosperms
- Clade: Eudicots
- Order: Saxifragales
- Family: Crassulaceae
- Genus: Dudleya
- Species: D. saxosa
- Subspecies: D. s. subsp. aloides

Trinomial name
- Dudleya saxosa subsp. aloides (Rose) Moran

Synonyms
- Dudleya aloides Rose; Dudleya delicata Rose; Dudleya grandiflora Rose; Dudleya lanceolata var. aloides (Rose) Munz; Dudleya lanceolata var. composta Jeps.

= Dudleya saxosa subsp. aloides =

Desert dudleya

Subspecies of succulent plant

Dudleya saxosa subsp. aloides is a species of perennial succulent plant in the family Crassulaceae known by the common names desert dudleya or desert savior. It is a rosette-forming species widely distributed throughout the rocky parts of the Mojave and Sonoran deserts of California in the United States. It is characterized by bright-yellow or greenish-yellow flowers, and can be found in shaded crevices and slopes.

== Description ==
A rosette-forming succulent that may be evergreen or summer deciduous. It typically has bright yellow or green flowers.

This plant's basal rosette is formed on top of a caudex (stem), which is 1 to 3 cm in diameter. There are 1 to 4 rosettes, and they may be 6 to 23 cm wide. The leaves are typically 4 to 15 cm long, and 6 to 25 mm wide, 2 to 5 mm thick, and their base is 10 to 25 mm wide.

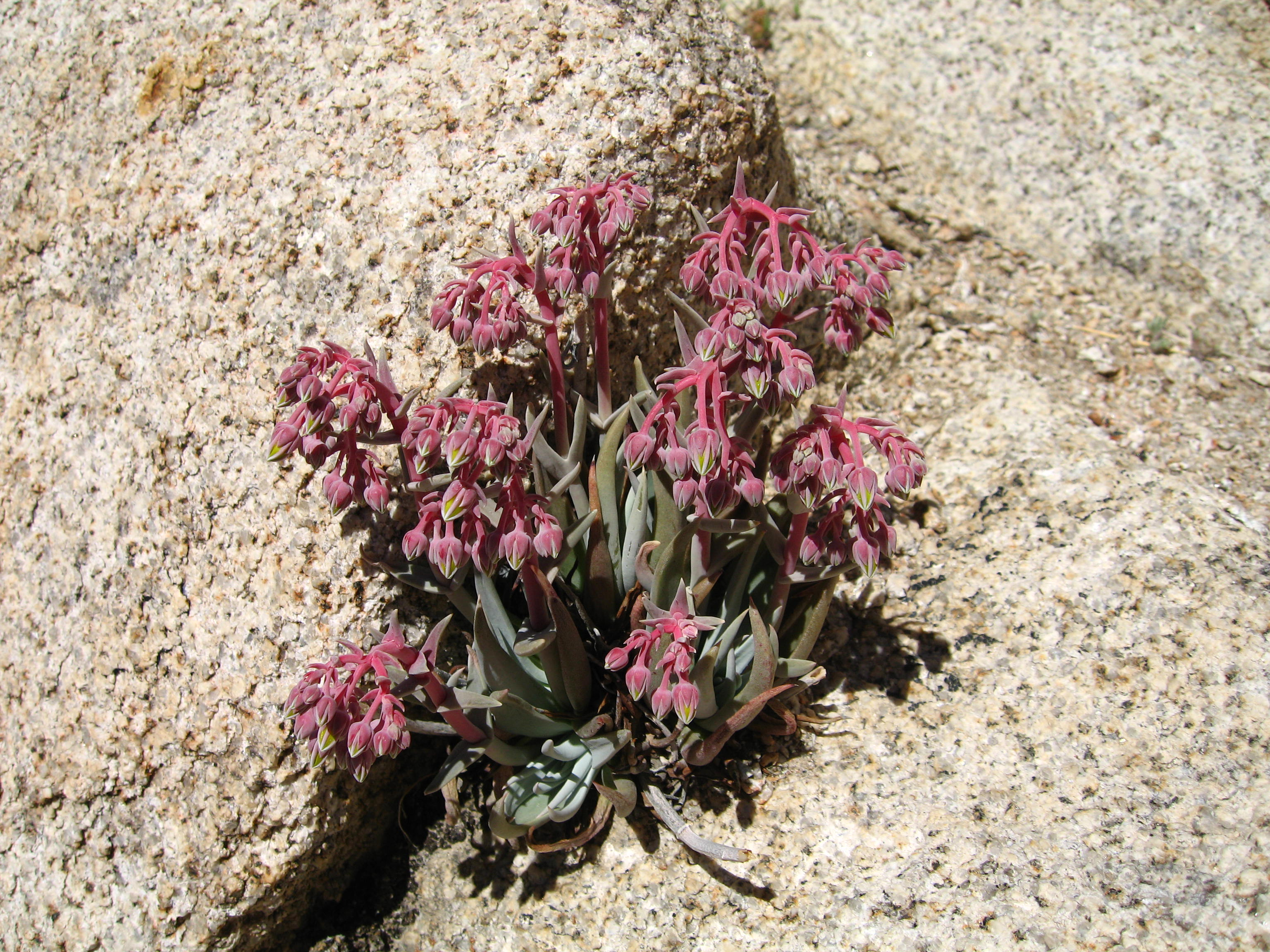
Growing in Joshua Tree National Park

The inflorescence has a peduncle 10 to 51 cm tall, and 1 to 9 mm wide. The lower internodes are spaced over 5 mm. The peduncle then branches 3 times, with the floral shoots colored red or green. The terminal branches (cincinni) are wavy, 1 to 12 cm long, and have 2 to 20 flowers. The sepals are around 4 to 6 mm long. The petals are 8 to 15 mm long, and are fused 1.5 to 3 mm. The petals are colored bright yellow or green, but rarely they are tinged with red. Flowering is from April to June

== Taxonomy ==
=== Taxonomic history ===
This species was described as Dudleya aloides in 1903, based on a specimen collected from San Diego County by Townshend Brandegee and examined by Nathaniel Lord Britton and Joseph Nelson Rose during their revision of North American Crassulaceae species. The two also described Dudleya grandiflora, from Whitewater near Banning, California, also collected by Brandegee. A third taxon, the comparatively diminutive Dudleya delicata, was also described by Britton and Rose, collected by LeRoy Abrams near Julian.

W.L. Jepson placed the species as Echeveria lanceolata var. composta. Reid Moran placed it as Dudleya lanceolata ssp. aloides in 1951. Moran eventually combined Dudleya aloides as a subspecies of Dudleya saxosa, forming the current combination in 1957. Dudleya grandiflora was recognized as synonymous with subspecies aloides, although the plants called grandiflora are slightly larger than typical subsp. aloides.

==== Dudleya alainae ====
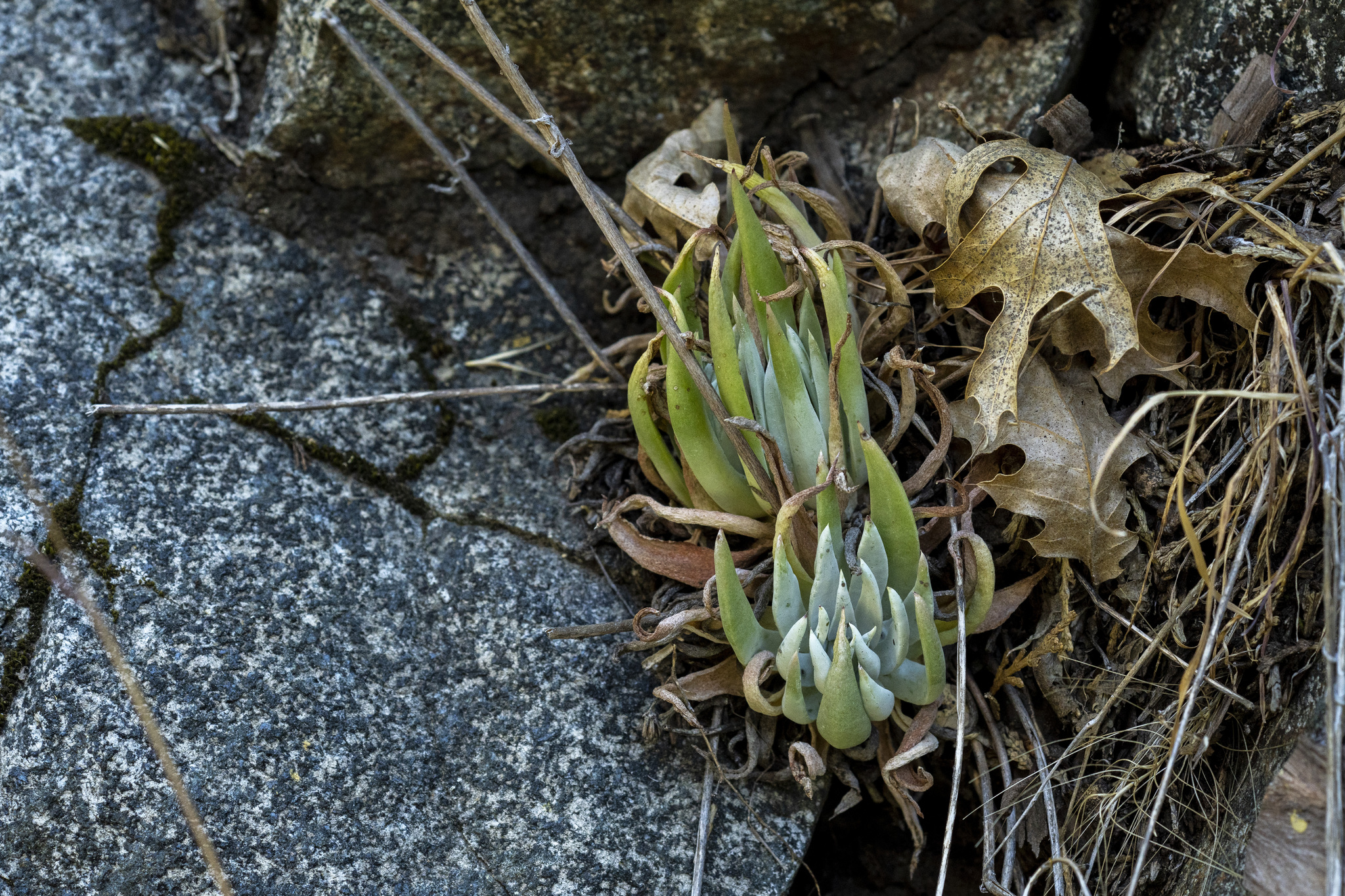
A plant that may be classified as Dudleya delicata or Dudleya alainae, growing in high-altitude coniferous forest on Palomar Mountain.

In 1984, botanist Craig H. Reiser recognized a number of Dudleya occurring on the eastern side of the Cuyamaca Mountains as Dudleya alainae, commonly known as the Banner dudleya. He recognized them as distinct based on diagnostic criteria that included sulphur-yellow flowers, (as opposed to bright yellow or greenish-yellow) a smaller inflorescence, and a montane coniferous forest habitat compared to the desert-dwelling subsp. aloides.

In 1986, another botanist, Kei M. Nakai, recognized Dudleya alainae as conspecific with Rose's Dudleya delicata species, and thus a synonym of Dudleya saxosa subspecies aloides. The group of plants variously referred to as Dudleya alainae or delicata approach the lowland Dudleya lanceolata, but may also resemble the montane Dudleya cymosa. The chromosome number is n = 17. The treatment by botanist Stephen W. McCabe in the Jepson eFlora regards Dudleya alainae and delicata as "in need of study."

=== Phylogeny ===
Dudleya saxosa subsp. aloides has a chromosome number of n = 17. Despite its placement in the species Dudleya saxosa, the other members, subsp. collomiae (n = 68) and subsp. saxosa ( n = 68, n = 85), are disjunct (geographically isolated) in distribution and polyploid. However, it also does not fit in with Dudleya lanceolata ( n = 34 ), as that species is tetraploid.

== Distribution and habitat ==
This species is found primarily in the Peninsular Ranges and on desert mountains in the Mojave and Sonoran deserts in California, USA. It likely does not occur in Mexico. Plants in the northernmost section of the distribution tend to be smaller, while plants near the type locality of Dudleya grandiflora, near Banning, are larger. Plants in western portion of the distribution in the Peninsular Ranges approach Dudleya lanceolata, and hybrids are expected. This species is found growing in rocky, shaded slopes and crevices.
