= Paul Auguste Danguy =

French botanist (1862–1942)

Paul Auguste Danguy (7 August 1862 in Gagny – 5 February 1942) was a French botanist.

From 1885 to 1928 he worked at the Muséum National d'Histoire Naturelle in Paris, where from 1913 onward, he served as deputy director in the laboratory of phanerogams. In 1888 he became a member of the Société botanique de France, in which, he was later named secretary (1891) and vice-president (1922).

As a taxonomist he circumscribed the botanical genera Decarydendron, Hedycaryopsis, Schrameckia, Terminaliopsis and Thouvenotia as well as numerous species. The genus Danguyodrypetes (family Putranjivaceae) was named in his honor by Jacques Désiré Leandri.

With Henri Lecomte, he was co-author of "Madagascar: les bois de la forêt d'Analamazaotra" (Madagascar; wood from the Analamazaotra forest, 1922).
