= Sphaerosepalaceae =

Scientific classification
- Kingdom: Plantae
- Clade: Tracheophytes
- Clade: Angiosperms
- Clade: Eudicots
- Clade: Rosids
- Order: Malvales
- Family: Sphaerosepalaceae; Tiegh.

Genera
- Dialyceras; Rhopalocarpus

Family of flowering plants

The Sphaerosepalaceae are a family of flowering plants including 14 species of trees and shrubs in two genera, Dialyceras and Rhopalocarpus, all of which are endemic to Madagascar. The family has previously been recognized as Rhopalocarpaceae.
