= Naelyn Pike =

Native American activist

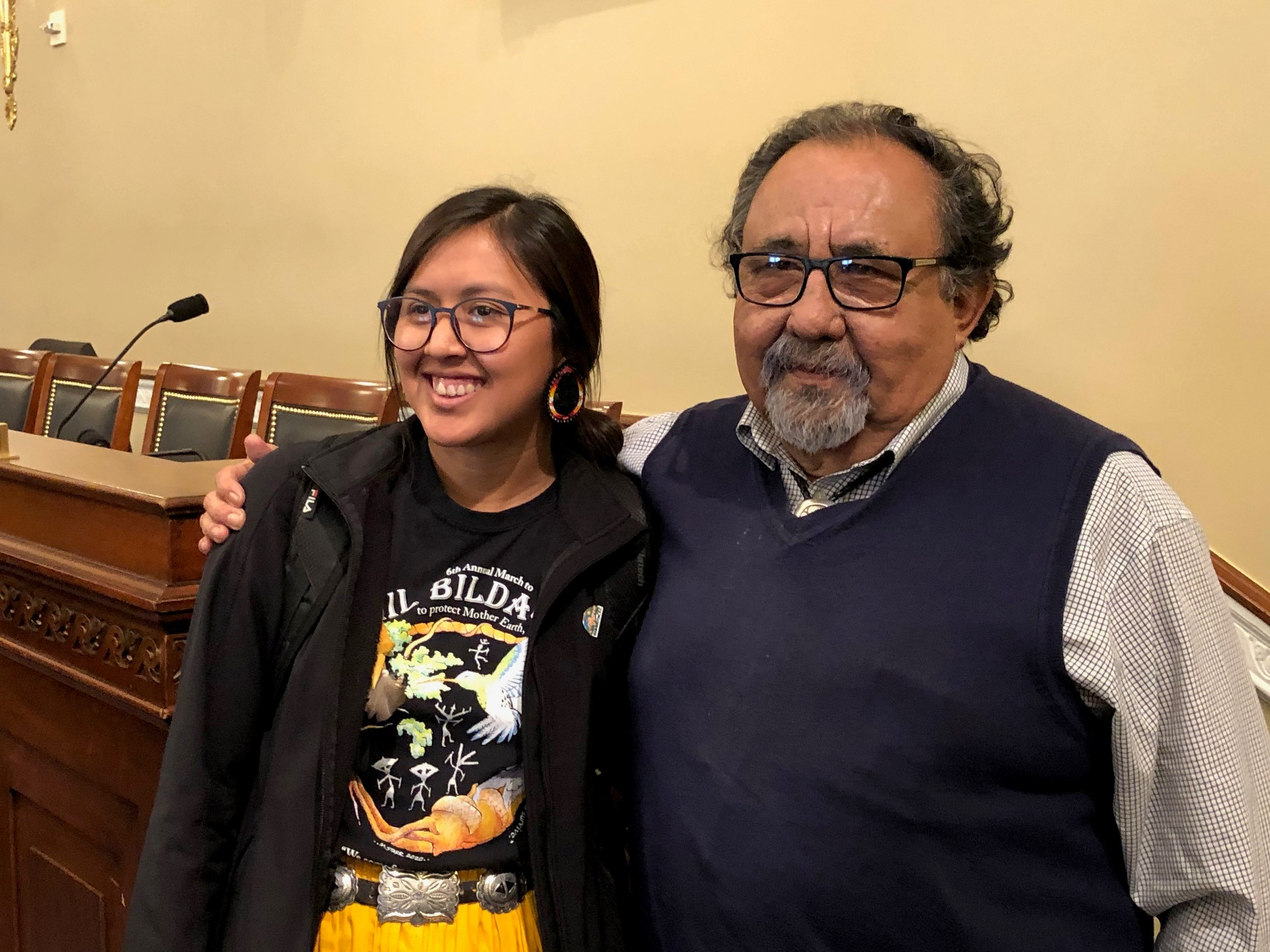
- Naelyn Pike in 2020 (on the left) at the hearing about Oak Flat mining operations before the United States House Committee
- Born: 2000 (age 25–26); Arizona, United States
- Citizenship: San Carlos Apache Tribe

Naelyn Pike, born in 2000, is a Native American activist and a member of the San Carlos Apache tribe.

At the age of 13 years old, she testified before the United States Congress regarding issues affective Native American communities, becoming the youngest individual to do so.

== Background & Education ==
She was raised on the San Carlos Apache Indian Reservation in Arizona. She is the granddaughter of Wendsler Nosie SR., former chairman of the San Carlos Apache tribe.

She identifies as Chiricahua Apache.

She graduated from Globe High School in 2017 and later attended Mesa Community College.

During her academic career, she was a member of the Center for Native American Youth, the National Honor Society and the National Society of High School Scholars.

== Career ==
She serves as secretary in the chairman's office of the San Carlos Apache tribe and co-leads with her grandfather and mothers, Vanessa Nosie, the Apache Stronghold. As a member of Apache Stronghold, Pike participates in spiritual ceremonial activities and long-distance runs organized to raise awareness of the threats to Oak Flat.

== Activism and Public advocacy ==
Naelyn Pike is known for her advocacy to protect Oak Flat, a site of religious and cultural significance to the Apache people, from proposed copper mining operations by Resolution Copper. The project has been widely debated due to its potential environmental impact.

At the age of 9, she held her first speaking engagement. In 2017, she delivered a keynote at Bionners explaining why young people must fight against racial and environmental injustice and has spoken at universities to raise awareness about native traditions and indigenous rights.

She testified before the United States Congress, a subcommittee event on behalf of the Apache youth. She stated that she had traveled from the San Carlos Apache Reservation in Southeastern Arizona, where her family has longstanding ancestral ties to the region. In her testimony, she focused on the experience of the Apache people, stating that in the late 19th century, the United States removed the Apache people from their land and moved them to prison of war. She emphasized that despite the erasure and displacement, the sacred site remain important for the Apache people.

During the annual Oak Flat march and prayer run in February 2025, Pike addressed supporters, highlighting the cultural and spiritual importance of Oak Flat to Apache people and expressing concern about the ongoing threat of land dispossession.

She was nominated by Canadian activist, Sarain Fox, in the human rights category of 35 under 35 for protecting sacred sites.
