= Southeast Arizona Land Exchange and Conservation Act of 2013 =

Proposed US federal law

- Long title: To facilitate the efficient extraction of mineral resources in southeast Arizona by authorizing and directing an exchange of Federal and non-Federal land, and for other purposes.
- Announced in: the 113th United States Congress
- Sponsored by: Rep. Paul A. Gosar (R, AZ-4)
- Number of co-sponsors: 4

Codification
- Acts affected: Federal Land Policy and Management Act of 1976, Sisk Act, National Environmental Policy Act of 1969, Land and Water Conservation Fund Act of 1965, and others
- U.S.C. sections affected: 25 U.S.C. § 450b, 42 U.S.C. § 4321 et seq., 16 U.S.C. § 4601-9, 43 U.S.C. § 1701 et seq., 30 U.S.C. § 1001 et seq., and others
- Agencies affected: United States Congress, United States Department of Agriculture, United States Forest Service, United States Department of the Interior, Bureau of Land Management, United States Department of Justice

Legislative history
- Introduced in the House as H.R. 687 by Rep. Paul A. Gosar (R, AZ-4) on February 14, 2013; Committee consideration by United States House Committee on Natural Resources, United States House Natural Resources Subcommittee on Energy and Mineral Resources, United States House Natural Resources Subcommittee on Public Lands and Environmental Regulation

The Southeast Arizona Land Exchange and Conservation Act of 2013 (H.R. 687) is a bill that was introduced into the United States House of Representatives during the 113th United States Congress. H.R. 687 would authorize a land exchange in Arizona between the federal government and a mining company. Under H.R. 687, the United States Forest Service would convey about 2,400 acres of land in southeast Arizona to Resolution Copper Mining LLC in exchange for about 5,400 acres of company-owned land. Of the company land, about 1,200 acres would become part of the National Forest System, and about 4,200 acres would be administered as conservation areas by the Bureau of Land Management. If the property sought by Resolution Copper is appraised at more than the appraised value of the property that the company offers for exchange, the company could donate additional land or make a cash payment to the United States to make the final exchange of equal value. If the company’s property is appraised for more than the federal acreage, the difference in the value would be considered a donation to the federal government. According to the Committee Report on the bill, the "mine could provide up to one-quarter of the nation's estimated annual copper needs" and the mining company estimates that the "total economic impact of the mine will exceed $60 billion and support 3,700 jobs annually." Opponents of the bill argue that the swap has not been thoroughly studied, that the mining company has failed to indicate where it will get much needed water for the mine, and that Native American tribes have not been properly consulted.

== Provisions of the bill ==
This summary is based largely on the summary provided by the Congressional Research Service, a public domain source.

The Southeast Arizona Land Exchange and Conservation Act of 2013 would authorize and direct the United States Department of Agriculture (USDA) (the Secretary), if Resolution Copper Mining, LLC offers to convey specified parcels of non-federal land in Gila, Yavapi, Maricopa, Coconino, Pinal, and/or Santa Cruz Counties, Arizona, that are acceptable to the Secretary or the United States Department of the Interior, to convey certain federal land in Pinal County, Arizona, to Resolution Copper. These federal lands would then be available to Resolution Copper for use for mining and related activities.

The bill would require the Secretary, if so requested by Resolution Copper, to issue separate special use permits to it to carry out mineral exploration activities: (1) under the Oak Flat Withdrawal Area from existing drill pads outside the Area, if they would not disturb the surface of the area; and (2) within the Withdrawal Area (with the exception of within the Oak Flat Campground), if they are conducted from a single exploratory drill pad which is located to minimize visual and noise impacts on the Campground.

The bill would make lands acquired by the Secretary under this Act part of the National Forest within which the land is located. It would also add certain of the non-federal land acquired by the Secretary of the Interior in Pinal and Santa Cruz Counties to the San Pedro Riparian and Las Cienegas National Conservation Areas, respectively.

The bill would instruct Resolution Copper to surrender, without compensation, the rights held by it under mining and other U.S. laws to commercially extract minerals under Apache Leap. It would also require Resolution Copper to make value adjustment payments to the United States based upon locatable minerals produced from the federal land in Pinal County, Arizona.

The bill would authorize the Secretary to issue to Resolution Copper special use permits that allow it to carry out underground activities (other than the commercial extraction of minerals) under the surface of Apache Leap that would not disturb the surface.

The bill would require preparation of a management plan for Apache Leap.

Finally, the bill would direct the Secretary to convey specified lands in Pinal County to the town of Superior, Arizona.

== Congressional Budget Office report ==
This summary is based largely on the summary provided by the Congressional Budget Office, a public domain source, as ordered reported by the House Committee on Natural Resources on May 15, 2013.

H.R. 687 would authorize a land exchange in Arizona between the federal government and a mining company. Based on information provided by the affected agencies, the Congressional Budget Office (CBO) estimates that implementing the bill would cost less than $500,000 annually, assuming the availability of appropriated funds. Those costs would include preparing management plans and administering private lands received in exchange for federal land.

Enacting the legislation could increase offsetting receipts, which are treated as reductions in direct spending; however, the CBO has insufficient information to estimate whether any receipts would be collected under the bill. Because enacting the bill could affect direct spending, pay-as-you-go procedures apply.

Under H.R. 687, the Forest Service would convey about 2,400 acres of land in southeast Arizona to Resolution Copper Mining LLC in exchange for about 5,400 acres of company-owned land. Of the company land, about 1,200 acres would become part of the National Forest System, and about 4,200 acres would be administered as conservation areas by the Bureau of Land Management.

If the property sought by Resolution Copper is appraised at more than the appraised value of the property that the company offers for exchange, the company could donate additional land or make a cash payment to the United States to make the final exchange of equal value. If the company’s property is appraised for more than the federal acreage, the difference in the value would be considered a donation to the federal government. Any cash payment received by the Forest Service would be deposited in the U.S. Treasury as an offsetting receipt. In addition, after completion of the exchange, Resolution Copper would have to pay the federal government a portion of any future income earned on the former federal property if the company determines that the actual cumulative production of minerals located on that property exceeds the value of the estimated production used in the original appraisal process.

The bill’s effect on offsetting receipts would depend on the outcome of formal appraisals of the federal and private properties that would be conducted after enactment. Those appraisals would determine the relative values of the properties affected by the exchange, including the value of mineral deposits that underlie the federal land. If the value of the federal land were to exceed the value of the company land, Resolution Copper could pay the government a lump sum equal to the difference in property values in the year or two following enactment. That payment might be significant; however, because there are no publicly available estimates regarding the quantity of copper underlying the federal land, the CBO has no basis for estimating the value of that land relative to the value of the company land. Therefore, we cannot determine whether the company would make a payment or estimate the size of any such payment.

In addition, if the company extracts more mineral resources than assumed in the original appraisal, Resolution Copper would make annual payments to the federal government. Such payments might be significant; however, based on information provided by Resolution Copper, the CBO expects that those lands would not be mined within 10 years of the enactment of H.R. 687. Therefore, no payments would be made over the next 10 years.

The bill contains no intergovernmental or private-sector mandates as defined in the Unfunded Mandates Reform Act and would impose no costs on state, local, or tribal governments.

== Procedural history ==
=== House ===
The Southeast Arizona Land Exchange and Conservation Act of 2013 was introduced into the House on February 14, 2013 by Rep. Paul A. Gosar (R, AZ-4). It was referred to the United States House Committee on Natural Resources, the United States House Natural Resources Subcommittee on Energy and Mineral Resources, and the United States House Natural Resources Subcommittee on Public Lands and Environmental Regulation. On May 15, 2013, it was ordered reported (amended) by a vote of 23-19. House Report 113-167 on the bill was released on July 22, 2013 and the bill was placed on Union Calendar 121 at that time. The House Majority Leader Eric Cantor placed the bill on the House Schedule on September 13, 2013 for consideration under a suspension of the rules on September 17.

== Debate and discussion ==
Opponents of the bill give several reasons for their opposition. One objection is that the bill forces the exchange to proceed too quickly, since it waives some requirements for analysis of the effects of the land swap and mine. Another objection to the bill is that the mining company has failed to indicate where it would get all of the water it needs to run the mine, since the mine is expected to require 40,000 acre-feet of water each year, roughly the amount used by the city of Tempe (with 160,000 people). Another objection is that the two mining companies that own resolution Copper are foreign businesses. Finally, opponents objected to the lack of consultation with Native Americans tribes about the land swap.

== See also ==
- List of bills in the 113th United States Congress
- Resolution Copper Mining LLC
- Copper mining in Arizona
