= Silver mining in Arizona =

Silver-mining districts in Arizona

Silver mining in Arizona was a powerful stimulus for exploration and prospecting in early Arizona. Cumulative silver production through 1981 totaled 490 million troy ounces (15 million kg). However, only about 10% of Arizona's silver production came from silver mining. More than 80% of the state's silver was a byproduct of copper mining; other silver came as a byproduct of lead, zinc, and gold mining.

== The Spanish and Mexican eras ==
Silver ore was first discovered in west-central Arizona in 1583 by Spanish explorer Antonio de Espejo, but no mining resulted. Again in 1598, Juan de Oñate led another expedition searching for Espejo’s silver; many claims were staked, but the expeditioners returned to Santa Fe without mining any silver, and the deposits remained unexploited. Espejo’s silver discovery is thought to be at the site of present-day Jerome, which later became a major copper-mining district.

Father Eusebio Kino, in charge of the Spanish missions in southern Arizona from 1687 to 1711, noted a number of “minas” in the mountains bordering the Santa Cruz valley (present Santa Cruz County, Arizona), but the Spanish word “mina” can mean either a mine or an unexploited mineral deposit. A noted silver discovery in 1736 at Planchas de Plata, Sonora, just south of the present Arizona/Sonora border drew attention to the silver potential of the area. Later Spanish documents record mining in the 1770s in Quijotoa, Arabic, and Arivaca, in southernmost Arizona. Mining was held back because Arizona was the northern fringe of the Spanish frontier, and plagued by guerilla war with the Apaches.

== Start of American mining in Arizona ==
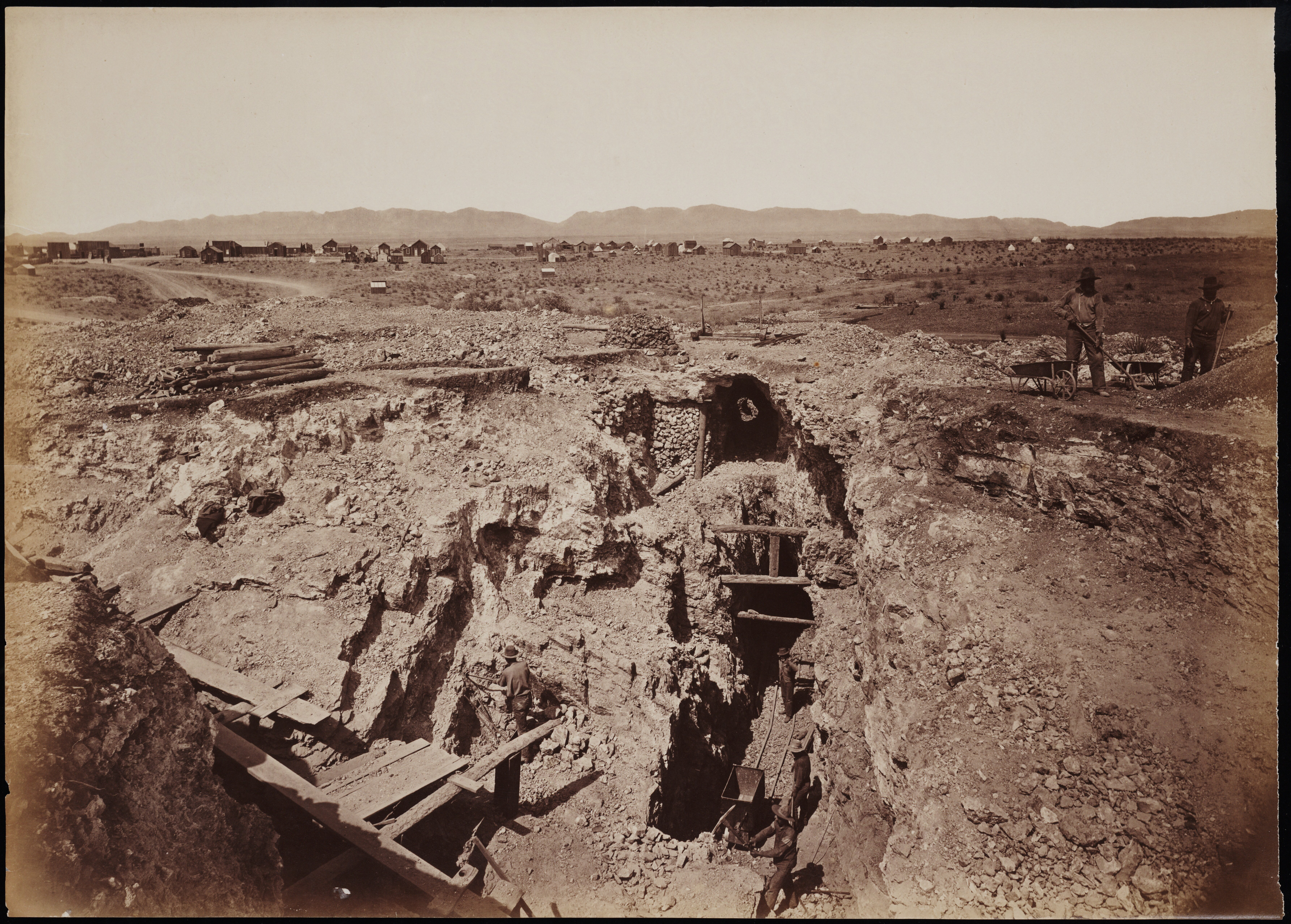
Entrance to the Tough Nut Mine in Tombstone, Arizona Territory.

When southern Arizona became a United States possession by virtue of the Gadsden Purchase of 1853, American prospectors and investment started mining silver deposits previously known to the Spanish and Mexicans in present Santa Cruz and Pima counties. The Santa Rita mine in the Santa Rita Mountains and the Heintzelman mine in the Cerro Colorado Mountains both started in 1856, the Mowry mine in the Patagonia Mountains started in 1857, and the Salero mine in 1858.

American prospecting and silver mining in the Santa Rita Mountains on the east side of the Santa Cruz Valley led to conflicts with the Apaches, known as the Apache Wars. One Apache raid killed all but one employee of the Santa Rita mine.

== Arizona silver belt ==
Silver was discovered at Globe in 1873, and within three years numerous other silver mines were operating near Globe, Pinal, and McMillenville, in Gila and Pinal counties.

A soldier named Sullivan discovered native silver while building a military road in central Arizona. Sullivan returned to the area after he left the army, but could not relocate the outcrop. However, Sullivan told his story to rancher named Mason, who with four others found Sullivan’s lost silver lode 3 miles (4.8 km) north of present-day Superior, and started the Silver King Mine in 1875. The Silver King mine operated from 1875 to 1889, and again 1918 to 1928, producing 6.2 million troy ounces (190 metric tons) of silver.

The success of the Silver King drew other prospectors, who discovered the Silver Queen mine nearby. The Silver Queen shut down around 1893. Investors bought the property in 1910, renamed the Silver Queen the Magma mine, and started mining the rich copper ores that the silver miners had ignored. The Magma copper mine became one of the most productive copper mines in Arizona, and through 1964, produced more than 25 million troy ounces (780 metric tons) of silver as a byproduct of copper mining.

Miners exhausted the best silver ores in the area by the mid-1880s, most of the mines closed, and most of the towns were deserted. But attention turned to copper veins, and the former “Arizona silver belt” became the rich Globe-Miami and Superior copper districts.

=== Bradshaw Mountains ===
The first big silver strike in the Bradshaw Mountains was at Tiger, Arizona, Yavapai County, in 1871. The Peck mine at Alexandra was discovered in 1875. That same year silver was discovered at Tip Top.

=== Bisbee (Warren district) ===
In 1876, a soldier and an army scout staked mining claims over silver mineralization at Bisbee. Bisbee later produced more silver than any other district in Arizona, 102 million troy ounces, but mostly as a byproduct to copper mining. Bisbee is historically the 10th-largest silver producing district in the US.

=== Tombstone district ===
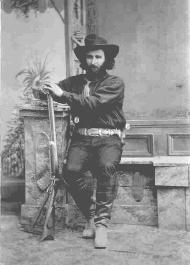
Ed Schieffelin discovered silver in the Tombstone district in 1877

Silver was discovered in the Cochise County mountains as early as 1858, but ongoing conflict with the native Indians prevented development. In 1858, Frederick Brunckow, a Prussian-born mining engineer, built a cabin near the San Pedro River after finding a small silver deposit nearby. He hired three other white men and about a dozen Mexican miners. In September 1860, two of the white men were robbed and murdered at the cabin and Brunckow was found dead in the mine with a rock drill through him. The German cook blamed the Mexican workers for the murders. The cabin was the site of 22 murders during the frontier days.

After briefly serving as a scout for the United States Army during 1877, Ed Schieffelin began prospecting for silver in the hills east of the San Pedro River. He used Brunckow's San Pedro mine as a base for operations to prospect among the rocky outcroppings northeast of the cabin. The area was only about 12 miles (19 km) from the hostile Chiricahua Apache Indians led by Cochise, Geronimo and Victorio. The soldiers at the fort told him, "The only stone you will find out there will be your own tombstone". He decided to stay put and explore the hills east full-time.

After many months, Schieffelin finally located loose silver ore that had been eroded from the nearby hills into a dry wash. It took him several more months to find the source. When he located the vein, he estimated the vein to be fifty feet long and twelve inches wide. The vein of silver ore was above the San Pedro River Valley, on a waterless plateau called Goose Flats. He filed the claim under the name "Tombstone" in remembrance of the soldiers' jests.

With only 30 cents in his pocket, Schieffelin searched for his brother Al, who he had not seen in four years, and finally found him at the McCracken Mine in north-eastern Arizona. He persuaded Al to show his three remaining ore samples to the recently arrived assayer, Richard Gird, who had a reputation as an expert. Gird told Ed that the best of the three samples was a high-quality ore that assayed at $2,000 a ton. Ed, Al Schieffelin and Richard Gird formed a handshake partnership on the spot. Gird offered his expertise, connections, and a grubstake. Their three-way deal, which was never put down on paper, realized the three men millions of dollars of wealth.

News of the mines spread and interest from the Eastern United States grew. As that interest increased, so did the capital investment into the mines around what would become Tombstone. Many mines were located and developed, including (but not limited to) the Goodenough, Contention, Toughnut and Grand Central.

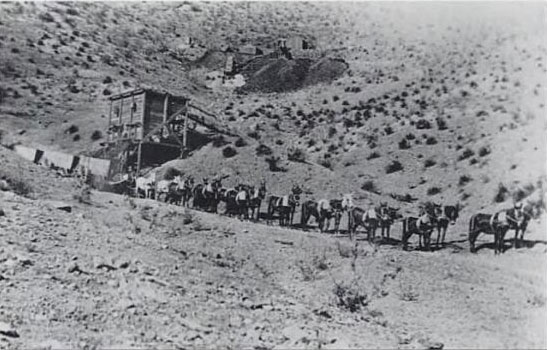
A team of mules are hitched to a series of ore wagons to haul the ore from a Tombstone area mine to the stamping mill.

As the mining industry grew, Tombstone spawned three nearby sister towns that took up the chore of stamping and processing the ore. Charleston, Millville, and Contention were all on the San Pedro River to take advantage of the water needed to run the mills. All are ghost towns today.

The mines operated successfully and in late March 1881 water was found in the Sulphuret shaft at 520 ft below the surface. Other mines in the area encountered water within a year.

At first, the water was looked upon as a Godsend. The mines could pump it to the surface, store it in tanks and use it in the recovery process of the ores. This would eliminate the transportation costs of hauling the ore to the mills located on the San Pedro River, 6 to 8 miles away (depending on which mine was transporting ore to their mill). Transportation costs were about $4.00 to $5.00 per ton with an average of 14 tons per trip. Cornish pumps were installed and the deepening of the mines continued. As the mines deepened, controlling the water became more cumbersome. Pumps add increased costs to the company and if the ore is not of sufficient quality, the cost to operate overwhelms the value of the product. One by one, the mines were forced to shut down or declare bankruptcy as they ran out of usable ore. By the end of 1893, all silver production in Tombstone was halted and the mines abandoned.

In 1900 E. B. Gage, Frank Murphy, and William Staunton consolidated their various mining properties into a single entity, the Tombstone Consolidated Mines Company. They started efforts to drain the mines, laid a rail spur into town, and re-commenced mining. By using modern technology (for 1901), they installed high efficiency water pumps that pumped 4,000,000 gallons of water per day in a 24-hour period, with a capacity of 7,000,000 if needed. It took six years to bring the water under control to the 1,000 ft level of the "Boom" shaft. Immediately, mining commenced in sections below the water table as the shaft was deepened. All levels were operating on May 31, 1909 when the inevitable happened. A tank car of contaminated fuel oil was fed into the boilers and snuffed the fires.

Without the steam to operate the system, the pumps failed and the water rose. Not willing to give in, the company fought the good fight and charged on. They fought the water for almost a year and even added additional horsepower with more boilers coming online. On May 1, 1910 the boilers failed after being pushed to their limits. Still the company charged on. They continued to fight the water and by December 1910, finally won the battle, bringing the water back to the 1000 ft level. But the damage had already been done. Low ore values, lost production and the expense of many millions of dollars to fight the water drove the company into bankruptcy. On January 18, 1911 the company closed the mine. On August 9, 1911 the Tombstone Consolidated Mines Company, LTD., was declared bankrupt. They had won the battle, but lost the war. Phelps-Dodge Corporation bought the claims for $500,000 at a Sheriff's auction. They were the only bidders.

During World War I the camp was revived, not as a silver producer but as the nation's foremost supplier of manganese, a strategic metal. In 1917 the district's work force was larger than at any time in its history.

During the silver boom, it is generally agreed that Tombstone was the most prolific silver producer of any mining district in Arizona that was mined primarily for silver. The district produced 32 million troy ounces (1,000 metric tons) of silver. There are widely varying estimates of the value of gold and silver mined during the course of Tombstone's history. In 1883, writer Patrick Hamilton estimated that during the first four years of activity the mines produced about $25,000,000 (approximately $864 million today). Other estimates include $40 to $85 million (about $1.43 billion to $3.05 billion today).

=== Pearce district ===
A rancher discovered the silver lode of the Commonwealth mine in Cochise County in 1892. At its peak the adjacent town of Pearce had 1,900 inhabitants; it is now virtually a ghost town with few residents and only one or two small shops. The district produced 12 million ounces (370 metric tons) of silver.

== After the silver boom ==
Silver mining declined after the demonetization of silver in 1893, yet the boom in copper mining was soon producing more silver as a byproduct than had been produced during the bonanza silver days.

In 2006, all the silver produced in Arizona came as a byproduct of copper mining. Renewed mining is planned for the Tombstone district.

As of Nov. 2017, the Goodenough Mine is open again for tours down to the 100' level. It is a hardrock mine, connected underground to the Toughnut and Girard mines, which may also be opened for tours in 2018.

== See also ==
- Copper mining in Arizona
