= Charleston, Arizona =

- Ghost town
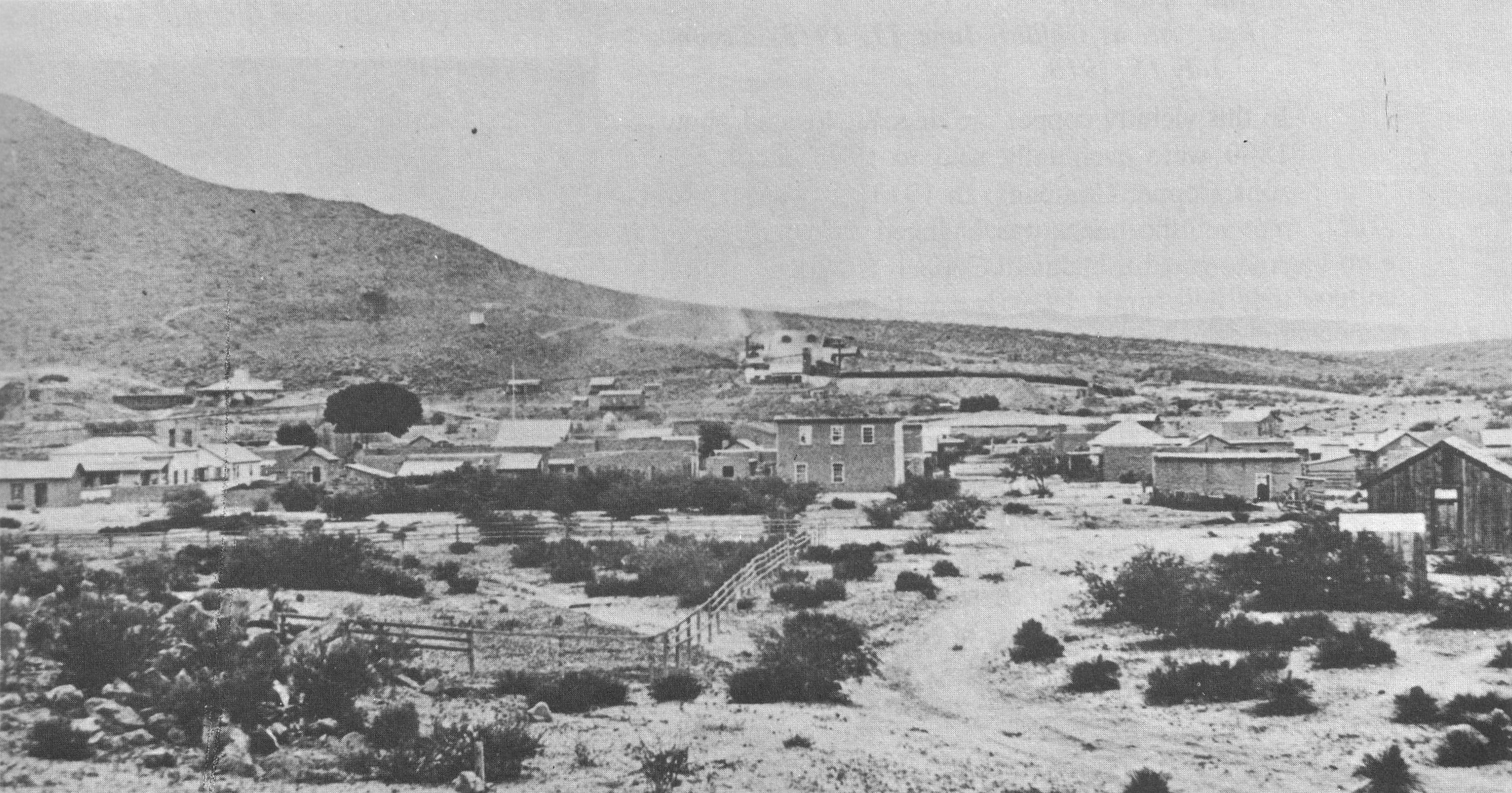
- Charleston, circa 1885

- Location within Arizona Location within the United States
- Coordinates: 31°38′09″N 110°10′21″W
- Country: United States
- State: Arizona
- County: Cochise
- Founded: 1879
- Abandoned: 1888
- Named after: Charles D. Handy
- Elevation: 3,989 ft (1,216 m)

Population (2009)
  - Total: 0
- Time zone: UTC-7 (MST (no DST))
- Post Office opened: April 17, 1879
- Post Office closed: October 24, 1888
- GNIS feature ID: 24360

Charleston is a ghost town in Cochise County in the southeastern part of the U.S. state of Arizona. It was occupied from the late-1870s through the late-1880s, and was located in what was then known as the Arizona Territory. Located on the west bank of the San Pedro River, Charleston's economy was based on milling silver ore mined from nearby Tombstone in the community of Millville, located directly across the river.

== Geography ==
Charleston is located on the west bank of the San Pedro River, about 9 miles (14 km) southwest of Tombstone. Millville is located directly across the river, on the east bank.

== History ==
Charleston was originally settled as a residence for the mill workers in Millville, on the opposite bank of the San Pedro River, where two mills were built to process ore from the silver mines of nearby Tombstone. The mills were constructed in Millville due to a lack of water, needed for refinement, in the immediate vicinity of Tombstone. The mills, one operated by the Tombstone Mill and Mining Company and the other by the Corbin Mill and Mining Company, processed or "stamped" the silver ore into fine powder in preparation for smelting. The mills began operations in 1879, and at their peak from 1881–1882, they processed almost $1.4 million in silver bullion in one year.

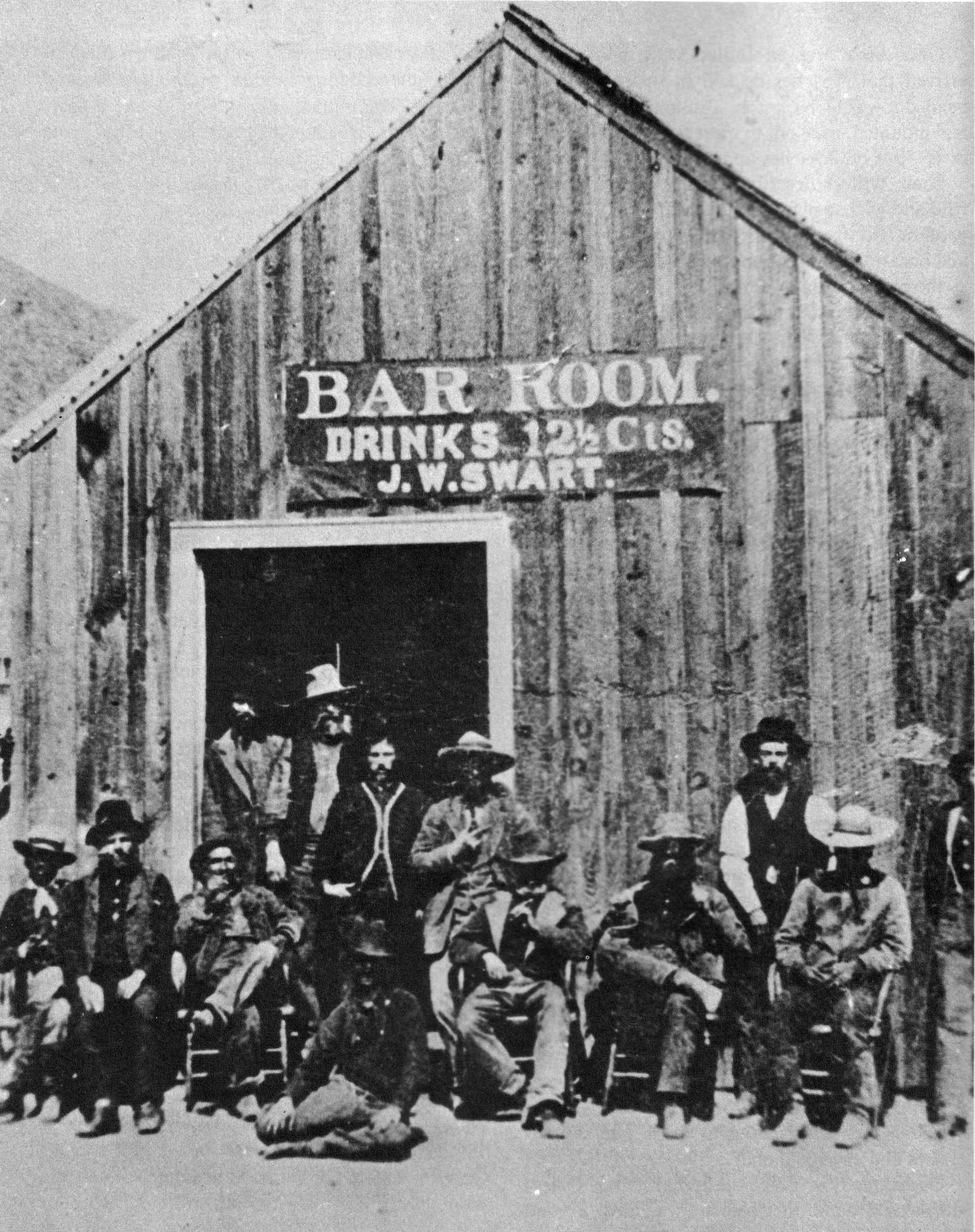
J.W. Swart's Saloon in Charleston, circa 1885

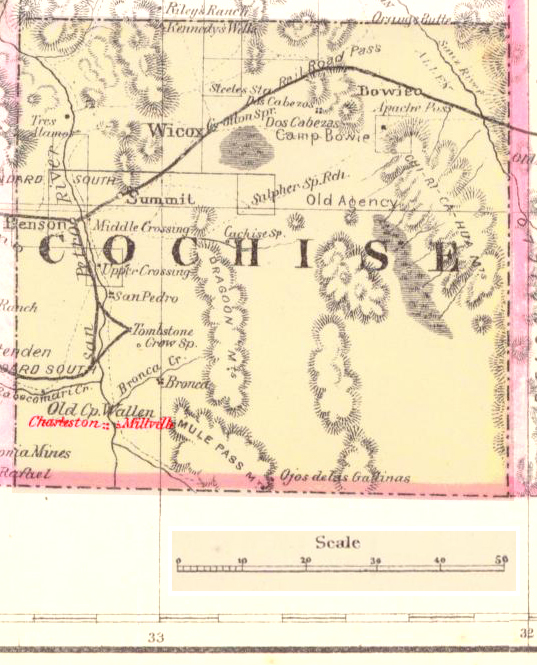
Map of Cochise County, circa 1882, with Charleston and Millville highlighted.

Once the future site of Tombstone's mills was established, the land that was to become Charleston was claimed by Amos Stowe on October 28, 1878, and planning for the town began immediately thereafter. The town consisted of twenty-six blocks with sixteen lots each, laid out in a grid. Due to an attractive leasing system set up by Stowe, businesses flocked to Charleston, and by May 1879, the town already housed approximately 40 buildings, including a post office which opened on April 17, 1879. Millville's post office opened shortly after Charleston's, on May 26, 1879, but shut down less than a year later on May 3, 1880, as it became clear that Charleston was to be the primary residence for the people of both towns. While Millville was named for its primary function as a milling location, Charleston took its name from its original postmaster, Charles D. Handy.

The 1880 United States census recorded the population as 350 people, and the town's permanent population likely peaked at over 400 a few years later during the height of Tombstone's silver boom. At its peak, the town housed a post office, four restaurants, a school, a church, a doctor, a lawyer, a drugstore, two blacksmiths, two livery stables, two butcher shops, two bakeries, a hotel, five general stores, a jewelry shop, a carpenter, a brickyard, a brewery, and at least four saloons. One of the butcher shops in town was owned by noted frontier lawman John H. Slaughter.

=== Reputation ===
The town had a wild and lawless reputation, largely perpetuated by newspapers on the east coast. Noted outlaw Frank Stilwell owned a saloon in Charleston, before selling it to Jacob W. Swart in 1881. In addition, the Clanton Ranch, owned by "Old Man" Clanton, and run by his sons John, Phin, Ike and Billy, was located just five miles south of town. Some of the most infamous figures in the territory at the time were employed by or associated with the Clanton Ranch, including the Clantons themselves, Johnny Ringo, "Curly Bill" Brocius, Pete Spence, and Frank and Tom McLaury.

Despite its reputation and its infamous residents, the town never suffered a single successful robbery of either silver or money at the hands of outlaws, though a failed robbery of the Tombstone Mining Company which resulted in the murder of mining engineer M. R. Peel was recorded in Millville on March 25, 1882. In addition, The Tombstone Epitaph on May 6, 1882, said of Charleston that it was "well regulated and free from turmoil" and that it was "one of the most peaceful places we were ever in."

Charleston was also known for Justice of the Peace James Burnett. Burnett was, by all accounts, a corrupt and violent individual. After a disagreement with the Cochise County Board of Supervisors who ostensibly supervised Burnett's action, Burnett declared that he would run his court independently. From that point on, he was said to administer justice on the spot, outside of his courtroom, in the form of fines that he personally pocketed. Burnett's fines were diverse, including anything from cattle to cash, and ranged from nine cords of wood for theft, through one thousand dollars when saloon owner Jacob Swart shot and killed a man. In the absence of other governmental representatives, Burnett became the de facto dictator of Charleston until the town was abandoned around 1889, at which time he left Charleston and became Justice of the Peace in nearby Pearce. He was shot and killed in Tombstone in July 1897 by William Greene, a local rancher who believed that Burnett blew up a dam which led to the death of Greene's daughter. There is no known surviving evidence that Burnett was responsible for the dam explosion, though Greene and Burnett did have a history of altercation.

=== Decline ===
When the silver mines in Tombstone flooded in 1886, the mills were forced to shut down, and Charleston and Millville went into steep decline. The large Sonoran earthquake that struck on May 3, 1887, accompanied by more than thirty minutes of aftershocks, left all of the town's adobe structures in ruins, and sealed the town's fate. The town was quickly abandoned as none of the structures remained habitable. The Charleston Post Office shut down on October 24, 1888, and by 1889, both Charleston and Millville were already ghost towns.

Charleston's population was 15 in the 1960 census.

== Remnants ==
After it was abandoned, Charleston was briefly inhabited in the 1890s by a small population of Mexican immigrants who furthered the town's dismantling by using what was left of the wooden structures for kindling. Later, during World War II, the United States Army used Charleston as a practice site for urban combat, often using live ammunition. The site was known to the soldiers of nearby Fort Huachuca as "Little Tunisia" due to its climatic and geographic similarity to Tunisia in Africa. These activities, in and around 1943, led to further deterioration of the site. The town's location on the very bank of the San Pedro River also contributed to the demise of the town's remains as cliff erosion literally ate away at the land and the adobe structures.

All that is left of Charleston today are a few adobe ruins and scattered pieces of stone foundations, all of which are hidden amongst the underbrush. Across the river in Millville, a few stone embankments are all that remain of the mills. What little is left of the local cemetery is approximately a mile and a half north of the Charleston site, though it is difficult to locate, and very few traces remain. The site is part of the San Pedro Riparian National Conservation Area (NCA) maintained by the Bureau of Land Management.

Charleston and Millville are not accessible by car and can only be reached by hiking up the San Pedro River. While trails were rough and unmarked for many years, the Bureau of Land Management has begun maintaining trails to and from the area. The remains of the town can be found on the west bank of the river with Millville's ruins directly across the river on the east bank.

== See also ==
- American Old West
- Boomtown
- History of Arizona
- List of ghost towns in Arizona
- Gunfight at the O.K. Corral
- Silver mining in Arizona
