= Hotel Magma =

Historic hotel in Superior, Arizona, US

- Magma Hotel
- U.S. National Register of Historic Places
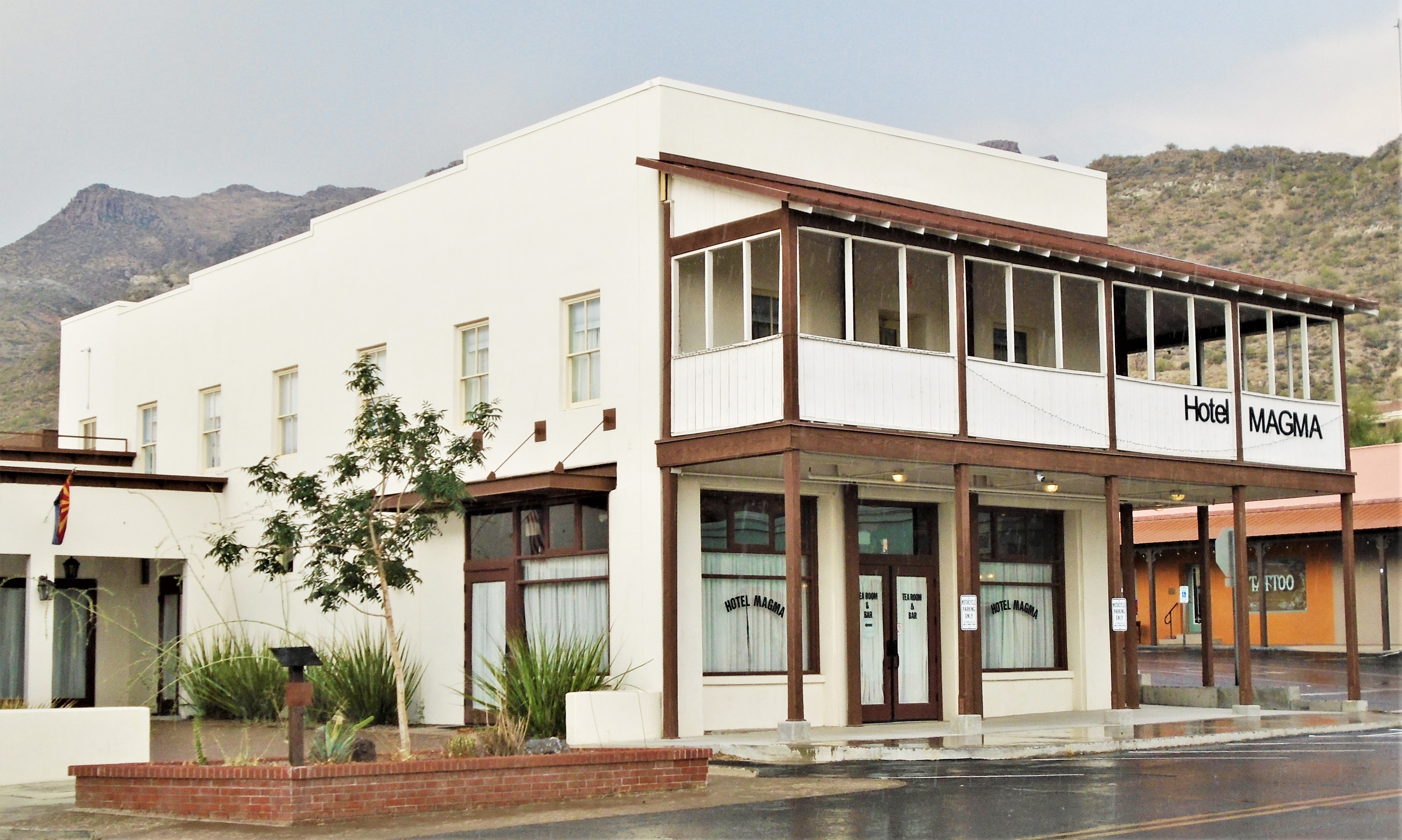
- The restored and renovated original 1912 building (2021)

- Location within Arizona Location within the United States
- Location: 100-130 Main Street, Superior, Arizona
- Coordinates: 33°17′38″N 111°5′45″W
- Built: 1912, 1916, 1923
- Architect: John Davey (1923 addition)
- Architectural style: Mission Revival
- Website: www.hotelmagmasuperior.com
- NRHP reference No.: 94000981
- Added to NRHP: August 19, 1994

The Hotel Magma, is a historic hotel located at 100-130 Main Street between North Magma Avenue and Magma Alley in Superior, Arizona. The hotel's initial structure is a two-store reinforced concrete building at 100 Main Street. An adobe addition was built in 1916 but collapsed in 2007. In 1923 a brick addition, labelled "Macpherson's Hotel Magma" was constructed by John Davey at 130 Main Street. All three structures were designed in the Mission Revival style

The hotel was listed on the National Register of Historic Places in 1994 under the name "Magma Hotel". It closed in 1992 and reopened after restoration and renovation in 2019.

== History ==
In 1902, Canadian John McPherson came to Superior from nearby Globe to make his fortune in the booming mining town. He purchased four lots in Block 12 in 1912, and began to build the Magma Hotel, using reinforced concrete, one of its earliest uses for a commercial building in Arizona. McPherson got the idea to use concrete from its use to rebuild the town of Ray, Arizona after a devastating fire. At the time, the vast majority of structures in Superior were made of wood; the hotel was the first concrete building in town, although others were constructed throughout the Superior's building boom, which lasted until 1917.

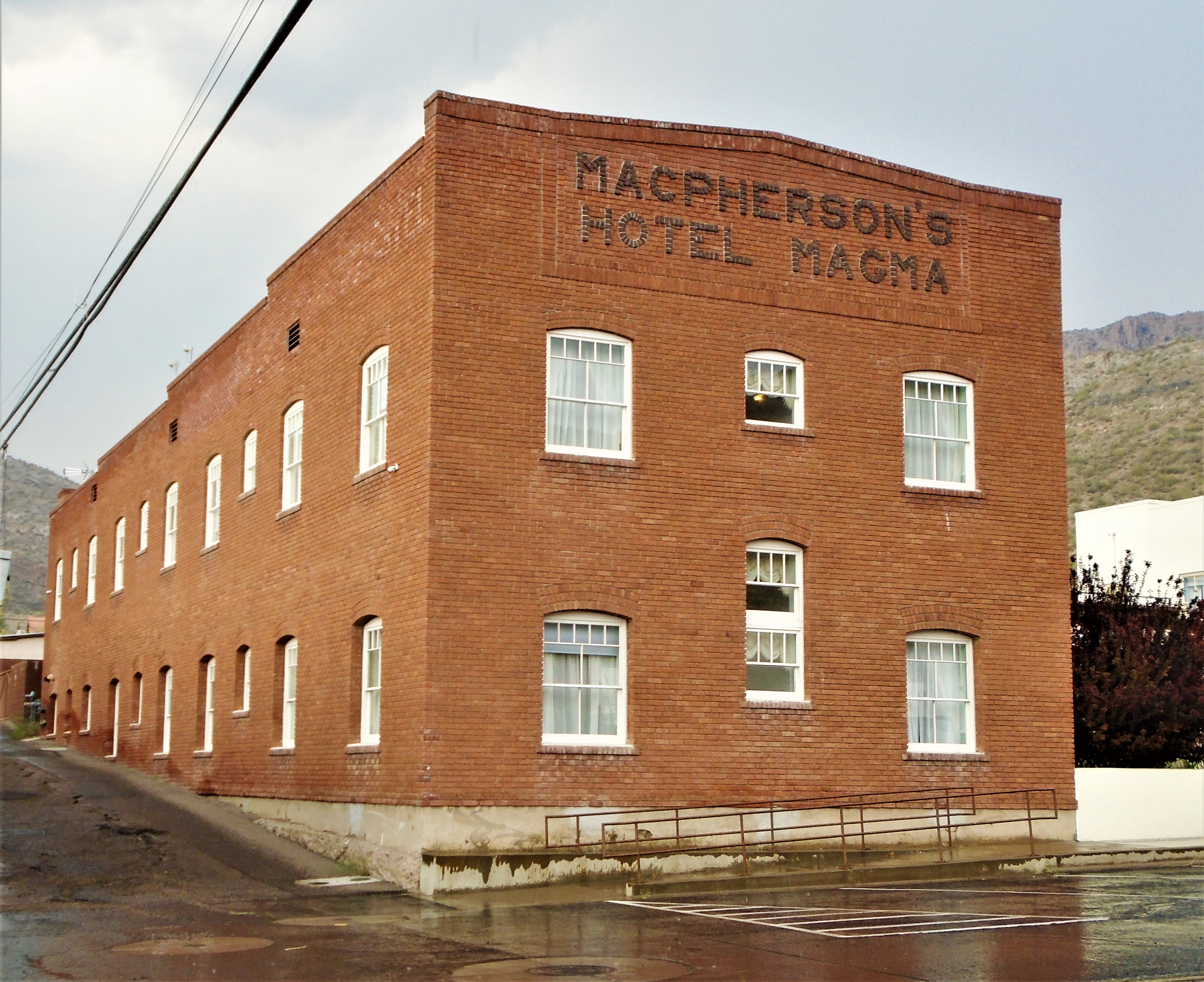
The 1923 brick addition (2021)

In 1917, an integrated Delco Light system was installed in the hotel, the first in Superior, consisting of a gas-powered electric generator and multiple batteries. It had the capacity of operating 47-62 lights, depending on the system.

The 1923 brick addition was constructed with bricks made locally in the Superior area; the contractor was John Davey, a prominent local architect and builder. At the time of its construction, the 1923 addition was seen as one of the finest examples of Davey's work. The 1912 and 1923 buildings have a concrete foundation, while the 1916 adobe addition sat on wood blocks and jacks which sat on bare earth.

One of the building's primary interior features is a grand staircase from the lobby to the second floor. The hotel was utilized as both a boarding house and a hotel, it later offered professional offices to attorneys, realtors, and insurance agents. The building had a restaurant, the Magma Cafe, which in 1918 was leased by O. C. Hing, a drug store in the East Wing. and a barbershow. In the 1920s, a screened-in sleeping porch for men was added, used seasonally by miners in the boom town, and a phone booth was installed in the lobby. The hotel was also a stop on the Greyhound Bus Phoenix–Ray–Superior Stage Line.

John McPherson retired from managing the hotel in 1944, and his wife hired a professional manager. Upon her death in 1962, the hotel passed to Frank and Erma Sarver, and then to Soho Chun and Daisy Wing, who ran from 1967 to 1980. The hotel ceased operation in 1992.

The building was listed on the National Register of Historic Places on August 19, 1994.

When the building began to decline, the once elegant lobby was used by the local food bank as a storage and distribution center. At that time, the restaurant was called La Esquina.

On December 7, 2007, the front wall of the 1916 adobe addition partially collapsed, and continued to deteriorate over the next few months. The town of Superior declared a state of emergency and demolished and removed the adobe addition, leaving only the original 1912 concrete building and the brick addition from 1923. The ton foreclosed on the hotel in 2010, placing a lien of $164,000 against it, the cost of the town's demolition of the adobe addition.

Despite the terrible condition of the building's interior, which had been vandalized by transients, the Magma Hotel was purchased in 2010 by Chilean Miguel A. Sfeir's company Los Cedros Superior. Because of its historic status, the hotel had to be restored as well as renovated. More than 300 photographs were taken to help determine if this was possible.

The boutique "Historic Hotel Magma" which emerged from this process has 21 rooms – 6 in the original building and 15 in the brick addition, a restaurant which seats 40 people, a wrap-around veranda on the second floor – the old sleeping porch – and a tea room and bar with a tiny stage, 10 tables, and an ornate bar from the film John Wick Chapter 2. It also features a landscaped courtyard and a rooftop patio. The hotel opened to the public in 2019.

== In popular culture ==
The Magma Hotel was the site of filming for scenes in Oliver Stone's film U Turn. It also appeared in the fantasy action film The Prophecy II (1998).
