= Safford mine =

Open-pit copper mine in Graham County, Arizona

Coordinates: 32.9472°N 109.6509°W

The Safford Mine is an open-pit copper mine located in Graham County, Arizona, eight miles (13 km) north of the city of Safford. The mine is owned and operated by Freeport-McMoran Copper & Gold.

Construction on the Safford mine began in mid-2006. Production began December 26, 2007, with full production starting in 2008. It is the first new large-scale copper mining project in Arizona in more than 30 years. In September 2005, as part of the deal, Phelps Dodge (which was subsequently purchased by Freeport-McMoran) transferred 3,867 acres (15.65 km^{2}) of "environmentally sensitive" land to the Bureau of Land Management (BLM) and purchased from the BLM 16,297 acres (65.95 km^{2}) located next to the site of the mine.

The mine composes two porphyry copper deposits (the San Juan and Dos Pobres copper ore bodies) that have leachable oxide and secondary sulfide mineralization. Freeport-McMoran estimates that it will remove 205 to 240 million pounds of copper from the deposits annually between 2008 and 2011.

In 2016, copper production at Safford was 230 million pounds. In 2017, copper production was 150 million pounds, and approximately 830 people were employed there.

== Geography and facilities ==
The area where the mine is located is at an average elevation of 4,186 feet (1,276 m).

The mine is served by a branch of the Arizona Eastern Railway.

== See also ==
- Copper mining in Arizona
