= Superior Junior/Senior High School =

Coordinates: 33°16′39″N 111°06′42″W

Location
- 100 Panther Drive; Superior, Arizona 85173; United States

Information
- School type: Public high school
- School district: Superior Unified School District
- CEEB code: 030430
- NCES School ID: 040823000760
- Principal: William Duarte
- Teaching staff: 12.02 (on an FTE basis)
- Grades: 7–12
- Enrollment: 131 (2024–25)
- Student to teacher ratio: 10.90
- Colors: Black and orange
- Mascot: Panther
- Website: www.superiorusd.org/superior-jrsr-high

Superior Junior/Senior High School is a combined junior high and high school in Superior, Arizona, United States. It is operated by the Superior Unified School District, which also operates an elementary school, John F. Kennedy Elementary School. The superintendent of the district is Ericka Copeland.
