= Resolution Copper =

Joint venture for a copper mine in Arizona, US

Coordinates: 33°18′11″N 111°06′00″W

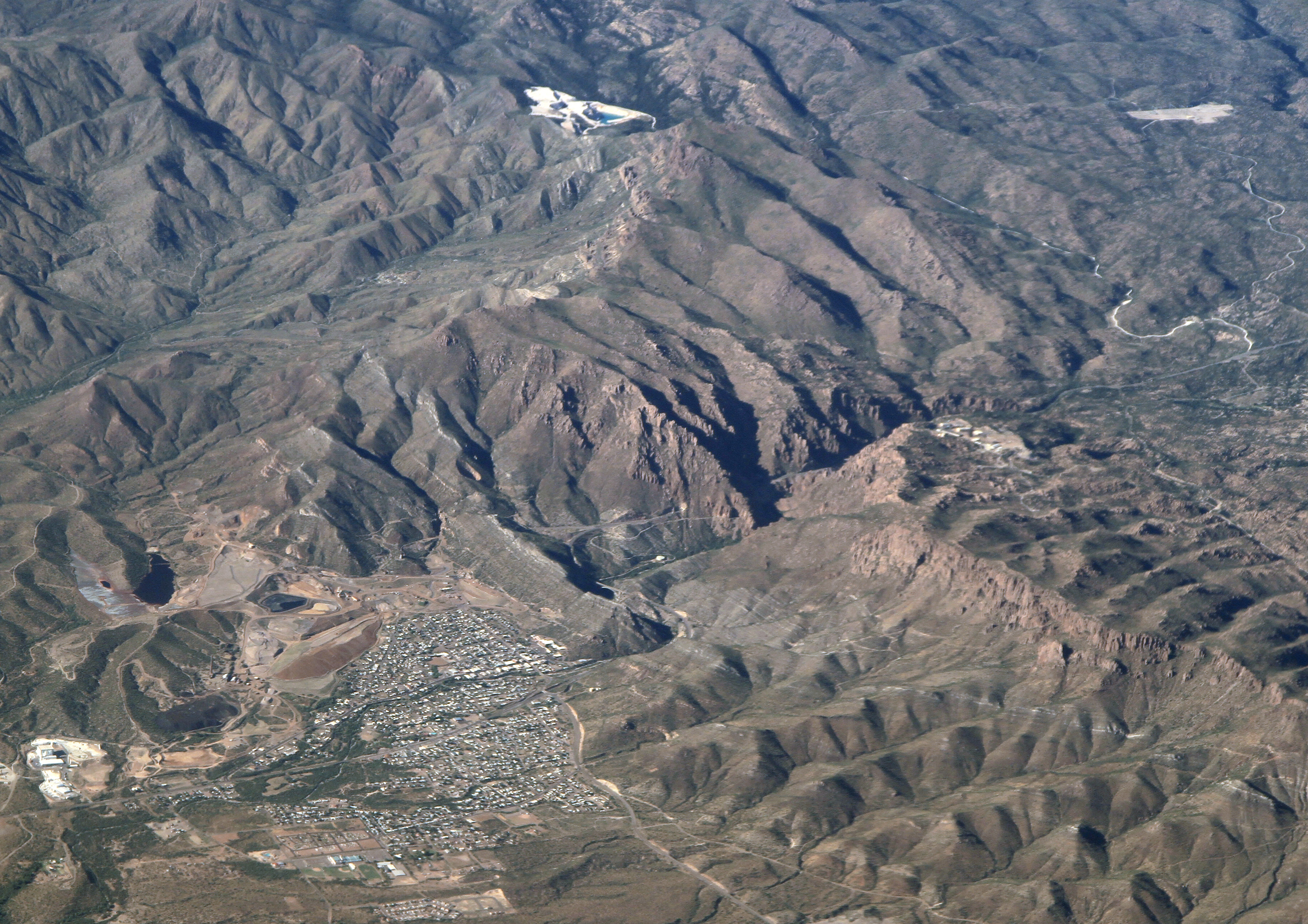
Aerial view of part of the Resolution Copper Project, the town of Superior and Queen Creek Canyon. US-60E goes up the Canyon (right), and the Resolution exploration shaft and facilities are at the canyon's south rim, at right center (white). Oak Flat campground is beyond the Resolution facilities.

Resolution Copper (RCM) is a joint venture owned by Rio Tinto and BHP formed to develop and operate an underground copper mine near Superior, Arizona, US. The project targets a deep-seated porphyry copper deposit located under the now inactive Magma Mine. Rio Tinto has reported an inferred resource of 1.624 billion tonnes containing 1.47 percent copper and 0.037 percent molybdenum at depths exceeding 1,300 metres (0.81 mi). It sits atop Oak Flat, a land preserve sacred to several Apache Native American tribes in the region. The proposed mine contains one of the largest copper reserves in North America. Following the passage of the 2015 National Defense Authorization Act, Native American and conservation groups opposed the copper mine.

== Overview ==
Resolution Copper estimates the $64 billion mining project would run over 60 years and produce 25% of projected future US copper demand for several decades.

=== Investment ===
Through 2012 Resolution Copper had invested almost a billion dollars in the Superior project, and planned a $6 billion investment to develop the mine, if the Federal land exchange is approved. Pending approval, the project budget was cut from about $200 million in 2012 to $50 million in 2013. By early 2023, more than $2 billion had been spent on exploratory work and preparation for the project.

Resolution Copper also owns the mineral rights acquired from ASARCO to the Superior East deposit which is another deep-seated porphyry copper deposit within a mile to the east.

== Project history ==
A proposed land swap with the federal government would give the federal government 5,376 acres (21.76 km^{2}) of environmentally sensitive land in Arizona in exchange for the 2,422-acre (9.80 km^{2}) oak flat federal parcel, which included the Oak Flat Campground (protected since 1955) and several outdoor climbing sites including the Mine, Atlantis and the Pond.

In May 2009, Arizona Democratic representative Ann Kirkpatrick introduced legislation in Congress to complete the land swap. The swap then had the support of Arizona's two Republican senators.

In 2013, the proposed land swap was readdressed when Rep. Paul A. Gosar (R, AZ-4) introduced the Southeast Arizona Land Exchange and Conservation Act of 2013 (H.R. 687; 113th Congress). The bill provided that the Apache Leap Cliffs, which rise prominently just east of the town of Superior, remain in federal ownership, and directed the Secretary of the Interior to manage Apache Leap so as to preserve its natural character. The bill required Resolution Copper to surrender any mining rights it has over the Apache Leap cliffs, and deeding 110 acres of private land in the area of cliffs to the federal government.

A rider introduced by John McCain and Jeff Flake in Section 3003 the 2015 National Defense Authorization Act, included the provisions of the stalled Southeast Arizona Land Exchange and Conservation Act. The Act cleared the way for the land swap in which Resolution would receive 2,422 acres of National Forest land in exchange for deeding to the federal government 5,344 acres of private land. The mine would impact an area set aside in 1955 by President Dwight D. Eisenhower which is sacred to the San Carlos Apache Indian Tribe. Both the Oak Flat Campground, an area dotted with petroglyphs and historic and prehistoric sites, and the steep cliffs at Apache Leap would be affected.

The initial report was published during the Donald Trump administration, and under the provisions of Section 3003 the transfer was scheduled to occur on March 11, 2021. The Joe Biden administration withdrew the report on March 2 to demand more input from the public and Indigenous nations. On March 18, 2021, Democrat Representative Raúl Grijalva reintroduced the Save Oak Flat Act for the fourth time, which would repeal the mandate to transfer the land transfer of Oak Flat to Resolution Copper.

In June 2022, the 9th US Circuit Court of Appeals, in a 58-page ruling, upheld a lower court ruling 2-1 in stating that the federal government had a right to make the land transfer. The two justices who voted in assent stressed that though they recognized the religious sensitivity of the land under discussion, the question was nonetheless one of what the federal government was allowed to do with it. In November, the court's 11 members agreed to hear the case en banc, with Rio continuing to seek an outside resolution with affected tribes. During a hearing of the body in March of 2023, representatives of the US Forest Service told the body that they did not believe that an 1852 treaty between the federal government and the Apache people represented a right by the Apache to the land under which the copper is found.

On March 1, 2024, the 9th Circuit Court, in a 6-5 ruling, issued a 253-page brief stating that the land transfer did not represent a "substantial burden" on the San Carlos Apache's religious rights because it did not reflect any requirement made by the government that members of the tribe stop worshipping their deities. Apache Stronghold, a group of Arizona's San Carlos Apache tribe members and conservationists, asked the US Supreme Court to overturn the Circuit Court's ruling.

On May 9, 2025, a federal judge blocked efforts by the Trump administration to transfer the land to Rio. In an 18-page order, District Judge Steven Logan stated that the Apache nation was likely to succeed in its appeal to the Supreme Court, and thus any transfer should be halted until the ruling was made.

On May 27, 2025, the US Supreme Court rejected an appeal by Apache Stronghold and left in place a lower court decision allowing the transfer of the Tonto National Forest land of Oak Flat to Resolution Copper.

The Resolution Copper land exchange was completed on March 16, 2026. This paved the way for further exploration and development by the joint venture.

== Project opposition ==
The San Carlos Apache Tribe, the National Audubon Society in Tucson, the Becket Fund for Religious Liberties, Grand Canyon Chapter of the Sierra Club as well as the National Congress of American Indians have opposed the Resolution Copper land swap. Native American groups and conservationists worry about the impact to surrounding areas. In 2014, Secretary of the Interior Sally Jewell said she was "profoundly disappointed with the Resolution Copper land-swap provision, which has no regard for lands considered sacred by nearby Indian tribes". Jodi Gillette, Special Assistant to the President for Native American Affairs, stated that the Obama administration would work with Resolution Copper's parent company Rio Tinto to determine how to work with the tribes to preserve their sacred areas. In 2021, the tribe filed a lawsuit against the land swap as a violation of the First Amendment, with other organizations following. Resolution Copper has made actions to provide benefit to the tribes, along with a grove preservation program in cooperation with the United States Forest Service and the Northern Arizona University. Resolution Copper has invested millions of dollars into Superior's town facilities and have offered employment and economic opportunities for the region. The controversy is called a "tug-of-war" by Associated Press.

== See also ==
- Peak copper
- Copper mining in Arizona
- Copper mining in the United States
- Magma Arizona Railroad
- Twin Metals mine
- Pebble Mine
- Oak Flat: A Fight for Sacred Land in the American West
