= Copper mining in Arizona =

- Position of Arizona

Location
- State: Arizona
- Country: United States

Regulatory authority
- Authority: Arizona Department of Mines and Mineral Resources
- Website: www.admmr.state.az.us

Production
- Commodity: Copper
- Production: ▲750,000 metric tons
- Value: ▼US $5.54 billion
- Employees: ▲10,300
- Year: 2007

In Arizona, copper mining has been a major industry since the 19th century. In 2007, Arizona was the leading copper-producing state in the country, producing 750 thousand metric tons of copper, valued at $5.54 billion. Arizona's copper production was 60% of the total for the United States. Copper mining also produces gold and silver as byproducts. Byproduct molybdenum from copper mining makes Arizona the nation's second-largest producer of that metal. Although copper mineralization was found by the earliest Spanish explorers of Arizona, the territory was remote, and copper could seldom be profitably mined and shipped. Early Spanish, Mexican, and American prospectors searched for gold and silver (see Silver mining in Arizona), and ignored copper. It was not until the completion of the Southern Pacific Railroad in 1876 that copper became broadly economic to mine and ship to market.

All copper mining was done by underground methods until the early 20th century. After the Bingham Canyon mine in Utah successfully mined a large low-grade copper deposit from a large open pit, the same technique was applied to Arizona's porphyry copper deposits. Arizona's first open pit copper mine opened at Ajo in 1917.

Copper-mining centers in Arizona

== Copper mining districts ==
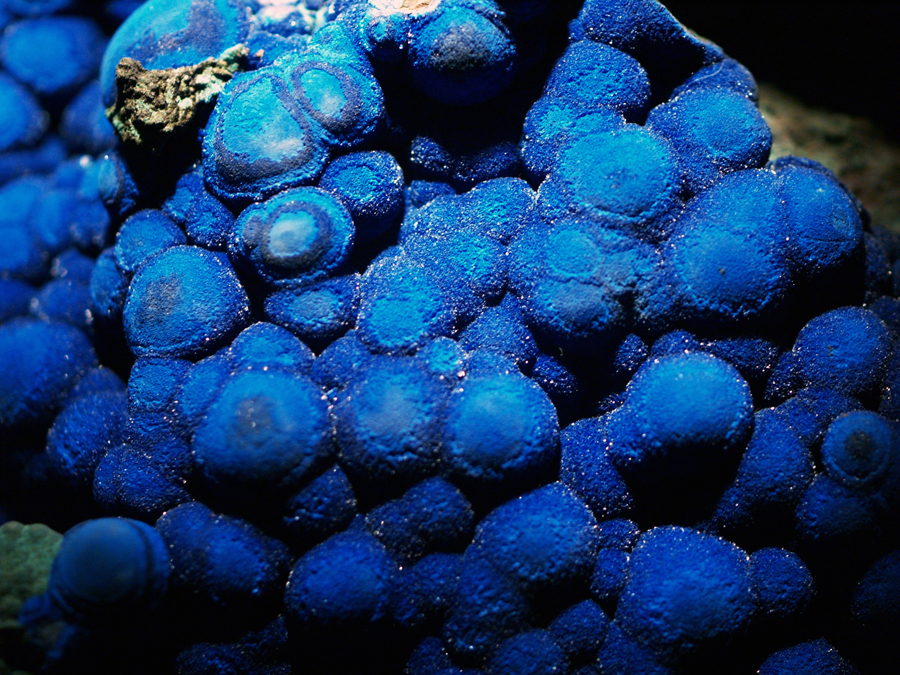
Azurite from Bisbee, Arizona

=== Jerome ===
Native Americans used copper minerals of the Verde district at modern-day Jerome as pigment to decorate skin and textiles. The first European to visit the area is thought to be Spanish explorer Antonio de Espejo, who found silver at a location in central Arizona in 1583. No mining resulted, and Juan de Oñate led another expedition searching for Espejo's silver location in 1598; many claims were staked, but the expeditioners returned to Santa Fe without mining any silver, and the deposits remained unexploited.

The United Verde mine exhausted the rich oxidized ores in 1884, and the mine closed. William A. Clark of Montana visited the district in 1888, bought it, and reopened the mine. The smelter at Clarkdale was built in 1915.

=== Ajo ===
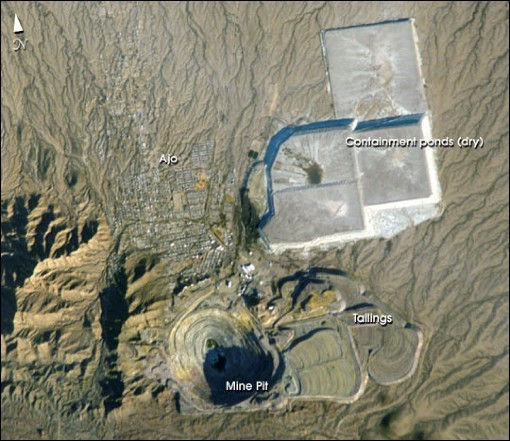
New Cornelia mine and the town of Ajo

Spaniards mined on a small scale at Ajo as early as 1750. After the Gadsden Purchase brought the southern Arizona into the United States in 1853, the mine was reopened in 1855, and shipped high-grade ore to Swansea in Wales. However, the remote desert location made mining generally uneconomic without onsite treatment. The area was mostly idle until the New Cornelia mine opened in 1917 as the first large open-pit mine in Arizona. Mining continued in the district until 1983. The district produced 6.304 billion pounds of copper.

=== Clifton-Morenci district ===
Prospectors from Silver City, New Mexico discovered copper mineralization at Morenci, also known as the Greenlee district in 1872. Mining began the following year, and miners extracted and smelted high-grade copper ore until a railroad reached the district in 1884 and a concentrator made mining and processing of low-grade ore economical.

The Morenci mine, owned jointly by Freeport-McMoran and Sumitomo, is the largest copper producer in the state, and regularly contributes about half of Arizona's copper production.

=== Bisbee (Warren district) ===
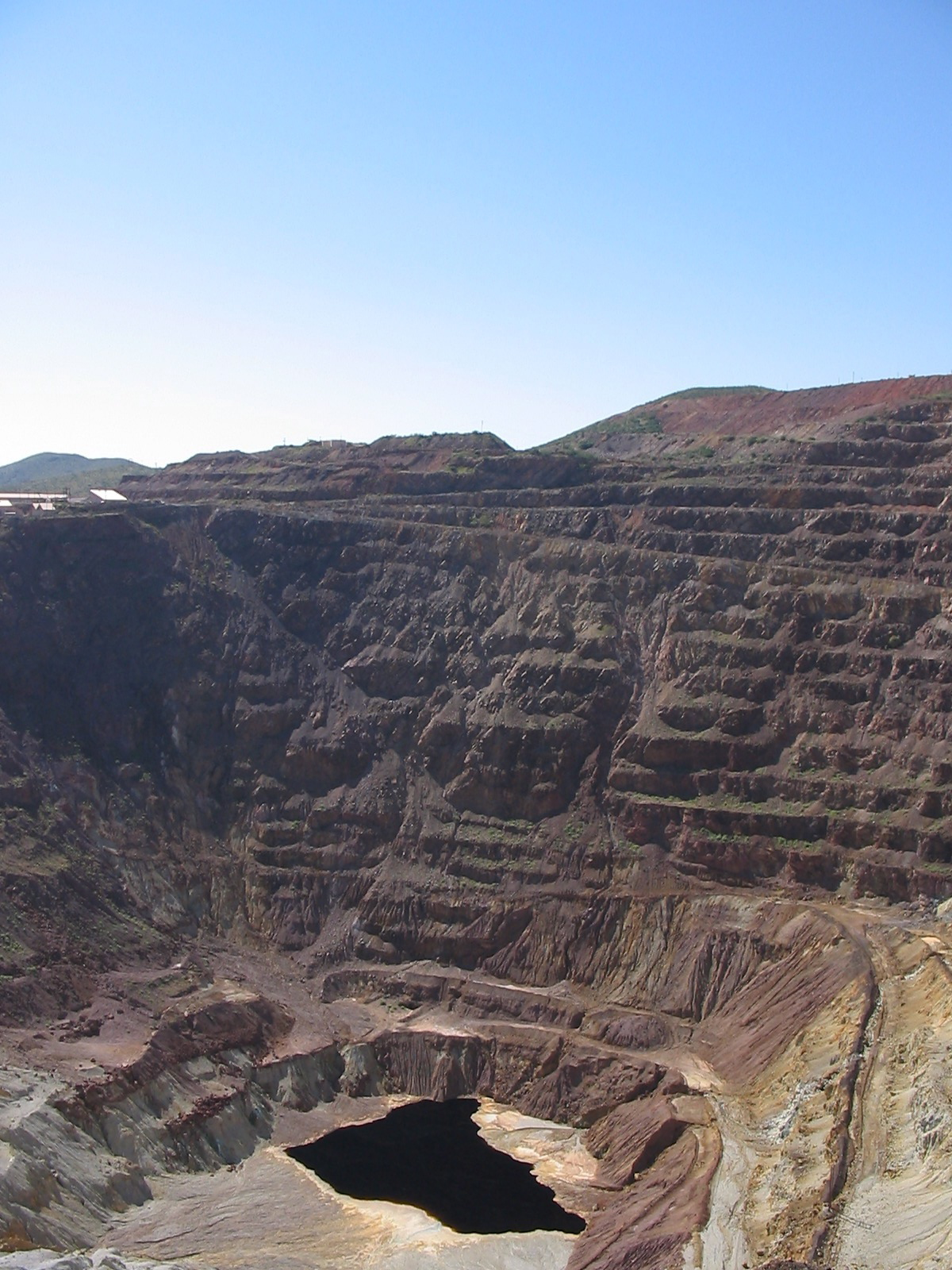
The Lavender Pit, Bisbee, Arizona

An army scout noted copper mineralization in the Warren district at present-day Bisbee in 1877. Production began in 1880 after a rich discovery of copper oxide on the Copper Queen claim. The success of the Copper Queen mine convinced Phelps Dodge to buy the adjacent Atlantic claim in 1881. Phelps Dodge later bought control of the Copper Queen and adjacent claims.

Although Phelps Dodge was the largest mining company in Bisbee, it was not the only one. The Calumet and Arizona Mining Company organized in March, 1901 and operated several large and profitable mines adjacent to the Copper Queen. By 1907, the C&A was the fourth-most productive copper mine in Arizona, and ran its own smelter in Douglas, Arizona.

Phelps Dodge started mining the Lavender open pit in the early 1950s. The Lavender pit closed in 1974.

The Copper Queen mine, Bisbee's first working mine, was also its last. Mining stopped in 1975, although the Copper Queen still offers tours.

The Warren district is credited with having produced 7.92 billion pounds (3.59 million mt) of copper. In addition, the district recovered 324 million pounds (147,000 t) of lead, 355 million pounds (161,000 t) of zinc, 28 million pounds (13,000 t) of manganese, 2.79 million ounces (86.8 t) of gold and 102 million ounces (3177 t) of silver.

=== Globe-Miami district ===
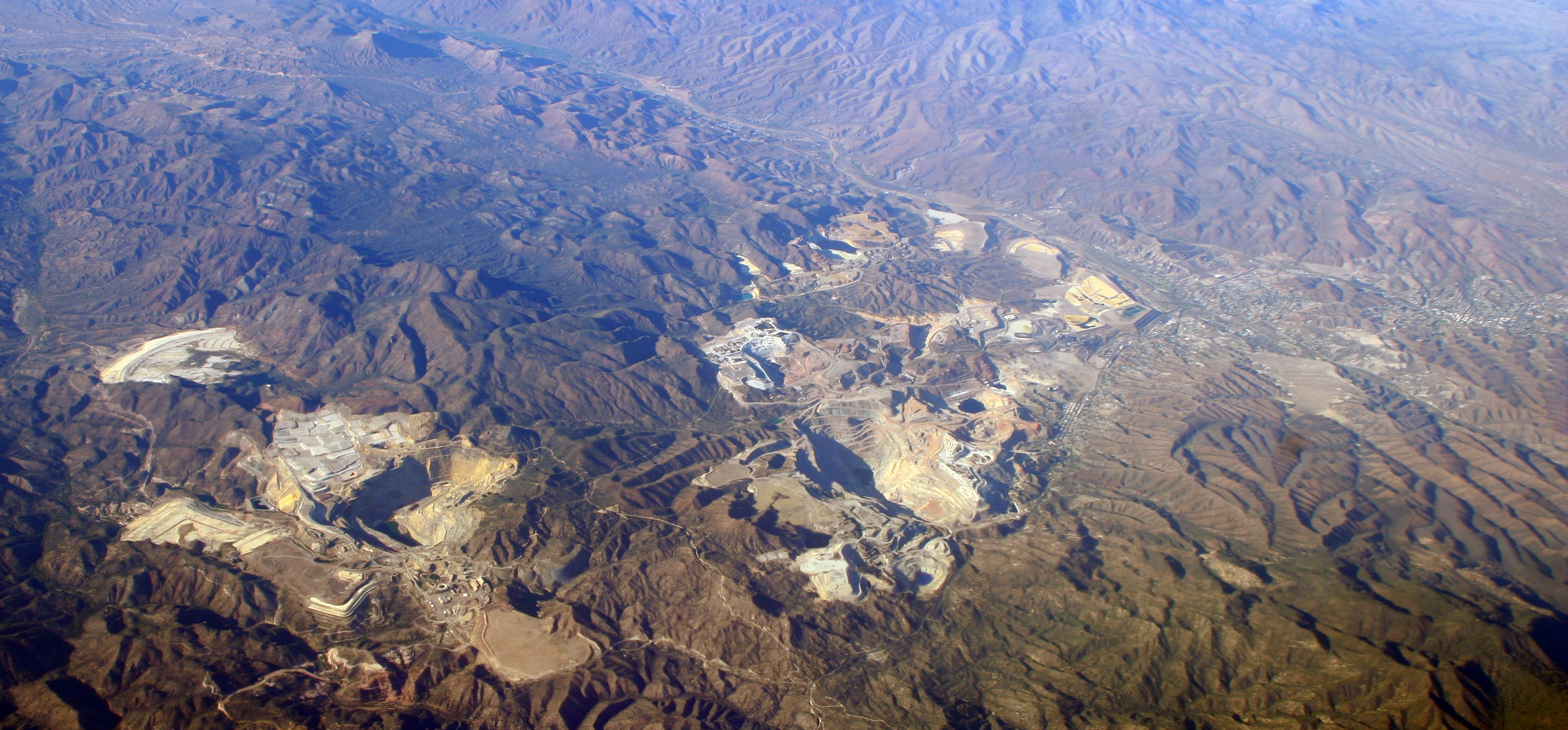
Panorama of Inspiration (FMCG) & Miami (BHP) operations, Miami-Inspiration Mining District, 2007

Silver mining started at Globe in 1874. The silver mines shut down in 1877, but the following year copper mining took over.

=== White Mesa district ===
The White Mesa copper-mining district is in the western part of the Navajo reservation, 112 miles (180 km) northeast of Flagstaff, in Coconino County. The copper deposits consist of malachite and chrysocolla as grain coatings in the Jurassic Navajo Sandstone. They were first mined on a small scale by Mormon settlers in the 19th century, then briefly in 1917, and again 1939–1941. The district produced about 550,000 pounds of copper and a small amount of silver.

== 21st-century mining ==
Significant active Arizona copper mines in 2012, by order of output:

Rank	Mine	County	Operator	Source of copper	2012 Cu Production (million lbs)	Reference
1	Morenci	Greenlee	Freeport-McMoRan	Copper-molybdenum ore, concentrated and leached	632	
2	Ray	Pinal	ASARCO	Copper ore, concentrated and leached	213	
3	Bagdad	Yavapai	Freeport-McMoRan	Copper-molybdenum ore, concentrated and leached	197	
4	Safford	Graham	Freeport-McMoRan	Copper ore, leached	175	
5	Sierrita	Pima	Freeport-McMoRan	Copper-molybdenum ore, concentrated and leached	157	
6	Mission Complex	Pima	ASARCO	Copper-molybdenum ore, concentrated	134	
7	Miami	Gila	Freeport-McMoRan	Copper ore, leached	66	
8	Silver Bell	Pima	ASARCO	Copper ore, leached	45.9	
9	Mineral Park	Mohave	Mercator Minerals	Copper-molybdenum ore, concentrated	40.9	
10	Carlota Mine	Gila	KGHM	Copper ore, leached	23.3	

Leading copper-producing mines in the Arizona in 2015, in order of output:

Rank	Mine	County	Operator	Source of copper	Capacity (thousands of metric tons)
1	Morenci	Greenlee	Freeport-McMoRan	Copper-molybdenum ore, concentrated and leached	480
2	Ray	Pinal	ASARCO	Copper ore, concentrated and leached	150
3	Mission Complex	Pima	ASARCO	Copper-molybdenum ore, concentrated	150
4	Safford	Graham	Freeport-McMoRan	Copper ore, leached	110
5	Bagdad	Yavapai	Freeport-McMoRan	Copper-molybdenum ore, concentrated and leached	100
6	Miami	Gila	Freeport-McMoRan	Copper ore, leached	90
7	Sierrita	Pima	Freeport-McMoRan	Copper-molybdenum ore, concentrated and leached	80
8	Pinto Valley	Gila	Capstone Copper	Copper-molybdenum ore, concentrated and leached	60
9	Silver Bell	Pima	ASARCO	Copper ore, leached	25
10	Carlota	Gila	KGHM International, Ltd.	Copper ore, leached	10

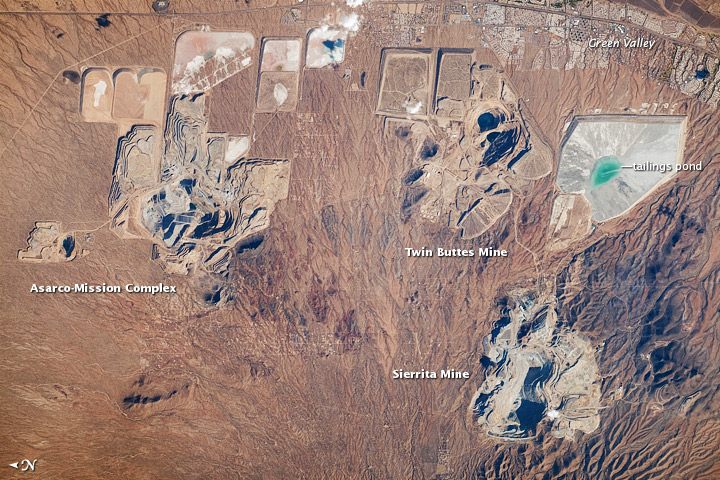
Open-pit copper mines south of Tucson. Note north is to the left. 2010 NASA astronaut photo.

Five of the mines are owned and operated by Freeport-McMoRan, three by ASARCO, and one each by Capstone Copper and KGHM International, Ltd.

Mining of the Resolution Copper deposit in Pinal County, potentially the largest copper mine in Arizona, is stalled pending a proposed land swap with the federal government. Resolution Copper has proposed to give the federal government 4,500 acres (18 km^{2}) of environmentally sensitive land in Arizona in exchange for the 3,000-acre (12 km^{2}) proposed mine site. In May 2009 Arizona Democratic congresswoman Ann Kirkpatrick introduced legislation in Washington to complete the land swap. The swap already has the support of Arizona's two Republican senators. As of July 2017, the project was still under review by the US Government.

The Sunnyside mine project is in development in Santa Cruz County.

== See also ==
- Copper mining in the United States
- Lists of copper mines in the United States
- Silver mining in Arizona
