= Sunnyside mine =

Copper exploration project in Arizona

Sunnyside copper project
- Location of Sunnyside project in Arizona, USA
- Location: Patagonia, Santa Cruz County, Arizona, United States; 31°27′35″N 110°34′38″W
- Company: Regal Resources Inc.
- Website: regalres.com/projects/sunnyside-patagonia/
- Acquired: 2010

The Sunnyside copper project is a copper exploration project located in Arizona's Patagonia Mountains in the southwestern United States. The property is located near Patagonia, Arizona, about 53 miles (85 km) south of Tucson in the Laramide porphyry copper province, and is owned by Canadian junior mineral exploration company Regal Resources Inc.

The Sunnyside system consists of deep chalcopyrite mineralization in ~60 to 59 Ma quartz-feldspar porphyry, and near-surface, slightly younger (~59–58 Ma) enargite-chalcocite-tennantite mineralization in quartz-feldspar porphyry, quartz monzonite porphyry, and Mesozoic rocks. Base metal skarn mineralization has been intersected in deep drill holes on the property.
