= Superior, Arizona =

Town in Pinal County, Arizona

Superior
- Town
- Superior, Arizona
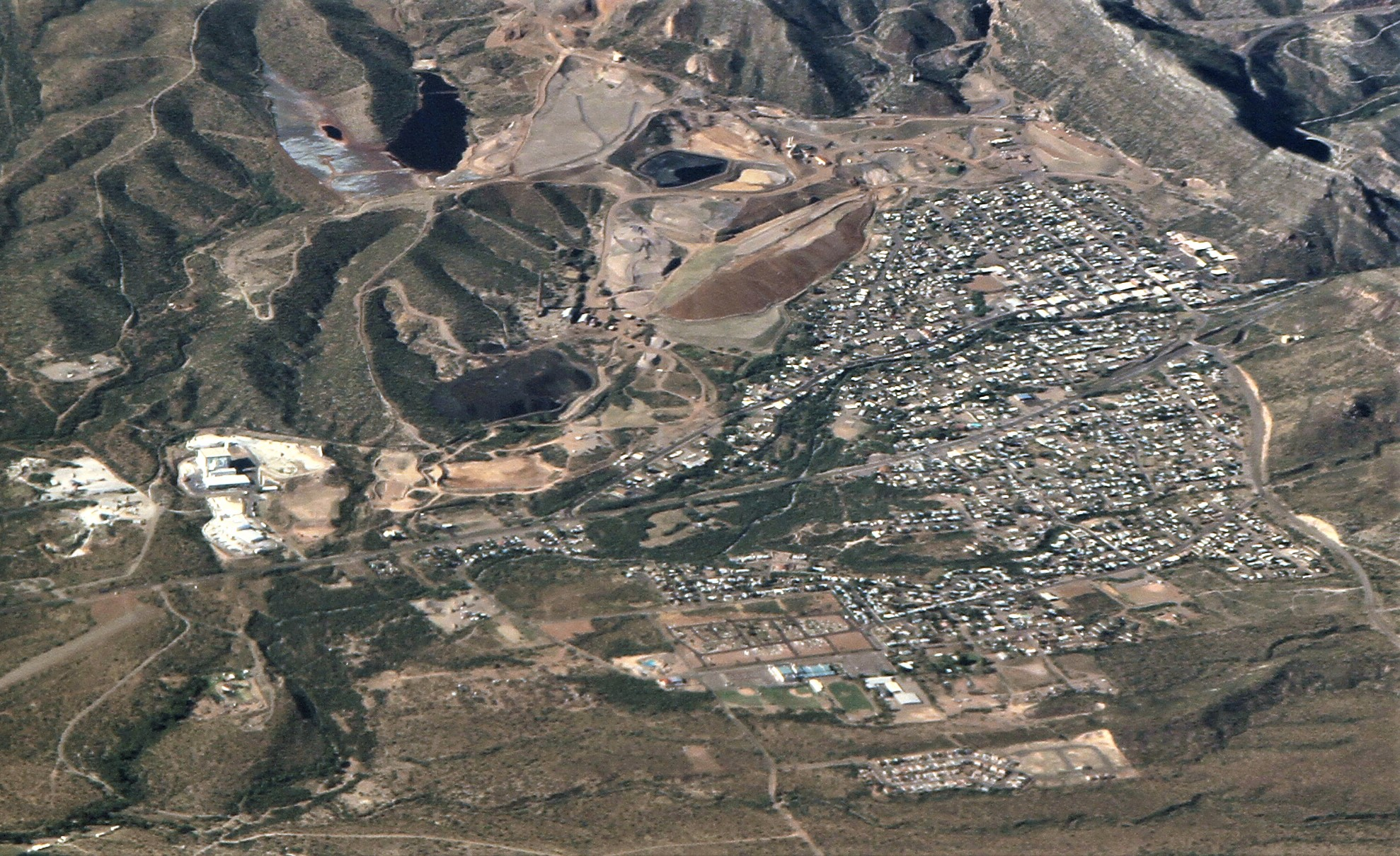
- Superior from the air, looking north (2009)

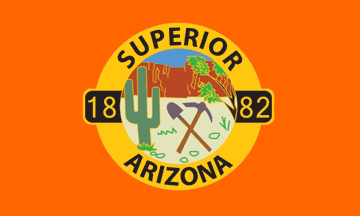
- Flag

- Location of Superior in Pinal County, Arizona.

- Location in the United States
- Coordinates: 33°17′20″N 111°6′14″W
- Country: United States
- State: Arizona
- County: Pinal
- Incorporated: 1976

Government
  - Type: Council-manager government
  - Mayor: Mila Besich-Lira.

Area
  - Total: 1.96 sq mi (5.08 km^{2})
  - Land: 1.96 sq mi (5.08 km^{2})
  - Water: 0 sq mi (0.00 km^{2})
- Elevation: 2,890 ft (880 m)

Population (2020)
  - Total: 2,407
  - Density: 1,226.3/sq mi (473.48/km^{2})
- Time zone: UTC-7 (MST (no DST))
- ZIP code: 85173
- Area code: 520
- FIPS code: 04-71300
- GNIS feature ID: 34981
- Website: www.superior-arizona.com

Superior (Western Apache: Yooʼ Łigai) is a town in northern Pinal County, Arizona, United States, and is the oldest town in the county. According to the 2020 census, the population of the town was 2,407. Superior was founded as a mining town for the Silver King and the later Magma mines; silver was mined at first, and then transitioned to copper. Currently, exploitation of the huge Resolution Copper deposit is being explored near the town.

== History ==
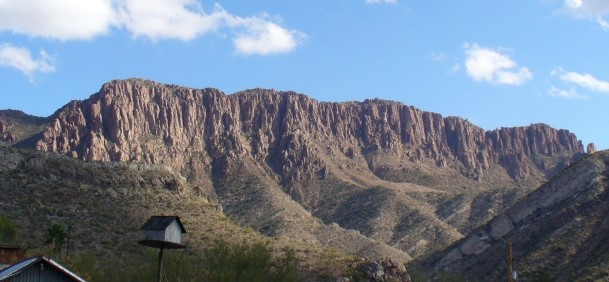
Apache Leap cliff

Like nearby Globe, Ray, and Clifton, Arizona, Superior was once part of a huge Apache reservation, but after silver and copper deposits were discovered, those areas were withdrawn from the reservation and returned to the public domain.

In 1872, at the height of the American Indian Wars, a band of raiding Apache horsemen were ambushed by a United States Cavalry force from Picket Post Mountain. After losing 50 men, the Apache retreated up the mountain later named "Apache Leap". According to local legend, in the face of defeat, the remaining Apache leapt to their death rather than being captured by the cavalry, thus giving the mountain its name.

Superior was originally called Queen, then Hastings, and under the latter name was platted in 1900.

Queen had a population of around 100 circa 1880. There was a general store, 2 hotels, numerous saloons, and a post office. The Queen post office closed September 15, 1881.

The Superior townsite was laid out in 1902, and named after the Lake Superior and Arizona Copper Company (LS&A). The Superior post office opened on December 29, 1902.

By 1950, before the United States Supreme Court's Brown v. Board of Education decision, schools in Superior segregated Anglo and Mexican students.

== Silver King Mine ==
The Silver King Mine began on March 22, 1875, when Charles G. Mason and four companions found native silver, and staked the Silver King claim. On March 29, 1875, the Silver Queen (Magma) vein was staked, and the Silver Queen Mining Company was organized in 1880. However, with the depletion of silver, the Silver Queen shut down in 1893, and the Silver King in 1896. In 1910, William Boyce Thompson and George Gunn bought the Silver Queen Mine, and organized the Magma Copper Company. A 300-ton-per-day concentrator was built in 1914. In 1915, a narrow-gauge railway connected Superior with the Southern Pacific Railroad, which was converted to standard gauge in 1923. A smelter was built in 1924.

After 71 years of production, the Magma Mine closed in August 1982 due to high operating costs and declining copper prices. Operations resumed in September 1990, but the mine closed again on June 28, 1996. During its 86-year life (1910–1996), the Magma produced about 27.6 million short tons of ore averaging about 4.9% copper, recovering about 1,300,000 short tons of copper, 36,550 short tons of zinc, 686,000 ounces of gold, and 34.3 million ounces of silver.

The old Magma No. 9 shaft atop Apache Leap is being used to explore the huge Resolution Copper deposit below.

== Geography ==
Superior is located approximately 70 miles (110 km) east of Phoenix and the same distance north of Tucson. According to the United States Census Bureau, the town has a total area of 1.9 sq mi (5.0 km^{2}), all land.

== Demographics ==
Historical population
Census	Pop.	Note	%±
1920	2,464		—
1930	4,295		74.3%
1960	4,875		—
1970	4,975		2.1%
1980	4,600		−7.5%
1990	3,468		−24.6%
2000	3,254		−6.2%
2010	2,837		−12.8%
2020	2,407		−15.2%
U.S. Decennial Census

=== 2020 census ===
As of the 2020 census, Superior had a population of 2,407. The median age was 50.4 years. 19.6% of residents were under the age of 18 and 29.2% of residents were 65 years of age or older. For every 100 females there were 92.7 males, and for every 100 females age 18 and over there were 92.2 males age 18 and over.

0.0% of residents lived in urban areas, while 100.0% lived in rural areas.

There were 1,043 households in Superior, of which 26.8% had children under the age of 18 living in them. Of all households, 34.5% were married-couple households, 23.7% were households with a male householder and no spouse or partner present, and 34.4% were households with a female householder and no spouse or partner present. About 33.0% of all households were made up of individuals and 19.8% had someone living alone who was 65 years of age or older.

There were 1,313 housing units, of which 20.6% were vacant. The homeowner vacancy rate was 3.8% and the rental vacancy rate was 9.9%.

Racial composition as of the 2020 census
Race	Number	Percent
White	1,197	49.7%
Black or African American	30	1.2%
American Indian and Alaska Native	54	2.2%
Asian	18	0.7%
Native Hawaiian and Other Pacific Islander	2	0.1%
Some other race	499	20.7%
Two or more races	607	25.2%
Hispanic or Latino (of any race)	1,639	68.1%

=== 2000 census ===
As of the census of 2000, there were 3,254 people, 1,237 households, and 847 families residing in the town. The population density was 1,685 inhabitants per square mile (651/km^{2}). There were 1,470 housing units at an average density of 761 per square mile (294/km^{2}). The racial makeup of the town was 72.7% White, 0.5% Black or African American, 1.6% Native American, 0.3% Asian, 0.1% Pacific Islander, 23.1% from other races, and 1.8% from two or more races. 69.1% of the population were Hispanic or Latino of any race.

There were 1,237 households, out of which 26.9% had children under the age of 18 living with them, 48.3% were married couples living together, 14.3% had a female householder with no husband present, and 31.5% were non-families. 27.4% of all households were made up of individuals, and 15.0% had someone living alone who was 65 years of age or older. The average household size was 2.63 and the average family size was 3.20.

In the town, the population was spread out, with 26.9% under the age of 18, 8.0% from 18 to 24, 21.7% from 25 to 44, 23.4% from 45 to 64, and 19.9% who were 65 years of age or older. The median age was 39 years. For every 100 females, there were 99.4 males. For every 100 females age 18 and over, there were 98.7 males.

The median income for a household in the town was $27,069, and the median income for a family was $31,250. Males had a median income of $34,297 versus $21,607 for females. The per capita income for the town was $12,490. About 22.5% of families and 27.8% of the population were below the poverty line, including 39.0% of those under age 18 and 16.5% of those age 65 or over.

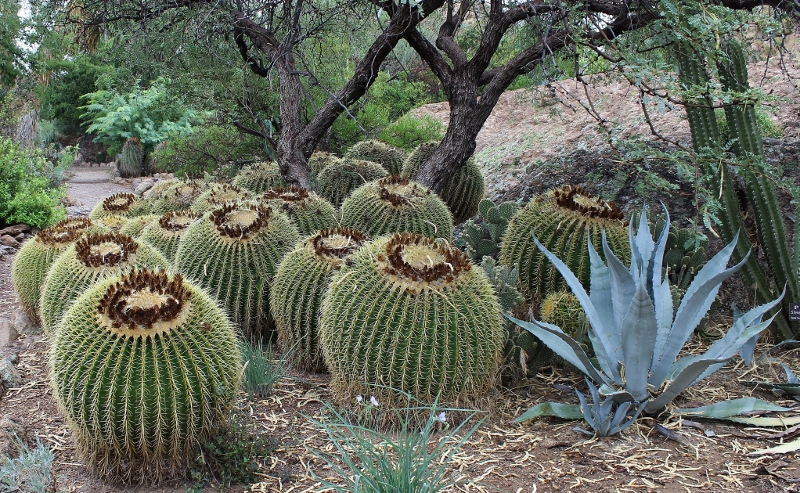
Boyce Thompson Arboretum, Cactus Garden

== Places of interest ==
The Boyce Thompson Arboretum is a 323-acre (1.31 km^{2}) botanical collection that includes a wide range of habitats and a 1.5-mile (2.4 km) walking trail. Founded in 1924, the arboretum is the largest and oldest botanical garden in Arizona.

== Climate ==
Superior has a hot semi-arid climate. In January, the average high temperature is 61 °F (16 °C) with a low of 43 °F (6 °C). In July, the average high temperature is 98 °F (37 °C) with a low of 76 °F (24 °C). Annual precipitation is just over 18 inches, but is higher at greater altitudes. Despite its relatively high precipitation due to favourable aspect, Superior is too low for significant snow even in winter.

Climate data for Superior, Arizona
Month	Jan	Feb	Mar	Apr	May	Jun	Jul	Aug	Sep	Oct	Nov	Dec	Year
Record high °F (°C)	81 (27)	87 (31)	91 (33)	96 (36)	105 (41)	111 (44)	112 (44)	110 (43)	106 (41)	102 (39)	89 (32)	83 (28)	112 (44)
Mean daily maximum °F (°C)	60.9 (16.1)	64.1 (17.8)	68.5 (20.3)	76.4 (24.7)	86.1 (30.1)	95.6 (35.3)	97.7 (36.5)	95.4 (35.2)	92.3 (33.5)	82.5 (28.1)	69.8 (21.0)	61.6 (16.4)	79.2 (26.2)
Mean daily minimum °F (°C)	43.2 (6.2)	45.4 (7.4)	48.2 (9.0)	54.4 (12.4)	62.7 (17.1)	72.0 (22.2)	75.7 (24.3)	74.2 (23.4)	71.2 (21.8)	62.0 (16.7)	51.1 (10.6)	44.0 (6.7)	58.7 (14.8)
Record low °F (°C)	20 (−7)	20 (−7)	24 (−4)	29 (−2)	38 (3)	51 (11)	59 (15)	61 (16)	50 (10)	33 (1)	29 (−2)	19 (−7)	19 (−7)
Average rainfall inches (mm)	2.00 (51)	1.98 (50)	2.02 (51)	.80 (20)	.34 (8.6)	.26 (6.6)	1.91 (49)	2.80 (71)	1.48 (38)	1.18 (30)	1.41 (36)	2.11 (54)	18.29 (465.2)
Average rainy days (≥ 0.01 inch)	5	5	5	3	2	1	7	8	4	3	4	5	52
Source: Western Regional Climate Center

== Transportation ==
Greyhound Lines serves Superior on its Phoenix–El Paso via Globe route.

== Education ==
It is in the Superior Unified School District. The district houses John F. Kennedy Elementary School and Superior Junior/Senior High School, a combined junior high and high school.

== In popular culture ==
Such films as U Turn by Oliver Stone, Eight Legged Freaks, How the West Was Won, Blind Justice, The Prophecy, Skinwalkers, The Gauntlet with Clint Eastwood, and Young Billy Young are set in Superior. In 2005, a sci-fi film named The Salena Incident, also called Alien Invasion Arizona, was filmed in Superior.

== Gallery ==
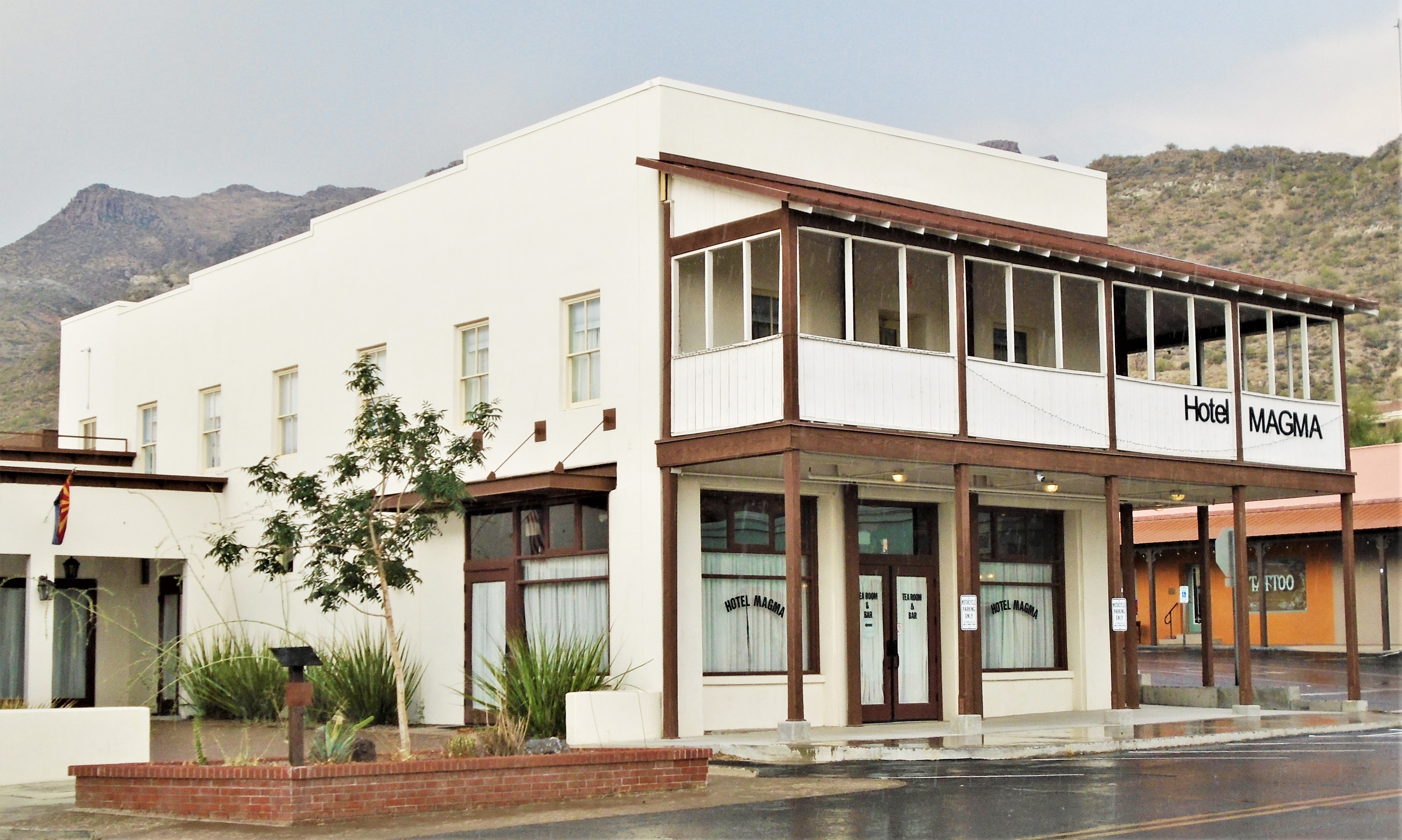
The renovated and restored Hotel Magma

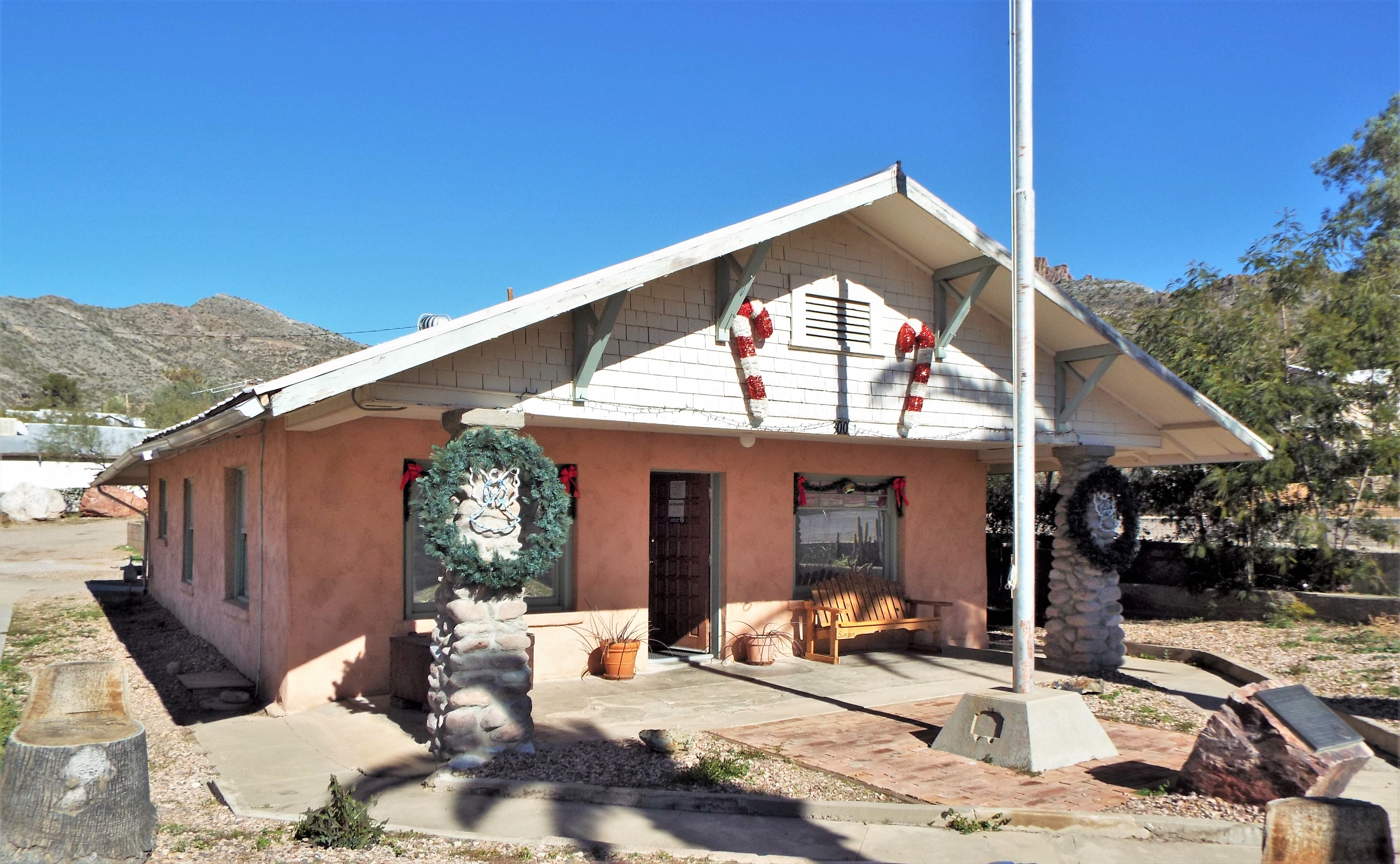
The Bob Jones House, home of Robert Taylor Jones, who became Arizona's sixth governor.

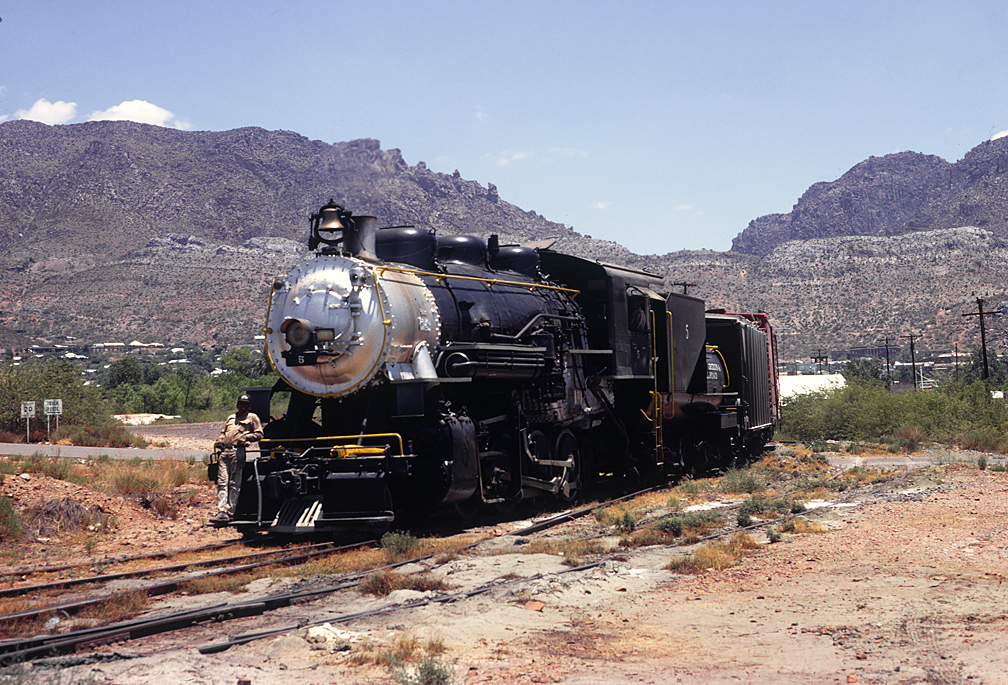
Magma Arizona Railroad in Superior (1967)

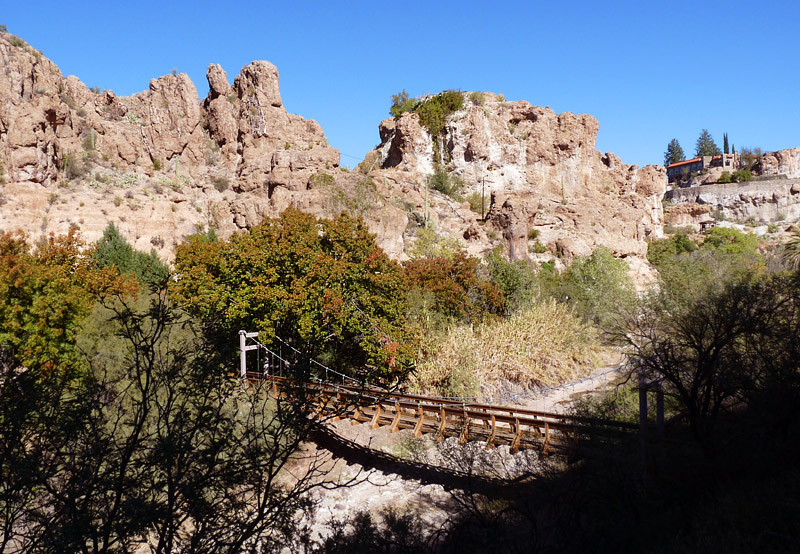
The riparian (river-associated) area of the Boyce Thompson Arboretum. The Boyce Thompson mansion can be seen at the right.

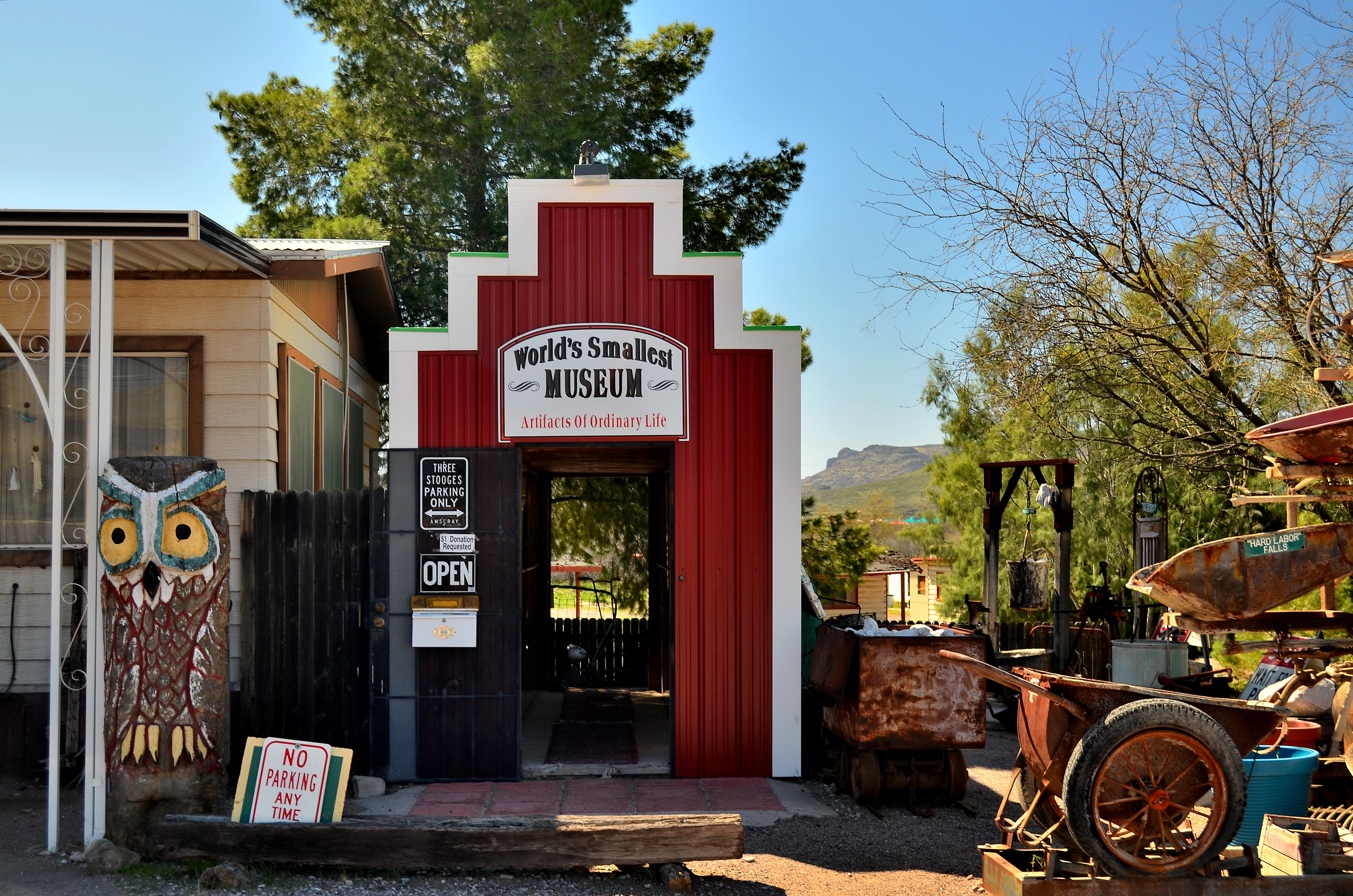
World's Smallest Museum

== See also ==
- Resolution Copper
- List of historic properties in Superior, Arizona
