= List of places in Arizona (Q–R) =

This is a list of cities, towns, unincorporated communities, counties, and other places in the U.S. state of Arizona, which start with the letters Q and R. This list is derived from the Geographic Names Information System, which has numerous errors, so it also includes many ghost towns and historical places that are not necessarily communities or actual populated places. This list also includes information on the number and names of counties in which the place lies, its lower and upper ZIP code bounds, if applicable, its U.S. Geological Survey (USGS) reference number(s) (called the GNIS), class as designated by the USGS, and incorporated community located in (if applicable).

== Q ==
Name of place	Number of counties	Principal county	GNIS #(s)	Class	Located in	ZIP code	
Name of place	Number of counties	Principal county	GNIS #(s)	Class	Located in	Lower	Upper
Quartzsite	1	La Paz	2412516	Civil (town)		85346	
Queen Creek	2	Maricopa	2412518	Civil (town)		85242	
Queen Valley	1	Pinal	2409115	CDP		85219	
Queens Well	1	Apache	24193	Populated Place			
Quijotoa	1	Pima	24572	Populated Place			
Quitobaquito	1	Pima	23947	Populated Place			
Quivero	1	Coconino	33295	Populated Place	Valle		

== R ==
Name of place	Number of counties	Principal county	GNIS #(s)	Class	Located in	ZIP code	
Name of place	Number of counties	Principal county	GNIS #(s)	Class	Located in	Lower	Upper
Rainbow City	1	Navajo	2582847	CDP			
Rainbow Valley	1	Maricopa	25035	Populated Place	Goodyear	85326	
Ramsey	1	Cochise	33353	Populated Place			
Rancho Mesa Verde	1	Yuma	2582848	CDP			
Randolph	1	Pinal	9954	Populated Place		85222	
Rare Metals	1	Coconino		Populated Place		86045	
Ray	1	Pinal	33415	Populated Place			
Ray Junction	1	Pinal	24576	Populated Place			
Redington	1	Pima	10181	Populated Place		85602	
Red Lake	1	Apache	44815	Populated Place	Tonalea		
Red Mesa	1	Apache	2409150	CDP		86514	
Red Rock	1	Apache	2582849	CDP		87461	
Red Rock	1	Pinal	2582850	CDP		85245	
Red Rock	1	Yavapai	33497	Populated Place			
Reymert	1	Pinal	33589	Populated Place			
Richville	1	Apache	25271	Populated Place		85936	
Rillito	1	Pima	2582851	CDP		85654	
Rimrock	1	Yavapai	33627	Populated Place		86335	
Rincon	1	Pima	24582	Populated Place		85710	
Rincon Valley	1	Pima	2582852	CDP		85730	
Riordan	1	Coconino	42729	Populated Place			
Rio Rico	1	Santa Cruz	2629190	CDP		85648	
Rio Verde	1	Maricopa	2409181	CDP		85263	
Riverside	1	Pinal	10330	Populated Place			
Riviera	1	Mohave	25309	Populated Place	Bullhead City	86442	
Robles Junction	1	Pima	24585	Populated Place	Three Points		
Rock House	1	Gila	2582853	CDP			
Rockledge	1	Coconino	33758	Populated Place			
Rock Point	1	Apache	2409193	CDP		86545	
Rock Springs	1	Yavapai	24586	Populated Place	Black Canyon City	85324	
Roll	1	Yuma	10481	Populated Place		85347	
Roosevelt	1	Gila	2582854	CDP		85545	
Rosemont Camp	1	Pima	37495	Populated Place			
Rough Rock	1	Apache	2409215	CDP		86503	
Round Rock	1	Apache	2409217	CDP		86547	
Round Valley	1	Gila	2582855	CDP			
Roundy Crossing	1	Navajo	33848	Populated Place			
Rowood	1	Pima	24591	Populated Place			
Ruby	1	Santa Cruz	33856	Populated Place			
Rye	1	Gila	2582856	CDP		85541	
