= Historic Pinal Cemetery =

Cemetery in Arizona

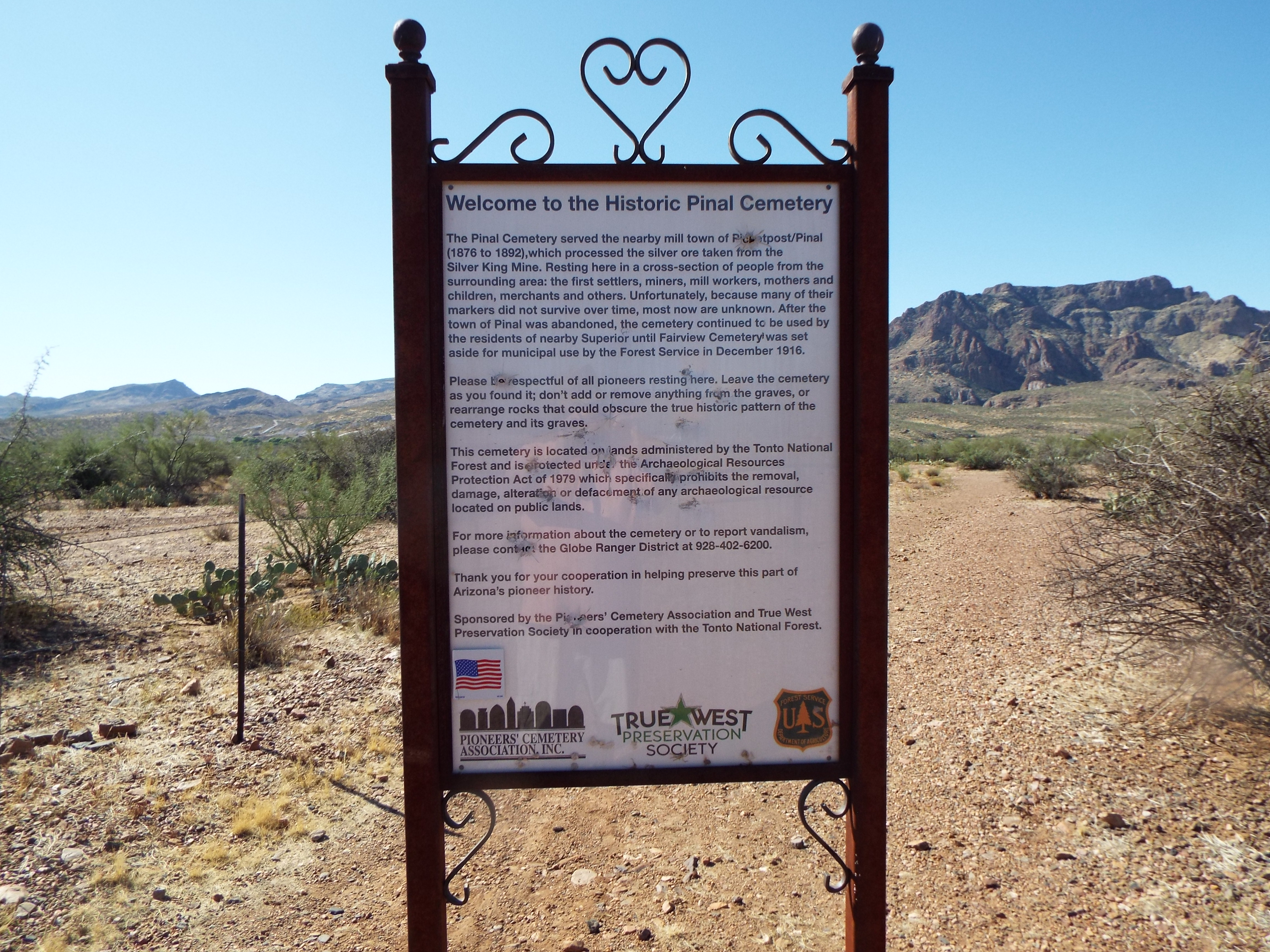
- Pinal Cemetery aka, Historic Pinal Cemetery
- Interactive map of Historic Pinal Cemetery

Details
- Established: 1876
- Location: Off US 60 on a hill near the town of Superior, Arizona, on the unmarked East Happy Camp Road
- Country: U.S.
- Coordinates: 33°19′49″N 111°5′19″W
- Owned by: Administered by the Tonto National Forest
- No. of graves: 43 identified
- Find a Grave: Historic Pinal Cemetery

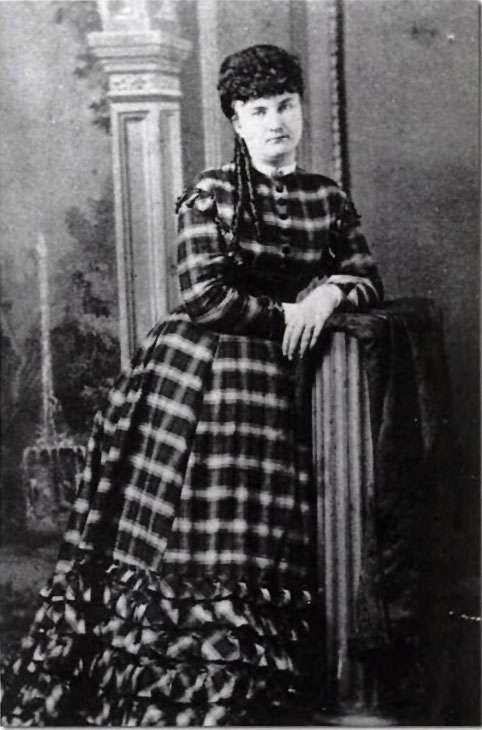
Celia Earp

The Historic Pinal Cemetery, first known simply as "Pinal Cemetery", is a cemetery located on a hill in what once within the jurisdiction of the now ghost town of Pinal City, Arizona. The Pioneers' Cemetery Association (PCA) defines a "historic cemetery" as one which has been in existence for more than fifty years. In 2009, the Tonto National Forest made it its goal to develop and manage the cemetery as an interpretive site while preserving its historic context and integrity as an archaeological resource. Among those who are buried in the cemetery is Celia Ann “Mattie” Blaylock Earp who was Wyatt Earp's common law wife. The role of Mattie Earp was played by actress Dana Wheeler-Nicholson in the 1993 American Western film Tombstone.

== History ==
Silver was discovered about 1 mile west of Kings Crown Peak in the fall of 1874 and initially worked until March 24, 1875. The mine which became known as the Silver King Mine was located about 3 miles north of Superior. A direct result of this discovery was the establishment in 1878, of Pinal City which quickly became a "Boom Town" of about two thousand residents. General George Stoneman established a military post by the base of the mountain close to Pinal City to protect the residents and the workers of the Silver King Mine from the attacks of the Apaches. The post was named Picket Post and thus, the mountain in question became known as the Picket Post Mountain. The ores were initially crushed on-site by a Blake crusher and then transported by wagon trains whose ore carts were pulled by many mules to Pinal City. The tracks made by the wagon trains on the soft volcanic trail are still visible.

The Pinal Cemetery was established in 1878. The historic cemetery is now within the jurisdiction of the Tonto National Forest in Pinal County since it is located in on lands administered by that agency. It is protected under the Archaeological Resources Protection Act of 1979. Interred in the cemetery are the area's first settlers, miners, mill workers, mothers and children, merchants and others. When the mine dried out, the economic situation in Pinal City worsened. The Pinal post office was closed on November 28, 1891. The town was deserted shortly thereafter and is now considered a ghost town. The residents of Superior continued to use the cemetery until 1916, the year that the Fairview Cemetery was established. Among the improvements made in 2009, to the cemetery, after it became known that Wyatt Earp's second “wife,” was interred there, was the addition of a fence and signage with the added phrase "Historical".

Noteworthy graves include:

- Celia Ann “Mattie” Blaylock Earp (1850–1888) – Mattie was Wyatt Earp's common law wife. Wyatt abandoned her and she ended up living in Pinal City. However, she was unable to make a living and on July 3, 1888, she took a lethal dose of laudanum and alcohol. Her death was ruled as "suicide by opium poisoning".
- Manuelita Guzman (1844–1916) – Guzman was the matriarch of the Guzman family who have spanned over six generations in Superior.
- Annie Maria Weston – She was the wife of J. E. Weston. Her husband was a prospector who managed the Radium Company of Colorado before coming to Arizona.

== Gallery ==
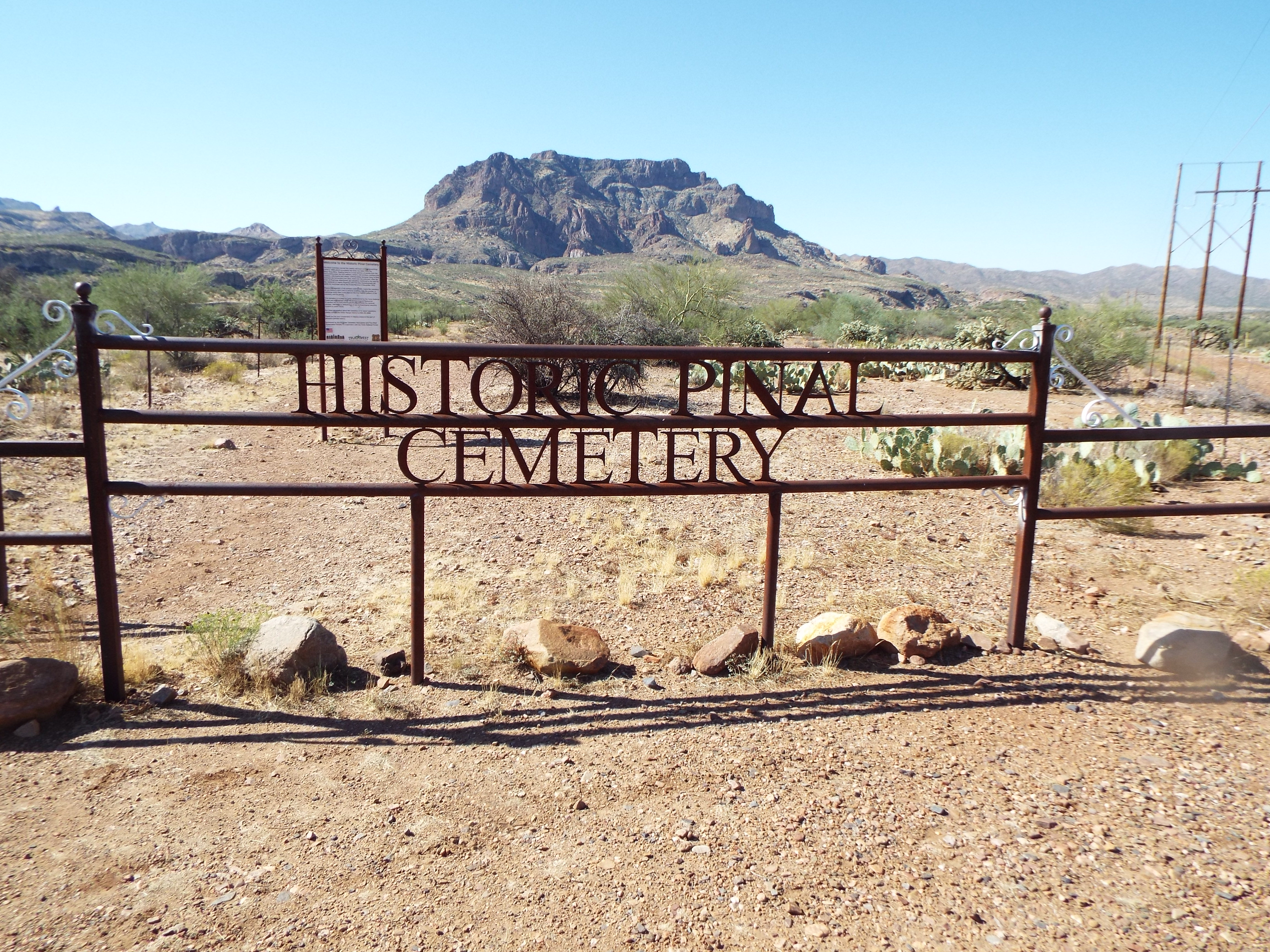
Historic Pinal Cemetery

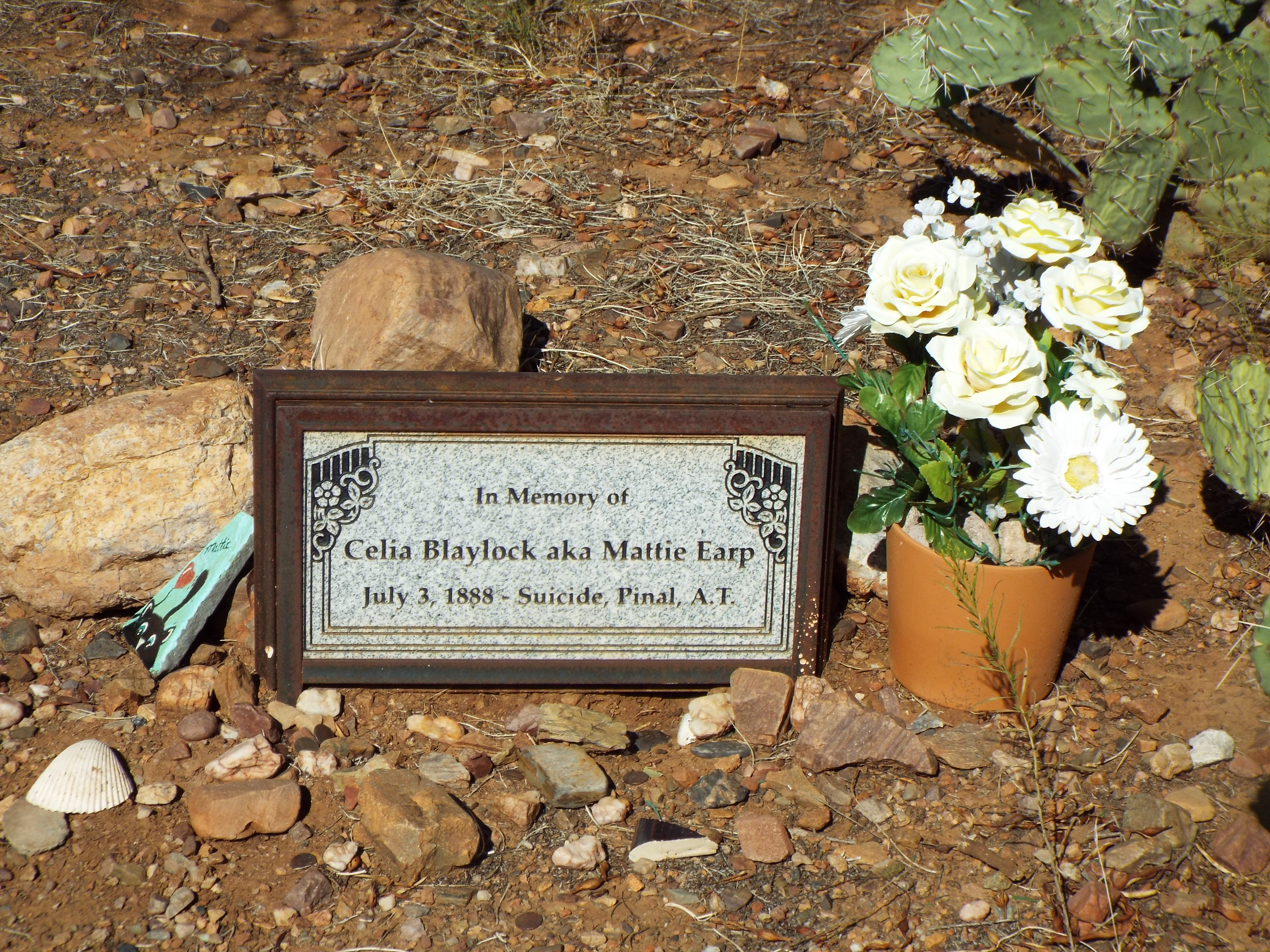
Grave-site of Ceilia Ann "Mattie" Blaylock Earp

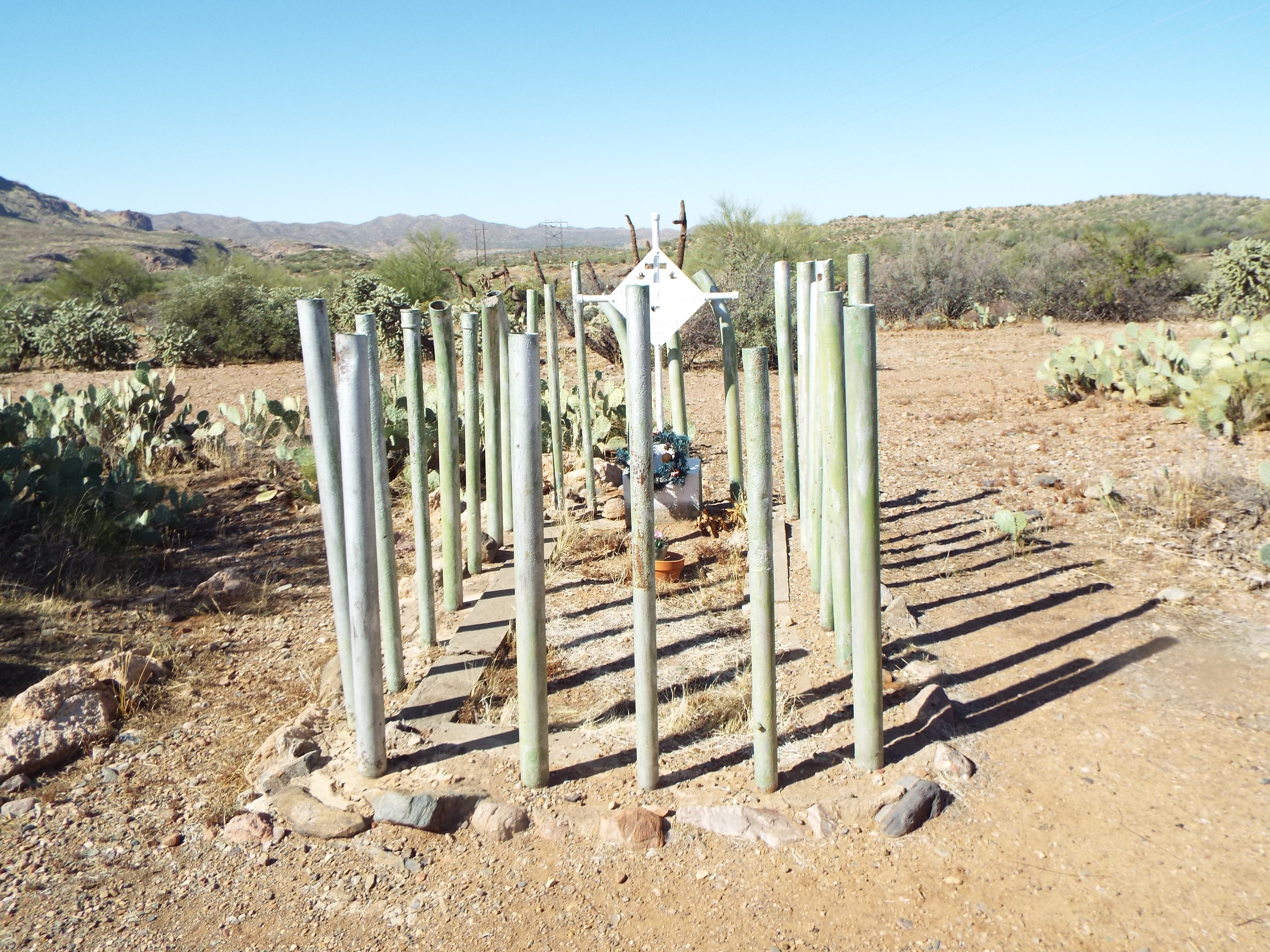
Grave-site of Manuelita Guzman

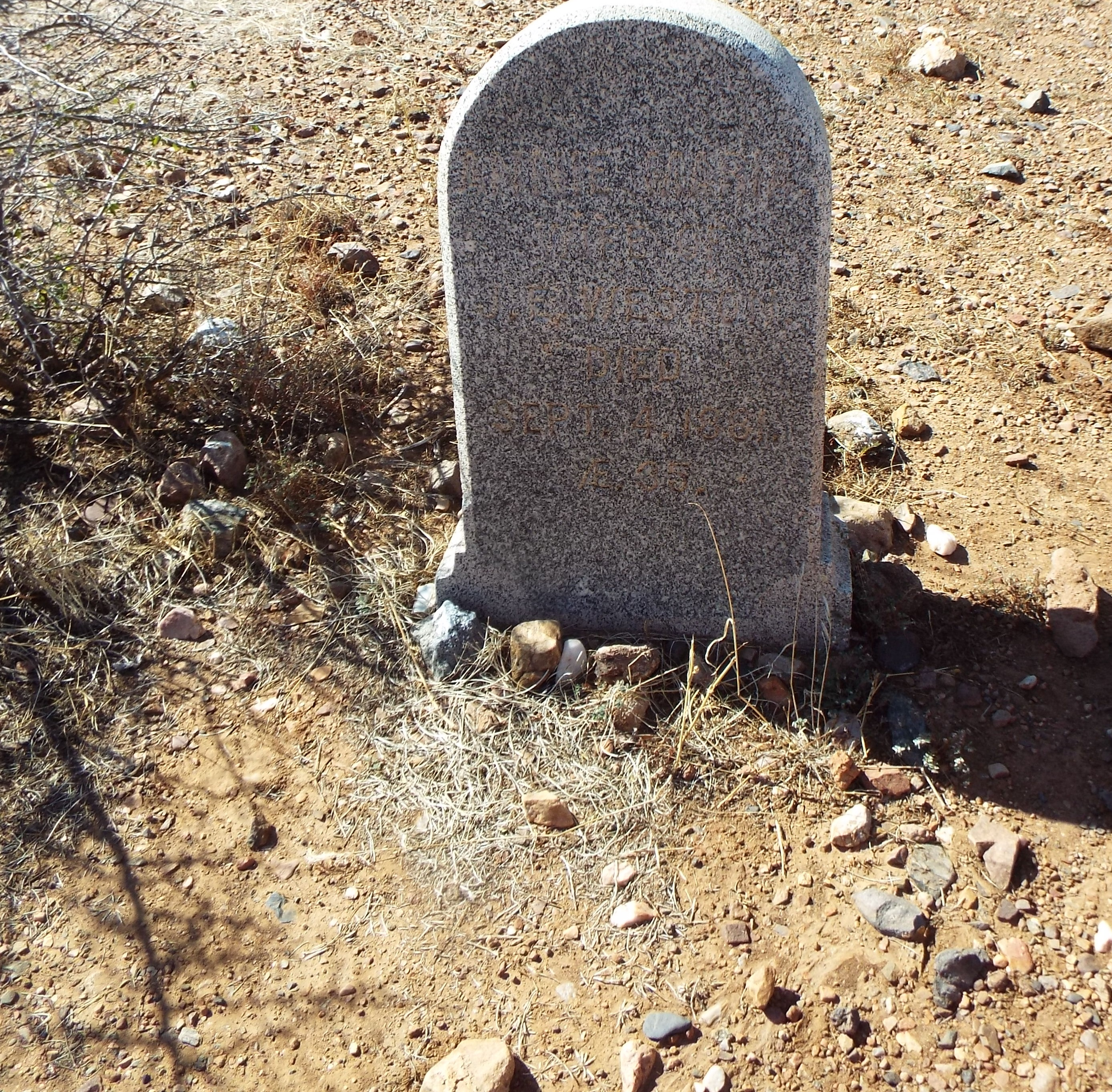
Grave-site of Annie Marie Weston

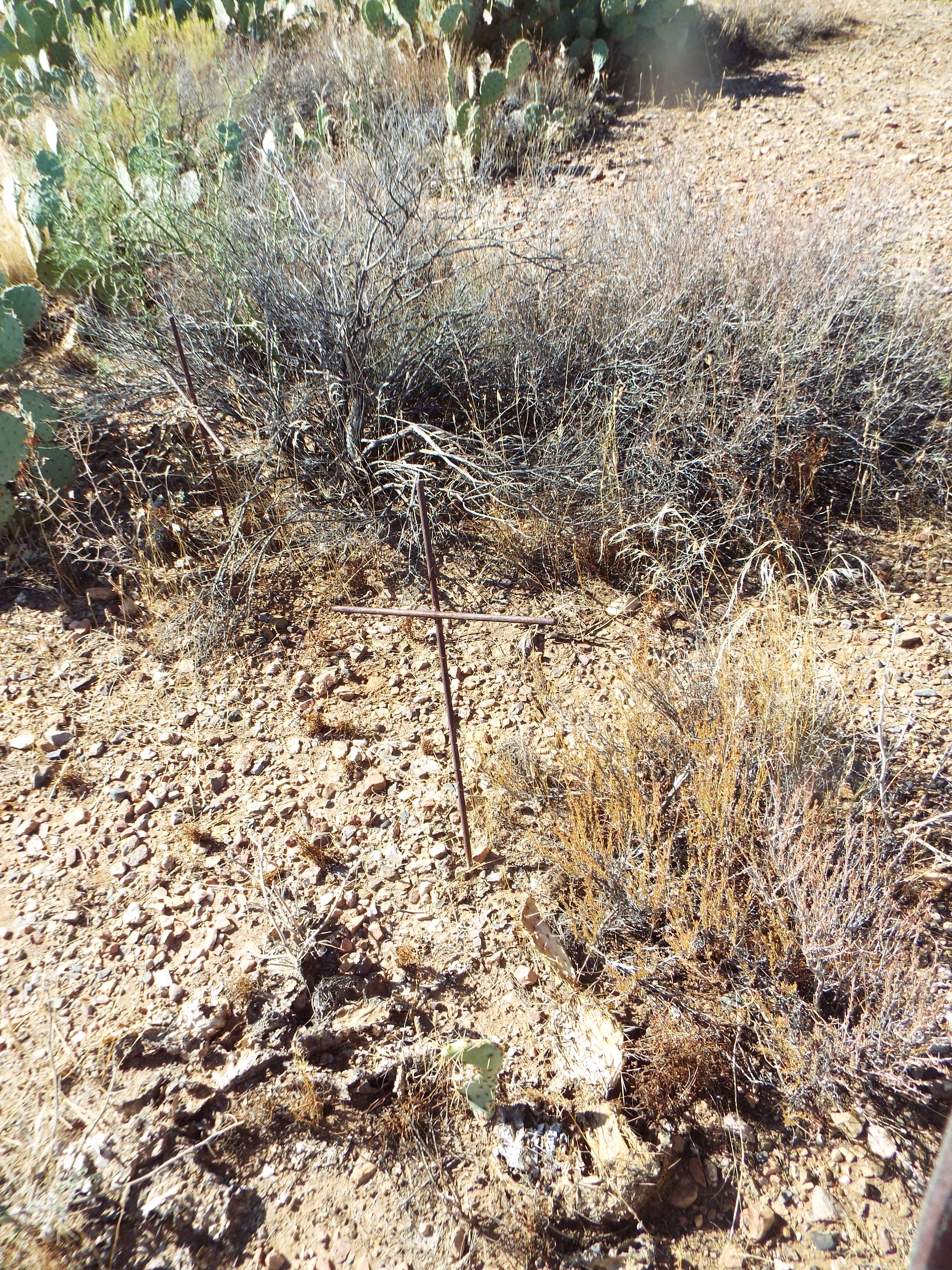
Unknown grave #1

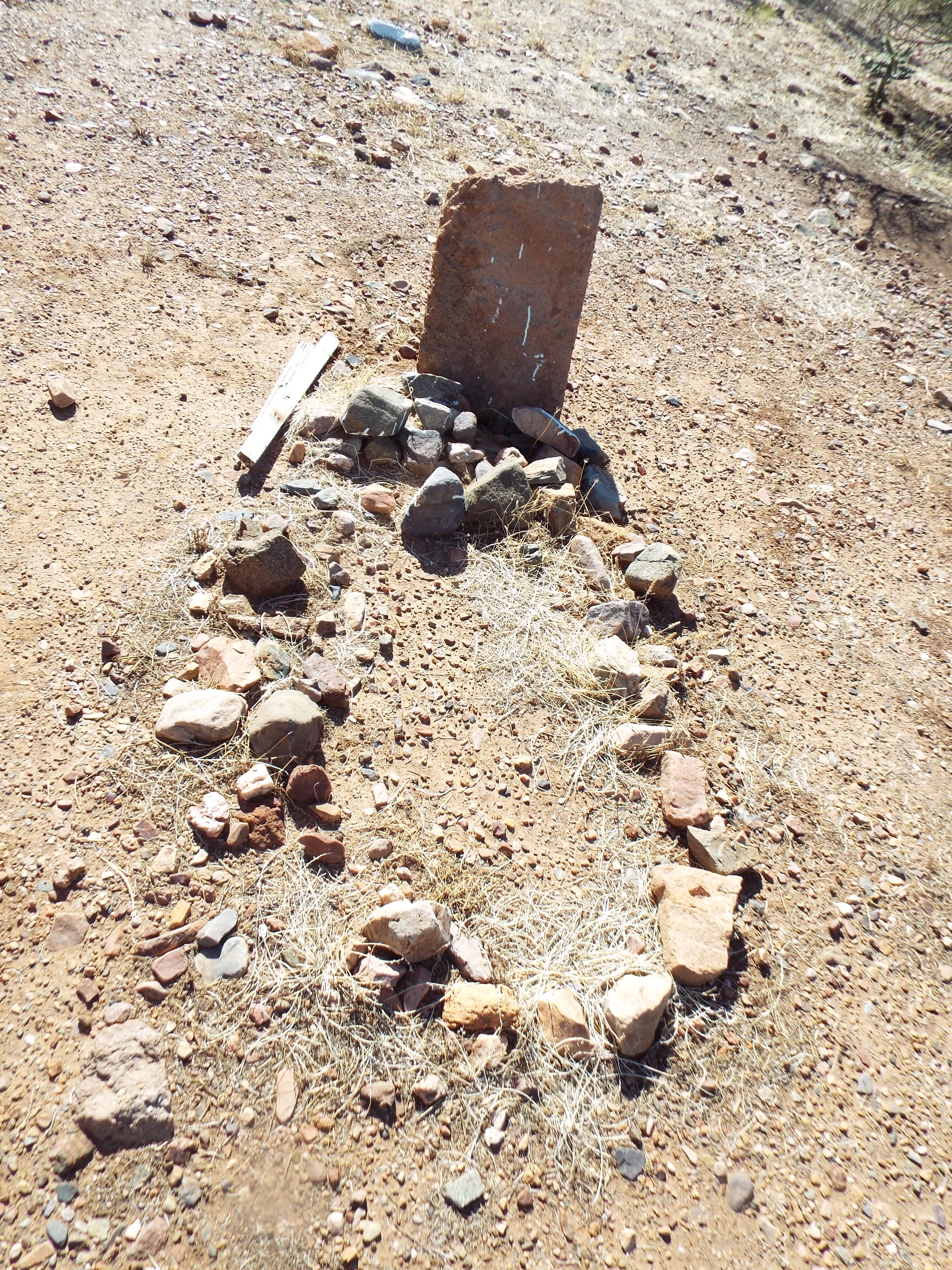
Unknown grave #3

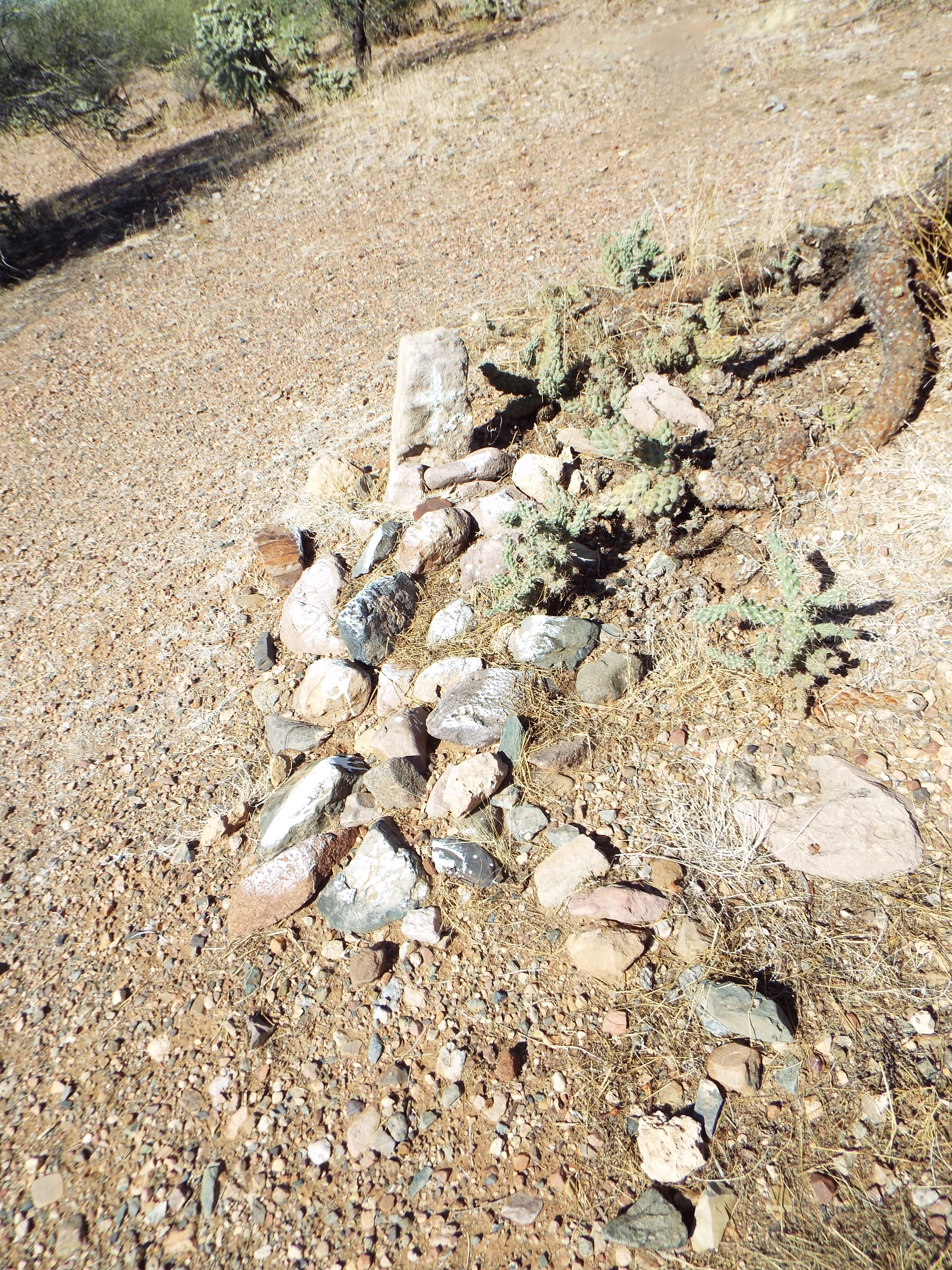
Unknown grave #4

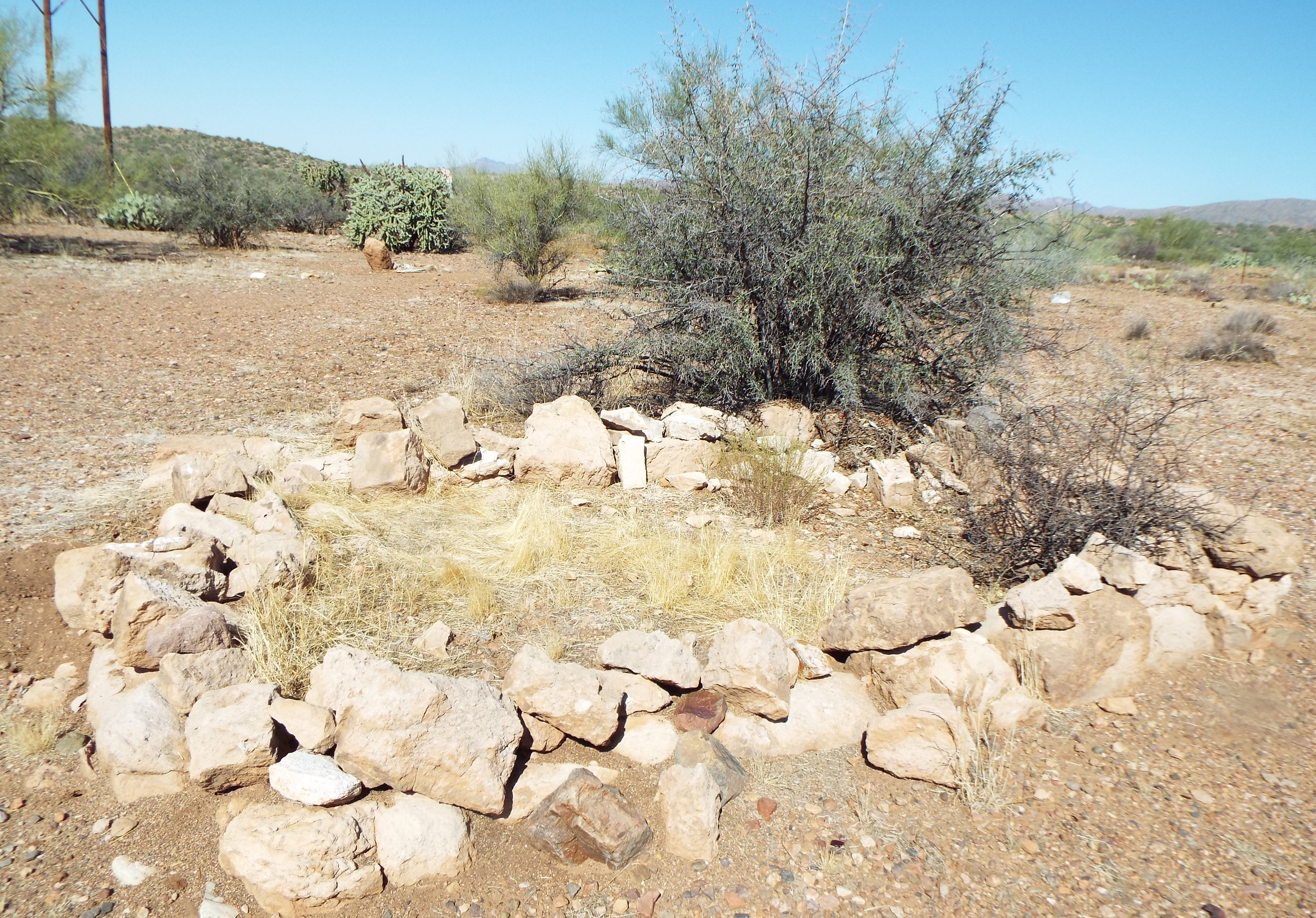
Unknown grave #5

== See also ==
- List of historic properties in Superior, Arizona
- National Register of Historic Places listings in Pinal County, Arizona
