= Cosnino, Arizona =

Populated place in Coconino County, Arizona, US

- Populated place
- Location within the state of Arizona Cosnino, Arizona (the United States)
- Coordinates: 35°12′20″N 111°28′30″W
- Country: United States
- State: Arizona
- County: Coconino
- Elevation: 6,467 ft (1,971 m)
- Time zone: UTC-7 (Mountain (MST))
  - Summer (DST): UTC-7 (MST)
- Area code: 928
- FIPS code: 04-16250
- GNIS feature ID: 27987

Cosnino is a populated place situated in Coconino County, Arizona, United States, located several miles east of Flagstaff, the county seat.

== Geography ==
It has an estimated elevation of 6,466 feet (1,971 m) above sea level, and lies in the Rio de Flag drainage basin.

== History ==
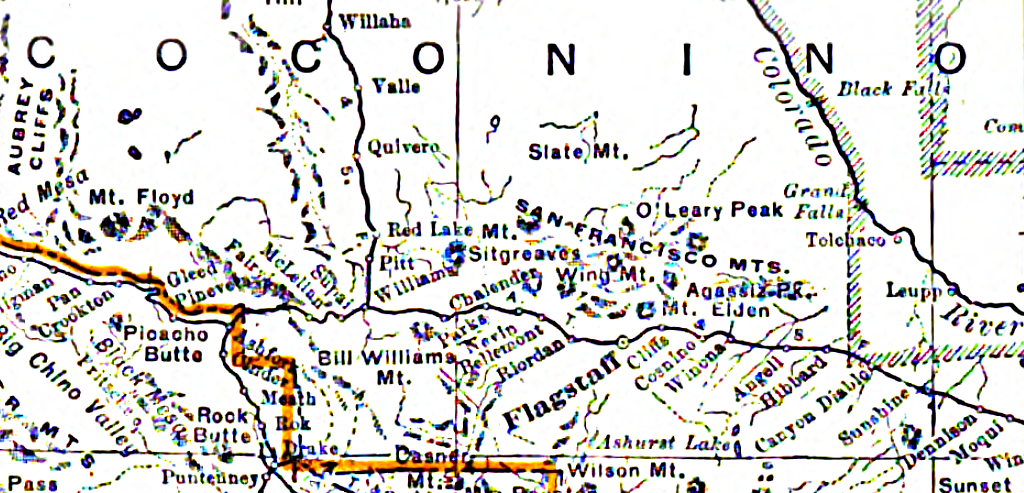
Cosnino in central Coconino County, Arizona, in 1925

By 1893, Cosnino was a railroad siding on the Santa Fe railroad. Two trains collided east of Cosnino in October 1893.

Cosnino was the site of a telegraph office, which was closed in 1913, in favor of Winona, Arizona.

The Cosnino community club was active in the 1910s and 1920s.

A schoolhouse was built in Cosnino in 1924. The Cosnino school was a one-room schoolhouse built one mile from the highway on Walnut Canyon Road, in what the Coconino Sun called "an ideal setting for a rural school". The Cosnino school had an enrollment of 15 in 1926. The school was unusual in that due to heavy snow in the winters, the annual vacation period ran from November to March.

The Cosnino school was also used as a meeting house and was proposed as a location for Sunday school. Community events were also held at the Cosnino schoolhouse. The school in Cosnino was later integrated into the Flagstaff school system.

Cosnino's population in the 1960 Census was 15.

In the 1970s, Cosnino Arena, on Cosnino Road, was the site of 4-H and other agrarian events for area communities.

In 1976, proposals were put forward for a new subdivision in the area, called Cosnino Equestrian Estates. The Cosnino Estates area was evacuated in 1988 after a train derailed near Cosnino Road.

== See also ==
- Riordan, Arizona
