= Reymert, Arizona =

Ghost town in Pinal County, Arizona

- Ghost town
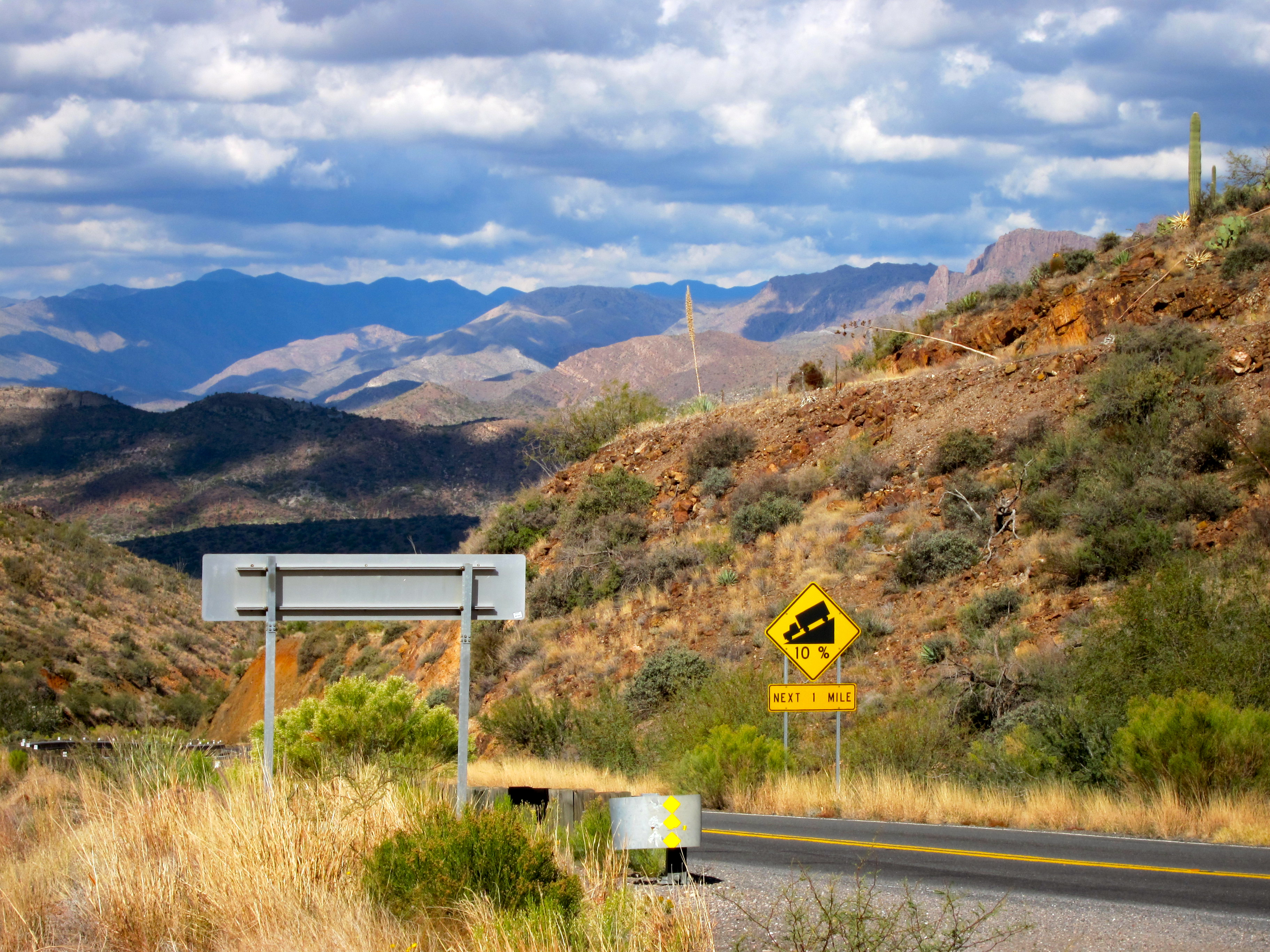
- Site of Reymert from US-60

- Location within Arizona
- Coordinates: 33°13′47″N 111°12′33″W
- Country: United States
- State: Arizona
- County: Pinal
- Elevation: 2,802 ft (854 m)
- Time zone: UTC-7 (MST (no DST))

Reymert is a ghost town in Pinal County, Arizona, United States.

Reymert was originally established around a post office that began operation on June 6, 1890. Reymert was named after its founder, James DeNoon Reymart, who also founded the adjacent milling and smelting town of DeNoon. James Reymert also was the editor of the Pinal Drill newspaper published in the nearby town of Pinal City.

The town's occupants largely worked at Reymert Mine, until work there stopped in the 1950s. Originally a silver mine, later a silver-manganese mine, it was located approximately five miles southwest of Superior. A Phoenix-based company bulldozed the remnants of the town in the late 1970s. The remains of two processing kilns still exist, as well as a number of stacked stone foundations.
