= DeNoon, Arizona =

Ghost town in Pinal County

Coordinates: 33.2299°N 111.2091°W

DeNoon is a ghost town located 13 miles (21 km) southwest of Superior in Pinal County, Arizona, United States. The town served as a milling town for the Reymert Mine, which was 2 miles (3.2 km) away. James DeNoon Reymert founded and named the town in 1889. The town grew quickly, and its own post office opened on March 19, 1890; however, the post office closed the following year, and the town disappeared soon afterwards.
