= Silver King Mine =

Inactive mine in Pinal County, Arizona

Coordinates: 33°19′49″N 111°5′19″W

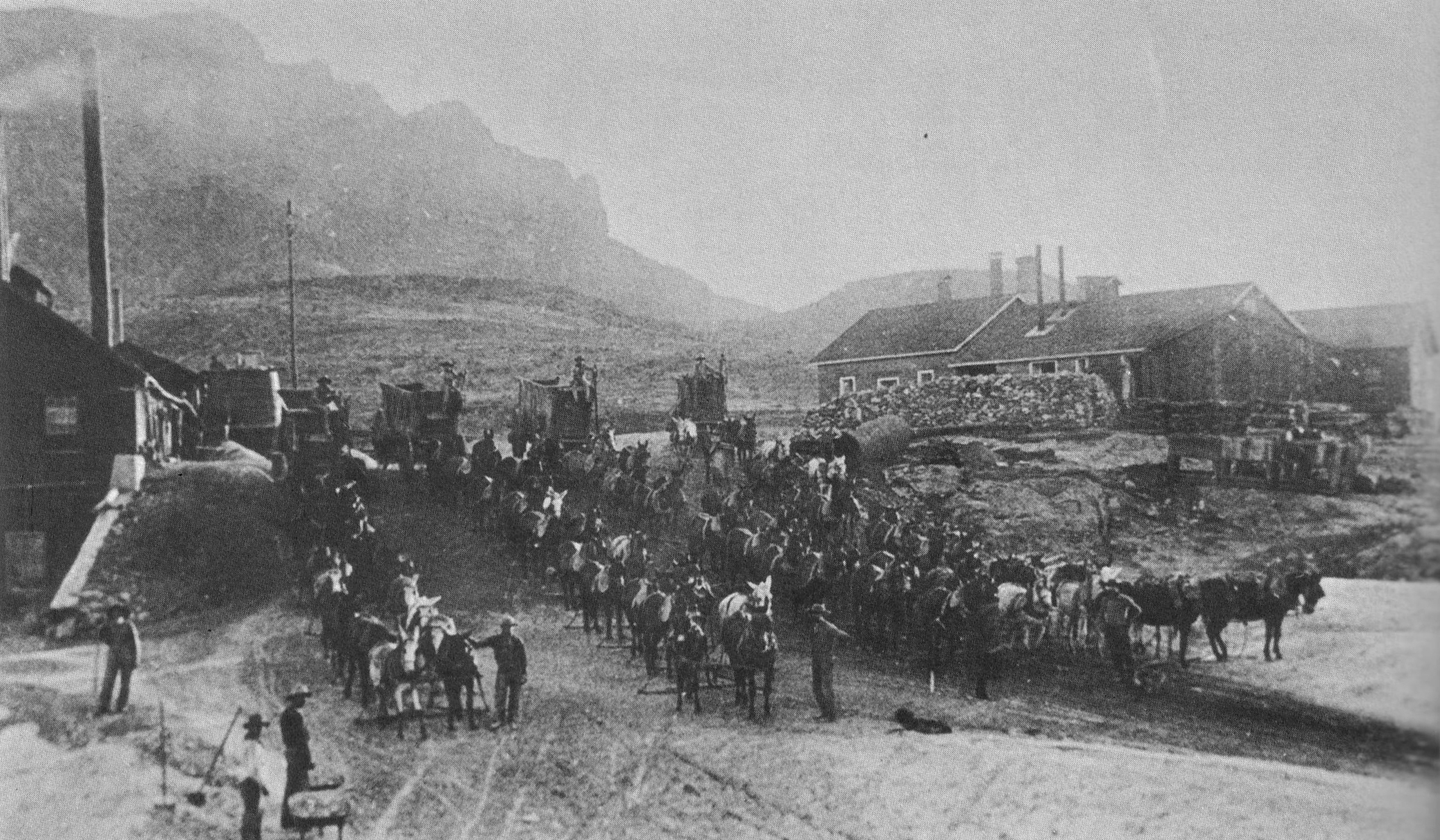
Ore wagons from the Silver King mine at the Pinal mills, circa 1885

The Silver King Mine is an inactive silver mine located near Superior, Arizona in the United States. The richest silver mine in Arizona, it produced an estimated US$42 million worth of silver ore between 1875 and 1900.

The mine is located on four patented claims in Comstock Wash, about 1 mile west of Kings Crown Peak and about 3 miles north of Superior, in sec. 24, T1S, R12E.

== Discovery ==
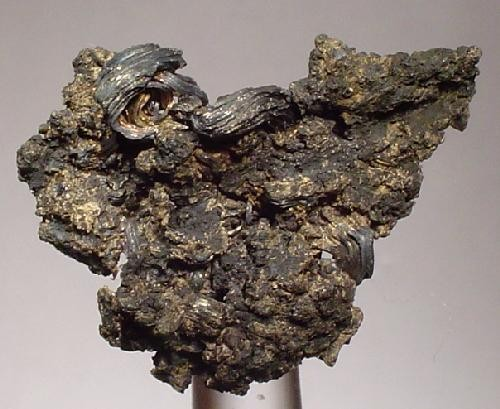
Native silver from the Silver King mine, collected prior to 1888.

The Silver King Mine traces its beginning to 1870, during the Apache Wars. General George Stoneman, desiring an easier access route to Apache strongholds, had ordered the construction of a road from Camp Picketpost into the Pinal Mountains. The road became known as the Stoneman Grade. A soldier named Sullivan, who was assigned to the construction, discovered some heavy black rocks that flattened when struck. Interested in the rock, he collected several samples but did not mention this to his fellow soldiers. After completing his term of service, Sullivan went to work on a ranch owned by Charles Mason. Sullivan routinely showed off the rocks, known as "nugget silver" to prospectors of the region, but never divulged the location of the discovery. After a time, Sullivan disappeared and was assumed to have been killed by Apache.

Mason, joining with Benjamin W. Regan, William H. Long, Isaac Copeland, and another companion went searching for the location of Sullivan's find. On March 21, 1875 the group was attacked by Apache and the unnamed companion was killed and buried near the summit of Stoneman Grade. Following the burial, one of the group's mules strayed. Copeland was sent to find the wayward animal, locating it near the base of Stoneman Grade. Upon finding the mule, Copeland noticed an unusual rock outcropping and upon closer inspection saw markings that had been left by Sullivan. Sullivan's find had been located.

== Geology and mineralization ==
Mineralization is hosted in Pinal Schist and in Silver King Quartz Diorite. Veinlets are interlaced in quartz diorite porphyry and Pinal Schist. The orebody formerly cropped out at the top of a little hill about 75 feet high, composed of heavily-altered yellowish-brown to greenish-gray porphyry. Stromeyerite and highly argentiferous tetrahedrite with some acanthite were the most important ore minerals in the upper levels, and argentiferous sphalerite had become the principal ore mineral in the lower levels of the mine.

== Operation ==
Following a highly favorable assayer report, the four surviving partners divided ownership of the find equally. Initially the mine's ore was shipped directly to San Francisco for processing. Shortly thereafter, a smelting operation was set up several miles from the mine along the Arnett Creek. A mining camp, which grew into Pinal City, quickly formed at the processing site.

Initially operating the mine together, Copeland sold his interest to Mason in June 1876 with Long selling his interest several months later to Regan. Mason and Regan, who had spent US$80,000 to buy out their partner's interests, later sold their interests to James M. Barney for US$250,000 and US$300,000 respectively.

The operations continued until 1888, when a combination of deteriorating ore quality and lower silver prices prompted the mine to close. Sporadic, small-scale mining continued into the 1980s. Recorded production 5,943,157 oz. Ag, valued at $6,526,094 (1875-1889), and 232,764 oz. Ag valued at $252,674 (1918-1928) (period values).
