= Richville, Arizona =

- Populated place
- Location within the state of Arizona Richville (the United States)
- Coordinates: 34°17′10″N 109°21′19″W
- Country: United States
- State: Arizona
- County: Apache
- Elevation: 6,079 ft (1,853 m)
- Time zone: UTC-7 (Mountain (MST))
  - Summer (DST): UTC-7 (MST)
- Area code: 928
- FIPS code: 04-59830
- GNIS feature ID: 25271

Richville is a populated place situated in Apache County, Arizona, United States. It has an estimated elevation of 6,079 feet (1,853 m) above sea level. Established approximately 12 miles north from Springerville on the Little Colorado River, it was originally named Walnut Grove, after a stand of walnut trees found in the location. It became known as Richey, after Joseph P. Richey, whose family settled the community. The name eventually morphed into the current Richville. A post office was opened there on June 23, 1892.
