= Pinal City, Arizona =

Ghost town in Pinal County, Arizona

Pinal, Arizona
- Ghost town
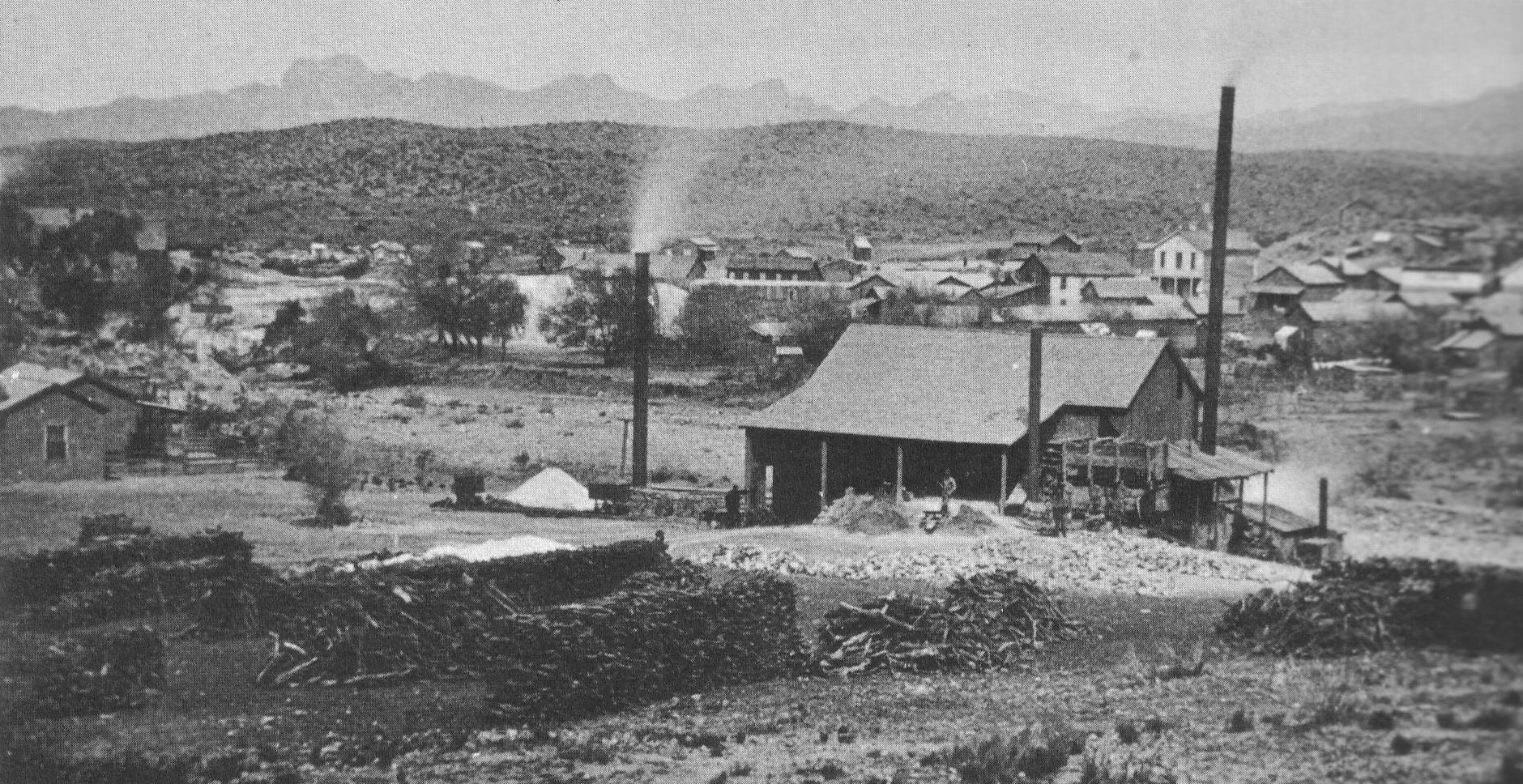
- View of the mill and town of Pinal, c. 1880

- Location within Arizona Location within the United States
- Coordinates: 33°16′41″N 111°08′21″W
- Country: United States
- State: Arizona
- County: Pinal
- Founded: 1878
- Abandoned: 1891
- Elevation: 2,530 ft (770 m)

Population (2009)
  - Total: 0
- Time zone: UTC-7 (MST (no DST))
- Post Office opened: April 10, 1878
- Post Office closed: November 28, 1891

Pinal or Pinal City is a ghost town in Pinal County in the U.S. state of Arizona. The town was populated from the 1870s into the 1890s, in what was then the Arizona Territory.

The Boyce Thompson Arboretum is said to be on the site of Pinal City. Only a few foundations remain at the old townsite. The LOST Trail system crosses from the Arizona Trail to the Town of Superior, crossing through the old Pinal town site. From the USFS "This Legends of Superior Trail connects the historic mining town of Superior with the Arizona Trail, 6 miles to the west. Along the way it passes through the high Sonoran Desert, the remains of the abandoned town of Pinal, and the riparian forest along Queen Creek, all while under the gaze of the majestic Picketpost Mountain to the south and Apache Leap to the east. Along the way you will find numbered stations on posts where you can use this brochure to learn more about the history and environment of this uniquely beautiful area."

== History ==
After an abortive settlement by troops under General George Stoneman from November 1870 to August 1871 the area was developed by prospectors and ranchers. Silver was discovered resulting in a boom town of about two thousand residents at the foot of Picket Post Mountain by 1878. The post office was established on April 10, 1878, as Picket Post, and the name was formally changed to Pinal on June 27, 1879.

When the Silver King Mine played out, Pinal City went into steep decline. The post office closed on November 28, 1891, and the town was deserted shortly thereafter.

The nearby Silver Queen mine continued and gradually became a better producer of copper, forming the basis of the town site of Superior by 1900.

Celia Ann "Mattie" Blaylock, once Wyatt Earp's common law wife lived in Pinal City. She died from an alcohol and laudanum overdose and is buried in the Pinal Pioneer Cemetery.

== Pinal City Images ==
The wagon wheel tracks pictured were made by the wagons which hauled the heavy ore from the Silver King Mine to Pinal City.

Pinal City, Arizona

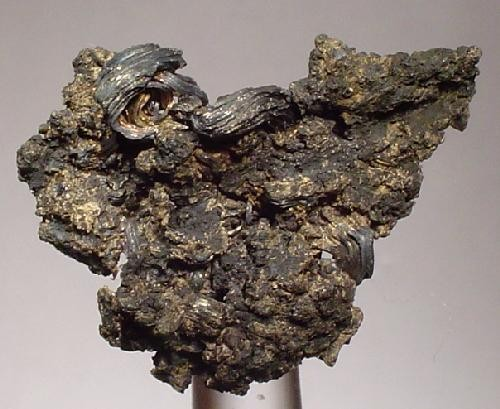
Native silver specimen from the Silver King mine, collected before 1888

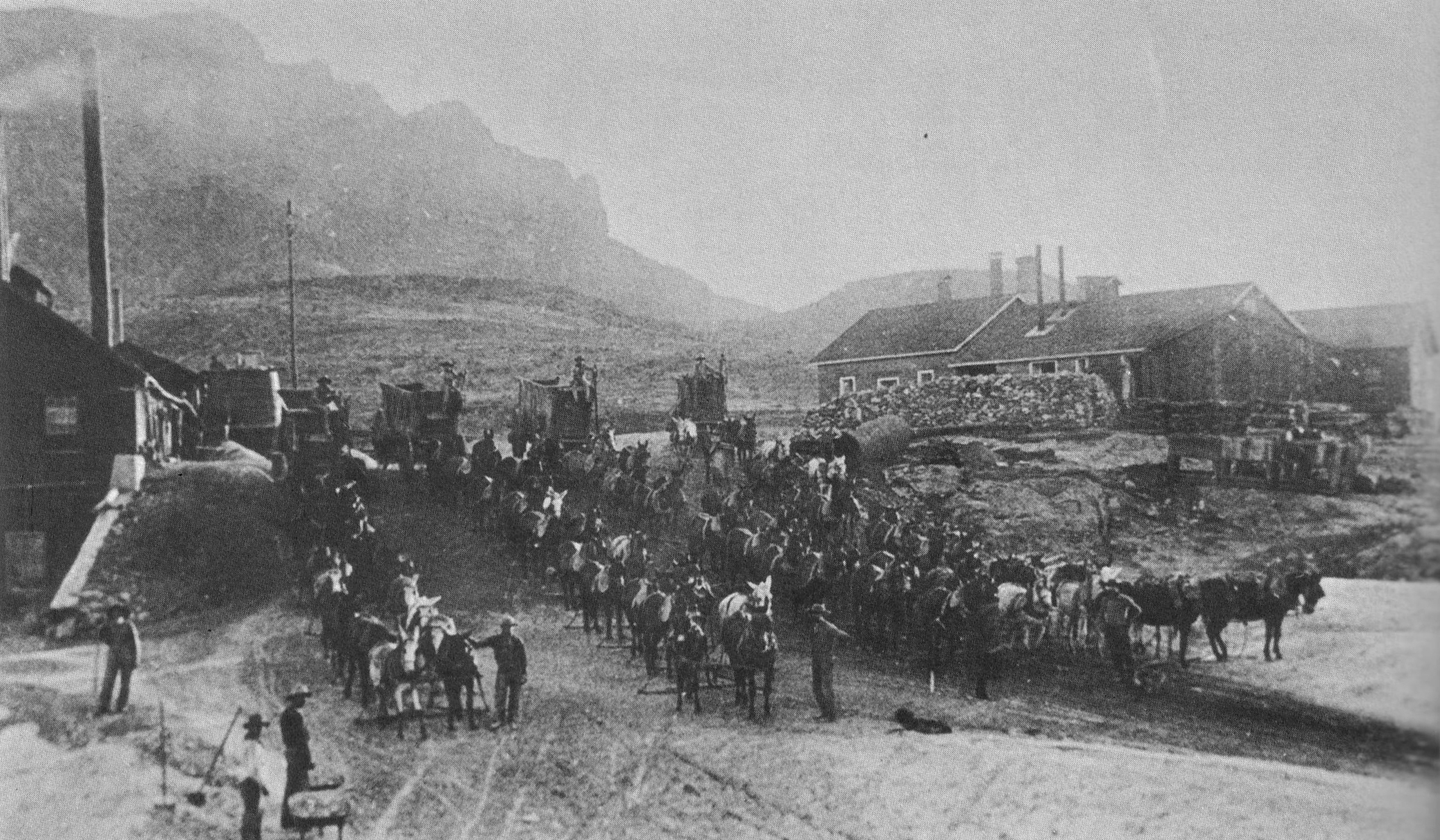
Ore wagons from the Silver King Mine at the Pinal mills, circa 1885

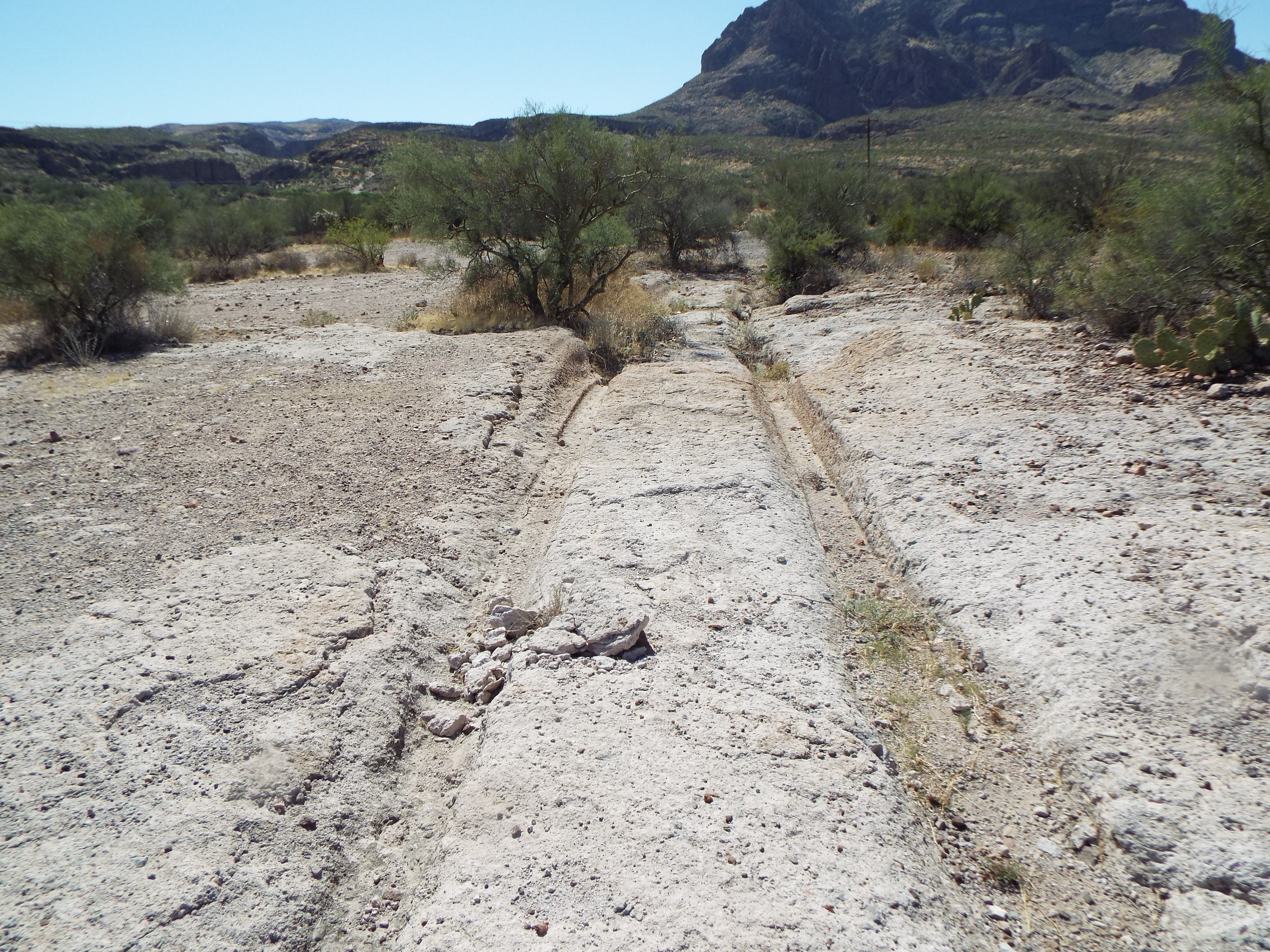
Wagon Wheel Tracks with the Picket Post Mountain in the background

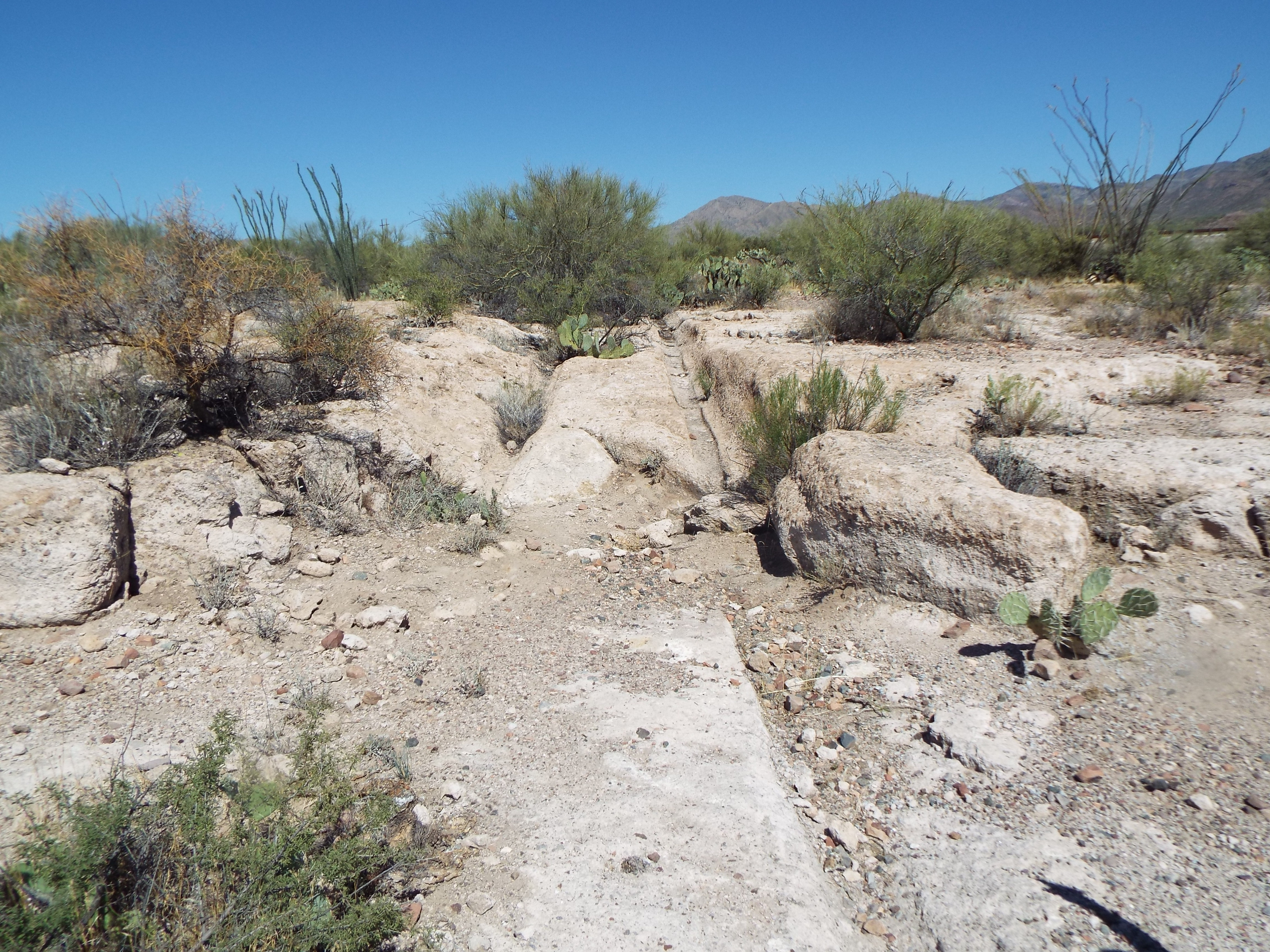
Different view of the Wagon Wheel Tracks 1882

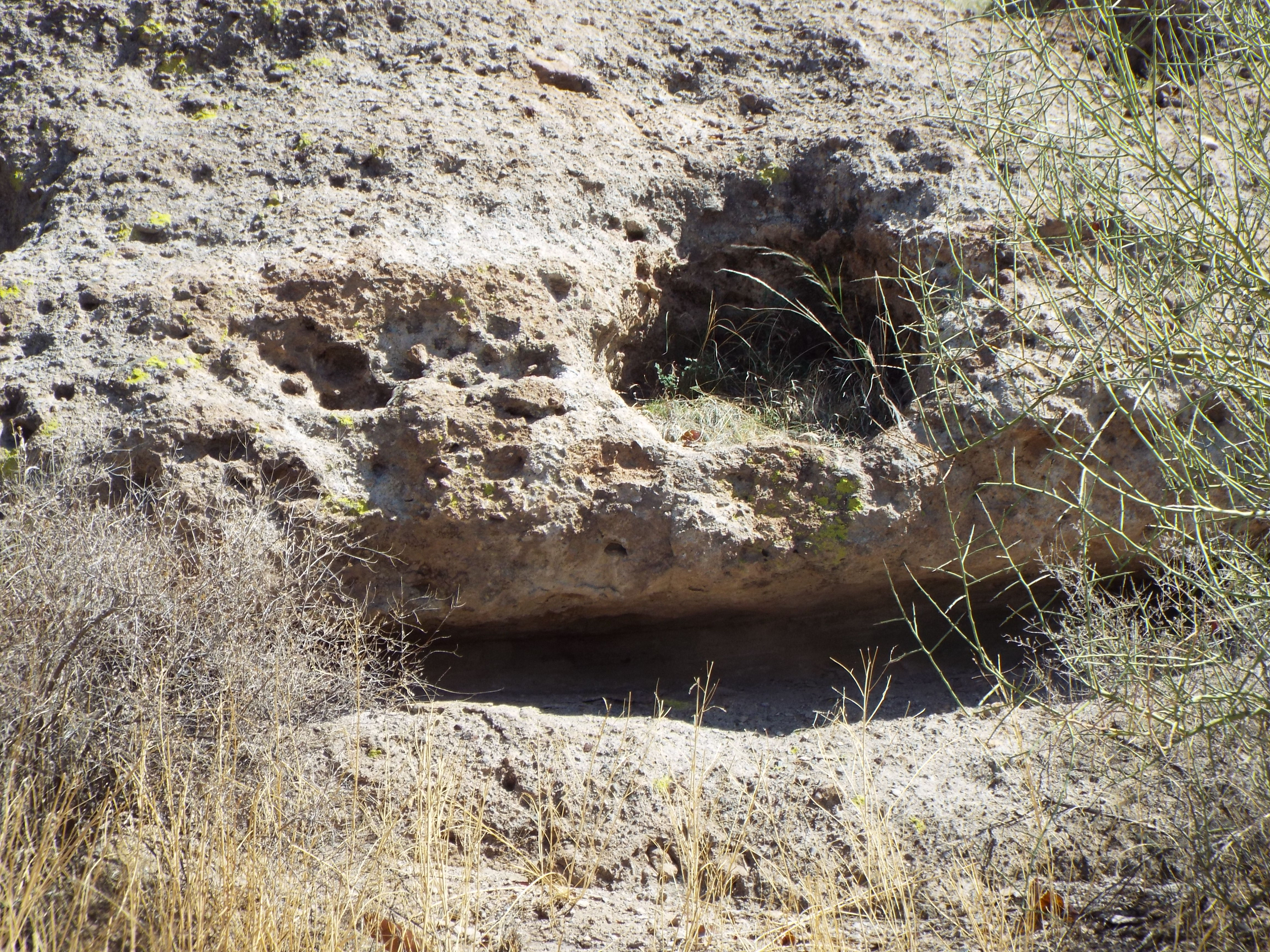
Gold cave in Pinal City

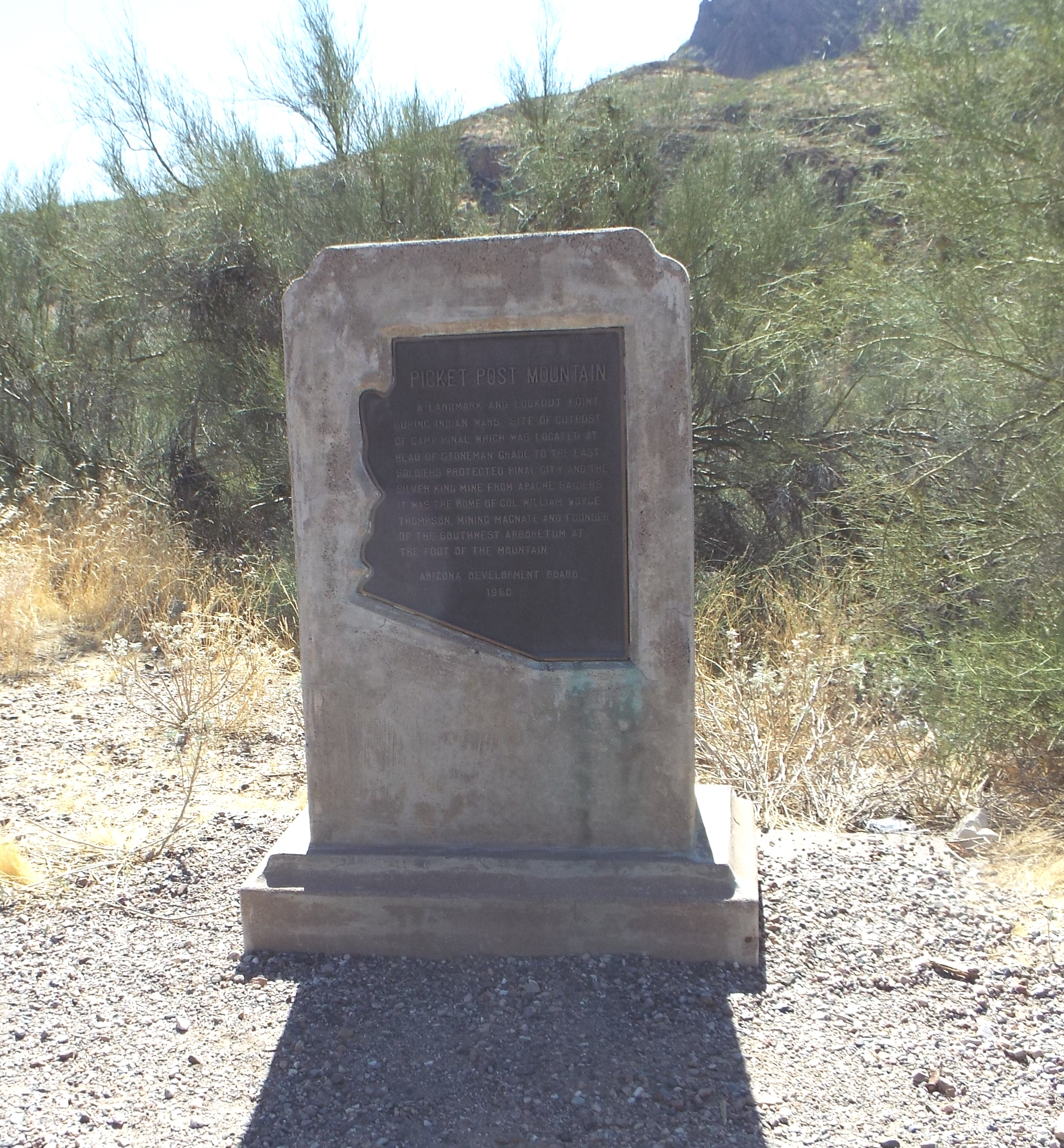
Picket Post Mountain Marker

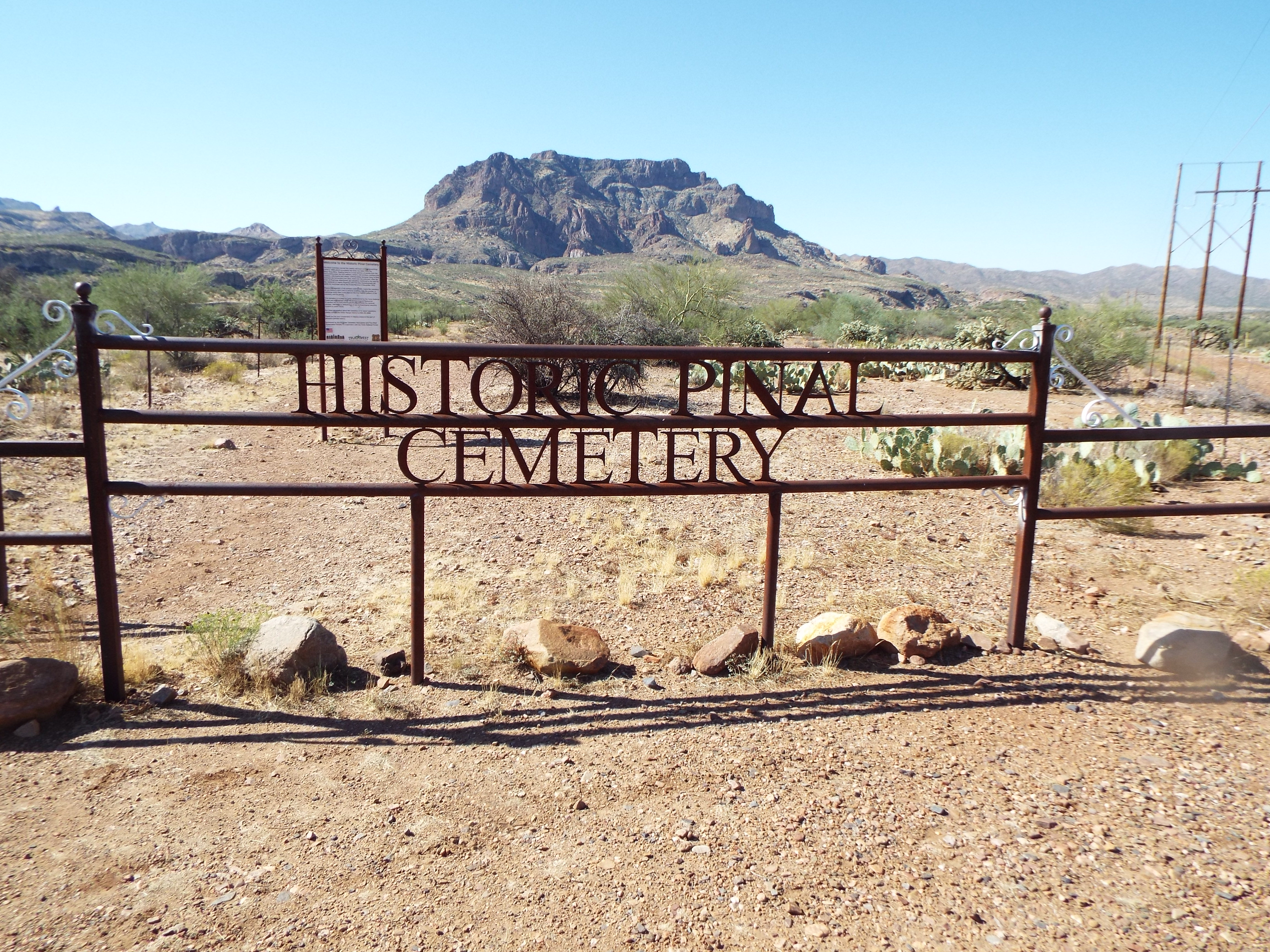
Historic Pinal Cemetery

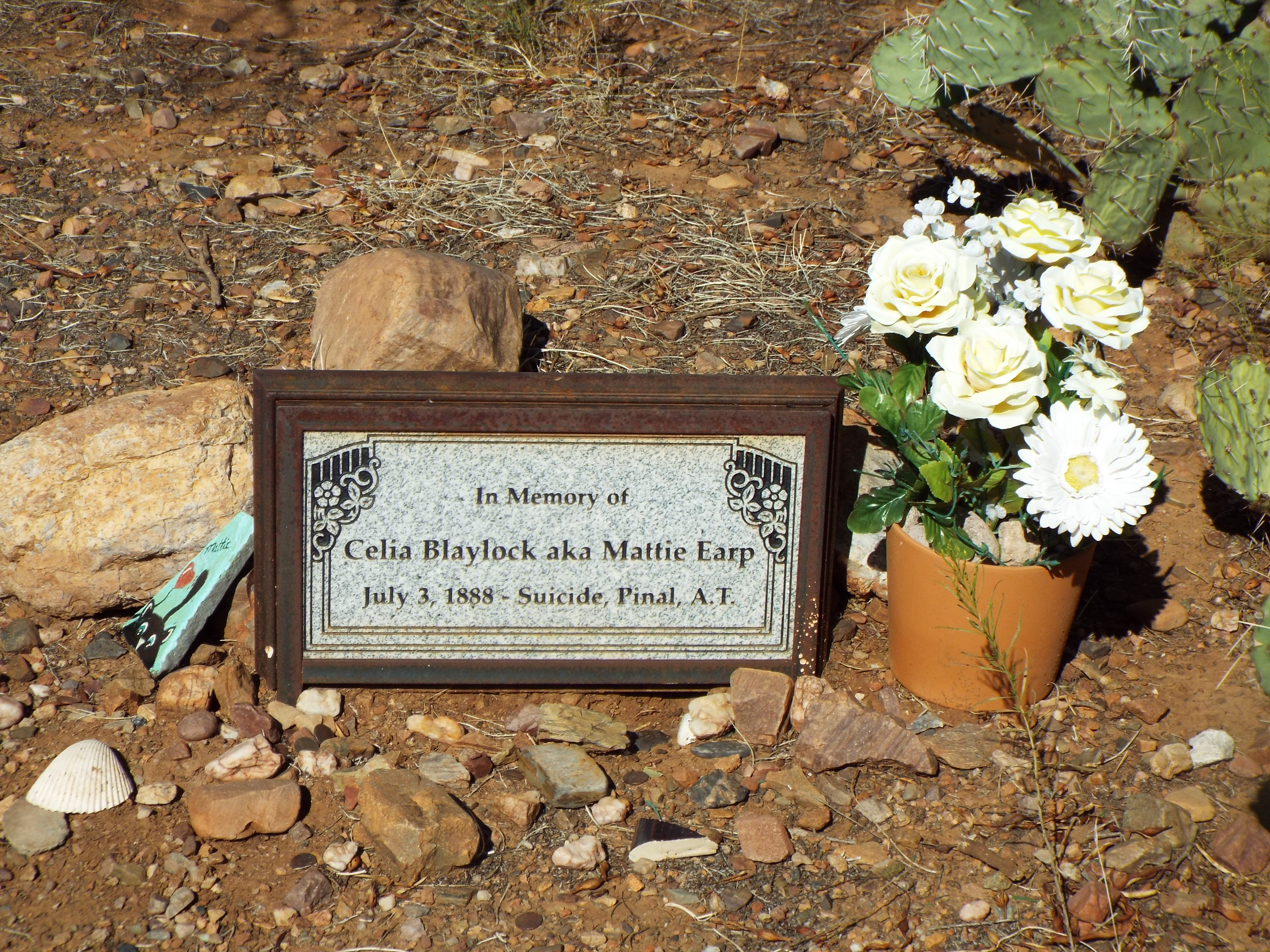
Grave-site of Ceilia Ann "Mattie" Blaylock Earp

== See also ==
- Historic Pinal Cemetery
