= Rosemont Camp, Arizona =

- Populated place
- Location within the state of Arizona Rosemont Camp (the United States)
- Coordinates: 31°49′30″N 110°44′05″W
- Country: United States
- State: Arizona
- County: Pima
- Elevation: 4,862 ft (1,482 m)
- Time zone: UTC-7 (Mountain (MST))
  - Summer (DST): UTC-7 (MST)
- Area code: 520
- FIPS code: 04-61340
- GNIS feature ID: 37495

Rosemont Camp is a populated place situated in Pima County, Arizona, United States. It has an estimated elevation of 4,862 feet (1,482 m) above sea level.
