= Rincon, Arizona =

- Populated place
- Location within the state of Arizona Rincon (the United States)
- Coordinates: 32°04′34″N 111°55′04″W
- Country: United States
- State: Arizona
- County: Pima
- Elevation: 2,595 ft (791 m)
- Time zone: UTC-7 (Mountain (MST))
  - Summer (DST): UTC-7 (MST)
- Area code: 520
- FIPS code: 04-60110
- GNIS feature ID: 24582

Rincon is a populated place situated in Pima County, Arizona, United States. It has an estimated elevation of 2,595 feet (791 m) above sea level.
