= Queens Well, Arizona =

Populated place in Pima County, Arizona

- Populated place
- Location within the state of Arizona Queens Well (the United States)
- Coordinates: 32°16′03″N 111°38′00″W
- Country: United States
- State: Arizona
- County: Pima
- Elevation: 2,041 ft (622 m)
- Time zone: UTC-7 (Mountain (MST))
  - Summer (DST): UTC-7 (MST)
- Area code: 520
- GNIS feature ID: 24193

Queens Well is a populated place in Pima County, Arizona. It has an estimated elevation of 2,041 feet (622 m) above sea level. Queens Well is located in the Schuk Toak District on the east side of the Tohono O’odham Nation. The area had multiple solar powered wells installed in the 1970s and 1980s.

In the 2023 Tohono O'odham Nation Election, Katrina Lopez was elected as the community representative for Queens Well.

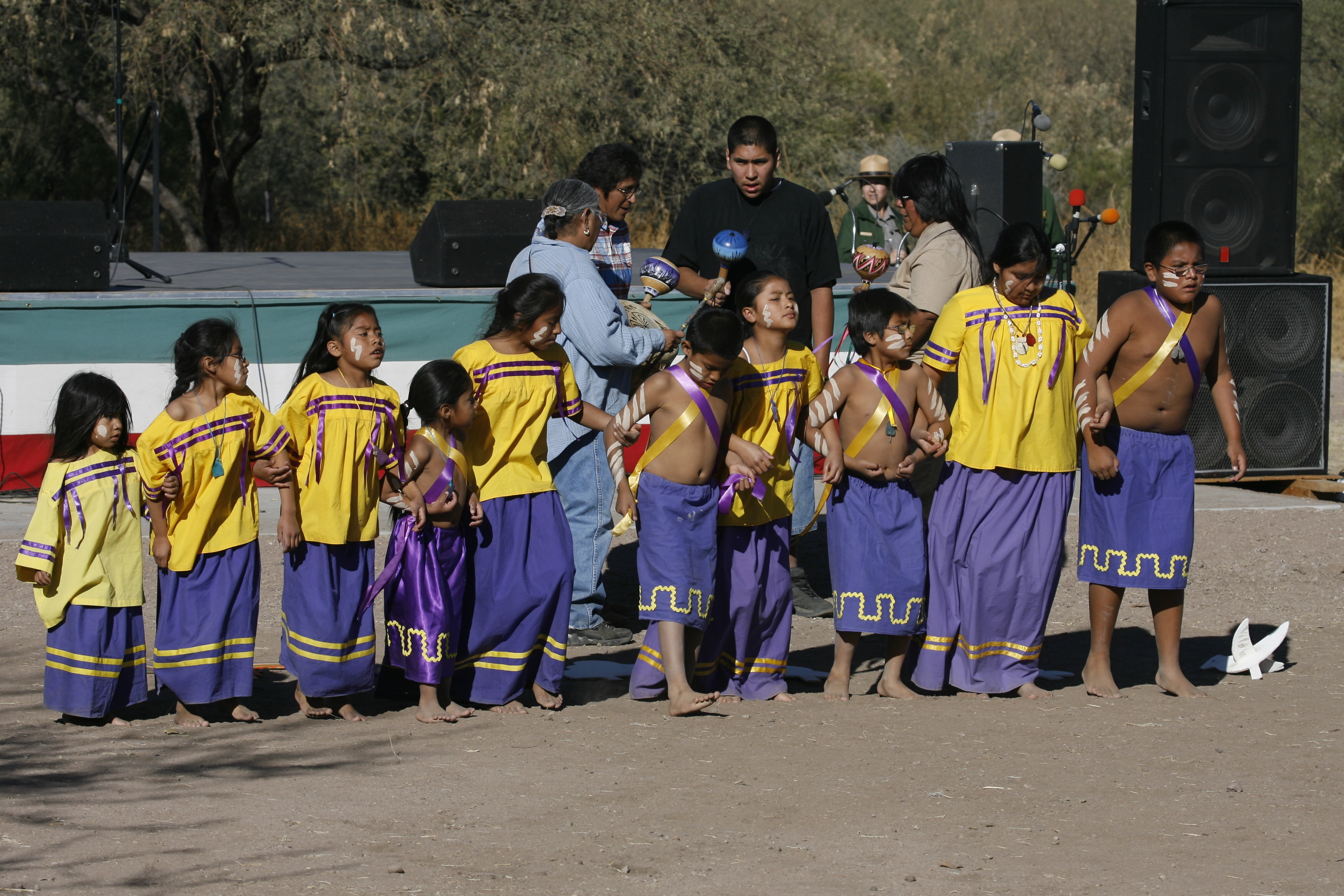
O'odham children from Queen's Well performing a traditional dance
