= Rowood, Arizona =

- Populated place
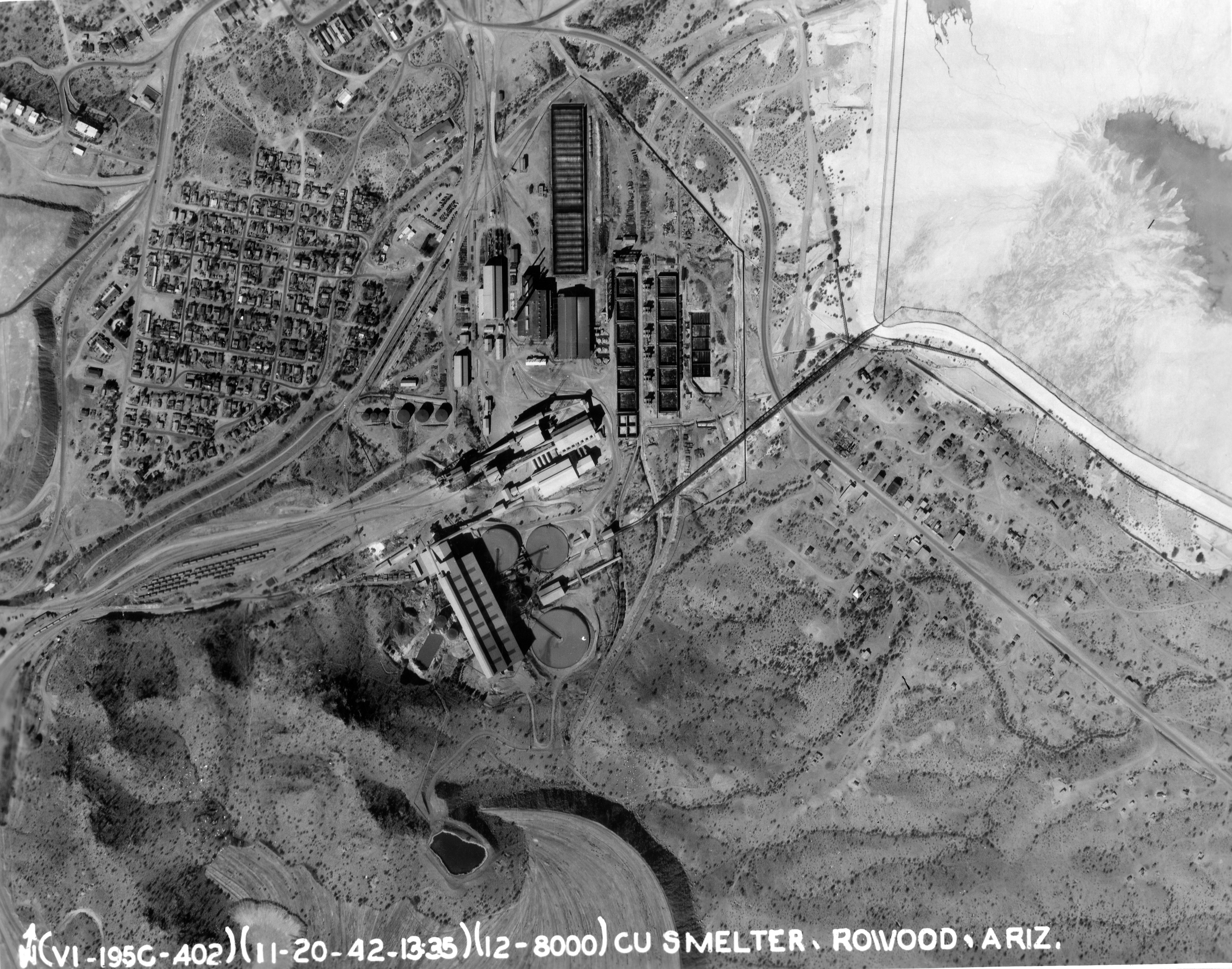
- Rowood Copper Smeltery, which does no longer exist today

- Location within the state of Arizona Rowood (the United States)
- Coordinates: 32°22′06″N 112°50′46″W
- Country: United States
- State: Arizona
- County: Pima
- Elevation: 1,719 ft (524 m)
- Time zone: UTC-7 (Mountain (MST))
  - Summer (DST): UTC-7 (MST)
- Area code: 520
- FIPS code: 04-61450
- GNIS feature ID: 24591

Rowood is a populated place situated in Pima County, Arizona, United States. It has an estimated elevation of 1,719 feet (524 m) above sea level.
