= Mattie Blaylock =

Wife of Wyatt Earp (1850–1888)

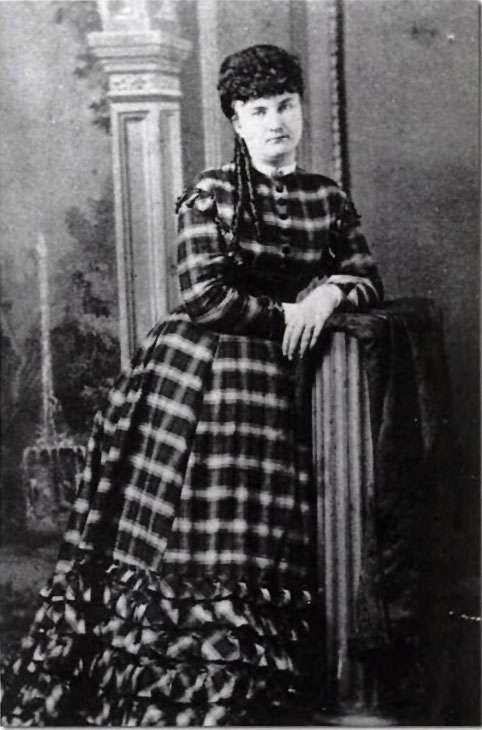
- Mattie Blaylock
- Born: Celia Ann Blaylock; 1850; Johnson County, Iowa
- Died: July 3, 1888 (aged 37–38); Pinal City, Arizona
- Cause of death: Suicide by poisoning
- Other name: Celie
- Occupation: Prostitute
- Years active: 1873–1888
- Spouse: Wyatt Earp (common-law husband)

Celia Ann "Mattie" Blaylock (January 1850 – July 3, 1888) was a prostitute who became the romantic companion and common-law wife of Old West lawman and gambler Wyatt Earp for about six years. Knowledge of her place in Wyatt's life was concealed by Josephine Earp, his later common-law wife, who worked ceaselessly to protect her and Wyatt's reputation in their later years. Blaylock's relationship with Earp was rediscovered by Earp researcher John Gilchriese and author Frank Waters in the 1950s, when they uncovered a coroner's report for “Mattie Earp” and a deathbed conversation in which she told someone, “Wyatt Earp had ruined my life.”

== Early life ==
Mattie was born Celia Ann Blaylock in Monroe Township, Johnson County, Iowa, near Fairfax, Iowa, to Henry Blaylock and Elizabeth "Betsy" Vance. She was their third child and second daughter. The family lived on a small farm that Henry had obtained in 1846. Henry and his wife were stern parents and adhered to the principle, "spare the rod and spoil the child," and "children should be seen and not heard."

Celia, or "Celie" as she was known as a child, attended Sunday school, learned Biblical parables, and was taught to live by the Ten Commandments. When her older sister Martha Jane was 17, she married Charles Probst on July 1, 1870. Celia had no desire to live on a farm for the rest of her life.

== Runs away ==
In mid-1868, Celia ran away with her younger sister Sarah to avoid farm life. Celia was a reasonably skilled seamstress and may have sought work in that field, but both girls found life on their own very difficult. There were few employment possibilities for young girls, and they likely headed west to one of the growing towns along the Kansas–Iowa–Missouri border area. Sarah returned home less than a year later, chagrined and shamed by her experience. Her parents greeted her cheerlessly and took her back in disgrace.

At some point after leaving home, Celia chose the alias "Mattie", probably in an effort to conceal her identity and remain as anonymous as possible. However, court records indicate that she continued to call herself by her childhood nickname of "Celie", which was often phonetically spelled by court clerks as "Sally"; no court records have been found throughout her life using the name "Mattie". The first known record of Mattie's presence is a picture taken in Fort Scott in 1871. It is not known where she and Sarah spent the intervening time. Court records show that she became a prostitute beginning in 1872 in Fort Scott, then later in Dodge City.

== Meets Wyatt Earp ==
Mattie Blaylock began a relationship with Earp after April 1876 in Dodge City, following his departure from Wichita, Kansas and the end of his relationship with Sally Heckell, who called herself Sally Earp. Earp was appointed assistant marshal in Dodge City under Marshal Lawrence Deger around May 1876. Blaylock continued to work as a prostitute. Earp resigned from the Dodge City police force on September 9, 1879, and traveled to Las Vegas, New Mexico Territory with Blaylock, his brother Jim, and Jim's wife Bessie. There they reunited with Holliday and Big Nose Kate. The six friends traveled to Prescott, Arizona. Then Blaylock and Earp stopped in the booming silver town of Pinal City, Arizona Territory, for two months in 1879. Wyatt, Virgil, and Morgan Earp with their wives arrived in Tombstone on December 1, 1879. In the 1880 United States Census of Tombstone, Blaylock is listed as Wyatt's wife though there is no record of a legal marriage.

Blaylock suffered from severe headaches and while in Tombstone, Arizona she became addicted to laudanum, a then-common opiate and pain killer. It is not known exactly when Earp and Blaylock ended their relationship. Tombstone diarist George W. Parsons never mentioned seeing Earp and his next common-law wife, Josephine "Sadie" Marcus, together and neither did John Clum in his memoirs. Frank Waters wrote in The Earp Brothers of Tombstone of public fights between Sadie Marcus and Blaylock and how the affair was a public scandal. However, Waters' book has been criticized as biased for its negative portrayal of Wyatt Earp and for including details not mentioned in the original manuscript by Allie Earp (the common-law wife of Wyatt Earp's brother Virgil).

After the Gunfight at the O.K. Corral and the March 18, 1882, assassination of Morgan Earp, Wyatt Earp, his youngest brother Warren, and a posse of other deputies began a vendetta. They hunted down some of the outlaw Cochise County Cowboys they believed responsible for maiming Virgil Earp and killing Morgan. In early April, Wyatt left Arizona for New Mexico and then Colorado.

Blaylock left Tombstone with other Earp family members for Colton, California. She apparently expected to receive a telegram from Earp telling her where to meet him, but it never arrived. Instead, Earp left Colorado in late 1882 and arrived in San Francisco where Virgil was seeking treatment for his arm. Wyatt began a relationship with Josephine "Sadie" Marcus, who had during 1880-81 been in a relationship with Johnny Behan in Tombstone. Blaylock left Colton and returned to Pinal City, but the silver boom had died out and the bulk of the town's population had moved on. Blaylock planned to return to prostitution in Pinal City, but with most of the prospective clientele gone with the silver, making a living there proved difficult.

== Death ==
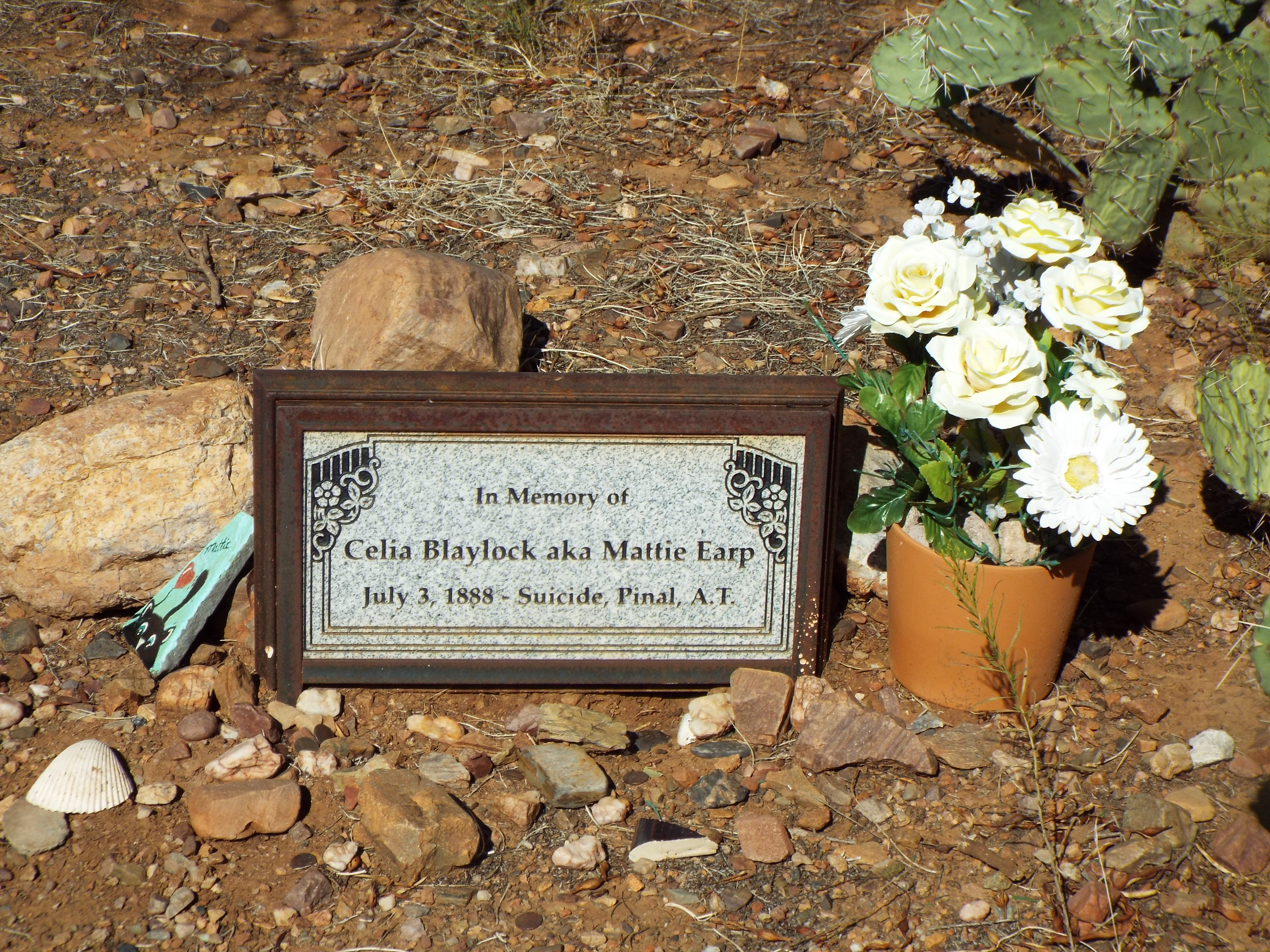
Gravesite

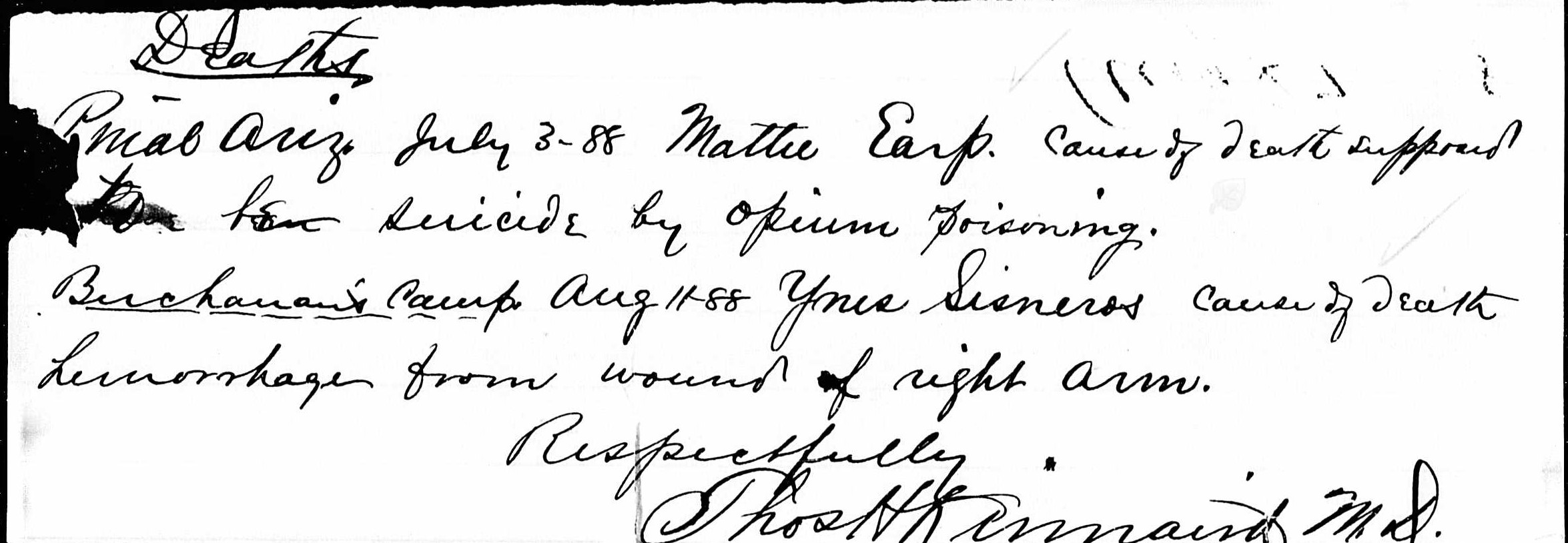
Death record

On July 3, 1888, Blaylock took a lethal dose of laudanum and alcohol. Her death was ruled as "suicide by opium poisoning". She had been using laudanum and alcohol to excess for some time. It is possible she overdosed by accident and died of respiratory depression. The coroner's report of her death was brief. She is buried in the cemetery at Pinal City, now a ghost town, located just west of the former mining town of Superior, Arizona.

== In popular culture ==
Mattie Blaylock was portrayed by Dana Wheeler-Nicholson in the 1993 film Tombstone. She was played by Mare Winningham in the 1994 film Wyatt Earp.
