= Riordan, Arizona =

Populated place in Coconino County, Arizona, US

- Populated place
- Location within the state of Arizona Riordan (the United States)
- Coordinates: 35°11′33″N 111°44′14″W
- Country: United States
- State: Arizona
- County: Coconino
- Elevation: 7,320 ft (2,230 m)
- Time zone: UTC-7 (Mountain (MST))
  - Summer (DST): UTC-7 (MST)
- Area code: 928
- FIPS code: 04-60170
- GNIS feature ID: 42729

Riordan was a populated place situated in Coconino County, Arizona, United States. It has an estimated elevation of 7,316 feet (2,230 m) above sea level.

Riordan was once the site of a train depot, lumber mills, a bunkhouse, post office, school, and store, but little remains today.

== Geography ==
Riordan was located on the Atchison, Topeka and Santa Fe Railway (AT&SF) approximately 6.5 miles (10.5 km) west of Flagstaff, Arizona. It was near the Arizona Divide.

== History ==
=== Early years ===
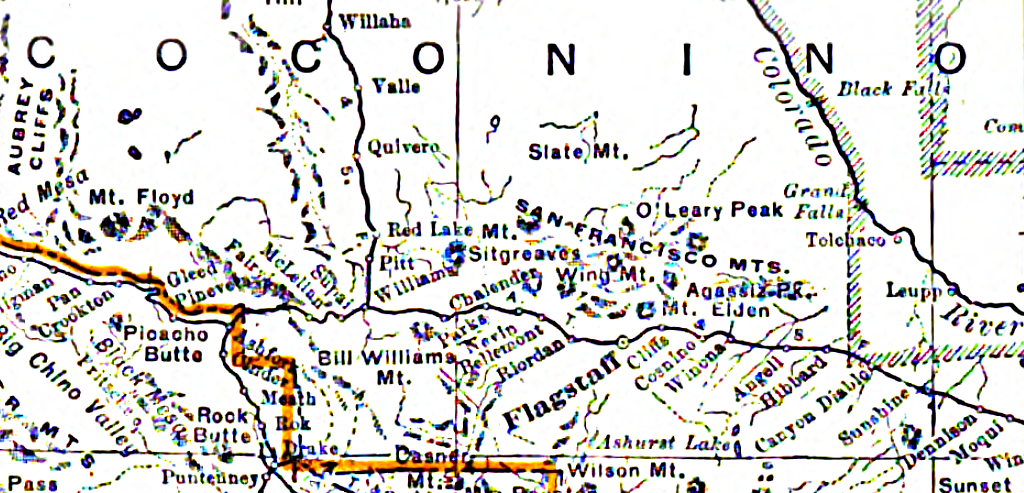
Riordan in central Coconino County, Arizona, in 1925

Brothers Michael and Timothy Riordan from Chicago established the Riordan Lumber Mill; the town of Riordan grew up around the Riordan Mill and was named in 1897. Riordan was named in honor of D.A. Riordan.

A second sawmill, owned by the Coconino Lumber Company, opened in Riordan in 1912. In June 1916, ownership of the Riordan mill passed to brothers Charles and Edward McGonigle. The name of the mill company was changed to the McGonigle Lumber Company, with its main offices in Riordan.

The Santa Fe Railway constructed a depot, bunkhouse, and several dwellings; the logging company established a store. The post office in Riordan was established in June 1917. At that time, the Flagstaff Coconino Sun stated that "Riordan is rapidly growing into a thriving little city".

The Church of the Nativity, a Catholic church in Flagstaff, operated a station in Riordan circa 1920.

The Riordan School operated briefly in the 1910s and 1920s. Originally, the Riordan School was in a rented building, but in 1913, Coconino County announced provisional plans to construct a new school building.

=== Decline ===
The McGonigle mill closed in June 1924 due to a slump in the lumber industry. The Riordan post office followed in September 1925. Riordan's population was 16 in 1925.

There were discussions in 1924 about closing the Riordan School, with local children going to school in Flagstaff. In 1926, the Riordan School District (#16) had one clerk and a single teacher, who taught first through eighth grade. The Riordan schoolhouse was sold that year.

In 1934, there was a major forest fire near Riordan. In June 1934, more than 500 acres of the Coconino National Forest burned before the blaze could be brought under control.

Riordan's population was 74 in 1940.

The Santa Fe Railway removed Riordan from its timetable in 1965, with the railroad buildings being removed thereafter.

By the late 1960s, the community had fallen into ruin, with the Phoenix Arizona Republic reporting that there was little left at the site in 1969.

== See also ==
- Canyon Diablo, Arizona
- House Rock, Arizona
