= State Highway 9 Bridge at the Llano River =

- U.S. National Register of Historic Places
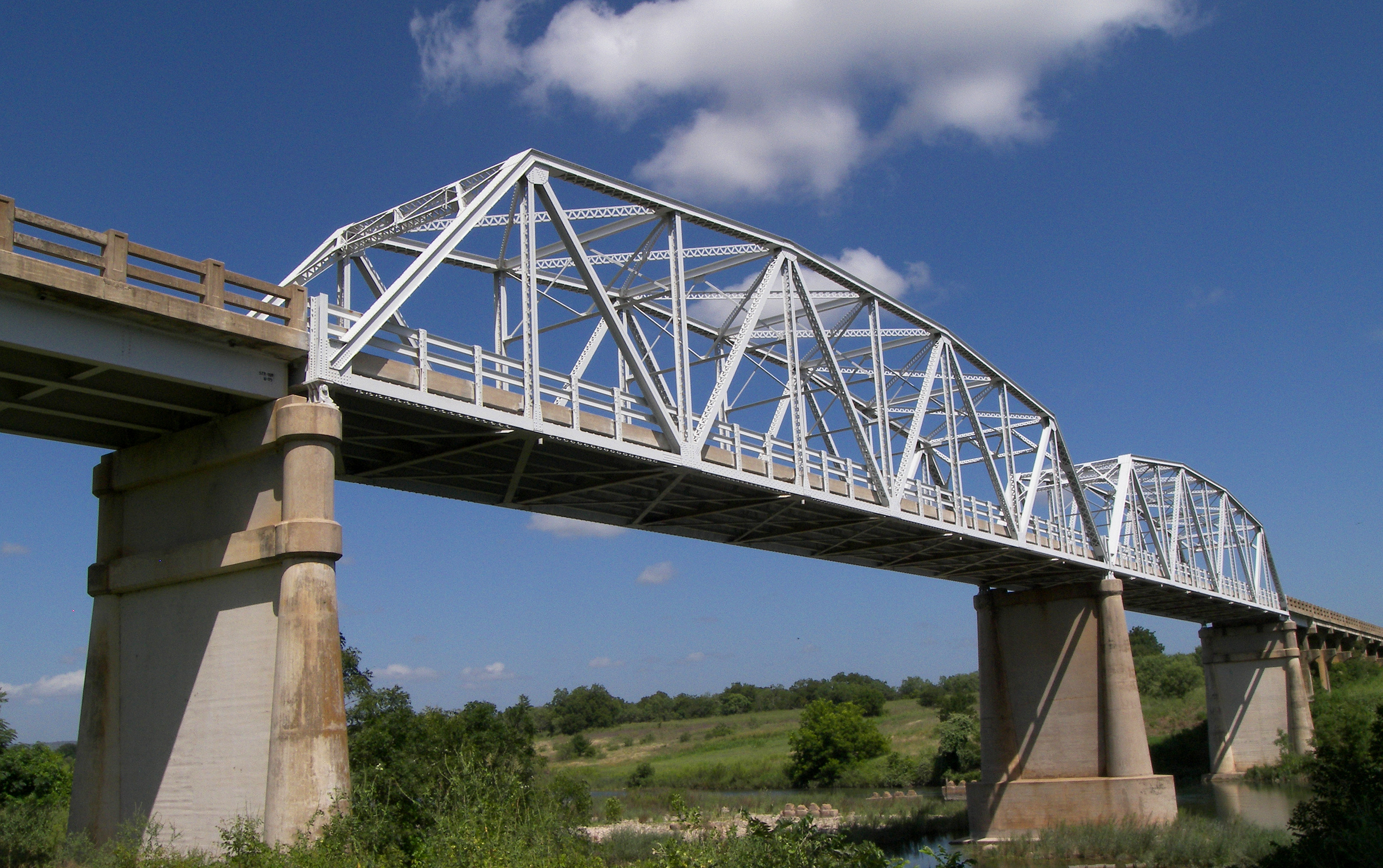
- State Highway 9 Bridge at the Llano River in 2010

- Location within Texas Location within the United States
- Location: U.S. Route 87; SH 29 at Llano River
- Coordinates: 30°39′40″N 99°6′34″W
- Area: less than one acre
- Built: 1936
- Built by: Froemming Brothers; Pittsburgh-Des Moines Steel Co.
- Architectural style: Parker through truss bridge
- MPS: Historic Bridges of Texas MPS
- NRHP reference No.: 96001128
- Added to NRHP: October 10, 1996

The State Highway 9 Bridge at the Llano River in Texas connects Mason County to the Gillespie County seat of Fredericksburg. On June 14, 1935, a disastrous flood crested the Llano River at 41.5 feet (10 m), washing out the two truss spans, as well as the center pier, of the 1930 bridge of State Highway 9 across the Llano River in Mason County, Texas. In effect, it isolated the town of Mason from the south. Reconstruction of the Llano River Bridge became an immediate priority.

The Texas Highway Department appealed to the Bureau of Public Roads (BPR) for emergency relief highway funds as provided for under Section 3 of the Hayden-Cartwright Act of 1934. In addition to extending federal relief funding established under the National Industrial Recovery Act of 1933, the Hayden-Cartwright Act provided emergency funds for the repair or reconstruction of highways and bridges on the federal aid system/”

The bridge consists of two riveted Warren polygonal-chord through truss spans, 12 concrete girder approach spans and two steel I-beam spans. By the late 1930s, the northern portion of State Highway 9 between the Texas Panhandle and San Antonio had become US 87. As of 2014, the bridge serves southbound lanes on US 87 linking Mason with Fredericksburg.

== See also ==
- Federal-Aid Highway Act
- List of longest continuous truss bridge spans
- State Highway 29 Bridge at the Colorado River
- National Register of Historic Places listings in Mason County, Texas
