= Honey Creek (Mason County, Texas) =

Archaeological site in Mason County, Texas

Coordinates: 30°38′57″N 99°18′45″W

- Material: Burned rock midden
- Created: 1110–1700 AD
- Discovered: 1987
- Present location: Mason County, Texas
- Identification: 41MS32

Honey Creek is a tributary of the Llano River, and an archaeological site located on the Edwards Plateau, between Grit and Streeter, in Mason County, Texas. The prehistoric midden site (41MS32) has been of interest to scientific research since 1987, when Glenn T. Goode of the Texas Department of Transportation uncovered it during an otherwise routine infrastructural project. Stephen L. Black and the Texas Archeological Research Laboratory included it in a wider study of burned-rock midden. Researchers have been able to date the midden at Honey Creek, used to bake native plants, to having evolved between 1110 and 1700 AD, and is the result of an estimated 165 ovens used by hunter-gatherer bands over that six-century period. Texas A&M University archeobotanist Phil Dering identified 14 varieties of local plants in charred remains found. The oldest artifact found at the site is the "Martindale dart point" believed to date to between 5000 and 6000 BC for hunting, but chipped and refashioned in later years to be used as a tool at the midden.

== See also ==
- Honey Creek (Texas)
- List of rivers of Texas
