= Hedwigs Hill, Texas =

- Unincorporated community
- Location within the state of Texas Hedwigs Hill, Texas (the United States)
- Coordinates: 30°39′57″N 99°06′43″W
- Country: United States
- State: Texas
- County: Mason
- Elevation: 1,286 ft (392 m)
- Time zone: UTC-6 (Central (CST))
  - Summer (DST): UTC-5 (CDT)
- Area code: 325
- FIPS code: 48-33056
- GNIS feature ID: 1379918

Hedwigs Hill is an unincorporated farming and ranching community, established in 1853, just off U.S. Highway 87, located 5 miles (8.0 km) south of Art in southern Mason County, Texas, United States. It was settled by the overflow of German settlers from nearby Fredericksburg, among them Christopher Voges and Louis Martin. Martin's mother and daughter were both named Hedwig, and the town is believed to have been named for them.

== Establishment ==
Hedwigs Hill was settled by German settlers Christopher Voges and Louis (Ludwig) Martin, who emigrated to Texas with the Adelsverein groups. Voges arrived at Galveston on January 2, 1846, on the Gesina originally destined to settle in Comal County. Martin disembarked at Galveston on November 23, 1844, from the Johann Detthard, and was with the first settlers of Fredericksburg. In 1853 the Martin family moved 10 miles (16 km) south of what is now Mason, on the banks of the Llano River. The settlement became known as Hedwigs Hill, thought to be named for Martin's mother and daughter, both of whom shared the name Hedwig. John Kline was another early settler, who is thought to have built the dogtrot house later occupied by Louis Martin. In 1971, Martin's home was moved to the National Ranching Heritage Center.

== Post office ==
Louis Martin was the first postmaster of Hedwigs Hill in 1858, succeeded by D.B. Anderson in 1861. His nephew Charles Karl Martin became postmaster on August 21, 1861, after Texas had joined the Confederate States of America. Charles was reappointed postmaster by the Union on April 10, 1866, to service the San Antonio-El Paso Mail. Conrad Gustavus became postmaster on November 23, 1866. The post office was discontinued March 17, 1868. Charles was again appointed postmaster to a re-established post office on May 18, 1874, a position he held until his 1879 death. His widow Anna Mebus Martin took over the postmaster position on December 9, 1879. John Keller became postmaster on June 14, 1899, and held the position until the post office was discontinued on April 15, 1907. Thereafter, the mail was directed to Mason.

== Commerce ==
Both Martin families were farmers and ranchers, engaging in the business of freight transport. On June 16, 1864, on a freight hauling trip to Piedras Negras, Coahuila, Louis Martin and his niece's husband Eugene Frantzen had gold hidden beneath a load of bacon. They were ambushed at Eagle Pass and hanged by deserters from the Confederate States Army.

Anna and Charles Martin ran the community store at Hedwig Hill. When Charles became disabled because of rheumatism, Anna became the business person in the family. She grew the business and branched out into wool, cotton, barbed wire, and cattle. She eventually acquired 50,000 acres in Mason, Llano and Gillespie Counties, at the time making her one of the wealthiest Texans of German ancestry. Martin established the Commercial Bank of Mason in 1901, which she ran with her two sons for 24 years. Anna Martin died on July 10, 1925, and is buried in the family cemetery at Hedwig's Hill.

== Churches and school ==
In 1870, a Methodist Episcopal church became the first church in the area, later joined by Art Methodist Church and Hilda Methodist Church. The Louis Martin family was Catholic and often held services in their home.

Hedwig Hill had a school in the district from the late 1800s to early 1900s.

== Later years ==
The Hedwig population began a decline in the early 1900s, dwindling to a population of 10 in the 1950s. By the year 2000, the population had rebounded to 74.

== Climate ==
The climate in this area is characterized by hot, humid summers and generally mild to cool winters. According to the Köppen climate classification system, Hedwigs Hill has a humid subtropical climate, Cfa on climate maps.
