= Pontotoc, Texas =

- Unincorporated community
- Location within the state of Texas Pontotoc, Texas (the United States)
- Coordinates: 30°54′34″N 98°58′48″W
- Country: United States
- State: Texas
- County: Mason
- Elevation: 1,558 ft (475 m)

Population (as of 1990)
  - Total: 125 per Handbook of Texas
- Time zone: UTC-6 (Central (CST))
  - Summer (DST): UTC-5 (CDT)
- ZIP code: 76869
- Area code: 325
- FIPS code: 48-58700
- GNIS feature ID: 1365563

Pontotoc is an unincorporated community on Pontotoc Creek in northeastern Mason County, Texas, United States. The community is located at the junction of State Highway 71 and Ranch to Market Road 501.

== Settlement ==
M. Robert Kidd, proprietor of the first general store, and originally from Pontotoc, Mississippi, is said to have given the community and the creek their names. In 1859, Benjamin J. Willis was one of the first settlers in this community, that historically was a junction of roads leading to San Saba from Fort Mason and from Llano. A few other families arrived in the same period, establishing the community by 1878. Pontotoc included a hotel, general stores, mills, and businesses related to the horse industry. Agriculture products, mainly cotton and pecans, helped support a community economy that included wool and cattle.

Pontotoc fell victim to a typhoid epidemic in 1887 of such severity that it caused the establishment of a second cemetery to serve the community's needs.

In 1890, a move was made to found a new county called Mineral County out of parts of McCulloch, Mason, San Saba, and Llano Counties, with Pontotoc as the county seat. Mason residents petitioned and were able to stop the movement. Various efforts to bring a railroad through Pontotoc also failed.

== Post office ==
Benjamin J Willis was appointed postmaster when Pontotoc received its post office on January 5, 1880.

== Pontotoc and San Fernando Academy ==
In 1972, Recorded Texas Historic Landmark number 11294 was designated to acknowledge the 1883 establishment of the Pontotoc and San Fernando Academy. At its peak, the school had a student body enrollment of 200 for generalized education or achievement of teaching certificates. The principals were K. T. Hamilton and W. C. Roaten. With so much of the population decimated by the typhoid epidemic, the school went under in 1889. It was sold to the Pontotoc public school system, which used the academy as a public school until 1927. The ruins of the academy collapsed into rubble during a storm in 2016. The closing of the academy affected the local economy and was a factor in the decline of the population.

== 20th and 21st centuries ==
Pontotoc had a local newspaper in 1906 and received its first telephone in 1914. A mica mining operation was begun in 1924. In 1941, Pontotoc had seven businesses. In 1947, a fire that began in the local theater swept through the town. Some of the structures were rebuilt, but the burned-out shells of the others stand today. Now, Pontotoc is a rural community with a small population.

It was the birthplace of US Air Force General Ira C. Eaker.

== Climate ==
The climate in this area is characterized by hot, humid summers and generally mild to cool winters. According to the Köppen climate classification, Pontotoc has a humid subtropical climate, Cfa on climate maps.
