= Honey Creek (Texas) =

Honey Creek is a common geographical place name given to multiple locales, structures and bodies of water within the U.S. state of Texas. Several counties have more than one Honey Creek place name within their boundaries. Comal County has six Honey Creek place names that include Honey Creek State Natural Area and the Honey Creek State Natural Area Trail, and also Honey Creek Spring, the community of Honey Creek, the Honey Creek stream, and Honey Creek Cemetery. In addition to Comal, the counties of Bandera, Hamilton and Llano have cemeteries with that name.. Bandera, Kerr and Mason counties each have a Honey Creek Ranch. In Mason County, the Honey Creek stream is an historic archaeological site. Hunt County has Honey Creek Church on its Honey Creek stream.

Honey Creek place names in Texas
Name	USGS ID	Class	County	Coordinates	Elevation	Refs
Honey Creek Cemetery	1359503	Cemetery	Bandera	29°52′04″N 99°25′06″W	1,798 feet (548 m)	
Honey Creek Ranch	1359506	Locale	Bandera	29°51′51″N 99°25′23″W	1,834 feet (559 m)	
Honey Creek	1374129	Stream	Bandera	29°52′01″N 99°25′14″W	1,788 feet (545 m)	
Honey Creek	1359497	Stream	Burnet	30°40′38″N 98°14′38″W	1,033 feet (315 m)	
Honey Creek	1338019	Stream	Coleman	32°02′56″N 99°37′17″W	1,781 feet (543 m)	
Honey Creek	1374130	Stream	Collin	33°14′37″N 98°36′41″W	541 feet (165 m)	
Honey Creek	1359494	Stream	Comal	29°51′58″N 98°28′38″W	1,014 feet (309 m)	
Honey Creek Cemetery	1359502	Cemetery	Comal	29°50′10″N 98°30′25″W	1,237 feet (377 m)	
Honey Creek	1379952	Populated Place	Comal	29°48′19″N 98°30′04″W	1,394 feet (425 m)	
Honey Creek Spring	1998673	Spring	Comal	29°50′31″N 98°30′31″W	1,214 feet (370 m)	
Honey Creek State Natural Area	2029135	Park	Comal	29°51′16″N 98°29′40″W	1,175 feet (358 m)	
Honey Creek State Natural Area Trail	2033551	Trail	Comal			
Honey Creek	1359499	Stream	Coryell	31°30′29″N 97°53′42″W	856 feet (261 m)	
Honey Creek	1359500	Stream	Delta	33°18′11″N 95°44′04″W	413 feet (126 m)	
Honey Grove Creek	1382020	Stream	Fannin	33°42′57″N 95°58′12″W	482 feet (147 m)	
Honey Creek	1338017	Stream	Gillespie	30°17′28″N 98°56′40″W	1,726 feet (526 m)	
Honey Creek	1359492	Stream	Grimes	30°27′38″N 96°00′52″W	220 feet (67 m)	
Honey Creek	1338018	Stream	Hamilton	31°57′06″N 97°59′34″W	945 feet (288 m)	
Honey Creek Cemetery	1338022	Cemetery	Hamilton	31°55′02″N 98°07′15″W	1,201 feet (366 m)	
Honey Creek	1359493	Stream	Hunt	33°15′25″N 96°02′16″W	518 feet (158 m)	
Honey Creek Church	1359505	Church	Hunt	33°17′33″N 96°05′35″W	638 feet (194 m)	
Honey Creek	1338016	Stream	Kerr	30°04′52″N 99°21′08″W	1,759 feet (536 m)	
Honey Creek Ranch	1338023	Locale	Kerr	30°04′55″N 99°21′12″W	1,778 feet (542 m)	
Honey Creek	1359501	Stream	Knox	33°40′52″N 99°56′37″W	1,401 feet (427 m)	
Honey Creek	1338012	Stream	Lavaca	29°30′04″N 96°48′19″W	187 feet (57 m)	
Honey Creek	1359496	Stream	Llano	30°39′43″N 98°29′18″W	827 feet (252 m)	
Honey Creek Cemetery	1359504	Cemetery	Llano	30°37′52″N 98°33′20″W	1,099 feet (335 m)	
Honey Creek	1359495	Stream	Mason	30°38′57″N 99°18′45″W	1,345 feet (410 m)	
Honey Creek Ranch		Locale	Mason			
Honey Creek	1338020	Stream	Palo Pinto	32°39′21″N 98°22′01″W	951 feet (290 m)	
Honey Creek	1359498	Stream	San Saba	31°08′16″N 99°00′01″W	1,355 feet (413 m)	
Honey Creek	1338013	Stream	Travis	30°20′12″N 97°56′03″W	482 feet (147 m)	
Honey Creek	1338021	Stream	Upshur	34°42′50″N 95°11′05″W	354 feet (108 m)	
Honey Creek	1338015	Stream	Uvalde	29°32′45″N 99°51′00″W	1,512 feet (461 m)	
Honey Creek	1338014	Stream	Wood	32°53′01″N 95°25′40″W	400 feet (122 m)	
