= Grit, Texas =

- Unincorporated community
- Location within the state of Texas Grit, Texas (the United States)
- Coordinates: 30°47′00″N 99°19′12″W
- Country: United States
- State: Texas
- County: Mason
- Elevation: 1,716 ft (523 m)

Population (2000)
  - Total: 30
- Time zone: UTC-6 (Central (CST))
  - Summer (DST): UTC-5 (CDT)
- Area code: 319
- FIPS code: 48-31244
- GNIS feature ID: 1358458

Grit is an unincorporated farming and ranching community established ca.1889 in Mason County, in the U.S. state of Texas. The initial settlers considered naming the community after Congressional Medal of Honor recipient Frederick Funston, but a Funston, Texas already existed in Jones County and there was concern of postal delivery confusion. Grit was still populated as of the year 2000.

The town is located on Texas State Highway 29, 6 miles (9.7 km) northwest of Mason, near Honey Creek. In its early years, Grit was centered around the cotton industry, and once had its own cotton gin. While never having a large population, the community did have a school, store, and church. The prevailing theory of the town's name is that it reflects the quality of the area soil. Grit received a post office in 1901, which remained active until 1980.

== See also ==
- Fort Mason
- Texas Hill Country
