= Mason County Courthouse (Texas) =

- U.S. Historic district – Contributing property
- Texas State Antiquities Landmark
- Recorded Texas Historic Landmark
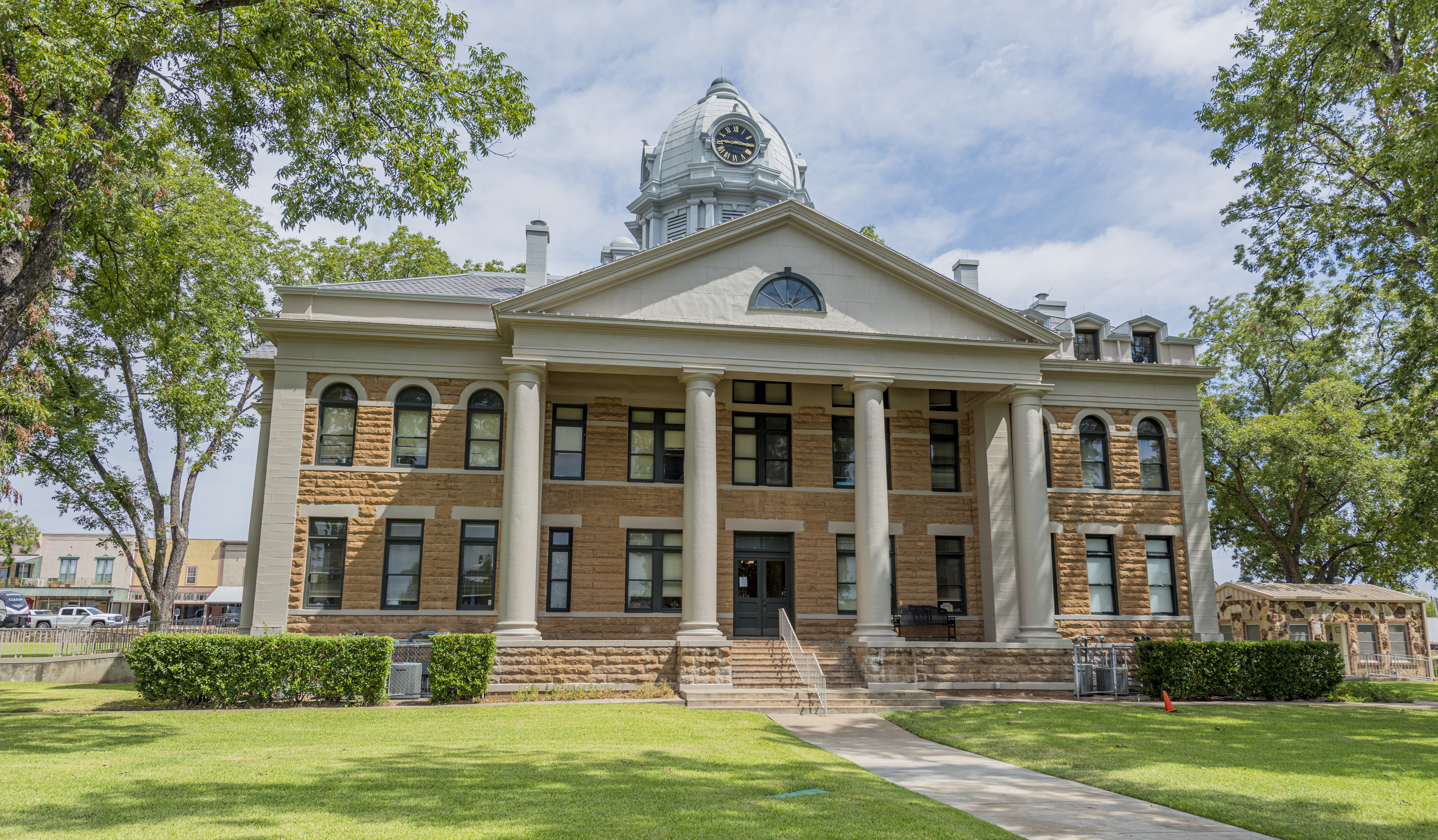
- Mason County Courthouse

- Location within Texas Location within the United States
- Interactive map showing the location of Mason County Courthouse
- Location: Courthouse square, Mason, Texas
- Coordinates: 30°44′54″N 99°13′55″W
- Built: 1909-1910
- Architect: Edward Columbus Hosford
- Architectural style: Classical Revival
- Part of: Mason Historic District (ID74002086)
- TSAL No.: 8200000457
- RTHL No.: 11286

Significant dates
- Added to NRHP: September 17, 1974
- Designated TSAL: January 1, 1992
- Designated RTHL: 1988

The Mason County Courthouse is an historic courthouse building located in Mason, Texas. Built in 1909 to 1910 at a cost of $39,786, it was designed by Georgia-born American architect Edward Columbus Hosford, who is noted for the courthouses and other buildings that he designed in Florida, Georgia and Texas. Mutual Construction Company of Louisville, Kentucky built it of Fredericksburg granite and rusticated stone. There are gable front porticoes on all four sides, each or which is supported by four 2-story Doric columns.

The building is a contributing property in the Mason Historic District which was added to the National Register of Historic Places on September 17, 1974.

The courthouse was razed by an arsonist's fire on the evening of February 4, 2021. The stone exterior was all that remained following the fire. At the time of the fire, the county records had been temporarily relocated to another location to facilitate future renovations to the building, restored mostly to its original glory. The courthouse reopened in 2024 after extensive renovations.

== See also ==
- National Register of Historic Places listings in Mason County, Texas
- Recorded Texas Historic Landmarks in Mason County
- List of county courthouses in Texas
- Glasscock County Courthouse, also designed by Hosford.
