= Gene Zesch =

American sculptor (born 1932)

Gene Zesch is an American sculptor, who gained national recognition in the 1960s when prominent figures such as Lyndon B. Johnson and John Connally started collecting his woodcarvings. Born in 1932, he grew up on a Texas ranch in Mason County and also ranched in Durango, Mexico. Mr. Zesch started working as an artist in 1954 and has made a living out of carving caricature figurines of Texas cowboys and cattlemen. The characteristic expression of the subjects of his work is an eyed rolling resignation. He still lives in Mason County on his family ranch. He hand paints bronze castings of his more notable carvings and sells signed prints of photos of his work. Mr. Zesch's work has been featured in one-man shows at the National Cowboy & Western Heritage Museum (2005), the Institute of Texan Cultures (1988), the Witte Museum (1967), and the Forsyth Gallery at his alma mater, Texas A&M University (1997). His work has also been displayed in special exhibits at the Smithsonian Institution’s National Portrait Gallery (United States) (1993), the Museum of Western Art (2004), and HemisFair '68 (1968).
