= Louis Martin (settler) =

- Born: Ludwig Martin; November 25, 1820; Erndtebrück North Rhine-Westphalia, Germany
- Died: June 16, 1864 (aged 43); Eagle Pass, Texas, United States
- Cause of death: Murder
- Resting place: Der Stadt Friedhof
- Citizenship: American
- Known for: First sheriff Gillespie Co. District Clerk Gillespie Co. Co-founder Hedwigs Hill, Mason County, Texas
- Spouse: Elisabet Arhelger
- Children: Eight

Ludwig "Louis" Martin (November 11, 1820 – June 16, 1864) was with the first settlers to Fredericksburg, Texas. He was the first sheriff of Gillespie County, and also served as District Clerk of the county. Martin was a co-founder of the Mason County community of Hedwigs Hill.

== Early years ==
Ludwig Martin was born November 25, 1820, in Erndtebrück North Rhine-Westphalia, Germany, to Nicholas Martin and his wife Hedwig Sinner Martin.

== Texas ==
=== New Braunfels and Fredericksburg ===
Martin emigrated to Texas with the first wave of Adelsverein settlers. He disembarked at Galveston on November 23, 1844, from the Johann Detthard After living in New Braunfels, he moved to Fredericksburg when John O. Meusebach opened up the area to settlements.

In 1847, Martin had Town Lot 311. He was one of the 1847 signers of the petition to create Gillespie County. Martin was the first sheriff of Gillespie County. He became District Clerk in 1850. Martin engaged in farming and ranching, while also selling livestock forage and supplies to area settlers. He ran a freight business that serviced Fort Martin Scott and other military installations. Martin was in the livelihood of buying and selling land during this period.

=== Hedwigs Hill ===
In 1853 the Martin family moved ten miles south of what is now Mason, on the banks of the Llano River. The settlement became known as Hedwigs Hill, thought to be named for his mother and daughter. Martin was the first postmaster of Hedwigs Hill. His nephew Charles Martin became postmaster three times, being succeeded by Charles' wife Anna Mebus Martin in 1879. From 1861–1862, Martin served as Justice of the Peace of Mason County. During 1861, he saw service under Captain Alf Hunter and the Mason Minutemen. During his life at Hedwig Hill, Martin continued the business endeavors he had in Gillespie County, in addition to hauling cotton to Mexico.

== Civil War and death ==
On June 16, 1864, on a freight hauling trip to Piedras Negras, Coahuila, Martin and his niece's husband Eugene Frantzen had gold hidden beneath a load of bacon. They were ambushed at Eagle Pass and hanged by deserters from the Confederate States Army. His wife was informed of the incident and recovered the bodies. When she moved back to Fredericksburg, she had the bodies buried in a common grave in Der Stadt Friedhof. In 1971, Martin's home was moved to the National Ranching Heritage Center.

== Personal life ==
Martin married Elisabet Arhelger. She emigrated with her family from Rittershausen, on the Hershel October 16, 1845. The family was of the Catholic faith, and services were sometimes held in their home. The couple had eight children. Their daughter Hedwig was the first white child born in Fredericksburg.

== Source material ==
- Sassmannshausen, Andreas (2009). Von Wittgenstein nach Texas – der erste Sheriff kam aus Erndtebrück. Zeitschrift Wittgenstein, Blätter des Wittgensteiner Heimatvereins e.V.
- Pioneers in God's Hills. Gillespie County Historical Society. 1960.
- King, Irene Marschall (1967). John O.Meusebach. University of Texas Press. ISBN 978-0-292-73656-6.
- "Immigration Database". Galveston Historical Foundation.
- "Indianola Immigrant Database". Victoria Tx Regional History Center. Archived from the original on 2010-11-25.
