= National Register of Historic Places listings in Mason County, Texas =

Location of Mason County in Texas

This is a list of the National Register of Historic Places listings in Mason County, Texas.

This is intended to be a complete list of properties and districts listed on the National Register of Historic Places in Mason County, Texas. There are one district and three individual properties listed on the National Register in the county. The district contains one individually listed property, one State Antiquities Landmark and several Recorded Texas Historic Landmarks.

This National Park Service list is complete through NPS recent listings posted March 21, 2025.

== Current listings ==
The locations of National Register properties and districts may be seen in a mapping service provided.

	Name on the Register	Image	Date listed	Location	City or town	Description
1	Heinrich and Fredericka Hasse House	Heinrich and Fredericka Hasse House	March 14, 1990 (#90000336)	TX 29, W of Art; 30°44′21″N 99°07′16″W	Art	
2	Mason Historic District	Mason Historic District	September 17, 1974 (#74002086)	Irregular pattern along both sides of U.S. 87 and TX 29; 30°44′56″N 99°13′27″W	Mason	Boundary increase on Oct. 16, 1991 (#91001526); includes State Antiquities Landmark and numerous Recorded Texas Historic Landmarks
3	Reynolds-Seaquist House	Reynolds-Seaquist House	November 20, 1974 (#74002087)	400 Broad St. 30°45′05″N 99°13′54″W	Mason	Recorded Texas Historic Landmark; part of Mason Historic District NRHP PDF
4	State Highway 9 Bridge at the Llano River	State Highway 9 Bridge at the Llano River	October 10, 1996 (#96001128)	US 87, 10 mi (16 km). S of TX 29; 30°39′40″N 99°06′34″W	Mason	Funded by the New Deal program under President Franklin Roosevelt

.

== See also ==
- National Register of Historic Places listings in Texas
- Recorded Texas Historic Landmarks in Mason County
