= Mason Historic District =

Historic district in Texas, United States

- U.S. National Register of Historic Places
- U.S. Historic district
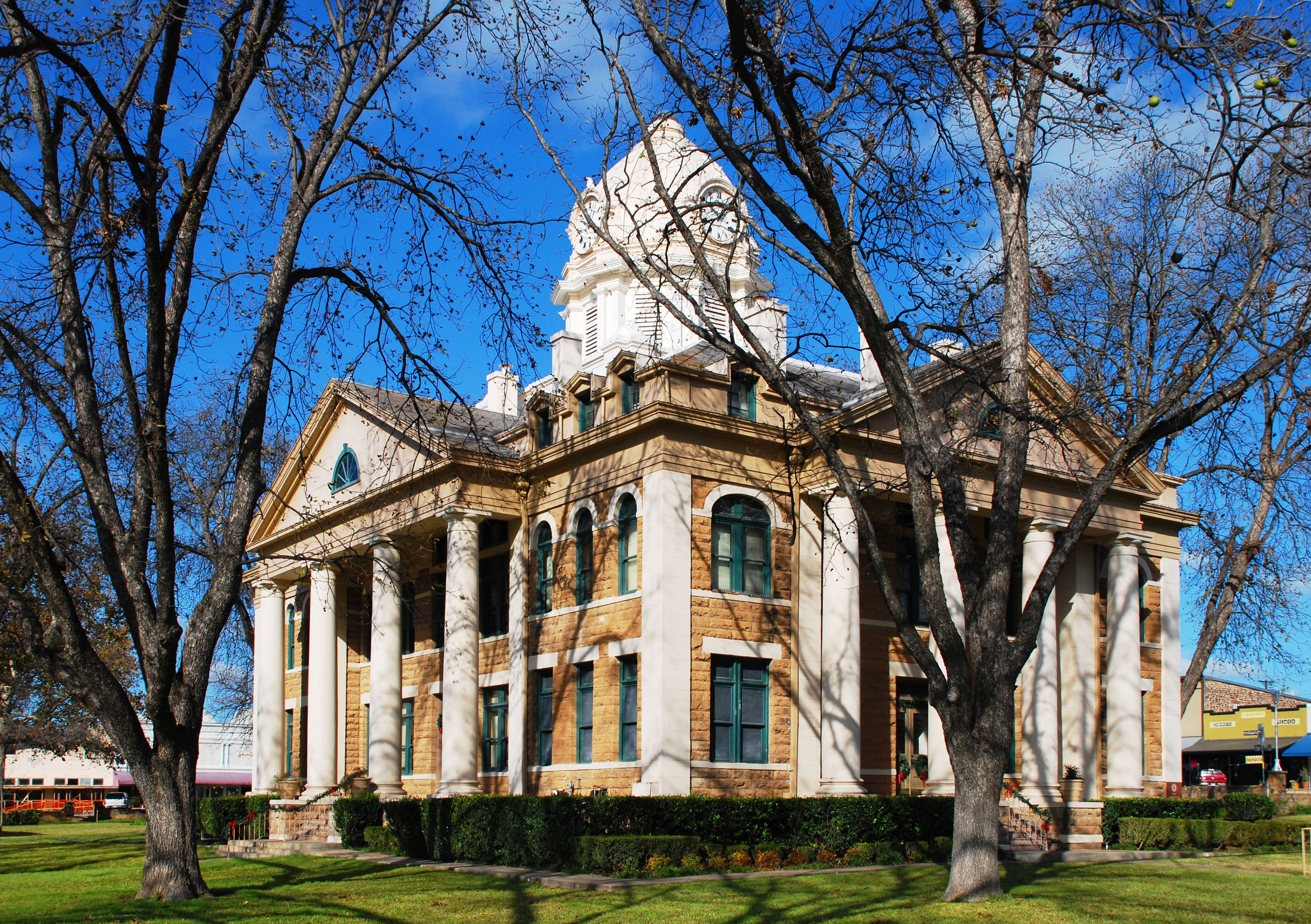
- Mason County Courthouse

- Location within Texas Location within the United States
- Location: Irregular pattern along both sides of U.S. 87 and TX 29, Mason, Texas (original); Roughly, Post Hill Rd. from College Ave. to Spruce St. (increase)
- Coordinates: 30.748889°N 99.224167°W
- Area: 230 acres (0.93 km^{2}) (original); 20 acres (0.081 km^{2}) (increase)
- Built: 1869
- Architect: Multiple
- Architectural style: Classical Revival, Second Empire, Gothic Revival, Bungalow/Craftsman, Tudor Revival
- NRHP reference No.: 74002086 (original); 91001526 (increase)

Significant dates
- Added to NRHP: September 17, 1974
- Boundary increase: October 16, 1991

The Mason Historic District in Mason, Texas is listed on the National Register of Historic Places. It was listed in 1974 and increased in 1991. The original district was 230 acres (0.93 km^{2}) forming an irregular pattern along both sides of U.S. 87 and TX 29 which included 186 contributing buildings and six contributing structures. The increase added 14 contributing building and a contributing site on 20 acres (0.081 km^{2}) roughly along Post Hill Rd. from College Ave. to Spruce St.

It includes the Mason County Courthouse.

It includes the local Odeon Theater as a contributing building. In 2017, the theater claims it is the oldest operating theater in West Texas.

It includes:

- Reynolds/Seaquist House (1887 & 1891), a three-story sandstone house built first as a two-story stone house, later enlarged with Richard Grosse as architect/builder
- Mason House (c.1876), a two-story vernacular structure which was one of earliest hotels in Mason and served as a stage stop on the San Antonio to El Paso mail route; was an apartment house in 1974.
- St. Paul's Lutheran Church (1904), a cruciform Gothic Revival church
- James E. Ranck Building (1874), the oldest sandstone commercial building surviving in Mason; housed the telegraph office during 1870s.

== See also ==
- National Register of Historic Places listings in Mason County, Texas
