= Homesite of John O. Meusebach =

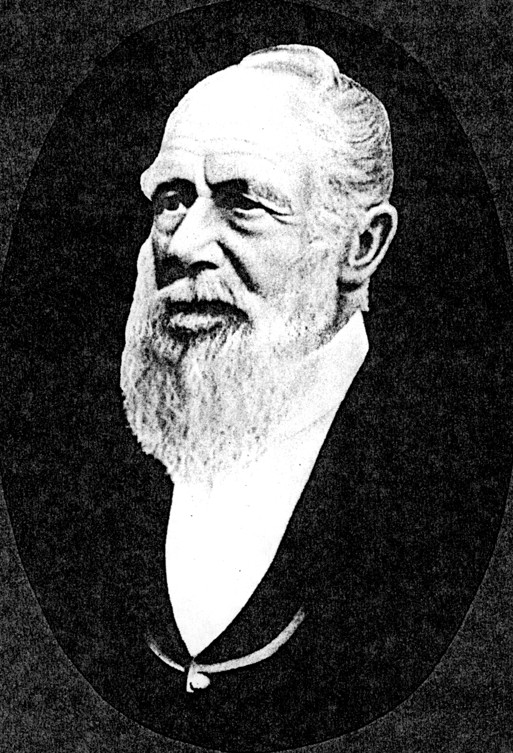
- John O Meusebach

- Location within the state of Texas
- Coordinates: 30°35′00″N 99°00′07″W
- Country: United States
- State: Texas
- County: Mason
- Elevation: 1,522 ft (464 m)
- Time zone: UTC-6 (Central (CST))
  - Summer (DST): UTC-5 (CDT)
- Area code: 325
- FIPS code: 48
- GNIS feature ID

The Homesite of John O. Meusebach is located at Loyal Valley in Mason County, Texas, 21 miles (34 km) north of Fredericksburg and 18 miles (29 km) southeast of the city of Mason, on U.S. Highway 87 to right-of-way at the intersection of US 87 and RM 2242. Meusebach moved to the property in 1869, after a tornado destroyed his family home in Comal County.

Meusebach was born in Dillenburg, Duchy of Nassau. He had a background in botany, and was educated and trained as a lawyer. As Commissioner-General of the Adelsverein, he founded the city of Fredericksburg, and opened up the Fisher–Miller Land Grant territory to settlement when he brokered the Meusebach–Comanche Treaty. He later served as Texas State Senator District 22. His Loyal Valley homesite was designated a Recorded Texas Historic Landmark in 1969, Marker number 11288.

== New Braunfels tornado ==
On September 12, 1869 a tornado destroyed the Meusebach home in New Braunfels. Meusebach, whose foot had been pinned beneath a heavy beam, was the only member of his family to be injured. The foot injury remained with him the rest of his life.

== Loyal Valley ==
After the 1869 tornado, Meusebach purchased seven hundred acres 21 miles (34 km) north of Fredericksburg and 18 miles (29 km) southeast of Mason, on U.S. Highway 87 to right-of-way at the intersection of US 87 and RR 2242. He named the area Loyal Valley to reflect his sentiments about the Union during the Civil War. A trip to Fredericksburg was half a day's ride, and a trip to New Braunfels took about two days. Ferdinand Lindheimer was a frequent visitor who exchanged botanical specimens with Meusebach for evaluation.

Charles Henry Nimitz, grandfather of Fleet Admiral Chester Nimitz, made a special visit to the Loyal Valley residence. Nimitz later gave an interview about the visit to the Fredericksburg newspaper Das Wochenblatt, detailing the orchards and gardens Meusebach had cultivated.

His wife Agnes and children stayed in New Braunfels until 1875, to benefit from the New Braunfels school system. At Loyal Valley, he built a native limestone home. Outside his home beneath a privacy trellis, he built a Roman style bathtub out of limestone and cement. On his acreage he indulged in his love of horticulture by maintaining an orchard, ornamental shrubs and a personal rose garden.

Meusebach opened a mercantile establishment that evolved into a stage stop and the area's community gathering place, where he survived a gunshot wound to the leg, inflicted by trouble makers during the Mason County Hoo Doo War. Meusebach was appointed justice of the peace, notary public and served as the community’s second postmaster in 1873. The family's home was destroyed by fire in 1886, and Meusebach built a new one.

== Death ==
Meusebach died on May 27, 1897, on his property in Loyal Valley, and is buried in the family cemetery in Cherry Spring.
