= Anna Mebus Martin =

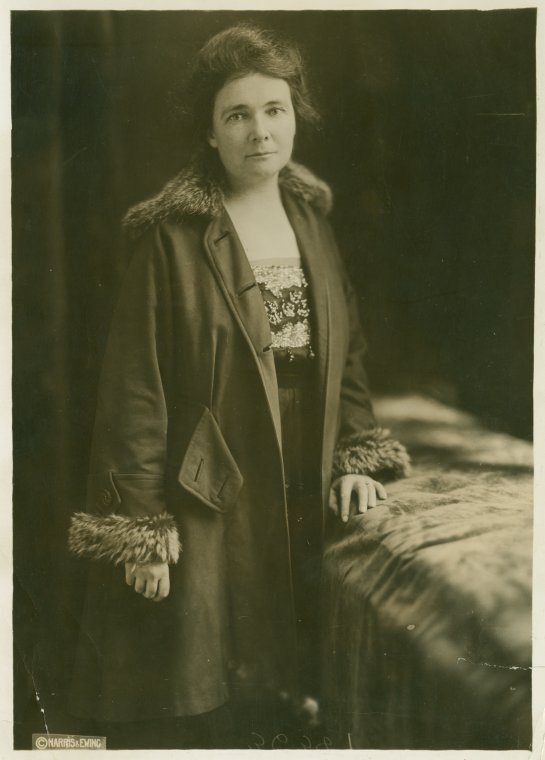
- Born: Anna Henriette Mebus; December 10, 1843; Germany
- Died: July 10, 1925 (aged 81); Mason County, Texas, United States
- Resting place: Martin Family Cemetery; Mason County, Texas
- Known for: Pres.Commercial Bank Mason; Rancher; Business woman
- Spouse: Charles Karl Martin
- Children: Max; Charles
- Parent(s): Hewill Mebus; Henriette Martin

Anna Henriette Mebus Martin (1843–1925) was a German-American Texas rancher and business woman. She rose from poverty to become one of the wealthiest Texans of German ancestry in her time. She chartered the Commercial Bank of Mason in 1901, and served as its president for twenty-four years. In 1986, Recorded Texas Historic Landmark 11270 was placed at the bank, acknowledging the contributions of Anna Mebus Martin and her family.

== Early life ==
Anna Henriette Mebus Martin was born December 10, 1843, near Cologne, Germany to Hewill Mebus and his wife Henriette Martin Mebus. She was the oldest of six children. Hewill Mebus lost his Solingen-based business in 1858, and the family made the decision to emigrate to Texas, where Henrietta Mebus's relatives resided. The family sailed from Germany on September 24, 1858, disembarking from the ship Iris in Galveston on December 7, 1858.

== Texas ==
The Mebus family settled at Hedwigs Hill in Mason County with Henriette's brother Louis (Ludwig) Martin. They engaged in the family business of farming and ranching. A year later, Anna Mebus married her cousin Charles Karl Martin, who ran a local store.

Charles Karl Martin became postmaster on August 21, 1861, after Texas had joined the Confederate States of America. He contracted rheumatism and was an invalid by 1864. During the American Civil War, he lost the store. Anna borrowed $150 for basic staples and re-opened the store. Charles was re-appointed postmaster by the Union on April 10, 1866, to service the San Antonio–El Paso mail. The post office was discontinued March 17, 1868. Charles was again appointed postmaster to a re-established post office on May 18, 1874, a position he held until his 1879 death. Henriette Mebus also died the same year of 1879.

Anna Martin became postmaster on December 9, 1879. When the store began to serve as a stage stop, Martin seized on the wayfarer trade by boarding horses, as well as selling homemade butter, groceries, and her own sewn creations. She bartered dry goods for cattle, preferring to cut out the middle man. Like her uncle Louis, Martin dealt in the freight business. She became a successful wool and cotton dealer. Martin was the first person in Mason County to deal in barbed wire, selling more than any other west Texas firm at the time. She eventually acquired 50,000 acres in Mason, Llano and Gillespie counties, at the time making her one of the wealthiest Texans of German ancestry.

Martin established the Commercial Bank of Mason in 1901, which she ran with her two sons for twenty-four years. In 1986, Recorded Texas Historic Landmark 11270 was placed at the bank, acknowledging the contributions of Anna Mebus Martin and her family.

Martin once summed it up:

I heard men say, o, she is only a woman, but I showed them what a woman could do.

== Personal life and death ==
In December 1859 Anna married her cousin Charles Karl Martin, nephew of Louis Martin. The couple had two sons, Max and Charles. Anna Martin died on July 10, 1925, and is buried in the family cemetery at Hedwigs Hill.

In 2011, Martin was inducted into the National Cowgirl Museum and Hall of Fame.

== Source material ==
- "Immigration Database". Galveston Historical Foundation.
- "Indianola Immigrant Database". Victoria Tx Regional History Center. Archived from the original on 2010-11-25.
