= Ira C. Eaker =

US Air Force general (1896–1987)

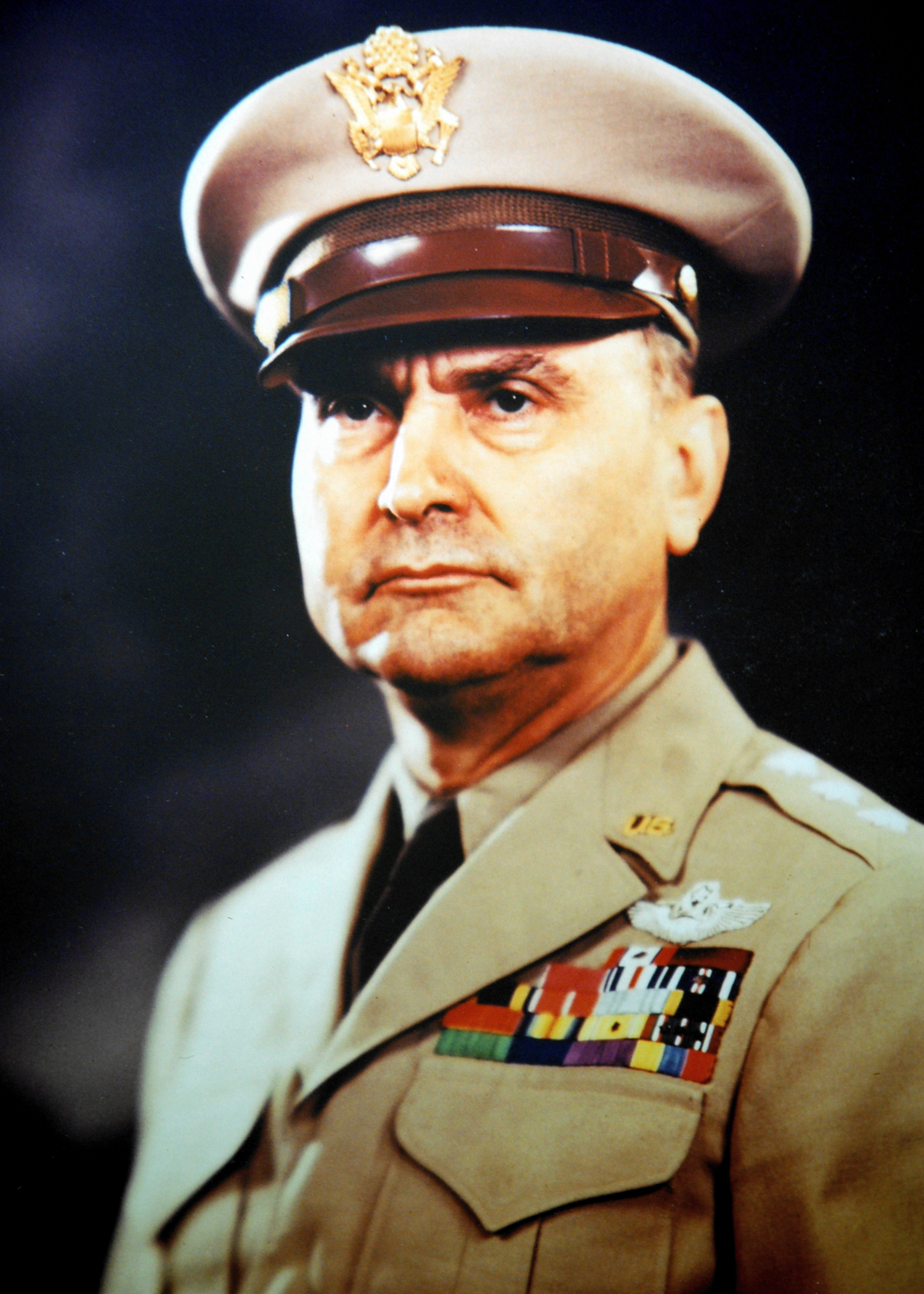
- Born: Ira Clarence Eaker; April 13, 1896; Field Creek, Texas, U.S.
- Died: August 6, 1987 (aged 91); Andrews AFB, Maryland, U.S.
- Burial place: Arlington National Cemetery
- Military career
- Allegiance: United States
- Branch: United States Army; Army Infantry; Army Air Service; Army Air Corps; Army Air Forces
- Service years: 1917–1947
- Rank: General (honorary)
- Commands: Eighth Air Force
- Conflicts: World War I World War II
- Awards: Air Force Distinguished Service Medal; Army Distinguished Service Medal (3); Navy Distinguished Service Medal; Silver Star; Legion of Merit; Distinguished Flying Cross (2); Air Medal; Congressional Gold Medal
- Other work: Vice-President of Hughes Aircraft (1947–1957) and Douglas Aircraft (1957–1961)

Lieutenant General Ira Clarence Eaker KCB KBE (April 13, 1896 – August 6, 1987) was a general of the United States Army Air Forces during World War II. Eaker, as second-in-command of the prospective Eighth Air Force, was sent to England to form and organize its bomber command. While he struggled to build up airpower in England, the organization of the Army Air Forces evolved and he was named commander of the Eighth Air Force on December 1, 1942.

Although his background was in single-engine fighter aircraft, Eaker became the architect of a strategic bombing force that ultimately numbered forty groups of 60 heavy bombers each, supported by a subordinate fighter command of 1,500 aircraft, most of which was in place by the time he relinquished command at the start of 1944. Eaker then took overall command of four Allied air forces based in the Mediterranean Theater of Operations, and by the end of World War II had been named Deputy Commander of the U.S. Army Air Forces. He worked in the aerospace industry following his retirement from the military, then became a newspaper columnist.

== Childhood and education ==
Eaker was born in Field Creek, Texas, in 1896, the son of a Dutch tenant farmer. He attended Southeastern State Teachers College in Durant, Oklahoma, and then joined the United States Army in 1917. He was appointed a second lieutenant of Infantry, Officer's Reserve Corps, and assigned to active duty with the 64th Infantry Regiment at Camp Bliss, El Paso, Texas. The 64th Infantry was assigned to the 14th Infantry Brigade on December 20, 1917, to be part of the 7th Infantry Division when it deployed to France. On November 15, 1917, he received a commission in the Regular Army. He later received a Bachelor of Arts degree in journalism from the University of Southern California in 1934.

== Air Service and Air Corps career ==
Eaker remained with the 64th Infantry until March 1918, when he was placed on detached service to receive flying instruction at Austin and Kelly Fields in Texas. Upon graduation the following October, he was rated a pilot and assigned to Rockwell Field, California.

In July 1919, he transferred to the Philippine Islands, where he served with the 2d Aero Squadron at Fort Mills until September 1919; with the 3d Aero Squadron at Camp Stotsenburg until September 1920, and as executive officer of the Department Air Office, Department and Assistant Department Air Officer, Philippine Department, and in command of the Philippine Air Depot at Manila until September 1921. On July 1, 1920, he was commissioned into the Regular Army as a captain in the Air Service and returned to the United States in January 1922, for duty at Mitchel Field, New York, where he commanded the 5th Aero Squadron and later was post adjutant.

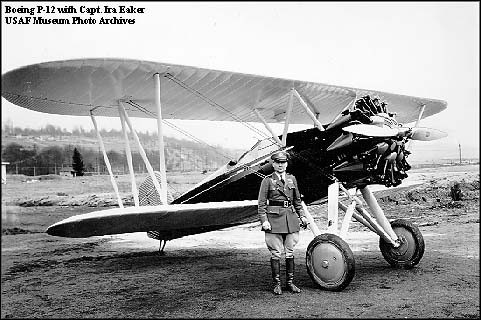
Captain Ira Eaker with a Boeing P-12

In June 1924, Eaker was named executive assistant in the Office of Air Service at Washington, D.C., and from December 21, 1926, to May 2, 1927, he served as a pilot of one of the Loening OA-1 float planes of the Pan American Goodwill Flight that made a 22,000 mile (35,200 km) trip around South America and, with the others, was awarded the Mackay Trophy. He then became executive officer in the Office of the Assistant Secretary of War at Washington, D.C.

In September 1926, he was named operations and line maintenance officer at Bolling Field, Washington, D.C. While on that duty, he participated as chief pilot on the endurance flight of the Army plane, Question Mark, from 1 to January 7, 1929, establishing a new world flight endurance record. For this achievement the entire crew of five, including Eaker and mission commander Major Carl Spaatz, were awarded the DFC. In 1930, he made the first transcontinental flight entirely with instruments.

In October 1934, Eaker was ordered to duty at March Field, Calif., where he commanded the 34th Pursuit Squadron and later the 17th Pursuit Squadron. In the summer of 1935, he was detached for duty with the Navy and participated aboard the aircraft carrier USS Lexington, on maneuvers in Hawaii and Guam.

Eaker entered the Air Corps Tactical School at Maxwell Field, Alabama, in August 1935, and upon graduation the following June entered the Command and General Staff School at Fort Leavenworth, Kansas, from which he graduated in June 1937. During his time at Ft Leavenworth from June 3–7, 1936, Eaker made the first blind (instruments only) transcontinental flight from New York to Los Angeles.

He then became assistant chief of the Information Division in the Office of the Chief of Air Corps (OCAC) at Washington, D.C., during which he helped plan and publicize the interception of the Italian liner Rex at sea. In November 1940, Eaker was given command of the 20th Pursuit Group at Hamilton Field, California. He was promoted in 1941 to colonel while at Hamilton Field.

== World War II ==
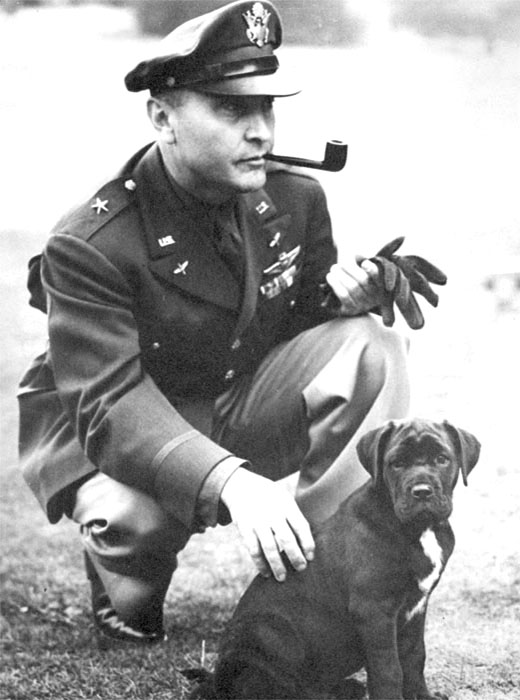
Brigadier General Ira C. Eaker in England

Promoted to brigadier general in January 1942, he was assigned to organize the VIII Bomber Command (which became the Eighth Air Force) in England and to understudy the British system of bomber operations. Then, in December 1942, he assumed command of the Eighth Air Force. In a speech he gave to the British that won him favorable publicity, he said, "We won't do much talking until we've done more fighting. After we've gone, we hope you'll be glad we came."

Much of Eaker's initial staff, including Captain Frederick W. Castle, Captain Beirne Lay, Jr., and Lieutenant Harris Hull, was composed of reserve rather than career military officers, and the group became known as "Eaker's Amateurs". Eaker's position as commander of the Eighth Air Force led to his becoming the model for the fictional Major General Pat Pritchard in the 1949 movie Twelve O'Clock High.

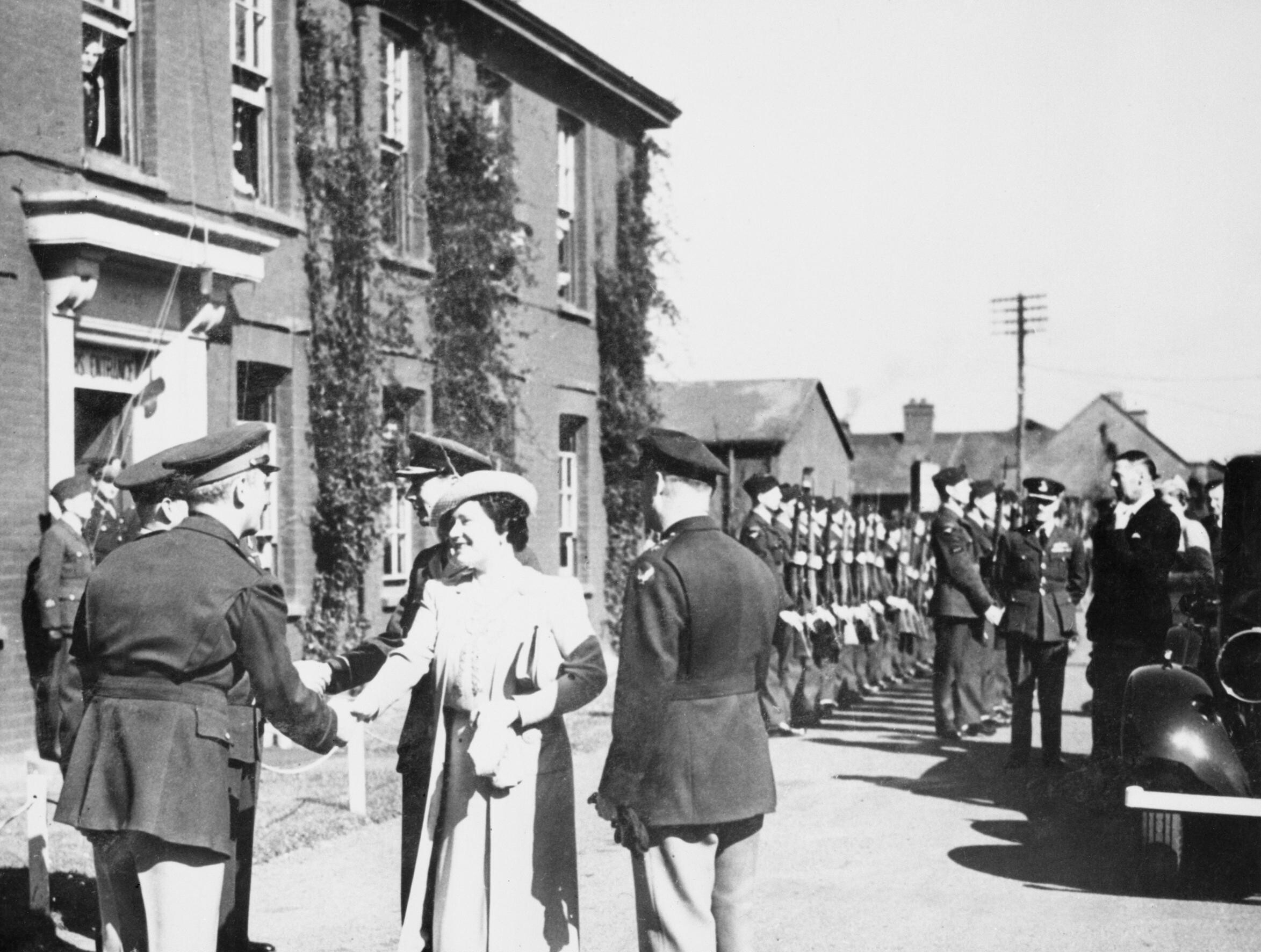
H.M. King George VI and Queen Elizabeth are greeted by Major General Frank Hunter and Major General Ira C. Eaker of the 8th U.S. Army Air Forces on the occasion of their visit to Duxford, Cambridgeshire on 26 May 1943.

Throughout the war, Eaker was an advocate for daylight "precision" bombing of military and industrial targets in German-occupied territory and ultimately Germany—of striking at the enemy's ability to wage war while minimizing civilian casualties. The British considered daylight bombing too risky and wanted the Americans to join them in night raids that would target wider areas, but Eaker persuaded a skeptical Winston Churchill that the American and British approaches complemented each other in a one-page memo that concluded, "If the RAF continues night bombing and we bomb by day, we shall bomb them round the clock and the devil shall get no rest." He personally participated in the first US B-17 Flying Fortress bomber strike against German occupation forces in France, bombing Rouen on August 17, 1942.

Eaker was promoted to major general in September 1943. However, as American bomber losses mounted from German defensive fighter aircraft attacks on deep penetration missions beyond the range of available fighter cover, Eaker may have lost some of the confidence of USAAF Commanding General Henry Arnold. To reduce losses to fighters, Eaker was a strong advocate of the Boeing YB-40 Flying Fortress, a B-17 Flying Fortress which carried additional gun turrets and gunners instead of a bomb load and was intended to act as a long-range, "gunship" escort for conventional bombers. However the YB-40 was not a success in combat.

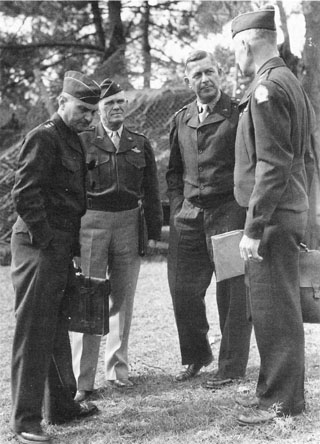
Lieutenant General Ira C. Eaker, Major General John K. Cannon, Lieutenant General Jacob L. Devers, and Major General Thomas B. Larkin, 1944.

Eaker also strongly advocated work on improving the range of escort fighters using drop tanks, so that his Republic P-47 Thunderbolts could stay with the bomber formations for longer periods. Eaker strictly followed the prevailing American doctrine of requiring fighters to stay near the bombers, but this stricture was proving frustrating to the fighter groups, who advocated for free rein in clearing the skies of enemy aircraft ahead of the bomber paths. His air force was bleeding men; from July through November 1943, the 8th lost 64% of its aircrew. When General Dwight D. Eisenhower was named Supreme Allied Commander in December 1943, he proposed to use his existing team of subordinate commanders, including Lieutenant General Jimmy Doolittle, in key positions. Doolittle was named Eighth Air Force Commander, and Arnold concurred with the change. After a rocky start, Doolittle greatly improved on Eaker's record by releasing the American fighter groups to hunt down enemy fighters.

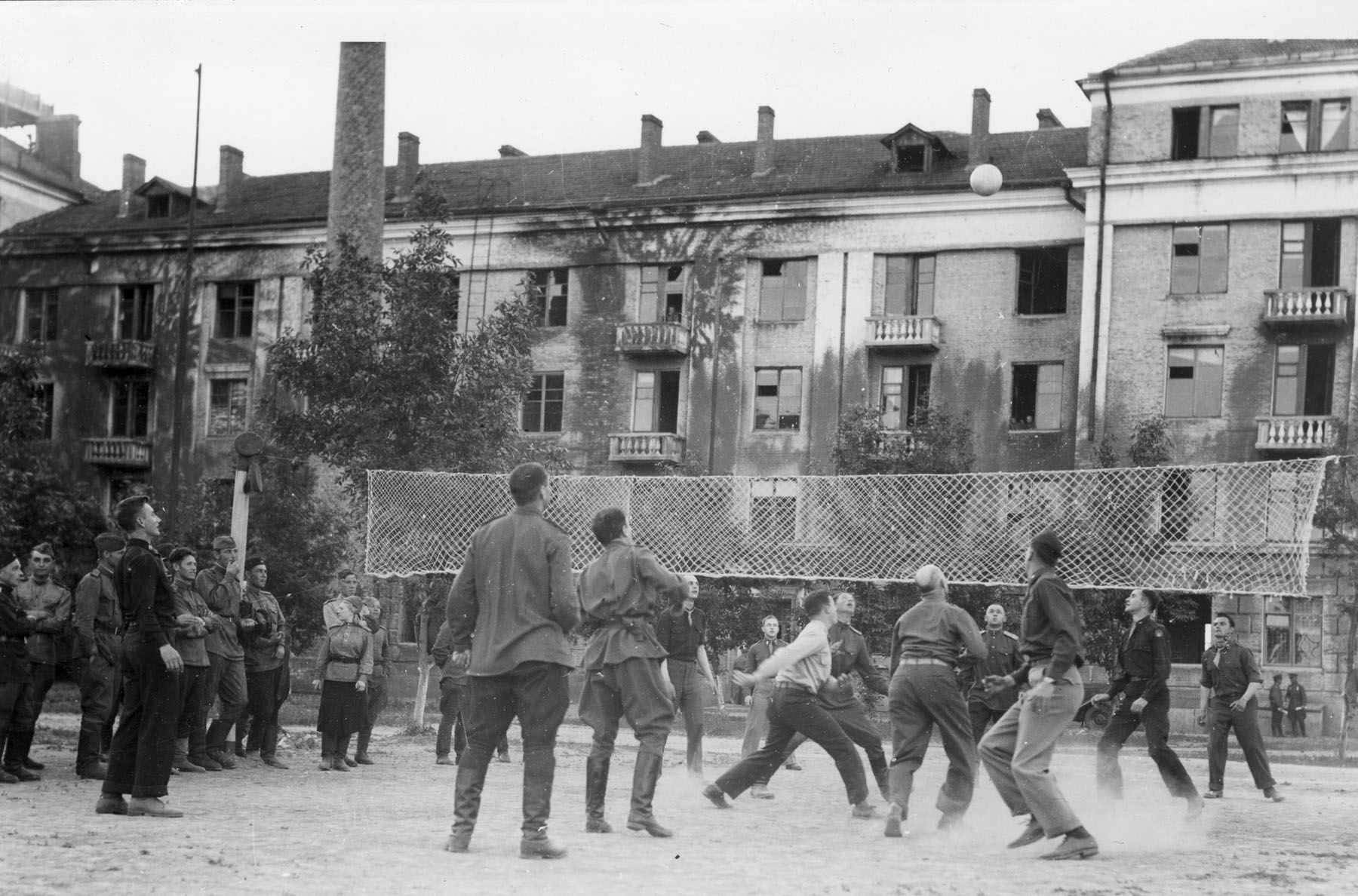
Eaker, fifth from right, playing volleyball with Soviet servicemen in Poltava during Operation Frantic

Eaker was reassigned as Commander-in-Chief of the Mediterranean Allied Air Forces, previous commander Tedder having been selected by Eisenhower to plan the air operations for the Normandy invasion. Eaker had under his command the Twelfth and Fifteenth Air Forces and the British Desert and Balkan Air Forces. He did not approve of the plan to bomb Monte Cassino in February 1944, considering it a dubious military target, but ultimately signed off the mission and gave in to pressure from ground commanders. Historians of the era now generally believe Eaker's skepticism was correct and that the ancient abbey at Monte Cassino could have been preserved without jeopardizing the allied advance through Italy. He personally led the first raid of Operation Frantic on 2 July 1944, flying in a B-17 called Yankee Doodle II and landing at a Soviet base at Poltava in Ukraine.

On April 30, 1945, General Eaker was named deputy commander of the Army Air Forces and Chief of the Air Staff. He retired on August 31, 1947, and was promoted to lieutenant general in the newly established United States Air Force on the retired list June 29, 1948.

Almost 40 years after his retirement, Congress attempted to pass special legislation awarding four-star status in the U.S. Air Force to General Eaker, prompted by retired Air Force Reserve major general and Senator Barry Goldwater (R-AZ). Goldwater had originally wanted to simply promote Jimmy Doolittle to four star rank, but was told by Air Force Secretary Verne Orr that this would put Eaker in an awkward position because he "had greater responsibilities during World War II."

In order to cure this defect the Doolittle promotion was enlarged to include Eaker. Goldwater first proposed a bill of relief that waived both officers' ineligibility for promotion. However, the legislation stalled in the House, which prompted Goldwater to only seek confirmation via the Senate, which was arguably unlawful because of statutory restrictions on general officers that required them to be in active service. On April 26, 1985, Chief of Staff General Charles A. Gabriel and Ruth Eaker, the general's wife, pinned on his fourth star. Later, in 1986, the Comptroller General ruled that the promotion was unlawful for pay or benefit purposes due to the lack of implementing legislation.

== Civilian career ==
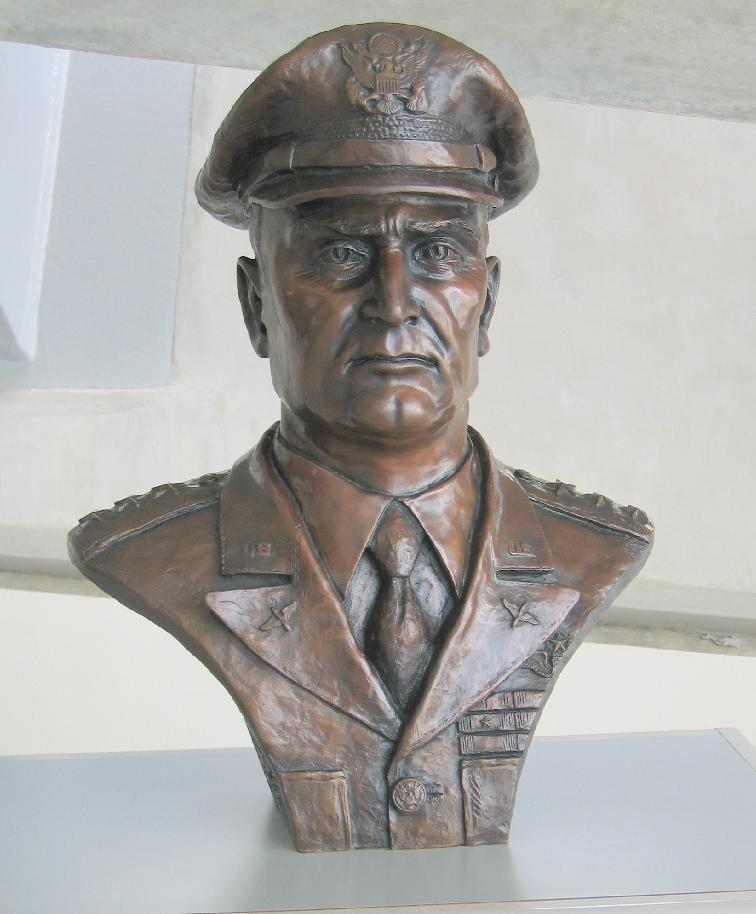
Bust of General Eaker at the Imperial War Museum Duxford

Ten days before the Democratic Party primary runoff election of the 1948 United States Senate election in Texas on Saturday, August 28, 1948, Eaker spoke in support of candidate Lyndon B. Johnson. Coke R. Stevenson's campaign attacked Eaker. Eaker was defended by other prominent military officers and Johnson. Criticizing a prominent military leader so soon after World War II likely had a negative effect on Stevenson's turnout in the election, and in Howard County in particular (which had quartered an Army Air Force Bombardier School during World War II) returned an abnormally high net gain for Johnson as compared to his gains in other areas. Johnson won the election by a small margin.

Eaker was a vice president of Hughes Tool Company and Hughes Aircraft (1947–1957) and of Douglas Aircraft (1957–1961). While stationed in New York in the early 1920s, Eaker studied law at Columbia University. Eaker went back to school in the early 1930s at the University of Southern California and received a degree in journalism. With Henry Arnold, Eaker co-authored This Flying Game (1936), Winged Warfare (1937), and Army Flyer (1942). Starting in 1962, he wrote a weekly column, carried by many newspapers, on military affairs.

Eaker was inducted into the National Aviation Hall of Fame, in Dayton, Ohio, in 1970. Over his 30 years of flying, General Eaker accumulated 12,000 flying hours as pilot.

On September 26, 1978, the U.S. Congress passed, and on October 10, 1978, President Jimmy Carter signed, Public Law 95-438, which awarded the Congressional Gold Medal to General Eaker, "in recognition of his distinguished career as an aviation pioneer and Air Force leader".

== Death and legacy ==
Eaker died August 6, 1987, at Malcolm Grow Medical Center, Andrews Air Force Base, Maryland, and is buried in Arlington National Cemetery.

Blytheville Air Force Base, Strategic Air Command (SAC) installation, was renamed Eaker Air Force Base on May 26, 1988. Eaker AFB was closed on March 6, 1992, due to Base Realignment and Closure (BRAC) action. Military to civilian conversion began, and public aircraft began using the decommissioned base. The military still uses the renamed Arkansas International Airport.

The airport in Durant, Oklahoma was renamed Eaker Field to honor Eaker, a graduate of Southeastern State College in Durant. Now known as Southeastern Oklahoma State University, the student aviation majors use the airport as the home of the flight school.

== Dates of rank ==
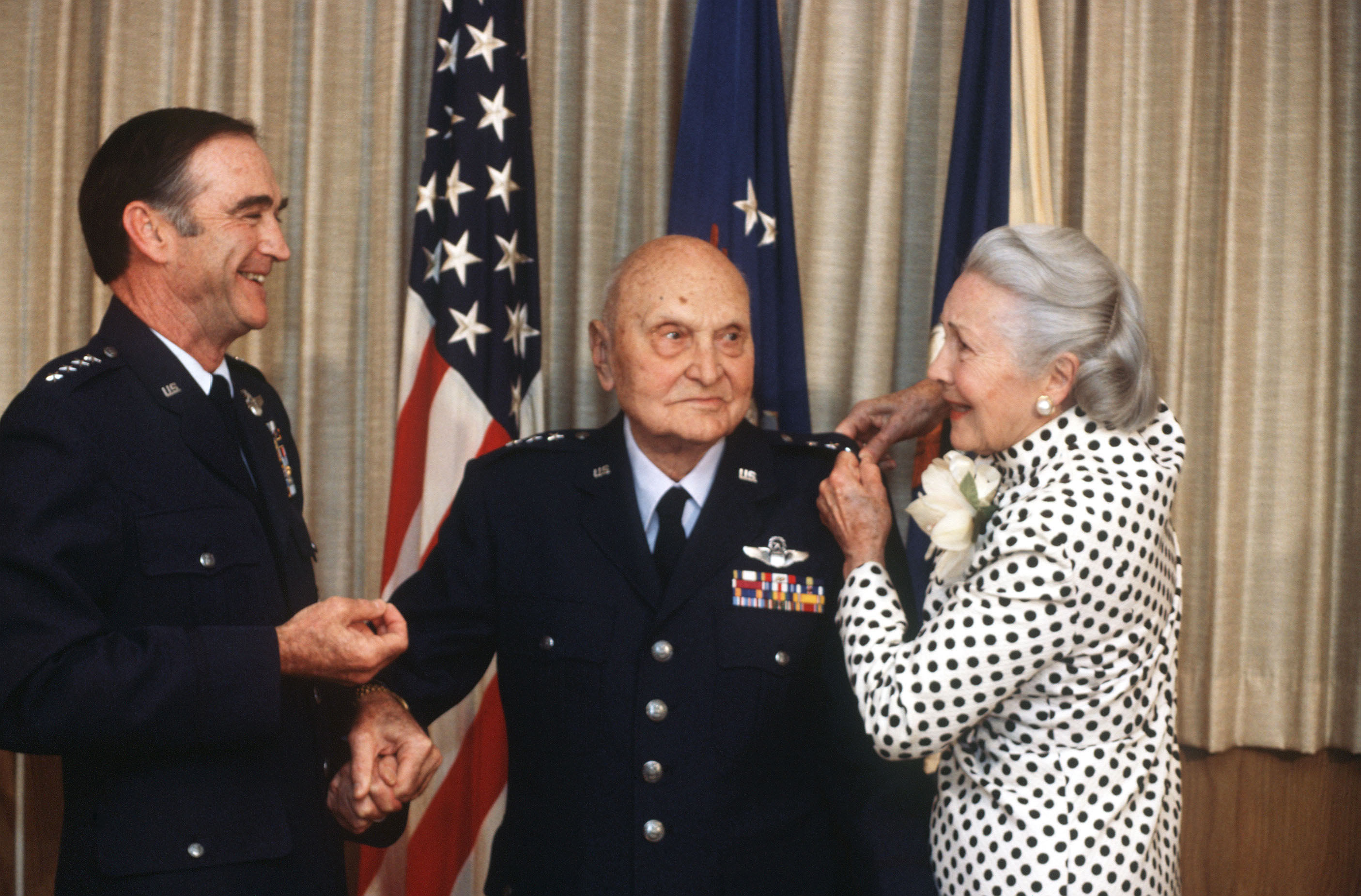
Eaker is pinned with his fourth star by General Charles A. Gabriel (left) and his wife Ruth (right) on April 1, 1985.

| Insignia | Rank | Component | Date |
|---|---|---|---|
| No pin insignia at the time | Second lieutenant | Infantry, Officers' Reserve Corps | 15 August 1917 |
| No pin insignia at the time | Second lieutenant | Regular Army, Infantry | 26 October (effective 15 November) 1917 |
| | First lieutenant | Regular Army, Infantry | 17 June 1918 (temporary); 6 September 1919 (permanent) |
| | Captain | Regular Army (United States Army Air Service) | 1 July 1920 |
| | Major | Regular Army, Air Corps | 20 April-26 July 1935 (temporary); 1 August 1935 (permanent) |
| | Lieutenant colonel | Regular Army, Air Corps | 1 December 1937 (temporary); 18 August 1940 (permanent) |
| | Temporary Colonel | Regular Army, Air Corps | 30 August 1940 (effective 1 February 1941) |
| | Colonel | Army of the United States | 24 December 1941 |
| | Brigadier general | Army of the United States | 17 January 1942 |
| | Major general | Army of the United States | 7 September 1942 |
| | Brigadier general | Regular Army (United States Army Air Forces) | 1 September 1943 |
| | Lieutenant general | Army of the United States | 13 September 1943 |
| | Major general | Regular Army (United States Army Air Forces) | 1 December 1944 |
| | Major general | Regular Army (United States Army Air Forces), Retired | 31 August 1947 |
| | Lieutenant general | United States Air Force, Retired | 29 June 1948 |
| | General (Honorary) | United States Air Force, Retired | 4 April 1985 |

== Awards and decorations ==
Command pilot

- Air Force Distinguished Service Medal
- Army Distinguished Service Medal with two oak leaf clusters
- Navy Distinguished Service Medal
- Silver Star
- Legion of Merit
- Distinguished Flying Cross with oak leaf cluster
- Air Medal
- World War I Victory Medal
- American Defense Service Medal
- American Campaign Medal
- European-African-Middle East Campaign Medal with bronze service stars
- World War II Victory Medal
- Knight Commander of the Order of the British Empire
- Knight Commander of the Bath
- Legion of Honor, Grand Officer (France)
- Croix de Guerre with Palm (France)
- Silver Cross of Merit with Swords (Srebrny Krzyż Zasługi z Mieczami) (Poland)
- Order of Kutuzov Second Class (Union of Soviet Socialist Republics)
- Grand Master of the Order of Saints Maurice and Lazarus (Italy)
- Order of the Liberator General San Martin, Commander (Spanish: Comendador) (Argentina)
- Order of the Southern Cross, Grand Officer (Brazil)
- Officer, Order of the Sun (Peru)
- Order of Aeronautical Merit (Brazil)
- Order of the Condor of the Andes (Bolivia)
- Order of Merit, Officer (Chile)
- Order of the Liberator, Officer (Venezuela)
- Order of the Partisan Star, First Class (Yugoslavia)
- Congressional Gold Medal

=== General Ira C. Eaker Award ===
Ira C. Eaker ribbon

The General Ira C. Eaker Award is given by the Civil Air Patrol in honor of the former Deputy Commander U.S. Army Air Forces and aviation pioneer. It is presented to cadets who have completed the requirements of the final phase of the cadet program. The award is accompanied by promotion to the grade of Cadet Lieutenant Colonel, the second highest grade in the program.

=== Halls of fame ===
In 1970, Eaker was inducted into the National Aviation Hall of Fame in Dayton, Ohio.

In 1993, he was inducted into the Airlift/Tanker Association Hall of Fame.

In 1981, Eaker was inducted into the International Air & Space Hall of Fame at the San Diego Air & Space Museum.

== Influence on literature ==
Kurt Vonnegut quotes his foreword to David Irving's The Destruction of Dresden in his novel Slaughterhouse-Five.
