= Spy Rock (Mason County, Texas) =

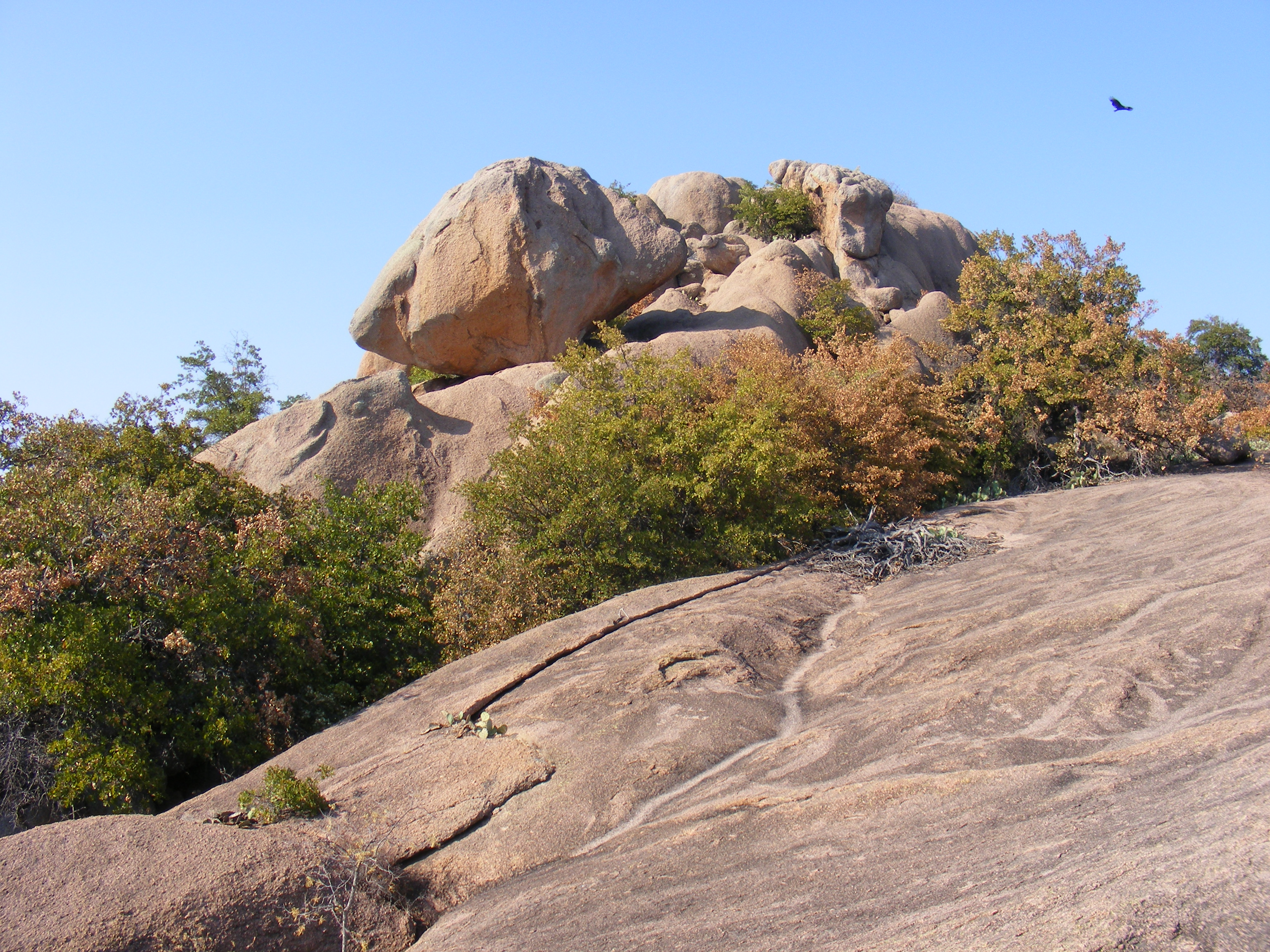
- Spy Rock

Highest point
- Elevation: 1,749 ft (533 m)
- Coordinates: 30°53′49″N 99°09′00″W

Geography
- Location within Texas
- Location: Mason County, Texas, United States

Geology
- Mountain type: Pink granite

Spy Rock is a pink granite dome located in the Llano Uplift in Mason County, Texas, rising 1,749 feet (533 m) feet above sea level. The peak is located south of Fredonia.

As with Enchanted Rock, Spy Rock is formed of middle Precambrian (1,082 ± 6 million years ago) material. The base of the peak can be reached by the public, but the dome itself is on private property and accessible only with property owner's permission. Federal and state statutes, regulations and rules governing trespassing, archeological sites and historic sites apply. The state Game Warden as a commissioned peace officer is authorized to inspect natural resources and take necessary action for the preservation of the resources.

== Gallery ==
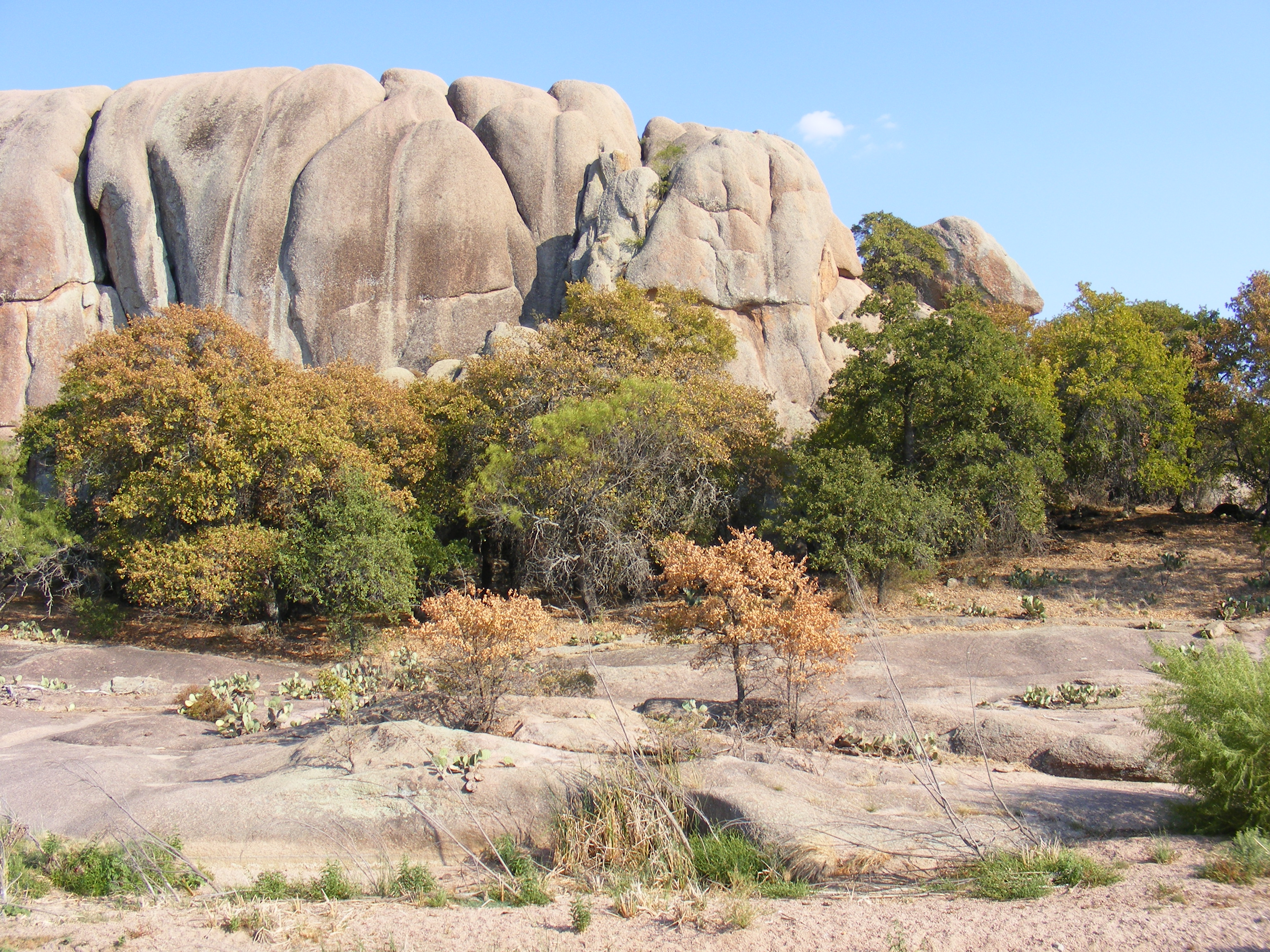
Spy Rock Texas backside

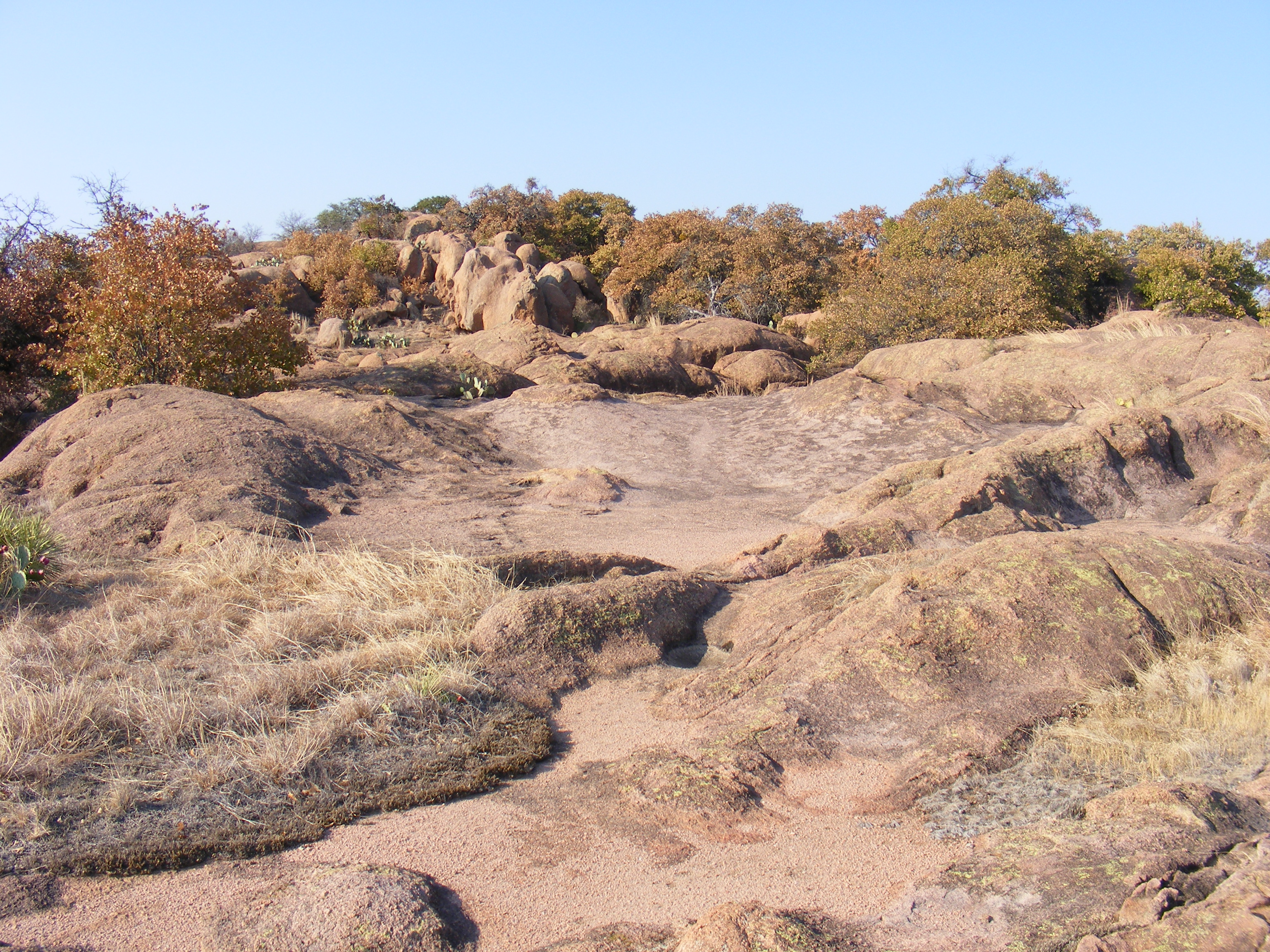
Spy Rock outcroppings

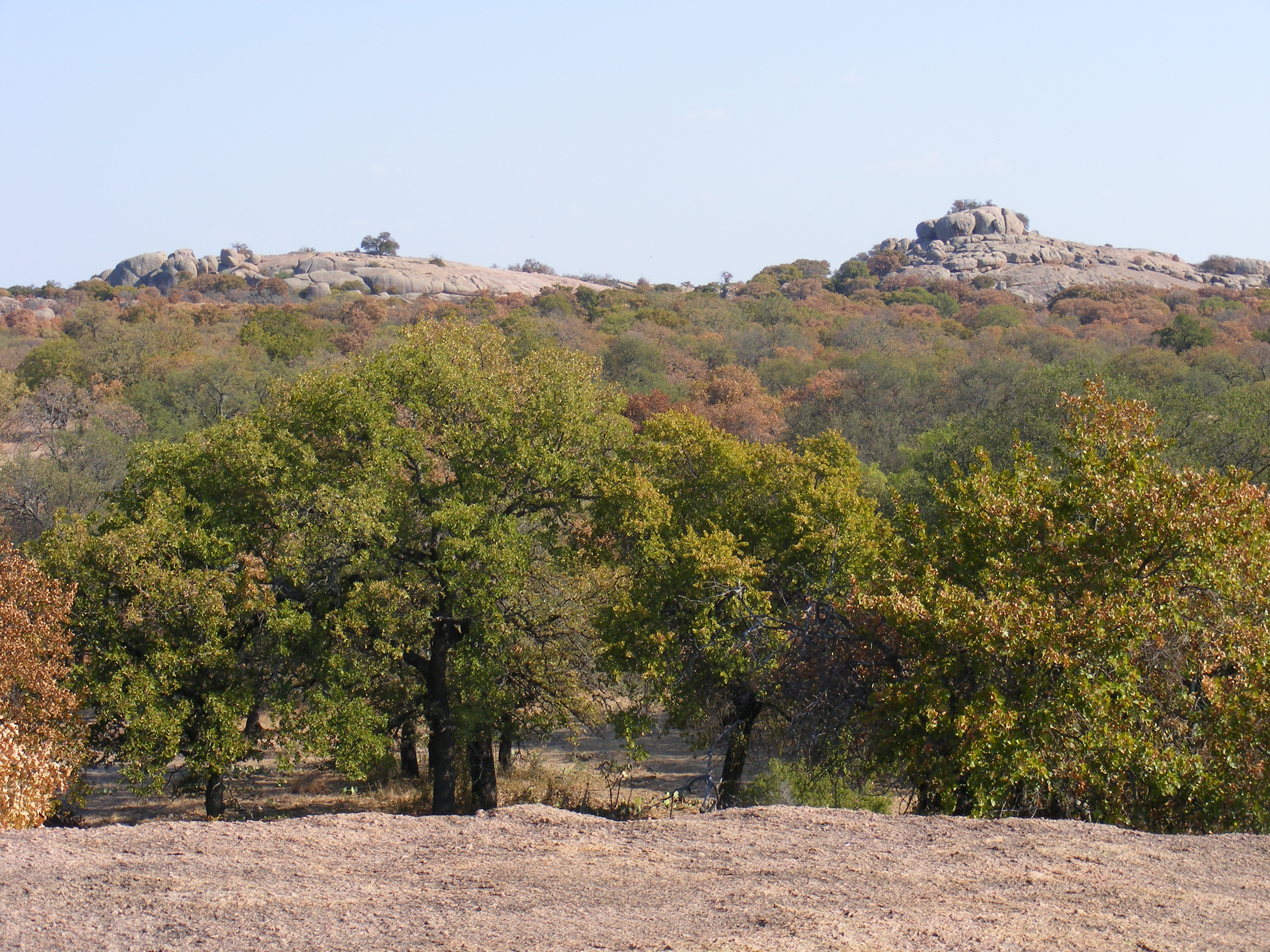
Spy rock distant outcroppings
