= Fredonia, Mason County, Texas =

Fredonia, Texas
- Unincorporated community
- Location within the state of Texas Fredonia, Texas (the United States)
- Coordinates: 30°55′56″N 99°06′48″W
- Country: United States
- State: Texas
- County: Mason
- Elevation: 1,657 ft (505 m)

Population (2000)
  - Total: 50
- Time zone: UTC-6 (Central (CST))
  - Summer (DST): UTC-5 (CDT)
- ZIP code: 76842
- Area code: 325
- FIPS code: 48-27372
- GNIS feature ID: 1357701

Fredonia is an unincorporated community in Mason County, Texas, United States. The community is located near the county line of Mason and San Saba counties, where State Highway 71 intersects with Ranch to Market Road 386. Fredonia has a post office, with the ZIP code 76842.

== Beginnings ==
Jack and Caroline Lathum and Chaney and Isabella Couch are the earliest known settlers to arrive near Deer Creek in San Saba County in the 1850s. The original school was named Hayes and Lathum School, but the residents petitioned the county to rename it Deer Creek school. This caused the community to be reorganized as Deer Creek, in order for the school to be renamed in 1878.

== Post office ==
A conflict arose over the naming of the post office as Deerton. A different community named Deerton had been granted a post office on March 17, 1879, and Samuel Hayes was appointed as postmaster. In 1880, the settlers of Deer Creek moved two miles inside the Mason County line, and renamed their settlement Fredonia. William Kniveton was the first postmaster when Fredonia was granted a post office on March 20, 1880.

== As Fredonia ==
Fredonia had a grist mill, a stage stop, and a coop store run by The National Grange of the Order of Patrons of Husbandry. A blacksmith shop, churches, and a community newspaper were established. The newspaper Kicker was bought out by the Mason County News in 1910. Fredonia received its first telephone line in 1914, and a gasoline filling station coinciding with the increasing usage of the automobile. The population has gradually declined as the small land holders sold out to larger ones. The population was 50, as of the year 2000.

== See also ==
- Spy Rock
