= Fire-cracked rock =

Archaeological term for altered rock

In archaeology, fire-cracked rock (FCR) or fire-affected rock (FAR), is rock of any type that has been altered and split as the result of deliberate heating. It is a feature of many archaeological sites. In many cases, fire-cracked rock results when stones were used to line hearths and earth ovens or were heated to provide a longer-lasting heat-source (similar to a modern hot water bottle).

In other cases, fire-cracked rock results from stone being used to heat or boil water. The stones were heated and dropped directly into water held in containers made of skin or baskets and pottery. This use has led fire-cracked rocks to be called "pot-boilers" in Britain.

Central Texas in the United States in particular is well-known archaeologically for its burned rock middens, which are piles of fire-cracked rock—often exceeding several tons of material. These represent the remains of earth ovens used in cooking sotol bulbs and other plants during prehistoric times. In Britain, these features are referred to as "burnt mounds".

A fire-cracked rock bibliography has been compiled by William Doleman and published on the Tennessee Archaeology Net bibliography page
