= Art, Texas =

- Unincorporated community
- Location within the state of Texas Art, Texas (the United States)
- Coordinates: 30°44′19″N 99°06′41″W
- Country: United States
- State: Texas
- County: Mason
- Elevation: 1,365 ft (416 m)

Population
  - Total: 18
- Time zone: UTC-6 (Central (CST))
  - Summer (DST): UTC-5 (CDT)
- Area code: 325
- FIPS code: 48-04180
- GNIS feature ID: 1351289

Art is an unincorporated community in Mason County, Texas, United States. According to the Handbook of Texas, the highly-dispersed community had an estimated population of 18 in 2016.

== Geography ==
Art is situated along State Highway 29, approximately nine miles east of Mason, 27 miles west of Llano and 90 miles west of Austin.

== History ==
As one of the first settlements in Mason County, the community was initially settled around 1856, when five German families set up homesteads along Upper Willow Creek. They were followed by German settlers from nearby Fredericksburg, who established themselves along Willow Creek for about ten miles in both directions. Originally called Willow Creek (or Upper Willow Creek), the community suffered numerous Indian raids, although nearby Fort Mason offered some protection. A log Methodist church building that doubled as a schoolhouse was built in 1858. That building was replaced by a stone structure in 1875. In 1883, J.A. Hoerster opened one of the first general stores in the community. In 1886, Otto Plehwe purchased the store from Hoerster. Plehwe established a post office in the store soon after and served as its first postmaster. At that time, Plehwe renamed the community Plehweville, but the post office department requested a name change as its difficult spelling caused mail to be lost. On December 23, 1920, Eli Dechart had taken over as store owner and postmaster and decided to rename the town Art after the last three letters of his name.

Throughout its history, Art has remained a small, primarily ranching community. From 1925 to the mid-1960s, the population remained steady at around 25 before experiencing a brief increase to 46 in the late 1960s. The population continued to decline during the latter half of the twentieth century.

Today, Art exists as a widely dispersed community. Despite its size, Art continues to have a functioning post office (zip code: 76820).

== Education ==
Public Education in the community of Art is provided by the Mason Independent School District.
