= Mason County, Texas =

County in Texas, United States

- County
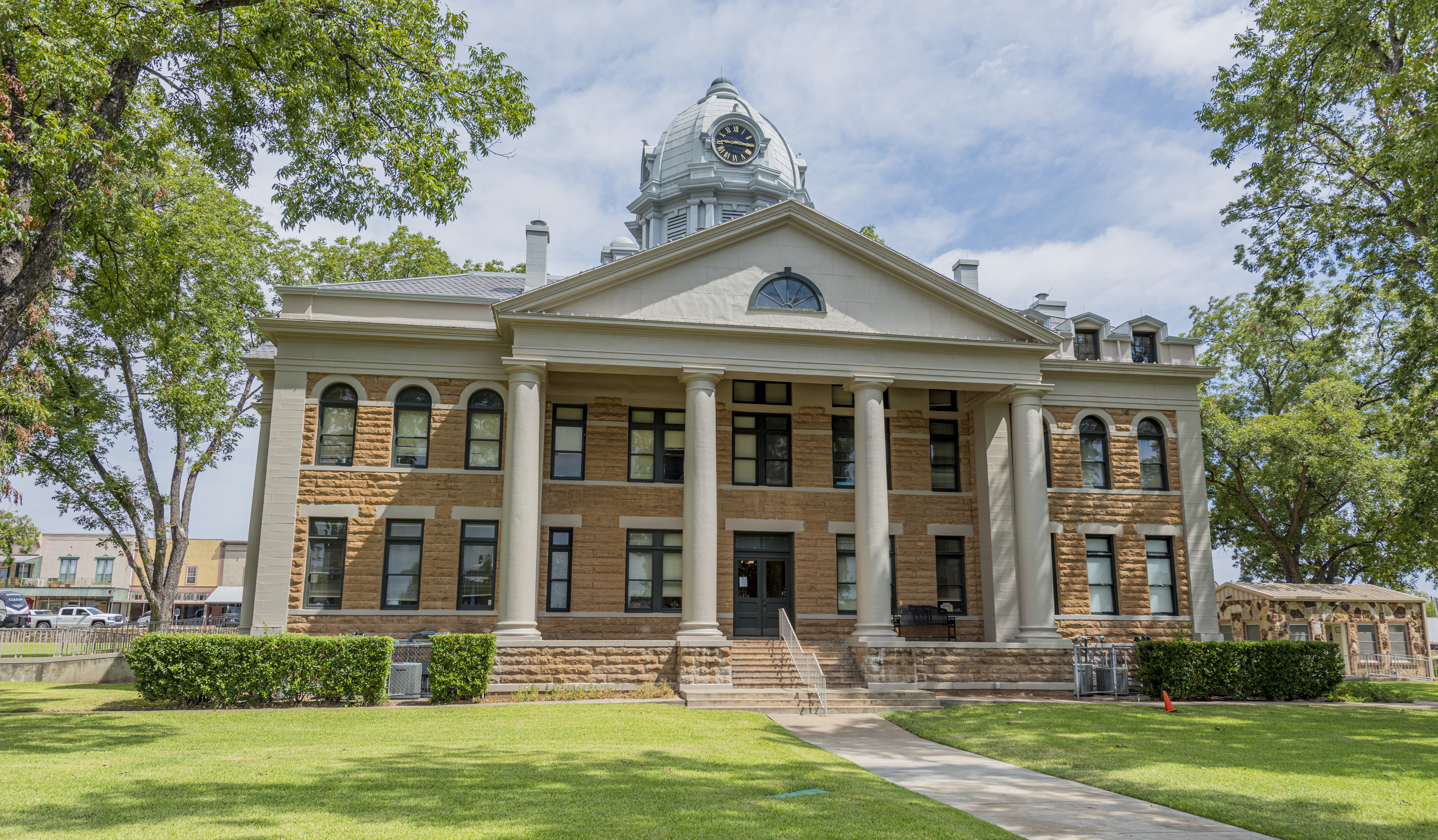
- The Mason County Courthouse in Mason

- Location within the U.S. state of Texas
- Coordinates: 30°43′N 99°13′W
- Country: United States
- State: Texas
- Founded: 1858
- Named for: Fort Mason
- Seat: Mason
- Largest city: Mason

Area
  - Total: 932 sq mi (2,410 km^{2})
  - Land: 929 sq mi (2,410 km^{2})
  - Water: 3.4 sq mi (8.8 km^{2}) 0.4%

Population (2020)
  - Total: 3,953
  - Estimate (2025): 3,990 ▲
  - Density: 4.26/sq mi (1.64/km^{2})
- Time zone: UTC−6 (Central)
  - Summer (DST): UTC−5 (CDT)
- Congressional district: 11th
- Website: www.co.mason.tx.us

Mason County is a rural county located on the Edwards Plateau in the U.S. state of Texas. At the 2020 census, its population was 3,953. Its county seat is Mason. The county is named for Fort Mason, which was located in the county.

== History ==
The original inhabitants were Lipan Apache and Comanches. The Meusebach–Comanche Treaty was signed in 1847.

- 1851, July 6 – Fort Mason is established.
- 1858, January 22 – Mason County, named for Fort Mason, is established by an act of Texas state legislature. First post offices are established.
- 1860 Population of 630 includes 18 slaves.
- 1861,

February – County, spurred in part by anti-slavery sentiments of German residents, overwhelmingly votes against secession from the Union.
March – Fort Mason surrendered to the Confederacy, who leave it mostly vacant and thereby cause an uptick in Indian attacks on the area.
May 20 – Voters select town of Mason as County Seat.

- 1866–1868 Federal troops occupy Fort Mason, only to eventually abandon it.
- 1869 Courthouse and jail are erected.
- 1870 May 16 – Herman Lehmann and brother Willie are captured by Apaches, but Willie escapes within days.
- 1870–1898 The county had four women homesteaders: Louisa J. Hendryx, Mahala Hunnicutt, Sarah E. Morris and Priscilla Sparks
- 1872 The last Indian raid in the county happens.
- 1875–1877

County’s first newspaper begins publication.
Hoo Doo War over cattle rustling.
Most famous participant in the war is Johnny Ringo, who on September 25, 1875, kills James Cheyney.
Courthouse fire destroys all records.

- 1878, May 12 – Herman Lehmann, escorted by soldiers, finally returns to his family.
- 1880s Manganese is discovered. Wakefield Company opens Spiller mines. Iron ore is discovered. Prospecting begins for gold, silver and coal.
- 1882–83 Hereford cattle are introduced into the county. Provisions made for county wide road work.
- 1887 The county petitions for state aid for needy residents.
- 1890s County places a bounty on wolves, wildcats and mountain lions.
- 1902 Mason installs its first telephone in the county judge's office.
- 1918 October 3 – Eighteen months after United States Congress declares war on Germany, the Mason County Council of Defense draws up resolution to abandon the use of the German language in the county. The majority of County residents are of German heritage.
- 1919 First oil and gas lease in the county. Construction begins on the Mason County section of the Puget Sound-to-the-Gulf Highway.
- 1920s Radios come to Mason County.
- 1938 Pedernales Electric Cooperative is formed to provide rural electrification. Mason County joins in June.
- 1946 Local soil-conservation board organized. County schools consolidated.
- 2021 Mason County Courthouse (Texas), constructed in 1909, burns down as a result of arson.

== Geography ==
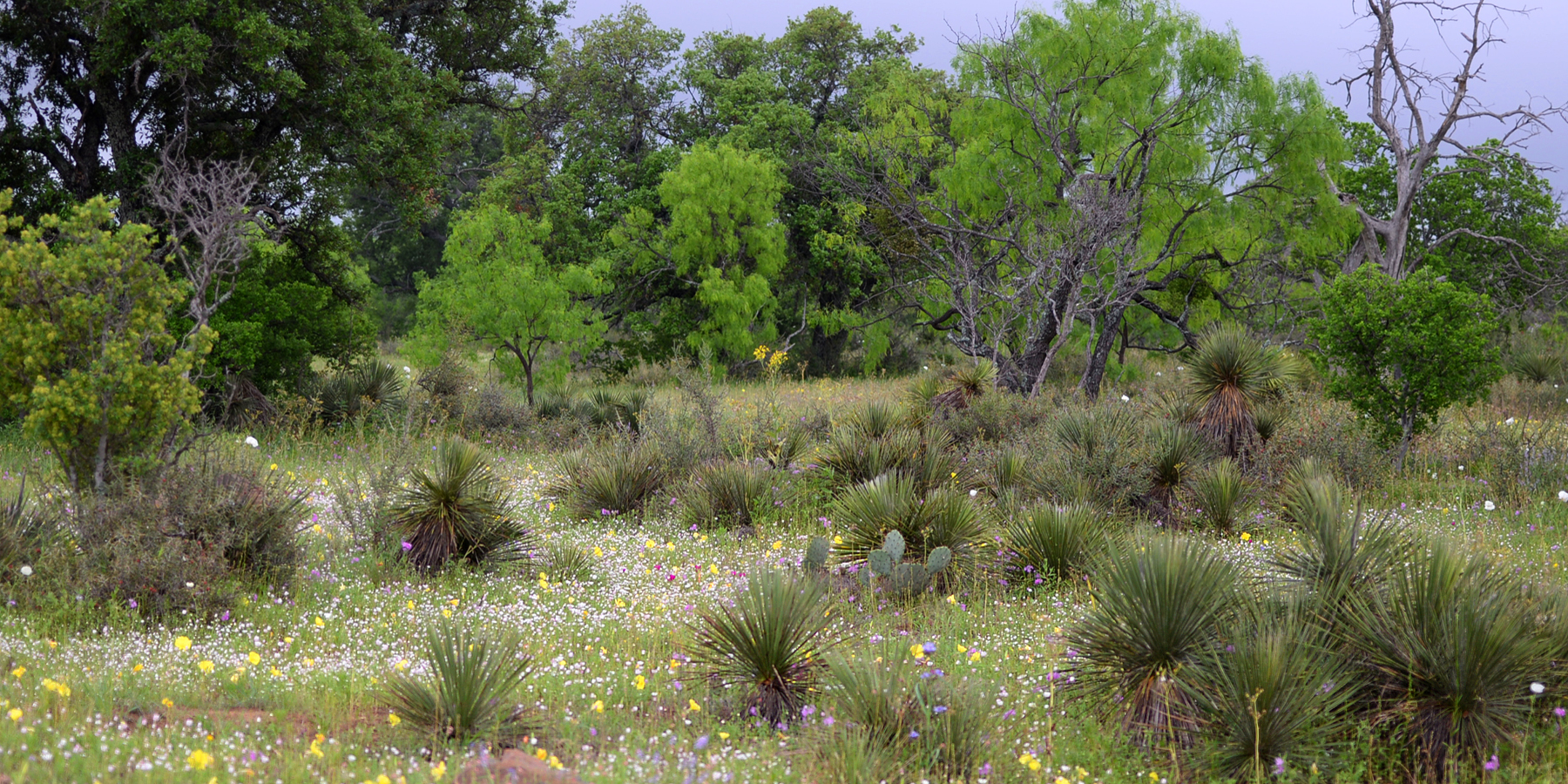
Ranchland in the Edwards Plateau, Mason County, Texas, USA (April 17, 2015).

According to the U.S. Census Bureau, the county has a total area of 932 square miles (2,410 km^{2}), of which 3.4 square miles (8.8 km^{2}) (0.4%) are covered by water.

=== Major highways ===
- U.S. Highway 87
- U.S. Highway 377
- State Highway 29
- State Highway 71

=== Adjacent counties ===
- McCulloch County (north)
- San Saba County (northeast)
- Llano County (east)
- Gillespie County (south)
- Kimble County (southwest)
- Menard County (west)

== Demographics ==
Historical population
Census	Pop.	Note	%±
1860	630		—
1870	678		7.6%
1880	2,655		291.6%
1890	5,180		95.1%
1900	5,573		7.6%
1910	5,683		2.0%
1920	4,824		−15.1%
1930	5,511		14.2%
1940	5,378		−2.4%
1950	4,945		−8.1%
1960	3,780		−23.6%
1970	3,356		−11.2%
1980	3,683		9.7%
1990	3,423		−7.1%
2000	3,738		9.2%
2010	4,012		7.3%
2020	3,953		−1.5%
2025 (est.)	3,990	▲	0.9%
U.S. Decennial Census; 1850–2010 2010 2020

=== Racial and ethnic composition ===
Mason County, Texas – Racial and ethnic composition Note: the US Census treats Hispanic/Latino as an ethnic category. This table excludes Latinos from the racial categories and assigns them to a separate category. Hispanics/Latinos may be of any race.
Race / Ethnicity (NH = Non-Hispanic)	Pop 1980	Pop 1990	Pop 2000	Pop 2010	Pop 2020	% 1980	% 1990	% 2000	% 2010	% 2020
White alone (NH)	3,069	2,734	2,912	3,092	2,948	83.33%	79.87%	77.90%	77.07%	74.58%
Black or African American alone (NH)	11	6	5	14	4	0.30%	0.18%	0.13%	0.35%	0.10%
Native American or Alaska Native alone (NH)	2	9	16	11	0	0.05%	0.26%	0.43%	0.27%	0.00%
Asian alone (NH)	3	3	2	7	2	0.08%	0.09%	0.05%	0.17%	0.05%
Native Hawaiian or Pacific Islander alone (NH)	x	x	0	0	0	x	x	0.00%	0.00%	0.00%
Other race alone (NH)	0	0	5	4	16	0.00%	0.00%	0.13%	0.10%	0.40%
Mixed race or Multiracial (NH)	x	x	15	20	100	x	x	0.40%	0.50%	2.53%
Hispanic or Latino (any race)	598	671	783	864	883	16.24%	19.60%	20.95%	21.54%	22.34%
Total	3,683	3,423	3,738	4,012	3,953	100.00%	100.00%	100.00%	100.00%	100.00%

=== 2020 census ===
As of the 2020 census, the county had a population of 3,953. The median age was 52.7 years. 19.0% of residents were under the age of 18 and 32.2% of residents were 65 years of age or older. For every 100 females there were 100.3 males, and for every 100 females age 18 and over there were 95.7 males age 18 and over.

The racial makeup of the county was 80.6% White, 0.2% Black or African American, 0.4% American Indian and Alaska Native, 0.1% Asian, <0.1% Native Hawaiian and Pacific Islander, 7.3% from some other race, and 11.4% from two or more races. Hispanic or Latino residents of any race comprised 22.3% of the population.

<0.1% of residents lived in urban areas, while 100.0% lived in rural areas.

There were 1,777 households in the county, of which 24.0% had children under the age of 18 living in them. Of all households, 51.5% were married-couple households, 19.5% were households with a male householder and no spouse or partner present, and 26.0% were households with a female householder and no spouse or partner present. About 32.0% of all households were made up of individuals and 19.6% had someone living alone who was 65 years of age or older.

There were 2,467 housing units, of which 28.0% were vacant. Among occupied housing units, 77.0% were owner-occupied and 23.0% were renter-occupied. The homeowner vacancy rate was 0.5% and the rental vacancy rate was 9.7%.

=== 2000 census ===
At the 2000 census, 3,738 people, 1,607 households and 1,110 families were residing in the county. The population density was 4 people per square mile (1.5 people/km^{2}). The 2,372 housing units had an average density of 2 units per square mile (0.77/km^{2}). The racial makeup of the county was 91.60% White, 0.13% Black or African American, 0.62% Native American, 0.05% Asian, 0.03% Pacific Islander, 5.75% from other races, and 1.82% from two or more races. About 20.95% of the population were Hispanics or Latinos of any race.

Of the 1,607 households, 25.9% had children under 18 living with them, 59.1% were married couples living together, 7.7% had a female householder with no husband present, and 30.9% were not families. About 29.2% of all households were made up of individuals, and 17.9% had someone living alone who was 65 or older. The average household size was 2.31 and the average family size was 2.83.

The county's age distribution was 22.4% under of 18, 4.7% from 18 to 24, 20.7% from 25 to 44, 28.8% from 45 to 64, and 23.5% who were 65 older. The median age was 47 years. For every 100 females, there were 92.40 males. For every 100 females 18 and over, there were 87.6 males.

The median household income was $30,921 and the median family income was $39,360. Males had a median income of $28,125 compared with $20,000 for females. The per capita income was $20,931. About 10.10% of families and 13.2% of the population were below the poverty line, including 20.50% of those under 18 and 13.3% of those 65 or over.

== Communities ==
=== City ===
- Mason (county seat)

=== Unincorporated communities ===
- Art
- Fredonia
- Grit
- Hedwigs Hill
- Hilda
- Katemcy
- Loyal Valley
- Pontotoc

== Notable people ==
- Anna Mebus Martin (1820–1864): Chartered the Commercial Bank of Mason, wealthy businesswoman and rancher
- Louis (Ludwig) Martin (1820–1864): Co-founder of Hedwigs Hill, Mason County justice of the peace
- Governor Coke Stevenson (1888–1975): Born in Mason County
- Leonie von Meusebach–Zesch (1882–1944): Born in Mason County, pioneer dentist
- Gene Zesch (1932–): Sculptor
- Fred Gipson (February 7, 1908 – August 14, 1973): Author of Old Yeller

== Politics ==
United States presidential election results for Mason County, Texas
Year	Republican		Democratic		Third party(ies)	
Year	No.	%	No.	%	No.	%
1912	152	17.21%	472	53.45%	259	29.33%
1916	157	27.30%	386	67.13%	32	5.57%
1920	269	39.97%	304	45.17%	100	14.86%
1924	171	23.82%	384	53.48%	163	22.70%
1928	807	76.64%	244	23.17%	2	0.19%
1932	309	27.08%	828	72.57%	4	0.35%
1936	359	31.30%	787	68.61%	1	0.09%
1940	634	37.25%	1,065	62.57%	3	0.18%
1944	420	28.07%	822	54.95%	254	16.98%
1948	498	36.73%	836	61.65%	22	1.62%
1952	1,069	63.71%	606	36.11%	3	0.18%
1956	885	63.67%	504	36.26%	1	0.07%
1960	833	58.79%	575	40.58%	9	0.64%
1964	590	38.44%	941	61.30%	4	0.26%
1968	789	51.98%	560	36.89%	169	11.13%
1972	1,096	73.71%	369	24.82%	22	1.48%
1976	805	49.09%	814	49.63%	21	1.28%
1980	966	59.59%	630	38.86%	25	1.54%
1984	1,168	67.01%	570	32.70%	5	0.29%
1988	975	58.91%	671	40.54%	9	0.54%
1992	776	45.06%	570	33.10%	376	21.84%
1996	949	54.70%	618	35.62%	168	9.68%
2000	1,352	75.07%	417	23.15%	32	1.78%
2004	1,600	77.03%	459	22.10%	18	0.87%
2008	1,544	72.80%	546	25.74%	31	1.46%
2012	1,565	79.52%	380	19.31%	23	1.17%
2016	1,656	80.51%	354	17.21%	47	2.28%
2020	1,991	80.48%	457	18.47%	26	1.05%
2024	2,076	82.15%	434	17.17%	17	0.67%

United States Senate election results for Mason County, Texas1
Year	Republican		Democratic		Third party(ies)	
Year	No.	%	No.	%	No.	%
2024	2,027	80.85%	441	17.59%	39	1.56%

United States Senate election results for Mason County, Texas2
Year	Republican		Democratic		Third party(ies)	
Year	No.	%	No.	%	No.	%
2020	1,980	80.65%	443	18.04%	32	1.30%

Texas Gubernatorial election results for Mason County
Year	Republican		Democratic		Third party(ies)	
Year	No.	%	No.	%	No.	%
2022	1,703	85.53%	268	13.46%	20	1.00%

== See also ==
- Adelsverein
- German Texan
- Honey Creek
- List of museums in Central Texas
- Meusebach Homesite
- National Register of Historic Places listings in Mason County, Texas
- Recorded Texas Historic Landmarks in Mason County
- Spy Rock
