= Fort Mason (Texas) =

Fort Mason, Texas
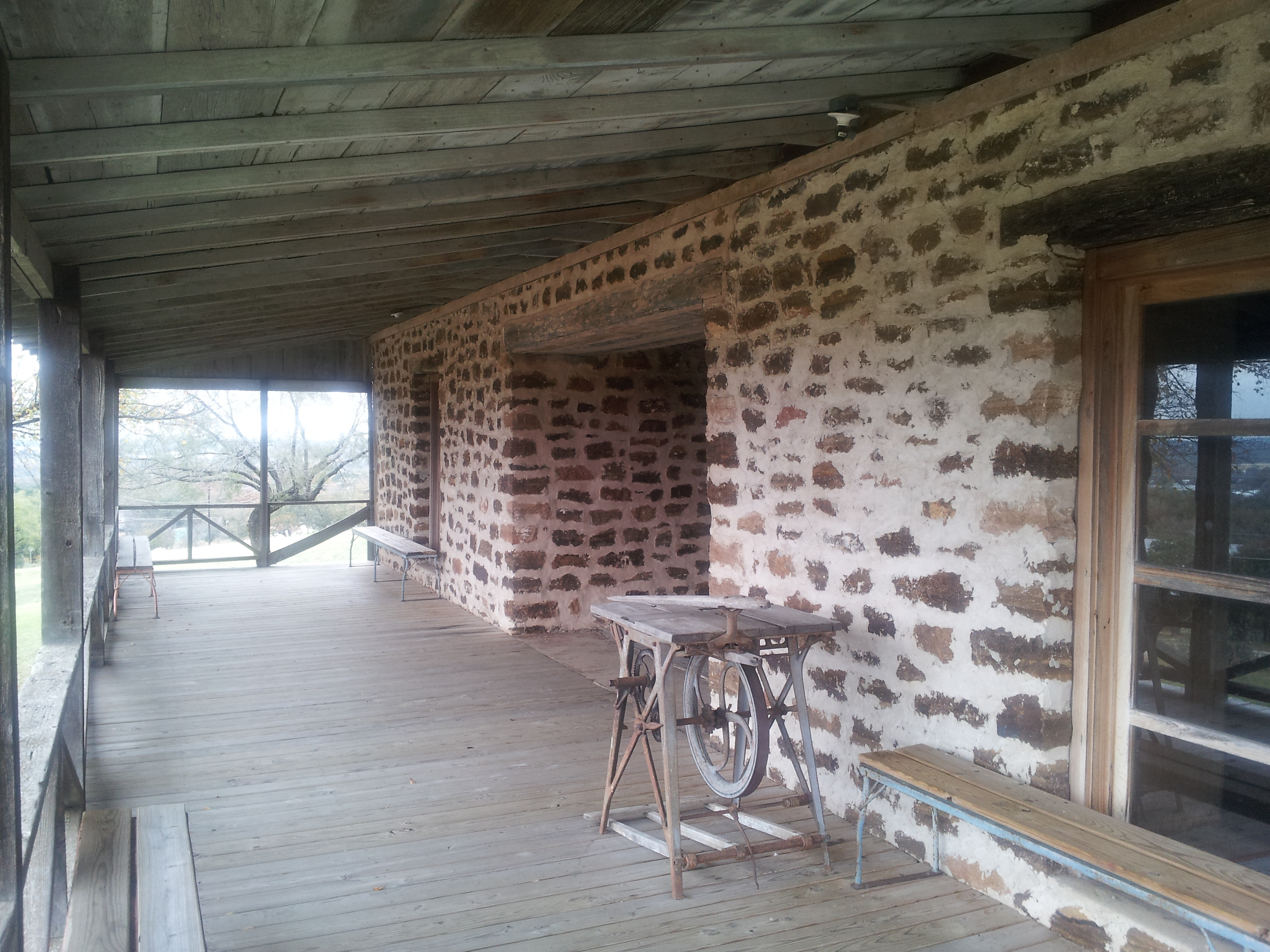
- Fort Mason Officer's Quarters

- Location within the state of Texas
- Coordinates: 30°44′24″N 99°14′00″W
- Country: United States
- State: Texas
- County: Mason
- Time zone: UTC-6 (Central (CST))
  - Summer (DST): UTC-5 (CDT)
- ZIP code: 76856
- Area code: 325
- FIPS code: 48-
- GNIS feature ID

Fort Mason was established on July 6, 1851, in present-day Mason County, Texas. It was named in honor of George Thomson Mason, a United States Army second lieutenant killed in the Thornton Affair during the Mexican–American War near Brownsville, April 25, 1846. At various times from 1856 to 1861, this was the home fort for Albert Sidney Johnston, George H. Thomas, Earl Van Dorn, and Robert E. Lee. The fort was abandoned by the military in the 1870s, and restored by a group of local citizens in 1975. Visitors can tour the reproduction officers' quarters at the Fort Mason Museum.

The fort is designated a Recorded Texas Historic Landmark in 1936, marker number 11275.

== History ==
Fort Mason, Texas, was established by the United States War Department as a front-line defense against Kiowa, Lipan Apache, and Comanche, on July 6, 1851. It was a large complex of twenty-five buildings constructed of natural stone. The site on Post Oak Hill near Comanche and Centennial Creeks was chosen by Lieutenant Colonel William J. Hardee and surveyor Richard Austin Howard. Brevet Major Hamilton W. Merrill, along with companies A and B of the Second Dragoons, established the fort itself. Originally part of Gillespie County, Mason County was named for the fort when it was established in 1858. Comanche chief Katemcy at one point turned over two white captives aged 11 and 12, and again bringing them back when the captives ran away from the fort to reunite with the Comanches.

The fort was closed in January 1854, after which horse theft by Native Americans was reported and pursued by the military. It was reoccupied in 1856 by Company A, First Dragoons, from March to May and was occupied by companies B, C, D, G, H, and I of the Second United States Cavalry from January 14, 1856, with Col. Albert Sidney Johnston in command. Among those in the Second Regiment of Cavalry before the Civil War, George H. Thomas, Innis N. Palmer, George Stoneman, R. W. Johnson, Kenner Garrard, and Philip St. George Cooke became generals for the Union Army, while those who became generals for the Confederate States Army included Earl Van Dorn, Nathan George Evans, Charles W. Field, William P. Chambliss, Charles W. Phifer, Fitzhugh Lee, E. Kirby Smith, Robert E. Lee, John Bell Hood, and William J. Hardee.

Fort Mason was Robert E. Lee's last command with the United States Army.

Fort Mason was evacuated by federal troops on March 29, 1861, and reoccupied after the Civil War until 1869.

== Confederacy ==
The Confederate States Army took control of Fort Mason on March 29, 1861. In 1862, the CSA held at the fort 215 men prisoner on suspicion of sympathy to the Union, who were transferred to Austin in 1862.

== United States Army reoccupation ==
The United States Army reoccupied the fort on December 24, 1866, under the command of General John Porter Hatch. During this period, the fort was renovated with both civilian and military labor. Indian depredations had increased during the Civil War and were worse when the army returned. The Reconstruction era of the United States left its imprint on the fort's personnel, often leading to abandonment of duty and the resulting military discipline. By January 13, 1869, 25 buildings, either unoccupied or in poor shape, remained, with less than 70 soldiers. The order to close the fort was carried out on March 23, 1869. During 1870, the state of Texas organized several companies of frontier forces. Fort Mason was reopened in September of that year as headquarters for Companies A and B, Frontier Forces, under Capt. James M. Hunter, later county judge of Mason County. The fort was closed for good in 1871.

== Restoration ==
Mason citizens recycled material from the fort when building their own homes. A restoration of the fort began in 1975. Today, the fort belongs to the Mason County Historical Society.

== Gallery ==
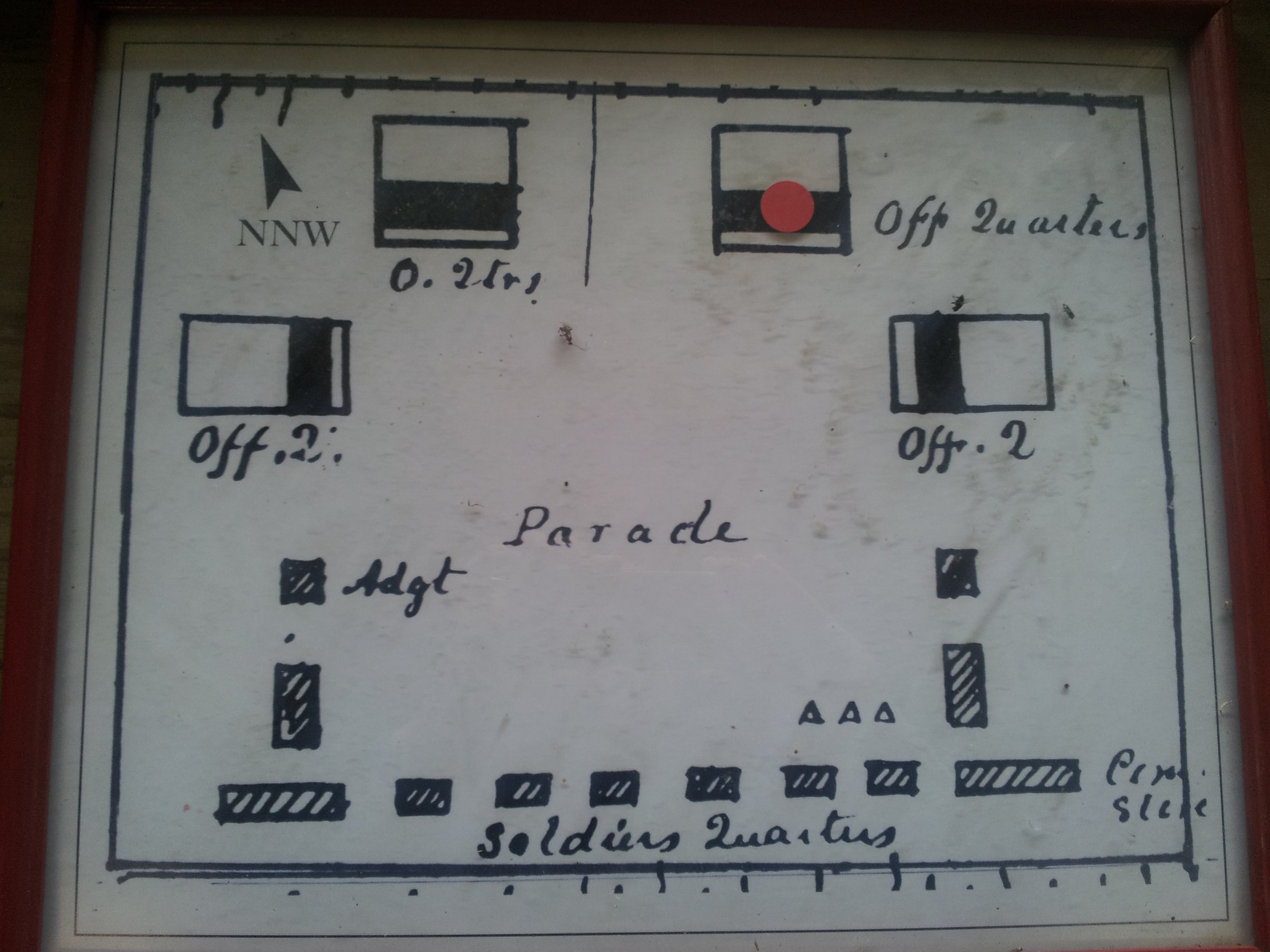
Fort Mason plan: The red dot indicates the location of the reconstructed officer's quarters.

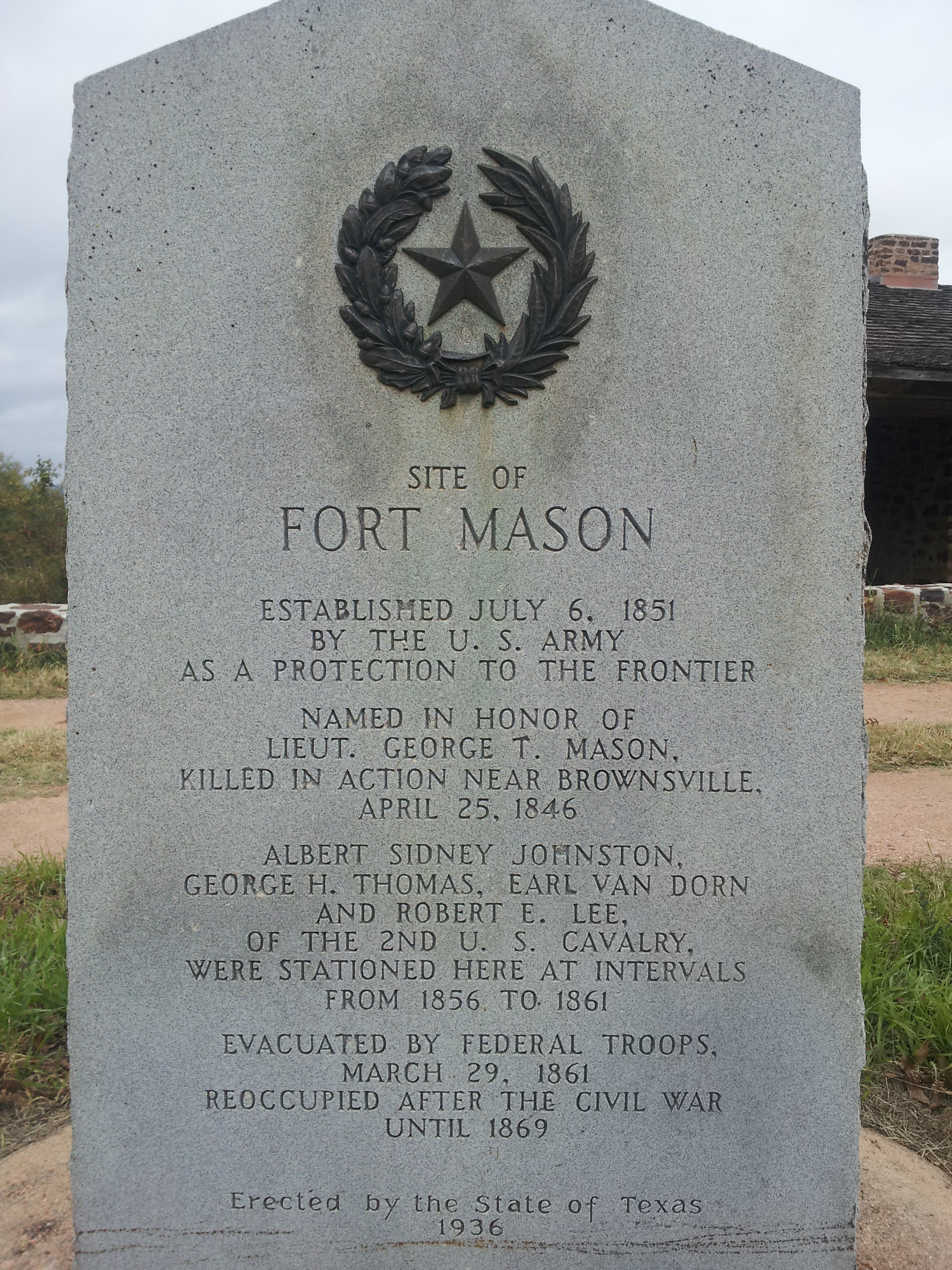
Historical marker

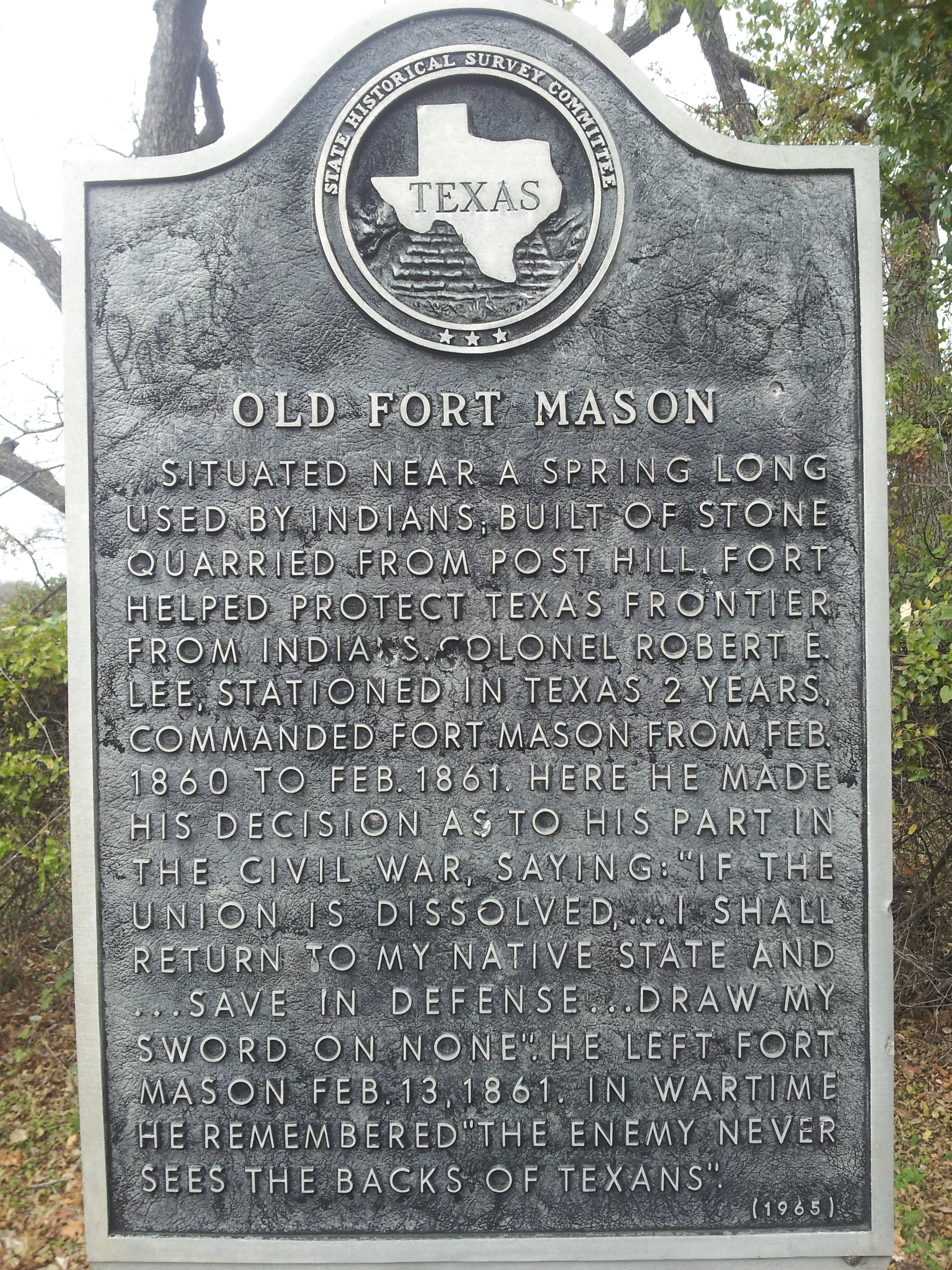
Historical marker

== See also ==
- Fort Mason (NRHP: San Francisco Port of Embarkation, US Army)
