= Noxville, Texas =

- Ghost town
- Location in Texas and the United States Noxville (the United States)
- Coordinates: 30°23′24″N 99°28′02″W
- Country: United States
- State: Texas
- County: Kimble
- Elevation: 2,077 ft (633 m)
- Time zone: UTC−6 (Central (CST))
  - Summer (DST): UTC−5 (CDT)
- Area code: 325
- FIPS code: 48-52704
- GNIS feature ID: 1380269

Noxville is a ghost town on the James River, 21 miles (34 km) east of Junction on Ranch to Market Road 479, in Kimble County, in the U.S. state of Texas.

== History ==
Noxville has actually had two locations in the area. Old Noxville was the site of the 1879 post office, begun by Noah Nox (also Knox), in his general store on the Little Devil's River. His wife Persis was the first postmaster. When James Milam became the postmaster in 1911, he moved the post office and town to the west side of the James River.

Among the first nonindigenous residents of the area, in addition to Nox, were farmers and ranchers Creed Taylor, Munroe McDonald, and James H. Parker. Parker was originally from Alabama and settled in the area at the end of the Civil War. He had been a second lieutenant in the 30th Texas Cavalry and eventually owned 12,000 acres in the area. He donated the land for the old school house. Taylor retired to Noxville after the death of his first wife, and after a career of military service to Texas. In Kimble County, he remarried and remained in Noxville the rest of his life.

Noxville had a native limestone school that remained in use until just prior to World War II. After the close of the school, students were then schooled at nearby Harper. The old Noxville school house remained as a voting precinct into the 21st century. The McDonald homestead and barn, the John New home and post office, and the James H. Parker home are still occupied by descendants of original settlers. The Noxville cemetery is still in use. Noxville and the Little Devils River crossing were on the Great Western Cattle Trail and were the first leg out of Kerrville for over 5 million Longhorns and a million horses from 1874 to 1885. A marker for the trail is in front of the old post office. As of the Census of 2000, Noxville had a population of three people.

== See also ==
- List of ghost towns in Texas
- Texas Hill Country
