= Roy McKay (American football) =

American football player (1920–1969)

- McKay in 1946

No. 3, 22
- Positions: Halfback, fullback, punter

Personal information
- Born: February 2, 1920; Mason County, Texas, U.S.
- Died: May 29, 1969 (aged 49); Sutton County, Texas, U.S.
- Listed height: 6 ft 0 in (1.83 m)
- Listed weight: 193 lb (88 kg)

Career information
- High school: Junction (Junction, Texas)
- College: Texas
- NFL draft: 1943: 5th round, 38th overall pick

Career history
- Green Bay Packers (1944–1947)

Awards and highlights
- NFL champion (1944); Second-team All-American (1942); First-team All-SWC (1942)

Career NFL statistics
- Games: 35
- Starts: 3
- Rushing yards: 288
- Touchdowns: 3
- Passing: 38-for-103
- Passing yards: 592
- TD–INT: 6–11
- Punting: 41.9 average
- Stats at Pro Football Reference

Roy Dale McKay (February 2, 1920 – May 29, 1969) was an American professional football player for the Green Bay Packers of the National Football League (NFL). He played college football for the Texas Longhorns. He was an All-American fullback in 1942 and was the most outstanding back in the 1943 Cotton Bowl.

In the NFL he was a member of the 1944 NFL Championship Green Bay Packers. He led the NFL in punting average in 1945 and 1946, and once passed to legendary Green Bay end Don Hutson for four touchdowns in a single quarter in a 1945 game against the Detroit Lions.

After a four-year stint with the Packers, McKay was traded to the Washington Redskins during the summer of 1948, but was ultimately released by the team without having played a regular season game.

== Biography ==
=== Early life ===
Roy McKay was born on February 2, 1920, in Mason County, Texas. He was a high school star at Junction. He grew up in the town of Junction and attended Junction High School, where he was a letterman playing football for the Junction Eagles.

=== Career ===
McKay played football for Texas for four years. In his senior year, he was the team captain and led the team to its 2nd 9-win season ever and its first-ever bowl game. In the Cotton Bowl, Texas won 14–7, with McKay connecting on a touchdown pass to Max Minor. In his final season he was named a second team All-American, All-Southwest Conference player, and Most Outstanding Back at the Cotton Bowl.

McKay was selected by the Green Bay Packers in the fifth round of the 1943 NFL draft. He later played four seasons with the team, followed by a brief stint with the Washington Redskins.

McKay won an NFL championship in 1944 as a member of Packers.

On October 7, 1945, McKay helped Hall of Fame Packer end Don Hutson enter the NFL record books in a game against the Detroit Lions at City Stadium in Green Bay. As part of a 41-point second quarter scoring explosion for the Bays, tailback McKay hit Hutson with touchdown passes of 59, 46, 17, and 6 yards. These four touchdowns, combined with five points after touchdown kicked by Hutson gave the superstar a total of 29 points for the period, an NFL record which still stands today.

An outstanding punter, McKay led the NFL in punting in 1945 and 1946, with season averages of 41.2 and 42.7 yards per punt, respectively.

During the July ahead the 1948 NFL season, Packer head coach Curly Lambeau traded McKay to the Washington Redskins for 6'4" tackle Don Deeks. He was released by the club in mid-September and never saw regular season action as a member of the Redskins.

=== Later life ===
After pro football, he served two years in the Air Force as a pilot, ran a business in Hamilton, and was an assistant football coach in Yoakum.

On May 29, 1969, McKay's body was found beside a small building about 100 feet from the main house at his father-in-law's ranch in Sutton County, Texas, a single gunshot wound to the forehead. A .22 caliber magnum rifle was discovered next to the body. The fatal shot was ruled to have been self-inflicted. He was 49 years old at the time of his death.

McKay was buried in Junction, Texas.
