= National Register of Historic Places listings in Kimble County, Texas =

Location of Kimble County in Texas

This is a list of the National Register of Historic Places listings in Kimble County, Texas.

This is intended to be a complete list of properties listed on the National Register of Historic Places in Kimble County, Texas. There are 4 properties listed on the National Register in the county. Two properties are also a Recorded Texas Historic Landmark.

This National Park Service list is complete through NPS recent listings posted March 21, 2025.

== Current listings ==
The locations of National Register properties may be seen in a mapping service provided.

	Name on the Register	Image	Date listed	Location	City or town	Description
1	Brambletye	Brambletye	July 15, 1982 (#82004511)	Off SR 2291; 30°33′51″N 99°51′21″W	Junction	Recorded Texas Historic Landmark
2	Kimble County Courthouse	Kimble County Courthouse	August 12, 2021 (#100006858)	501 Main St. 30°29′20″N 99°45′57″W	Junction	
3	State Highway 27 Bridge at Johnson Fork	State Highway 27 Bridge at Johnson Fork	October 10, 1996 (#96001113)	I-10, .6 mi. W of jct. with FM 2169; 30°25′34″N 99°40′47″W	Junction	
4	State Highway 27 Bridge at the South Llano River	State Highway 27 Bridge at the South Llano River	October 10, 1996 (#96001124)	Loop 481, .2 mi. E of 6th St. 30°29′16″N 99°45′45″W	Junction	

== See also ==
- National Register of Historic Places listings in Texas
- Recorded Texas Historic Landmarks in Kimble County
