= Telegraph, Texas =

Ghost town in Kimble County, Texas, United States

- Ghost town
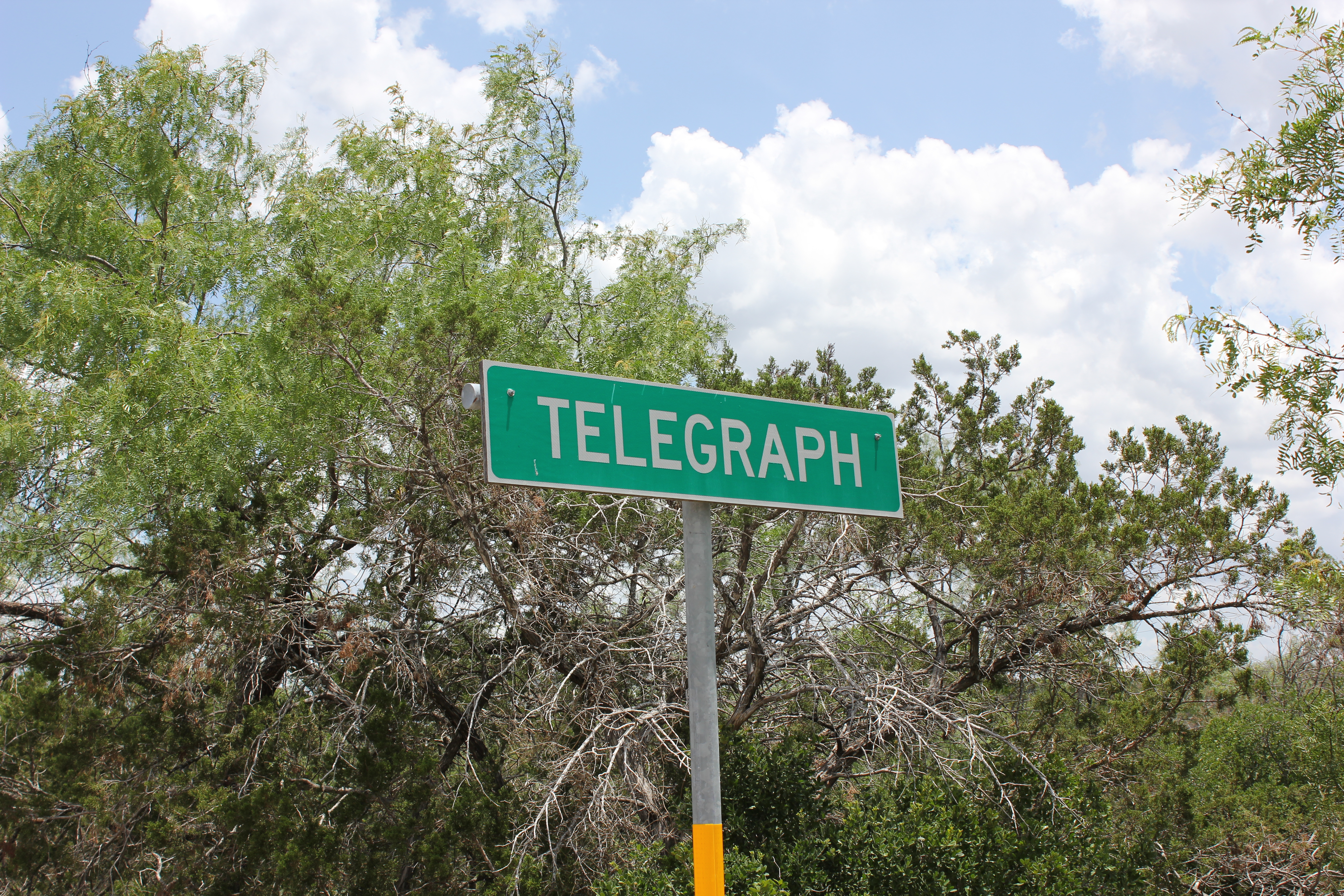

- Location in Texas and the United States Telegraph (the United States)
- Coordinates: 30°19′39″N 99°54′22″W
- Country: United States
- State: Texas
- County: Kimble
- Elevation: 1,854 ft (565 m)
- Time zone: UTC-6 (Central (CST))
  - Summer (DST): UTC-5 (CDT)
- Area code: 325
- FIPS code: 48-72092
- GNIS feature ID: 1379144

Telegraph is a ghost town in Kimble County, Texas, United States, that is located along on U.S. Route 377, 13 miles (21 km) southwest of Junction.

== History ==
Biographer Robert A. Caro notes, "the town had no telegraph; it had been given its name because telegraph poles had been cut from trees near there during the 1850s."

Ruth Holmes was appointed the first postmaster, when Telegraph was assigned a post office on February 17, 1900.

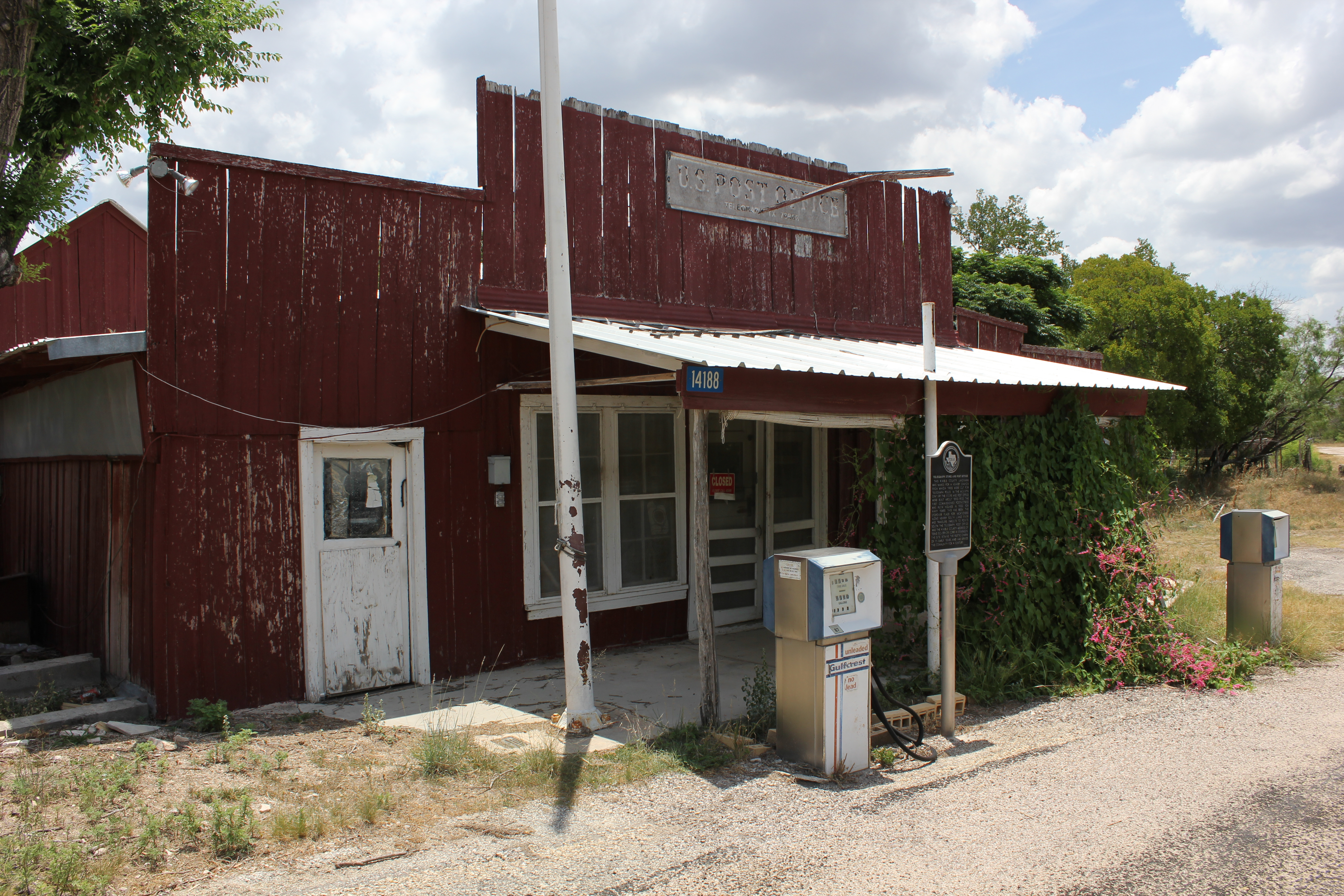
Telegraph store and former post office, July 2012

By the 1890, ranches were established in the surrounding area of the Texas Hill Country. During the 1920s, camping on the river near Telegraph was a popular vacation spot for campers, hunters, and fishermen, with the only building of the town serving as the residence/country store/post office (which closed in 2009). In 1925, Telegraph had rental cabins on the river, and a gas station-post office-general store (residence of the postmaster).

The general store and post office, built 1890–1900, was designated a Recorded Texas Historic Landmark in 1996, marker number 5219.

Telegraph was about a mile from the ranch built by Governor Coke Stevenson, known as "Mr. Texas".

At its peak in 1966, the town had a trade population of 56 people, made up of people living in the cedar breaks and on the ranches surrounding Telegraph, using its post office.

== Climate ==
The climate in this area is characterized by hot, humid summers and generally mild to cool winters. According to the Köppen climate classification system, Telegraph has a humid subtropical climate, Cfa on climate maps.

== Notable person ==
- Governor Coke Stevenson, long time Texas public servant, known also for his narrow loss to Lyndon B. Johnson in the 1948 U.S. Senate election

== See also ==
- List of ghost towns in Texas
