= Central Texas Electric Cooperative =

Central Texas Electric Cooperative, Inc. is a rural utility cooperative headquartered in Fredericksburg, Texas, with suboffices in Kingsland, Texas; Llano, Texas; and Mason, Texas.

The cooperative was formed in 1947 as a split-off from neighboring Pedernales Electric Cooperative.

Currently the cooperative has almost 7,000 miles of line, serving over 46,000 meters in the Texas Hill Country counties of Blanco, Gillespie, Kendall, Kerr, Kimble, Llano, Mason, McCulloch, Menard, Real, and San Saba.

== History ==
Central Texas Electric Cooperative was formed in 1947 as a split-off from neighboring Pedernales Electric Cooperative. Lyndon B. Johnson (TX-D), congressman and senator from the area, was instrumental in the creation of both cooperatives.

The Co-op lost an important lawsuit in 2013 against Lower Colorado River Authority.

In February 2021, thousands of Central Texas customers lost electricity, while Ted Cruz (TX-R) was in Cancún.

In October 2022, Central Texas CEO Robert A. "Bob" Loth retired after 38 years, to be replaced by Atanacio “Tachi” Hinojosa.

The Co-op's customers were spared the worst of the July 2025 Central Texas floods, but mourned with their neighbors.

== See also ==
- Energy law
- Lyndon B. Johnson
- Texas Railroad Commission
- United States energy law
