= Roosevelt, Kimble County, Texas =

- Ghost town
- Location in Texas and the United States Roosevelt (the United States)
- Coordinates: 30°29′28″N 100°03′18″W
- Country: United States
- State: Texas
- County: Kimble
- Elevation: 1,909 ft (582 m)
- Time zone: UTC-6 (Central (CST))
  - Summer (DST): UTC-5 (CDT)
- Area code: 325
- FIPS code: 48-63092
- GNIS feature ID: 1366846

Roosevelt is a historical community located 16 miles west of Junction on Texas Loop 291 in Kimble County, Texas, United States. Roosevelt has a small population of nine people, with several other ranching families outside the community limits. In 1997, Recorded Texas Historic Landmark number 4343 was designated to acknowledge the community of Roosevelt, Texas. Roosevelt is home to the Simon Brothers Cafe, Lyssy & Eckel Feeds and Allison Well Drilling.

Roosevelt is located along Interstate 10 at its midpoint in Texas, approximately 438 miles from both the New Mexico and Louisiana border.

== History ==
The establishment of Roosevelt happened when Alice C.E. Wagoner was appointed postmistress and a post office was established on August 22, 1898. Wagoner applied for the community as a different name, but the United States Postal Service named the town Roosevelt. It is presumed that the postal service chose the name for Theodore Roosevelt, who had made headlines the month before on July 1, 1898, with his charge up San Juan Hill with the Rough Riders. Roosevelt's 1st United States Volunteer Cavalry, known as the Rough Riders, was organized and trained at San Antonio on May 9–19, 1898.

Roosevelt was a shipping point for feed and grain for local sheep and goat farmers. Horses were bred in Roosevelt for the United States Cavalry, and also for the national polo market. In the early part of the 20th century, Roosevelt hosted polo matches.
