= Junction High School =

Location
- 1700 College Streete; Junction, Texas 76849-4599; United States; 30.488094°N 99.778053°W

Information
- School type: Public High School
- School district: Junction Independent School District
- Principal: Dana Davis
- Staff: 17.71 (FTE)
- Grades: 9-12
- Enrollment: 174 (2023-2024)
- Student to teacher ratio: 9.82
- Colors: Black & Gold
- Athletics conference: UIL Class AA
- Mascot: Eagles
- Website: Junction High School

Junction High School is a 2A public high school located in Junction, Texas (USA). It is part of the Junction Independent School District located in central Kimble County. In 2011, the school was rated "Academically Acceptable" by the Texas Education Agency.

== Athletics ==
The Junction Eagles compete in the following sports:

- American football
- Baseball
- Basketball
- Cheerleading
- Cross Country
- Football
- Golf
- Softball
- Tennis
- Track and Field
- Volleyball

=== State Titles ===
- Boys Track -
  - 1948(B), 2002(2A)
- Spirit and Cheer Team
  - 2016 (2A), 2017 (2A), 2018 (2A)

== Notable alumni ==
- Andrew Murr (Class of 1995), former county judge of Kimble County; incoming Republican member of the Texas House of Representatives from District 53
