= James River (Texas) =

Coordinates: 30.5001878°N 99.3961664°W

Location
- Country: United States

Physical characteristics
- Source
  - location: Mason County Texas
- Mouth
  - location: Llano River

The James River is located in Kimble and Mason Counties, in the U.S. state of Texas. The Llano River in Mason County is the location of the mouth of the James River, and it flows southeast for 36.5 miles (58.7 km) past the Kimble County ghost town of Noxville. The river intersects with the James River Spring and with the Little Devils River in southeastern Kimble County. The valleys along the James River became sites for 19th-century European settlements. The river is a destination for outdoor enthusiasts of whitewater kayaking and rafting.

In October 2023 KXAN-TV reported that an illegal dam (illegal due to its having received no permits from either the TCEQ or U.S. Army Corps of Engineers) had been built on the James River on a plot of land owned by an individual whose company had built 150 miles of Mexico–United States border wall. Upon its discovery TPWD issued a notice of violation letter and the U.S. Army Corps of Engineers issued a cease and desist letter. By April 2024 the dam had been removed.

== See also ==
- List of rivers of Texas
