= Pedernales Electric Cooperative =

Not-for-profit rural electric distribution, utility cooperative

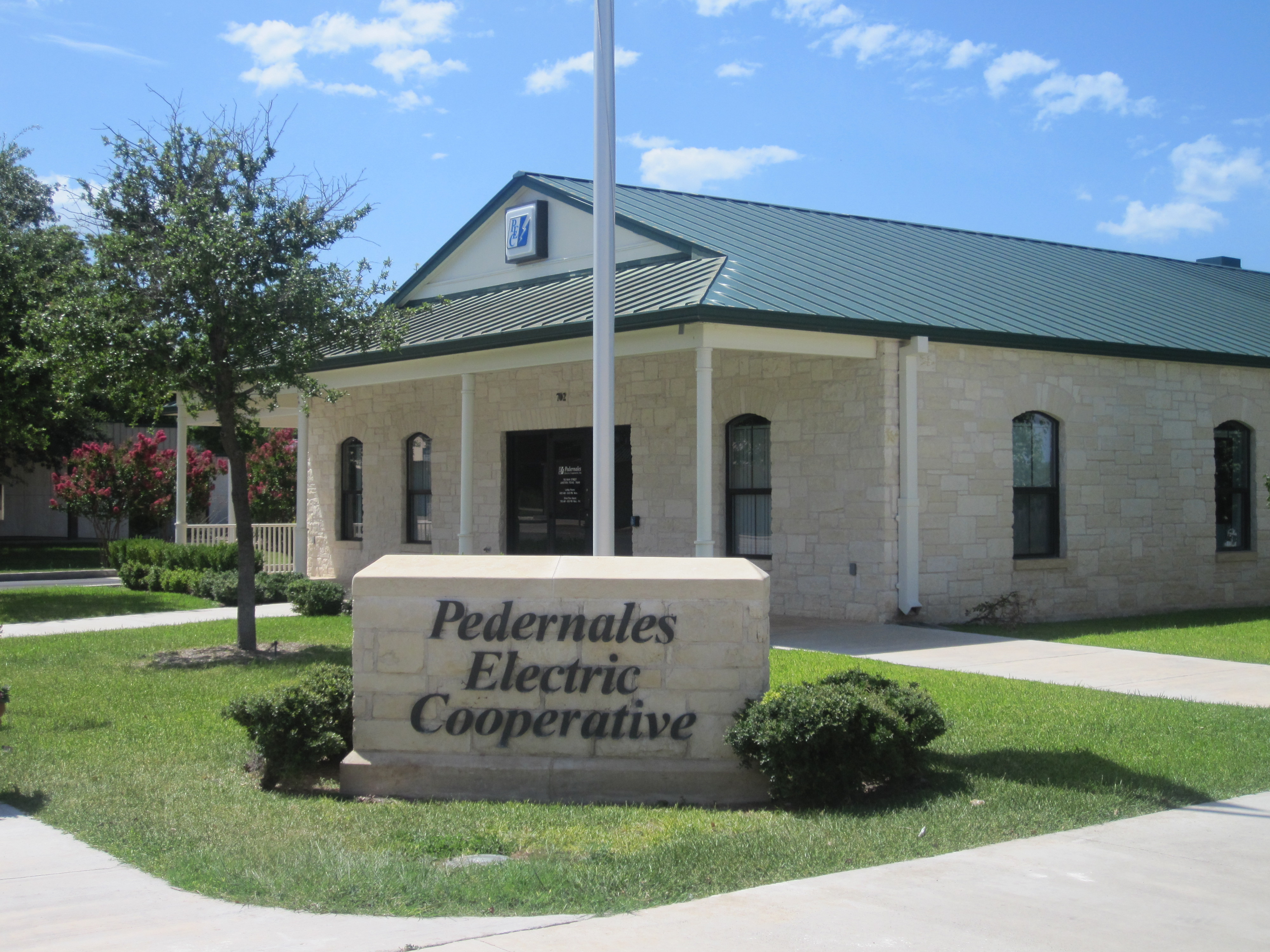
- PEC building in Junction, Texas
- Abbreviation: PEC
- Formation: 1938; 88 years ago
- Founded at: Texas
- Type: Rural electric cooperative
- Legal status: Non-profit
- Purpose: Provide rural electricity in Texas
- Headquarters: Johnson City, Texas
- Location(s): Edwards Plateau, West-central Texas
- Region served: US-TX
- Members: 410,000+
- CEO: Julie Caruthers Parsley
- Affiliations: NRECA
- Website: mypec.com

Pedernales Electric Cooperative is a not-for-profit rural electric distribution, utility cooperative headquartered in Johnson City, Texas, US, set up in 1938.

The cooperative, the nation's largest distribution electric cooperative, is owned by more than 300,000 cooperative members in Central Texas and serves an area of 8,100 square miles (21,000 km^{2}). A 2.25-MW / 4.5-MWh (2-hour) grid battery was installed in Johnson City in 2020.

== Leadership ==
Julie Caruthers Parsley joined Pedernales Electric Cooperative as chief executive officer in 2017. She had been a partner at the law firm Parsley Coffin Renner. She is a former Commissioner of the Public Utility Commission of Texas, and focused her law practice on energy-related legal and consulting services in Texas and the Southwest. She was also Solicitor General of Texas, is board certified in civil appellate law and was an adjunct professor of law teaching appellate practice and procedure at the University of Texas School of Law.

== Board of directors ==
As a cooperative, PEC is owned and governed by its members, who are democratically elected to serve on the cooperative's board of directors. In 2016, the cooperative adopted a single-member district voting methodology in which members vote every three years for their district's director seat.

== See also ==
- Central Texas Electric Cooperative
- Lyndon B. Johnson
- Texas Railroad Commission
- United States energy law
