= Mason High School (Texas) =

Location
- 1105 W College Avenue; Mason, Texas 76856; United States; 30.7433030°N 99.2418244°W

Information
- School type: Public high school
- School district: Mason Independent School District
- Principal: Kade Burns
- Staff: 23.98 (FTE)
- Grades: 9-12
- Enrollment: 210 (2023–2024)
- Student to teacher ratio: 8.76
- Colors: Purple & White
- Athletics conference: UIL Class AA
- Mascot: Puncher Pete
- Website: Mason High School

Mason High School is a public high school located in Mason, Texas, United States. It is part of the Mason Independent School District located in central Mason County and classified as a 2A school by the University Interscholastic League. In 2015, the school was rated "met standard" by the Texas Education Agency.

== Athletics ==
The Mason Punchers compete in these sports:

- Baseball
- Basketball
- Cross-country running
- Football
- Golf
- Softball
- Tennis
- Track and field

=== State titles ===
- Football - - 2011 (1A/D1), 2018 (2A/D1)
- Girls' golf - 2023 (2A), 2024 (2A), 2025 (2A), 2026 (2A)
- One-act play - - 1966 (2A), 2014 (1A), 2015 (2A), 2016 (2A), 2022 (2A)

==== State finalists ====
- One-act play
  - 2013 (1A) - first runner-up
  - 2017 (2A) - second runner-up
  - 2018 (2A) - first runner-up
  - 2021 (2A) - second runner-up
- Football - - 2014 (2A/D1)
