= Mason, Texas =

- City
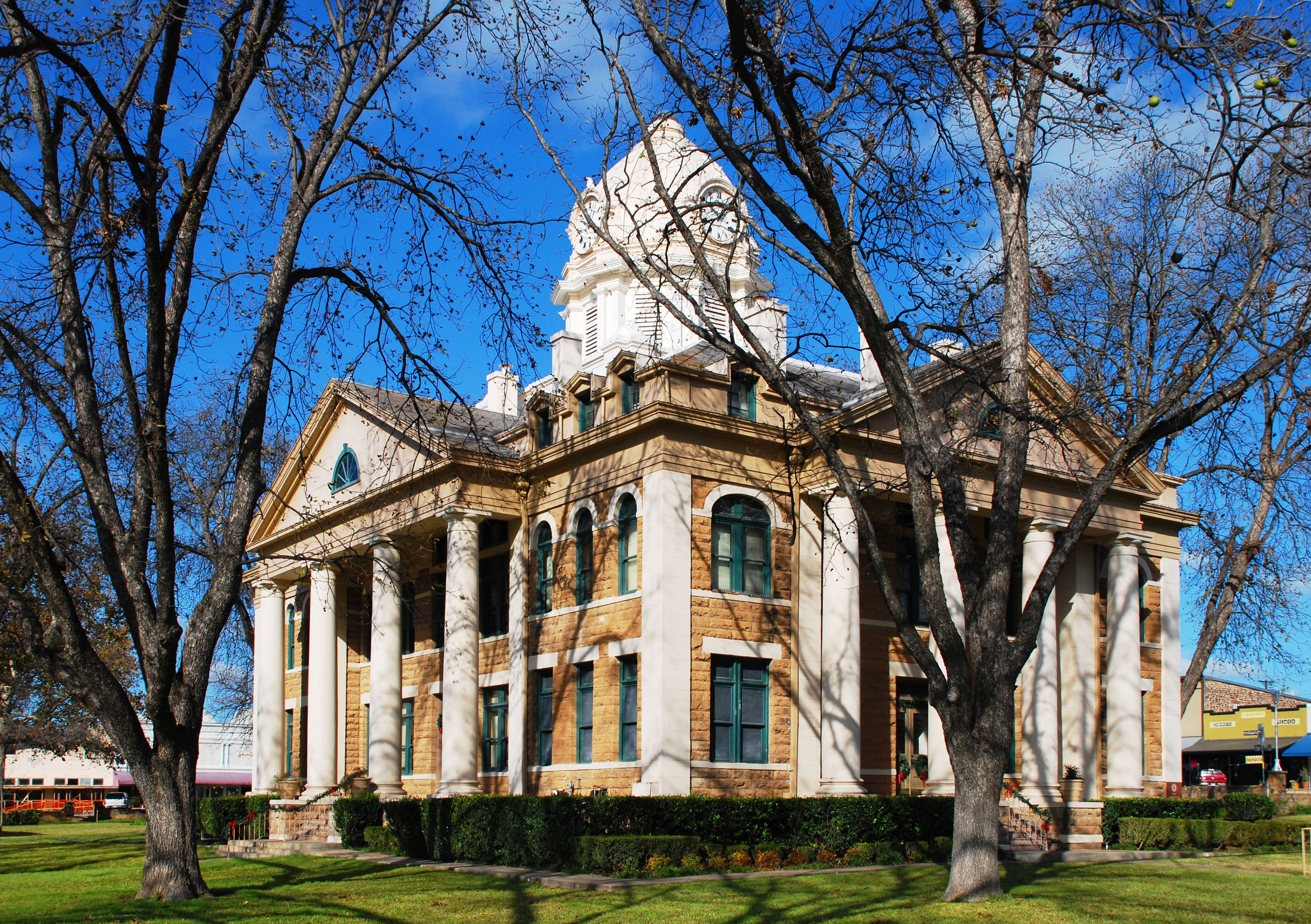
- Mason County Courthouse prior to 2021 fire
- Nickname: Gem of the Hill Country
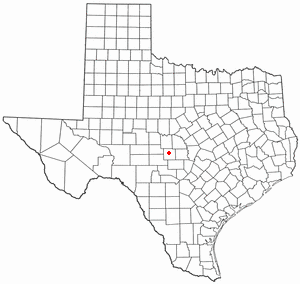
- Location of Mason, Texas

- Location of the City of Mason
- Coordinates: 30°45′05″N 99°14′35″W
- Country: United States
- State: Texas
- County: Mason
- Established: May 20th 1861

Government
  - Type: Mayor/council

Area
  - Total: 3.69 sq mi (9.55 km^{2})
  - Land: 3.65 sq mi (9.46 km^{2})
  - Water: 0.031 sq mi (0.08 km^{2})
- Elevation: 1,529 ft (466 m)

Population (2020)
  - Total: 2,121
  - Density: 581/sq mi (224/km^{2})
- Time zone: UTC-6 (Central (CST))
  - Summer (DST): UTC-5 (CDT)
- ZIP code: 76856
- Area code: 325
- FIPS code: 48-46968
- GNIS feature ID: 2411048
- Website: www.cityofmason.us

Mason is a city in and the county seat of Mason County, Texas, United States. The city is an agricultural community on Comanche Creek southwest of Mason Mountain, on the Edwards Plateau and part of the Llano Uplift. Its population was 2,121 at the 2020 census.

== History ==
The first settler is thought to have been Peter S. Parker in 1846. The settlement of Mason grew up around Fort Mason, which was established by the United States War Department as a front-line defense against Kiowa, Lipan Apache, and Comanche, on July 6, 1851. George W. Todd established a Fort Mason post office March 8, 1858, which became consigned to the civilian settlement on June 26, 1858. The protection and commercial possibilities of the fort drew settlers. W. C. Lewis opened a general store that served soldiers and settlers. In 1860, James E. Ranck opened a second store and later became known as "the Father of Mason". Ben F. Gooch and he began leasing 5,000 acres (20 km^{2}) of land to cotton sharecroppers. Mason was voted the county seat in 1861.

After the Civil War, returning Confederate veterans and German ranchers clashed in 1875 over cattle rustling and other crimes. The resulting killings were known as the "HooDoo Wars". In the midst of the war, Loyal Valley homeowner Tim Williamson was murdered by a dozen masked vigilantes, who accused him of cattle theft. Williamson's adopted son, Texas Ranger Scott Cooley, sought revenge. Cooley and his desperadoes, which included Johnny Ringo, created a reign of terror over the area. During this episode, Ringo committed his first murder, that of James Cheyney.

The first courthouse and jail were built in 1869 of stone walls lined with post oak timbers. After the Hoo Doo War, a new two-story red sandstone jail was built in 1898 by L.T. Noyes of Houston. Noyes was a contractor with Diebold Safe and Lock Company. A courthouse was built in 1875 and burned down in 1877. A new courthouse was built in 1878 and burned down in 1900. The current granite courthouse was erected in 1909 by architect E. H. Hosford and Co. in the Classic Revival style. It burned down in 2021, but courthouse records and most furniture had been removed prior to the fire to prepare for a renovation.

On October 3, 1918, 18 months after United States Congress declared war on Germany, the Mason County Council of Defense drew up a resolution to abandon the use of the German language in the county. Most county residents are of German heritage.

The Broad Street Bridge, a reinforced-concrete truss and the only one of its kind in Texas, was built across the Comanche Creek in 1918. The span is 102 ft long and composed of two 51 ft spans supported by concrete abutments with a pier at the center. The bridge was slated for replacement by the Texas Department of Transportation, but funding was cancelled.

== Geography ==
According to the United States Census Bureau, the city has a total area of 3.7 square miles (9.5 km^{2}), all land.

=== Largest topaz ===
The largest gem-quality topaz found in North America came from Mason County, weighing almost 3 lb (1.4 kg). It had been kept in the Smithsonian Institution and was transferred to Mason's Museum on the Square.

=== Climate ===
Mason experiences a humid subtropical climate (Köppen Cfa), with hot summers and generally mild winters.

Climate data for Mason, Texas, 1991–2020 normals, extremes 1957–present
Month	Jan	Feb	Mar	Apr	May	Jun	Jul	Aug	Sep	Oct	Nov	Dec	Year
Record high °F (°C)	90 (32)	100 (38)	98 (37)	101 (38)	108 (42)	111 (44)	111 (44)	109 (43)	108 (42)	102 (39)	93 (34)	88 (31)	111 (44)
Mean maximum °F (°C)	80.6 (27.0)	83.5 (28.6)	88.5 (31.4)	93.3 (34.1)	97.3 (36.3)	100.3 (37.9)	101.9 (38.8)	102.3 (39.1)	98.2 (36.8)	92.5 (33.6)	85.3 (29.6)	80.1 (26.7)	104.3 (40.2)
Mean daily maximum °F (°C)	61.1 (16.2)	65.3 (18.5)	71.5 (21.9)	79.5 (26.4)	85.5 (29.7)	92.5 (33.6)	95.5 (35.3)	95.8 (35.4)	89.7 (32.1)	80.6 (27.0)	69.9 (21.1)	63.0 (17.2)	79.2 (26.2)
Daily mean °F (°C)	47.3 (8.5)	51.4 (10.8)	58.4 (14.7)	65.6 (18.7)	73.6 (23.1)	80.3 (26.8)	83.1 (28.4)	83.1 (28.4)	76.8 (24.9)	66.9 (19.4)	56.7 (13.7)	49.3 (9.6)	66.0 (18.9)
Mean daily minimum °F (°C)	33.6 (0.9)	37.5 (3.1)	44.8 (7.1)	51.7 (10.9)	61.7 (16.5)	68.0 (20.0)	70.8 (21.6)	70.4 (21.3)	63.8 (17.7)	53.2 (11.8)	43.5 (6.4)	35.6 (2.0)	52.9 (11.6)
Mean minimum °F (°C)	19.1 (−7.2)	22.8 (−5.1)	26.2 (−3.2)	35.1 (1.7)	46.0 (7.8)	58.7 (14.8)	64.3 (17.9)	63.0 (17.2)	50.1 (10.1)	36.4 (2.4)	26.3 (−3.2)	20.8 (−6.2)	16.4 (−8.7)
Record low °F (°C)	6 (−14)	3 (−16)	11 (−12)	25 (−4)	36 (2)	46 (8)	54 (12)	51 (11)	36 (2)	26 (−3)	14 (−10)	3 (−16)	3 (−16)
Average precipitation inches (mm)	1.32 (34)	1.88 (48)	2.15 (55)	2.30 (58)	4.21 (107)	3.80 (97)	2.30 (58)	2.01 (51)	3.03 (77)	2.58 (66)	1.94 (49)	1.38 (35)	28.90 (734)
Average snowfall inches (cm)	0.1 (0.25)	0.0 (0.0)	0.0 (0.0)	0.0 (0.0)	0.0 (0.0)	0.0 (0.0)	0.0 (0.0)	0.0 (0.0)	0.0 (0.0)	0.0 (0.0)	0.0 (0.0)	0.1 (0.25)	0.2 (0.5)
Average precipitation days (≥ 0.01 in)	5.2	5.5	6.2	5.3	7.7	6.1	4.9	4.4	6.1	5.3	4.8	5.3	66.8
Average snowy days (≥ 0.1 in)	0.0	0.0	0.0	0.0	0.0	0.0	0.0	0.0	0.0	0.0	0.0	0.1	0.1
Source 1: NOAA
Source 2: National Weather Service

== Demographics ==
Historical population
Census	Pop.	Note	%±
1870	296		—
1880	575		94.3%
1950	2,456		—
1960	1,910		−22.2%
1970	1,806		−5.4%
1980	2,153		19.2%
1990	2,041		−5.2%
2000	2,134		4.6%
2010	2,114		−0.9%
2020	2,121		0.3%
U.S. Decennial Census

=== 2020 census ===
As of the 2020 census, Mason had a population of 2,121, 921 households, and 463 families. The median age was 46.2 years; 23.2% of the residents were under 18 and 26.4% were 65 or older. The female/male ratio was 1:0.944 overall and f1:0.877 males for those 18 and over.

None of the residents lived in urban areas, while 100.0% lived in rural areas.

Of the 921 households in Mason, 29.2% had children under 18 living in them, 45.9% were married-couple households, 19.7% were households with a male householder and no spouse or partner present, and 31.8% were households with a female householder and no spouse or partner present. About 34.7% of all households were made up of individuals, and 20.8% had someone living alone who was 65 or older.

The city had 1,037 housing units, of which 11.2% were vacant. The homeowner vacancy rate was 0.7% and the rental vacancy rate was 10.1%.

Racial composition as of the 2020 census
Race	Number	Percentage
White	1,579	74.4%
Black or African American	5	0.2%
American Indian and Alaska Native	13	0.6%
Asian	0	0.0%
Native Hawaiian and other Pacific Islander	0	0.0%
Some other race	203	9.6%
Two or more races	321	15.1%
Hispanic or Latino (of any race)	663	31.3%

=== 2000 census ===
As of the 2000 census, 2,134 people, 914 households, and 585 families resided in the city. The population density was 579.7 inhabitants per square mile (223.8/km^{2}). The 1,103 housing units averaged 299.6/sq mi (115.7/km^{2}). The racial makeup of the city was 58.1% White, 0.19% African American, 0.61% Native American, 0.05% Asian, 8.25% from other races, and 2.76% from two or more races. Hispanics or Latinos of any race were 30.04% of the population.

Of the 914 households, 28.0% had children under 18 living with them, 50.3% were married couples living together, 10.5% had a female householder with no husband present, and 35.9% were not families. About 34.0% of all households were made up of individuals, and 22.8% had someone living alone who was 65 or older. The average household size was 2.30, and the average family size was 2.94.

In the city, the population was distributed as 24.3% under 18, 5.2% from 18 to 24, 21.8% from 25 to 44, 25.3% from 45 to 64, and 23.5% who were 65 years of age or older. The median age was 44 years. For every 100 females, there were 85.2 males. For every 100 females age 18 and over, there were 79.4 males.

The median income in the city for a household was $26,344 and for a family was $39,310. Males had a median income of $26,736 versus $14,461 for females. The per capita income for the city was $16,525. About 15.9% of families and 18.2% of the population were below the poverty line, including 26.9% of those under 18 and 19.7% of those 65 or over.

== Education ==
The city of Mason is served by the Mason Independent School District and home to the Mason High School Punchers and Cowgirls.

== Infrastructure ==
- U.S. Highway 87
- Texas State Highway 29
- Ranch to Market Road 1871
- Ranch to Market Road 386

== Notable people ==
- Jacob Bickler (1849–1902) German immigrant, founder of two Austin academies
- Fred Gipson (1908–1973), author of Old Yeller
- Herman Lehmann (1859–1932) German immigrant, captured as a child by Native Americans
- Anna Mebus Martin (1820–1864) businesswoman and rancher
- Rebecca Tobey (born 1948), American artist of animal sculptures
- Hugh Wolfe (1912–2010), football player

== See also ==
- Central Texas Electric Cooperative
