= Kimble County, Texas =

County in Texas, United States

- County
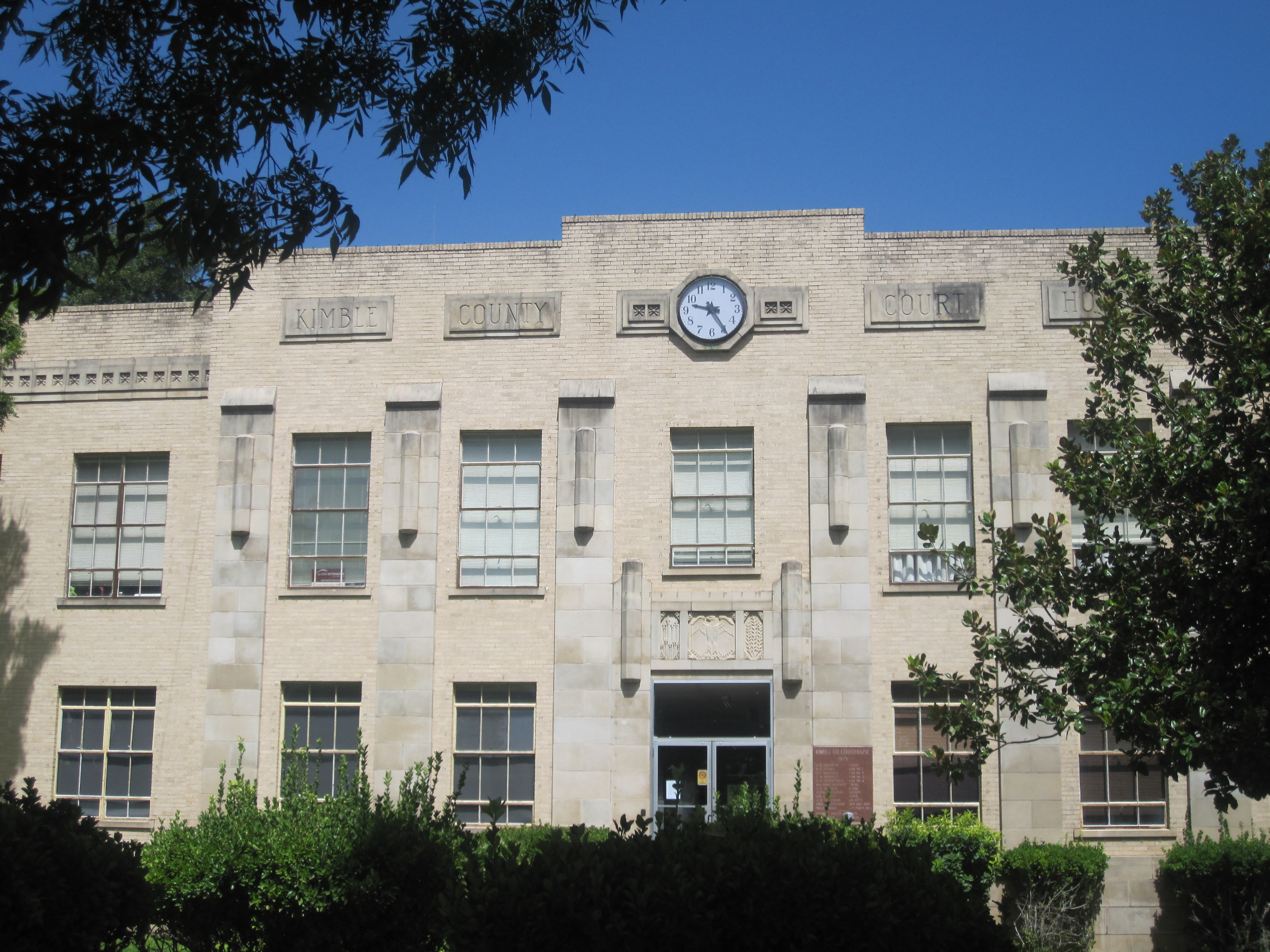
- The Kimble County Courthouse in Junction

- Location within the U.S. state of Texas
- Coordinates: 30°29′N 99°45′W
- Country: United States
- State: Texas
- Founded: 1876
- Named for: George C. Kimble
- Seat: Junction
- Largest city: Junction

Area
  - Total: 1,251 sq mi (3,240 km^{2})
  - Land: 1,251 sq mi (3,240 km^{2})
  - Water: 0.2 sq mi (0.52 km^{2}) 0.02%

Population (2020)
  - Total: 4,286
  - Estimate (2025): 4,438 ▲
  - Density: 3.426/sq mi (1.323/km^{2})
- Time zone: UTC−6 (Central)
  - Summer (DST): UTC−5 (CDT)
- Congressional district: 11th
- Website: www.co.kimble.tx.us

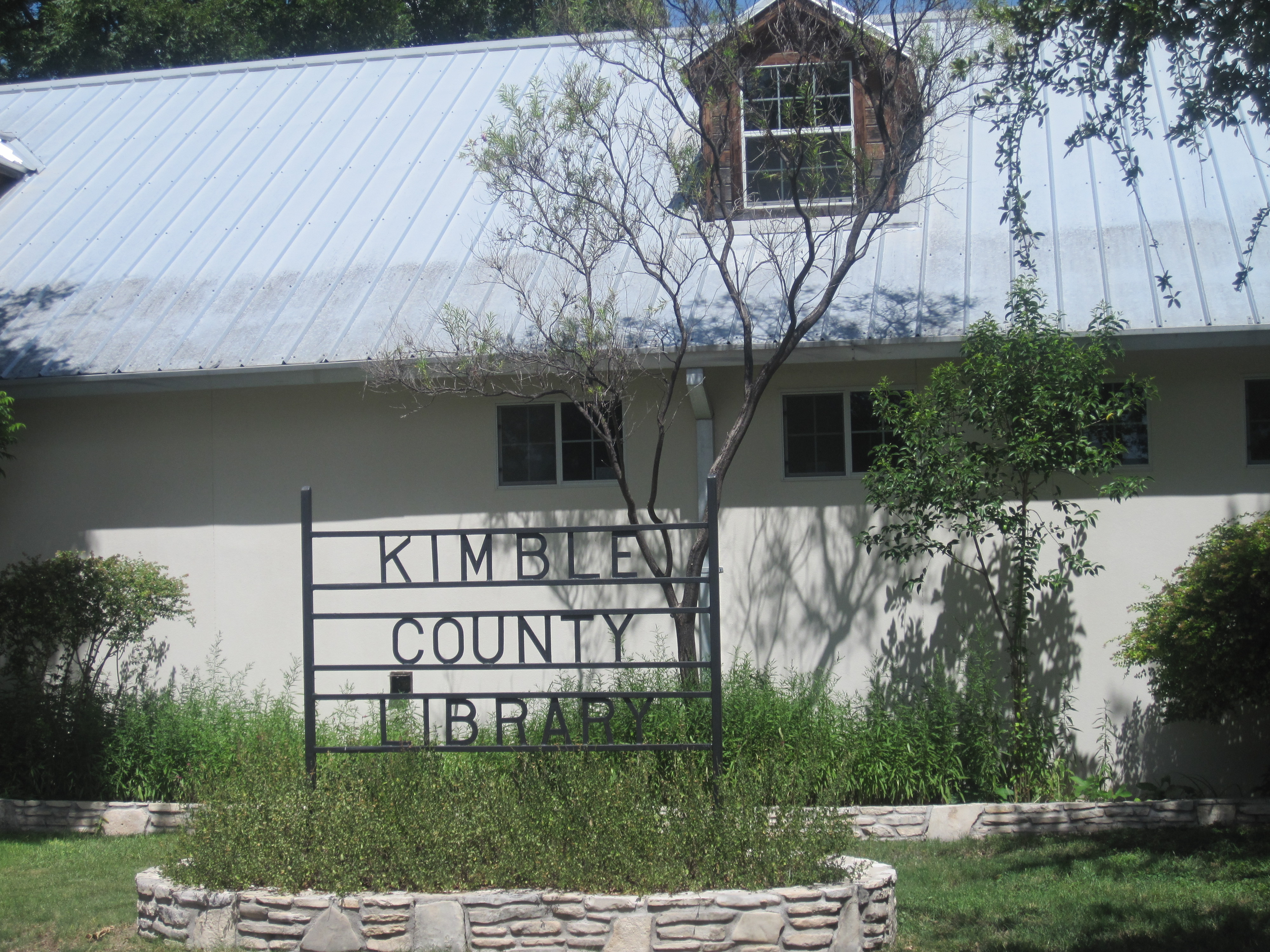
Kimble County Library in Junction contains the museum of the late U.S. Representative O.C. Fisher.

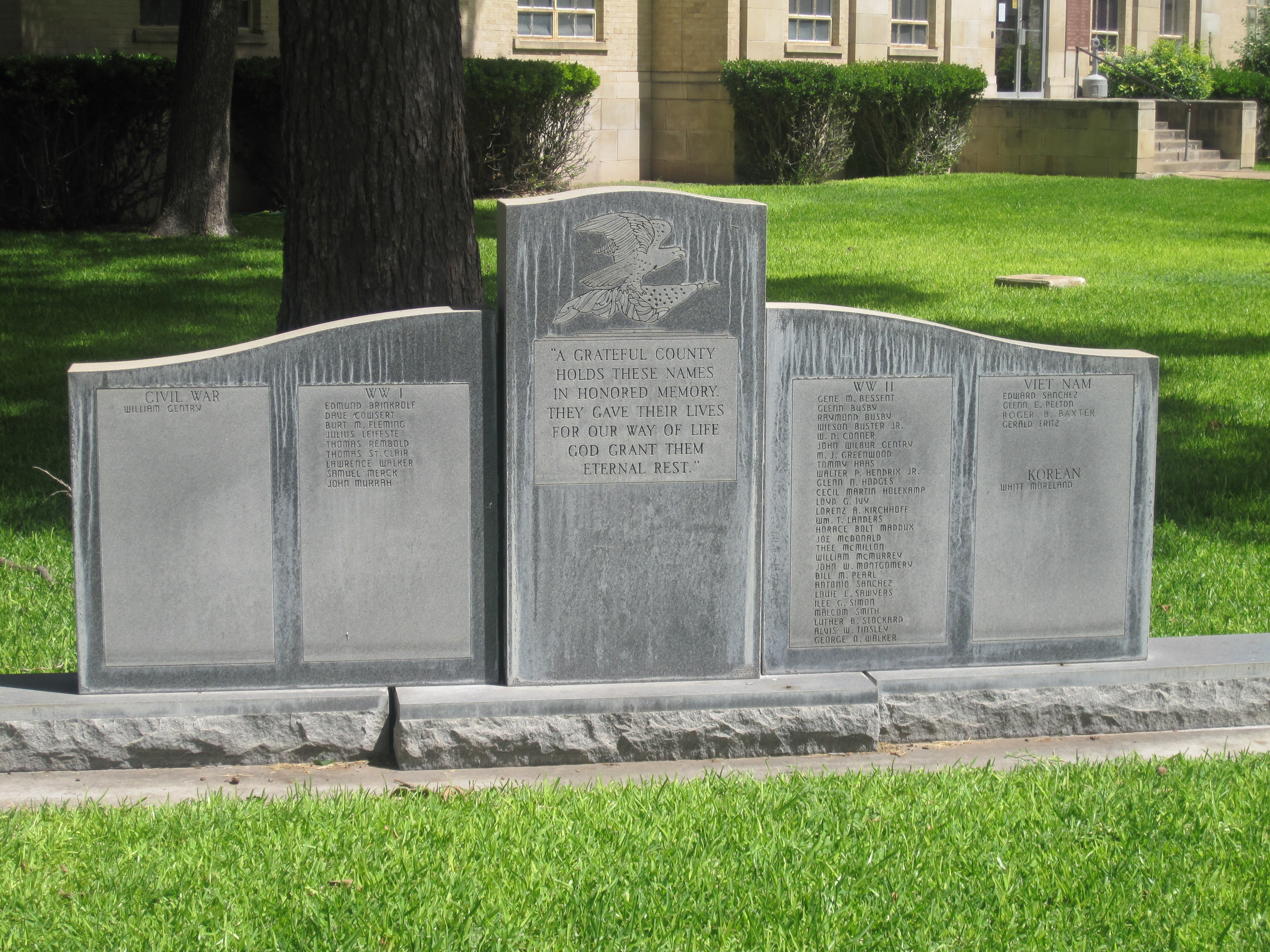
Veterans Memorial at Kimble County Courthouse

Kimble County is a county located on the Edwards Plateau in the U.S. state of Texas. As of the 2020 census, its population was 4,286. Its county seat is Junction. The county was created in 1858 and organized in 1876. It is named for George C. Kimble, who died at the Battle of the Alamo.

== History ==
=== Early years ===
Prior to the arrival of foreign settlers, the area that later became Kimble County was inhabited by several Native American groups, including the Comanche, Kiowa, Kiowa Apache, and Lipan Apache. The first Europeans to encounter the area were the Spanish, who led several campaigns against the local Indian tribes in the mid-18th century. In 1808, Spanish Captain Francisco Amangual commanded a military expedition from San Antonio to Santa Fe and mapped a road, which passed through what is now Kimble County. The area was first mentioned in Republic of Texas documents in 1842, when about 416,000 acres of the present county were included in the Fisher–Miller Land Grant, which extended from the Llano River to the Colorado River.

=== Settlement and formation ===
The earliest settlers began arriving in the late 1850s. One of the first was Raleigh Gentry, who settled along Bear Creek around 1857. The Gentry family consisted of Raleigh, his wife, and their several adult sons. Another early settler was James Bradbury Sr., who moved to the area from Williamson County and chose a site along the banks of the South Llano River. Others settled in the Big and Little Saline valleys. Two of the Gentry's sons were later killed, one by Indians and the other during the Civil War. Bradbury was also killed by Indians during what was known as the Battle of Bradbury Hills.

The Texas Legislature enacted legislation on January 22, 1858, creating Kimble County from what was previously part of Bexar County. The new county was named for Lieutenant George C. Kimble (sometimes spelled Kimbell), who died during the Battle of the Alamo. From 1858 to 1875, Kimble County was attached to Gillespie County for judicial purposes.

Meanwhile, several settlements sprang up along the Johnson Fork of the Llano River, near Copperas Creek, and in the valleys of the James River after the Civil War. Throughout the 1870s, the lightly populated settlements of Kimble County faced raids by Comanches, as well as Lipans and Kickapoos, who used Mexico as their base. The county became a popular haven for outlaws who used the area's hilly terrain and dense cedar breaks as hideouts.

On September 6, 1875, Kimble County was separated from Gillespie County and attached to Menard County for judicial purposes.

=== County organization ===
Nearly 18 years after its creation, Kimble County was officially organized on January 3, 1876. William Potter was the county's first judge. That spring, the towns of Kimbleville and Denman (quickly changed to Junction City) were founded. Kimbleville was designated the first county seat. During the first district court session, however, the seat was moved to Junction City. Kimbleville soon disappeared largely due to its location in a flood-prone area of the county. Other communities were formed during the latter half of the 19th century, including London, Noxville, Roosevelt, Segovia, Telegraph, and Viejo (later Cleo).

=== Growth era ===
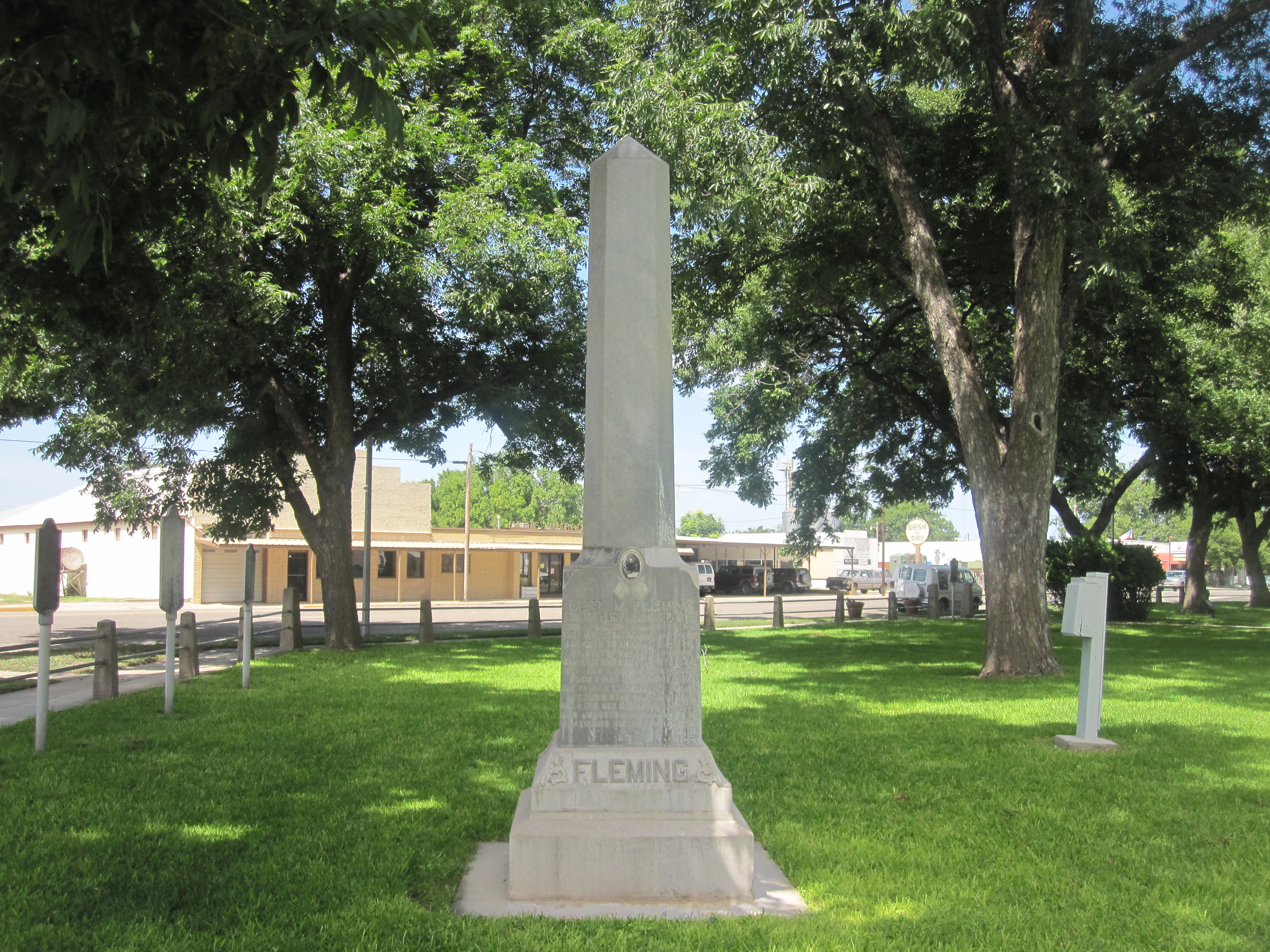
Obelisk monument to Burt M. Fleming (1894-1918), cited for bravery in World War I, is located on the lawn of the Kimble County courthouse.

The population of Kimble County rose from 72 in 1870 to 1,343 in 1880. In 1878, a courthouse was erected in Junction City. The structure was destroyed, along with all of the county records, in an 1884 fire. The replacement, a two-story stone building, was partially destroyed by fire in 1888, but was repaired and remained in operation until the present courthouse was constructed in 1929. The census of 1890 recorded 2,243 people and 279 farms and ranches in the county. The raising of cattle and sheep soon dominated the economy. In 1894, the county seat of Junction City became known simply as Junction.

Kimble County continued to grow during the early 20th century. The population in 1900 was 2,503. The 20th century brought many amenities to the county that were previously unavailable. Four Mile Dam was completed in 1904. The first telephone system came to Junction in 1905, and the first banks opened a year later. Electric lights came to Junction in 1917 and gas stations were introduced soon after.

A county-wide bond election to fund the construction of gravel and paved roads was approved in 1919. By 1922, State Highway 27 was a working unpaved road. It ran through Junction, southeast to Kerrville, and west to Sonora. State Highways 4 and 29 were also operational. State Highway 29 extended through the communities of London and Telegraph by 1930. Most Kimble County roads had been paved by the late 1940s. Old Highways 4 and 27 became U.S. Highway 83, Highway 27 became U.S. Highway 290, and Highway 29 became U.S. Highway 377.

Junction was officially incorporated in 1927. In the late 1920s, Kimble County had become one of the state's leaders in the wool and mohair industry. Various aspects of agricultural production continued to dominate the local economy, however.

Unemployment increased in the county during the Great Depression, but the population rose throughout the 1930s and stood at 5,064 by the 1940 census. Electricity was introduced to rural Kimble County in April 1945. In the mid-1940s, the economy diversified as a small amount of oil production was introduced, along with the limited production of sand, gravel, and gas.

=== Modern times ===
After peaking in 1940, the population began to decline during the postwar period. Kimble County lost 715 people or 15% of its population between 1950 and 1970. A small recovery was registered by 1980 that continued through 2000.

== Geography ==
According to the U.S. Census Bureau, the county has a total area of 1,251 square miles (3,240 km^{2}), of which 1,251 square miles (3,240 km^{2}) are land and 0.2 square miles (0.52 km^{2}) (0.02%) is covered by water.

Kimble County has the highest natural point in the Texas Hill Country at 2,460 feet (750 m) above sea level.

=== Major highways ===
- Interstate 10
- U.S. Highway 83
- U.S. Highway 290
- U.S. Highway 377
- Loop 291
- Loop 481

=== Adjacent counties ===
- Menard County (north)
- Mason County (northeast)
- Gillespie County (east)
- Kerr County (southeast)
- Edwards County (southwest)
- Sutton County (west)
- Schleicher County (northwest)

== Demographics ==
Historical population
Census	Pop.	Note	%±
1870	72		—
1880	1,343		1,765.3%
1890	2,243		67.0%
1900	2,503		11.6%
1910	3,261		30.3%
1920	3,581		9.8%
1930	4,119		15.0%
1940	5,064		22.9%
1950	4,619		−8.8%
1960	3,943		−14.6%
1970	3,904		−1.0%
1980	4,063		4.1%
1990	4,122		1.5%
2000	4,468		8.4%
2010	4,607		3.1%
2020	4,286		−7.0%
2025 (est.)	4,438	▲	3.5%
U.S. Decennial Census; 1850–2010 2010 2020

=== 2020 census ===
As of the 2020 census, the county had a population of 4,286, a median age of 51.8 years, 17.0% of residents were under the age of 18, and 29.9% were 65 years of age or older. For every 100 females there were 97.9 males, and for every 100 females age 18 and over there were 94.6 males age 18 and over.

There were 1,949 households in the county, of which 23.0% had children under the age of 18 living in them; 47.3% were married-couple households, 21.1% were households with a male householder and no spouse or partner present, and 27.2% were households with a female householder and no spouse or partner present. About 32.4% of all households were made up of individuals and 18.6% had someone living alone who was 65 years of age or older.

There were 2,767 housing units, of which 29.6% were vacant; 75.8% of occupied housing units were owner-occupied and 24.2% were renter-occupied, with homeowner and rental vacancy rates of 2.1% and 5.6%, respectively.

<0.1% of residents lived in urban areas, while 100.0% lived in rural areas.

=== Racial and ethnic composition ===
Kimble County, Texas – Racial and ethnic composition Note: the US Census treats Hispanic/Latino as an ethnic category. This table excludes Latinos from the racial categories and assigns them to a separate category. Hispanics/Latinos may be of any race.
Race / Ethnicity (NH = Non-Hispanic)	Pop 1980	Pop 1990	Pop 2000	Pop 2010	Pop 2020	% 1980	% 1990	% 2000	% 2010	% 2020
White alone (NH)	3,350	3,330	3,481	3,450	3,136	82.45%	80.79%	77.91%	74.89%	73.17%
Black or African American alone (NH)	2	2	3	16	8	0.05%	0.05%	0.07%	0.35%	0.19%
Native American or Alaska Native alone (NH)	2	5	10	17	14	0.05%	0.12%	0.22%	0.37%	0.33%
Asian alone (NH)	1	2	20	19	33	0.02%	0.05%	0.45%	0.41%	0.77%
Native Hawaiian or Pacific Islander alone (NH)	x	x	1	3	3	x	x	0.02%	0.07%	0.07%
Other race alone (NH)	1	11	4	6	8	0.02%	0.27%	0.09%	0.13%	0.19%
Mixed race or Multiracial (NH)	x	x	23	19	98	x	x	0.51%	0.41%	2.29%
Hispanic or Latino (any race)	707	772	926	1,077	986	17.40%	18.73%	20.73%	23.38%	23.01%
Total	4,063	4,122	4,468	4,607	4,286	100.00%	100.00%	100.00%	100.00%	100.00%

=== 2000 census ===
As of the 2000 census, 4,468 people, 1,866 households, and 1,285 families resided in the county. The population density was 4 people per square mile (1.5 people/km^{2}). The 2,996 housing units averaged 2 units per square mile (0.77/km^{2}). The racial makeup of the county was 90.29% White, 0.09% African American, 0.34% Native American, 0.45% Asian, 0.02% Pacific Islander, 7.48% from other races, and 1.34% from two or more races. About 20.73% of the population was Hispanic or Latino of any race.

Of the 1,866 households, 28.20% had children under the age of 18 living with them, 57.20% were married couples living together, 8.60% had a female householder with no husband present, and 31.10% were not families. Around 28.60% of all households were made up of individuals, and 16.00% had someone living alone who was 65 years of age or older. The average household size was 2.37 and the average family size was 2.90.

In the county, the population was distributed as 23.60% under the age of 18, 6.00% from 18 to 24, 22.60% from 25 to 44, 26.90% from 45 to 64, and 20.90% who were 65 years of age or older. The median age was 43 years. For every 100 females, there were 92.70 males. For every 100 females age 18 and over, there were 90.50 males.

The median income for a household in the county was $29,396, and for a family was $34,966. Males had a median income of $24,844 versus $20,431 for females. The per capita income for the county was $17,127. About 13.40% of families and 18.80% of the population were below the poverty line, including 28.80% of those under age 18 and 14.20% of those age 65 or over.

== Education ==
The Junction Independent School District serves most of Kimble County, including the city of Junction and the communities of London, Roosevelt, and Telegraph. The southeastern portion of the county is part of the Harper Independent School District, which is headquartered in the Gillespie County community of Harper. Also, a small portion of the county lies within the Mason Independent School District.

== Communities ==
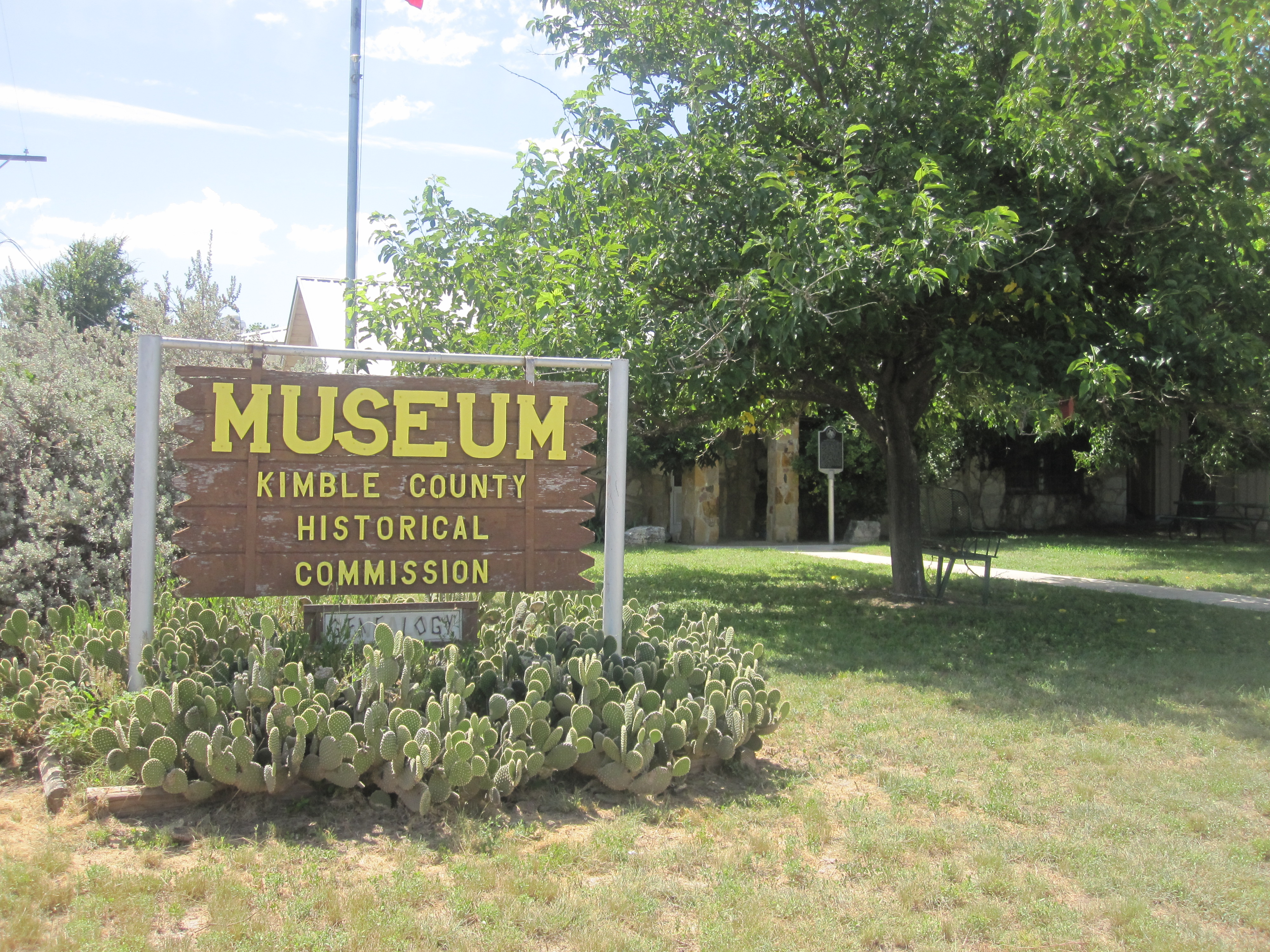
Kimble County Museum sign

=== City ===
- Junction (county seat)

=== Unincorporated communities ===
- London
- Roosevelt
- Segovia

=== Ghost towns ===
- Noxville
- Telegraph

== Politics ==
Kimble County has voted predominantly Republican at the presidential level from 1952, the lone exception being 1964, when native son Lyndon B. Johnson won in a landslide over Barry Goldwater. As with most other areas in the Solid South, the county had been a Democratic stronghold through 1948.

United States presidential election results for Kimble County, Texas
Year	Republican		Democratic		Third party(ies)	
Year	No.	%	No.	%	No.	%
1912	19	9.90%	133	69.27%	40	20.83%
1916	13	5.22%	223	89.56%	13	5.22%
1920	150	30.55%	299	60.90%	42	8.55%
1924	223	31.54%	465	65.77%	19	2.69%
1928	660	80.39%	157	19.12%	4	0.49%
1932	121	11.93%	890	87.77%	3	0.30%
1936	151	18.13%	681	81.75%	1	0.12%
1940	219	16.39%	1,117	83.61%	0	0.00%
1944	225	18.04%	880	70.57%	142	11.39%
1948	303	24.24%	851	68.08%	96	7.68%
1952	1,077	67.10%	525	32.71%	3	0.19%
1956	821	62.82%	484	37.03%	2	0.15%
1960	699	55.79%	550	43.89%	4	0.32%
1964	520	37.60%	862	62.33%	1	0.07%
1968	640	46.78%	463	33.85%	265	19.37%
1972	971	78.12%	266	21.40%	6	0.48%
1976	846	51.84%	759	46.51%	27	1.65%
1980	1,011	61.24%	608	36.83%	32	1.94%
1984	1,333	74.72%	442	24.78%	9	0.50%
1988	1,061	65.62%	551	34.08%	5	0.31%
1992	790	48.98%	467	28.95%	356	22.07%
1996	898	57.45%	521	33.33%	144	9.21%
2000	1,313	78.81%	328	19.69%	25	1.50%
2004	1,482	81.61%	324	17.84%	10	0.55%
2008	1,487	80.68%	342	18.56%	14	0.76%
2012	1,667	88.11%	217	11.47%	8	0.42%
2016	1,697	86.94%	206	10.55%	49	2.51%
2020	1,987	86.69%	284	12.39%	21	0.92%
2024	2,126	88.44%	261	10.86%	17	0.71%

United States Senate election results for Kimble County, Texas1
Year	Republican		Democratic		Third party(ies)	
Year	No.	%	No.	%	No.	%
2024	2,039	85.71%	298	12.53%	42	1.77%

United States Senate election results for Kimble County, Texas2
Year	Republican		Democratic		Third party(ies)	
Year	No.	%	No.	%	No.	%
2020	1,962	87.08%	254	11.27%	37	1.64%

Texas Gubernatorial election results for Kimble County
Year	Republican		Democratic		Third party(ies)	
Year	No.	%	No.	%	No.	%
2022	1,666	88.81%	188	10.02%	22	1.17%

== Education ==
School districts include:

- Harper Independent School District
- Junction Independent School District
- Mason Independent School District

All of Kimble County is in the service area of Howard County Junior College District.

== See also ==
- Adelsverein
- German Texan
- List of museums in Central Texas
- National Register of Historic Places listings in Kimble County, Texas
- Recorded Texas Historic Landmarks in Kimble County
- Coke R. Stevenson
- Andrew Murr
- Ivy Chapel
