= Harper Independent School District =

School district in Texas, United States

Address
- 61 North Ranch Road 783 Harper, TX, 78631; United States

District information
- Grades: PK–12
- Schools: 3
- NCES District ID: 4822590

Students and staff
- Students: 612 (2023–2024)
- Teachers: 47.84 (on an FTE basis)
- Student–teacher ratio: 12.79:1

Other information
- Website: www.harperisd.net

Harper Independent School District is a public school district based in the community of Harper. Located in Gillespie County, the district extends into portions of Kerr and Kimble counties.

Harper ISD has three campuses - Harper High (Grades 9-12), Harper Middle (Grades 6-8), and Harper Elementary (Grades PK-5).

In 2009, the school district was rated "recognized" by the Texas Education Agency. In 2010, the school district was rated "exemplary" by the Texas Education Agency.
