= Mason Independent School District =

School district in Mason, Texas, USA

Mason Independent School District is a public school district based in Mason, Texas, United States. The district serves most of Mason County and extends into small portions of Kimble, McCulloch, Menard, and San Saba Counties.

In 2009, the school district was rated "recognized" by the Texas Education Agency.

== Schools ==
- Mason High School (grades 9-12) (The mascot is the Puncher, short for "cowpuncher", which is a slang name for cowboy; girls' teams are called Cowgirls.)
- Mason Junior High (grades 5-8)
- Mason Elementary (prekindergarten-grade 4)
