= Junction Independent School District =

School district in Texas

Coordinates: 30.4883°N 99.7777°W

Junction Independent School District is a public school district based in Junction, Texas (USA).

== Schools ==
- Junction High School
- Junction Middle School
- Junction Elementary School

In 2009, the school district was rated "academically acceptable" by the Texas Education Agency.
