= Harper, Texas =

- Census-designated place
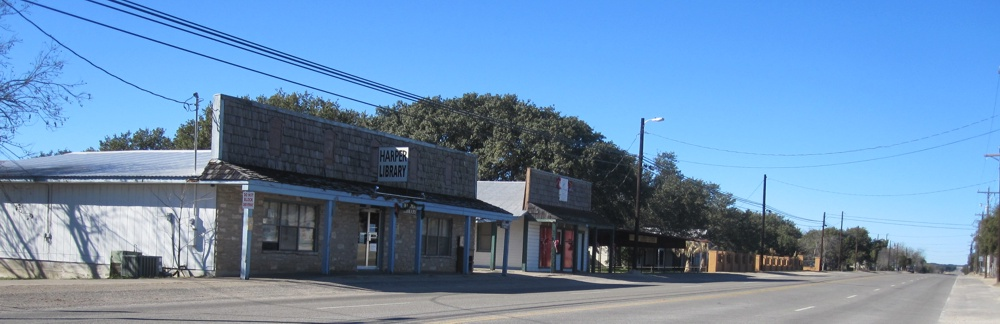

- Harper, Texas Harper (the United States)
- Coordinates: 30°18′04″N 99°14′56″W
- Country: United States
- State: Texas
- County: Gillespie

Area
  - Total: 56.6 sq mi (146.7 km^{2})
  - Land: 56.6 sq mi (146.5 km^{2})
  - Water: 0.077 sq mi (0.2 km^{2})
- Elevation: 2,021 ft (616 m)

Population (2020)
  - Total: 1,332
  - Density: 23.55/sq mi (9.092/km^{2})
- Time zone: UTC-6 (Central (CST))
  - Summer (DST): UTC-5 (CDT)
- ZIP code: 78631
- Area code: 830
- FIPS code: 48-32456
- GNIS feature ID: 2408352

Harper is an unincorporated community and census-designated place (CDP), located 23 miles (37 km) west of Fredericksburg on U.S. Highway 290, in Gillespie County, in the U.S. state of Texas. The population was 1,332 at the 2020 census.

== History ==
On December 15, 1847, a petition was submitted to create Gillespie County. In 1848, the legislature formed Gillespie County from Bexar and Travis Counties. While the signers were overwhelmingly German immigrants, names also on the petition were Castillo, Pena, Munos, and a handful of Anglo names.

The first white settlers were the families of Eli McDonald and Matthew Taylor in 1863. A historical marker just south of U.S. Highway 290 commemorates the McDonald massacre of August 1864. This incident involved the killing of two family members and the kidnapping of five more by Kiowa Indians.

A post office was established in 1883 by George Franklin Harper, for whom the town was named. By 1985, the town served a large ranching area and had six churches, a fire department and ambulance services, a public school, and growing residential subdivisions. The population of the area exceeded 1,000 by 2000.

== Geography ==
Harper is located in western Gillespie County, about 84 miles (135 km) northwest of San Antonio and 101 miles (163 km) west of Austin.

According to the United States Census Bureau, the CDP has a total area of 56.6 square miles (146.7 km^{2}), of which 56.6 square miles (146.5 km^{2}) are land and 0.1 square miles (0.2 km^{2}), or 0.14%, is covered by water. The headwaters of the Pedernales River flow through the community.

=== Climate ===
The climate in this area is characterized by hot, humid summers and generally mild to cool winters. According to the Köppen climate classification system, Harper has a humid subtropical climate, Cfa on climate maps.

== Demographics ==
Historical population
| Census | Pop. | Note | %± |
|---|---|---|---|
| 2000 | 1,006 | | — |
| 2010 | 1,192 | | 18.5% |
| 2020 | 1,332 | | 11.7% |
U.S. Decennial Census; 1850–1900 1910; 1920 1930 1940; 1950 1960 1970; 1980 1990 2000; 2010 2020

Harper first appeared as a census designated place in the 2000 U.S. census.

=== 2020 census ===
Harper CDP, Texas – Racial and ethnic composition Note: the US Census treats Hispanic/Latino as an ethnic category. This table excludes Latinos from the racial categories and assigns them to a separate category. Hispanics/Latinos may be of any race.
| Race / Ethnicity (NH = Non-Hispanic) | Pop 2000 | Pop 2010 | Pop 2020 | % 2000 | % 2010 | % 2020 |
|---|---|---|---|---|---|---|
| White alone (NH) | 942 | 1,035 | 1,077 | 93.64% | 86.83% | 80.86% |
| Black or African American alone (NH) | 1 | 4 | 7 | 0.10% | 0.34% | 0.53% |
| Native American or Alaska Native alone (NH) | 6 | 7 | 7 | 0.60% | 0.59% | 0.53% |
| Asian alone (NH) | 1 | 1 | 0 | 0.10% | 0.08% | 0.00% |
| Native Hawaiian or Pacific Islander alone (NH) | 0 | 0 | 1 | 0.00% | 0.00% | 0.08% |
| Other race alone (NH) | 0 | 3 | 5 | 0.00% | 0.25% | 0.38% |
| Mixed race or Multiracial (NH) | 6 | 6 | 35 | 0.60% | 0.50% | 2.63% |
| Hispanic or Latino (any race) | 50 | 136 | 200 | 4.97% | 11.41% | 15.02% |
| Total | 1,006 | 1,192 | 1,332 | 100.00% | 100.00% | 100.00% |

=== 2000 census ===
As of the census of 2000, 1,006 people, 417 households, and 293 families resided in the CDP. The population density was 17.8 people per square mile (6.9/km^{2}). The 536 housing units averaged 9.5/sq mi (3.7/km^{2}). The racial makeup of the CDP was 95.73% White, 0.10% African American, 0.80% Native American, 0.10% Asian, 2.39% from other races, and 0.89% from two or more races. Hispanics or Latinos of any race were 4.97% of the population.

Of the 417 households, 30.5% had children under the age of 18 living with them, 62.4% were married couples living together, 6.2% had a female householder with no husband present, and 29.5% were not families; 27.1% of all households were made up of individuals, and 13.4% had someone living alone who was 65 years of age or older. The average household size was 2.41 and the average family size was 2.93.

In the CDP, the population was distributed as 25.0% under the age of 18, 4.8% from 18 to 24, 24.6% from 25 to 44, 27.5% from 45 to 64, and 18.2% who were 65 years of age or older. The median age was 41 years. For every 100 females, there were 93.5 males. For every 100 females age 18 and over, there were 93.1 males.

The median income for a household in the CDP was $31,776, and for a family was $39,013. Males had a median income of $26,900 versus $23,421 for females. The per capita income for the CDP was $15,318. About 10.8% of families and 17.3% of the population were below the poverty line, including 22.5% of those under age 18 and 10.7% of those age 65 or over.

== Education ==
Harper is served by the Harper Independent School District.
