= Junction, Texas =

- City
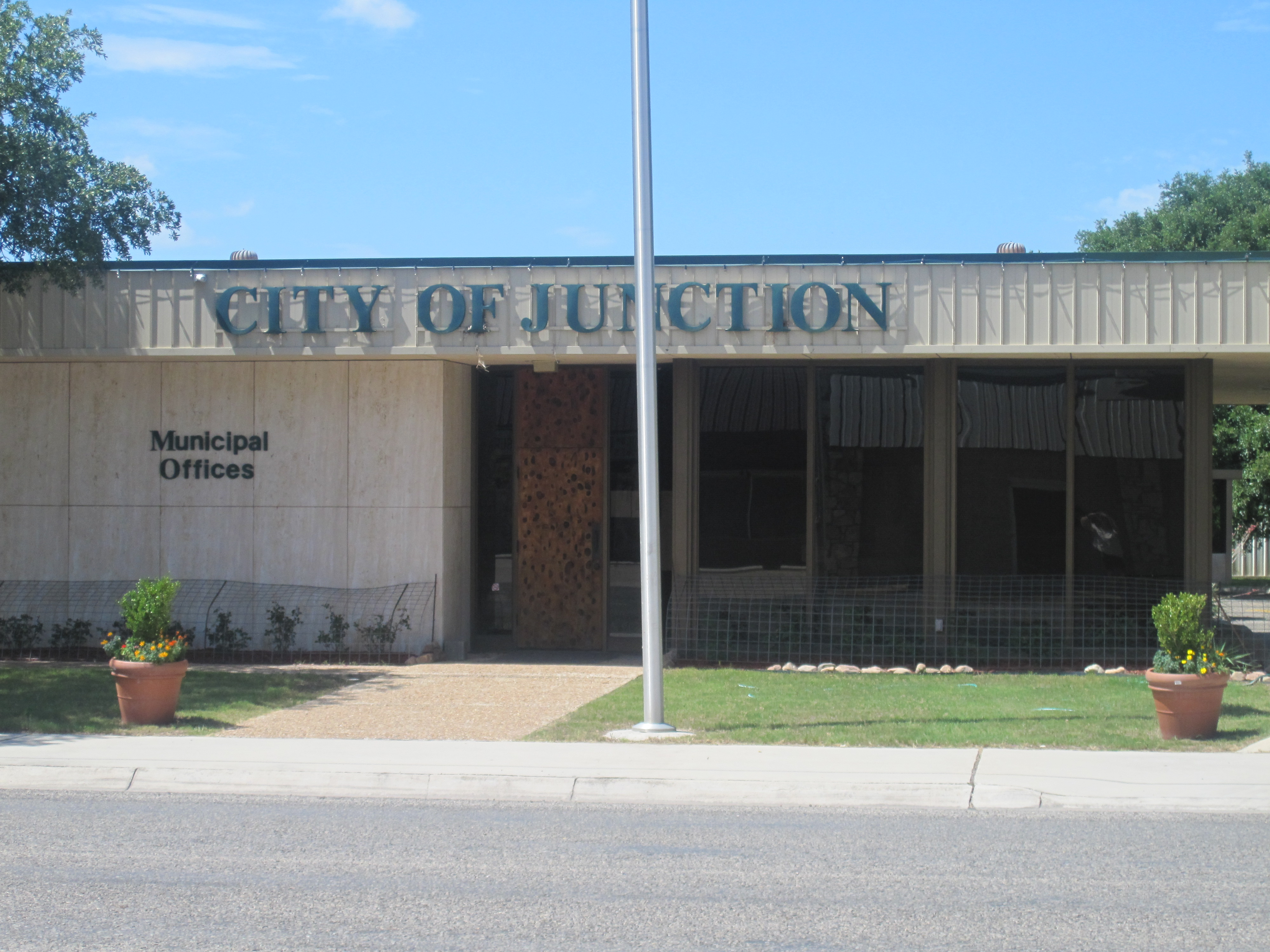
- Junction City Hall
- Nicknames: Land of Living Waters, Front Porch of the West

- Location within Texas Location within the United States
- Coordinates: 30°29′43″N 99°46′17″W
- Country: United States
- State: Texas
- County: Kimble

Area
  - Total: 2.30 sq mi (5.96 km^{2})
  - Land: 2.29 sq mi (5.94 km^{2})
  - Water: 0.0077 sq mi (0.02 km^{2})
- Elevation: 1,709 ft (521 m)

Population (2020)
  - Total: 2,451
  - Density: 1,070/sq mi (413/km^{2})
- Time zone: UTC-6 (Central (CST))
  - Summer (DST): UTC-5 (CDT)
- ZIP code: 76849
- Area code: 325
- FIPS code: 48-38248
- GNIS feature ID: 2410156
- Website: cityofjunction.com

Junction is a city in and the county seat of Kimble County, Texas, United States. Its population was 2,451 at the 2020 census.

== History ==
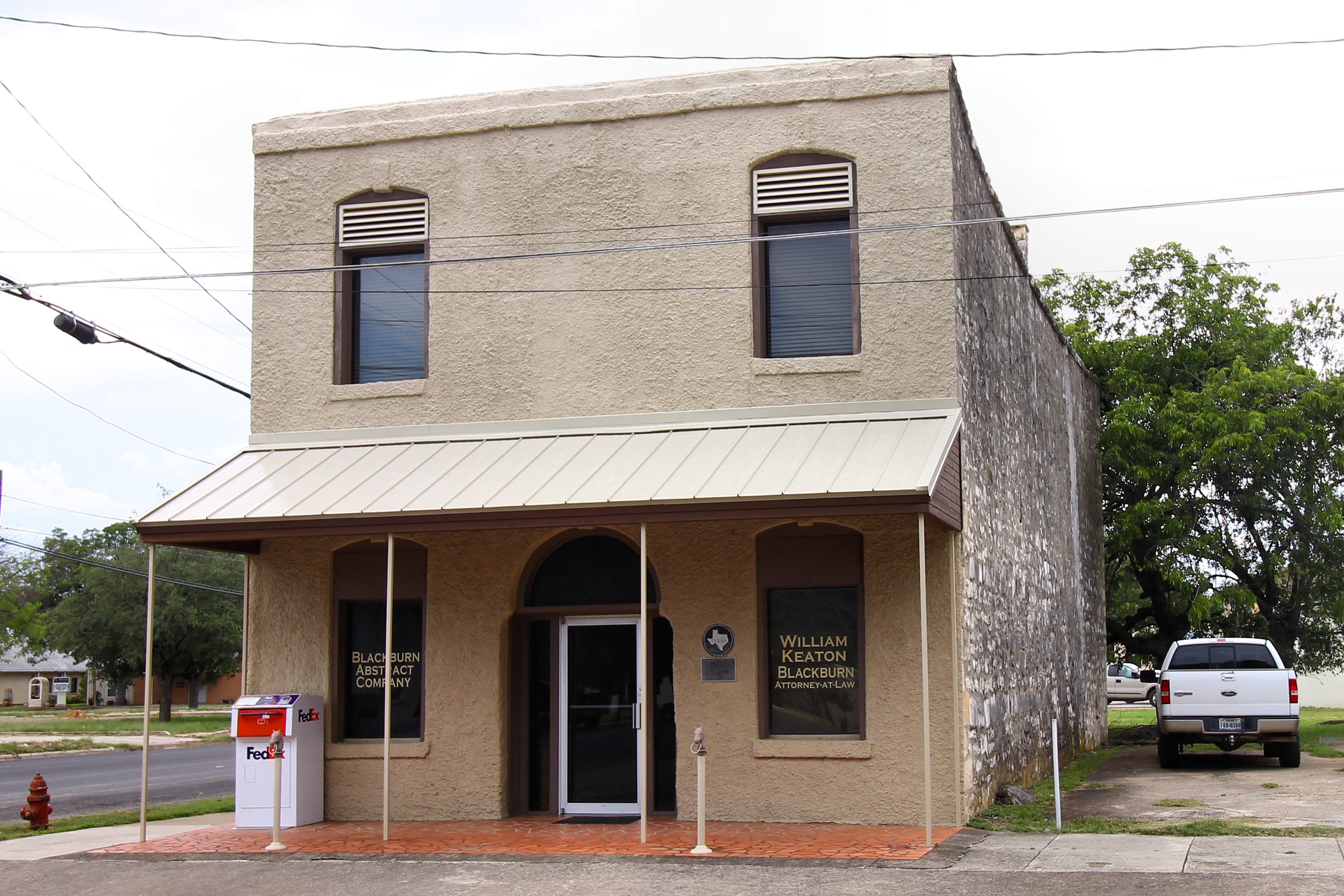
A former general store, built in 1879, still stands on the square in Junction.

The community was founded in 1876 after the organization of Kimble County earlier that year. The original town site was named "Denman" after Marcellus Denman, who had surveyed and platted the new community. The name was quickly changed to "Junction City". In late 1876, Junction City won the designation of county seat from the unsuccessful and flood-prone settlement of Kimbleville. By 1879, a drugstore, livery stable, sawmill, and a few general stores were active in the community. Around 300 people were living in Junction City in 1882. The West Texas, Kimble County's first newspaper, began publishing in 1882. The county courthouse and its records were lost to a fire in 1884. A second, two-story brick and stone courthouse was partially destroyed in an 1888 fire, but was repaired and remained in use until 1929, when the present courthouse was constructed. In 1894, Junction City became known simply as "Junction". Infrastructure improvements marked the decade of the 1890s. Businessman Ernest Holekamp provided the city's first waterworks with a canal dug from the South Llano to Junction in 1895. A dam was built in 1896 on the South Llano River to provide power and water to the city and irrigation to surrounding lands.

The population stood at 536 in 1900. Four Mile Dam, a more permanent and extensive dam, was completed in 1904. Junction continued to grow rapidly, with around 800 residents living in the community in 1910. That figure had grown to 1,250 by 1920. By the late 1920s, citizens felt the need for the benefits of a municipal government. On August 27, 1927, H.O. Denman and 152 others presented an incorporation petition to Kimble County Judge J.B. Randolph. In the election, 390 votes were cast: 274 (70%) "For Incorporation" and 116 (30%) "Against Incorporation". A city officers' election took place on October 13, 1927, with Ernest Holekamp elected as Junction's first mayor.

During the mid-1920s, highway connections from Junction to Menard and San Angelo were made available. A sewer system was built in 1929. In the 1930 census, the city recorded 1,415 residents. Junction was the chief shipping and commercial center of Kimble County, as well as a tourist resort and hunting center. A new municipal building and fire station were opened in 1939 and 1940, respectively. In the mid-1940s, the cedar-oil business enhanced the economy, but the city's growth slowed. Throughout the latter half of the 20th century and into the 21st, Junction's population continued to hover around 2,600.

== Geography ==
Junction is located approximately 115 miles (185 km) northwest of San Antonio and 140 miles (230 km) west of Austin in central Kimble County. It lies near the western end of the Texas Hill Country, which grades into the southernmost parts of the West Texas Rolling Plains, to the west of Junction.

Highways include:

- Interstate 10
- U.S. Route 83
- U.S. Route 377

According to the United States Census Bureau, Junction has a total area of 2.3 sq mi (6.0 km^{2}), of which 0.01 square miles (0.02 km^{2}), or 0.26%, is covered by water. The city is named for its location at the confluence of the North and South Llano Rivers.

=== Climate ===
The climate in this area is characterized by hot, humid summers and generally mild to cool winters. According to the Köppen climate classification, Junction has a humid subtropical climate, Cfa on climate maps.

Climate data for Junction, Texas, 1991–2020 normals, extremes 1897–present
Month	Jan	Feb	Mar	Apr	May	Jun	Jul	Aug	Sep	Oct	Nov	Dec	Year
Record high °F (°C)	90 (32)	98 (37)	100 (38)	104 (40)	114 (46)	111 (44)	109 (43)	112 (44)	108 (42)	104 (40)	94 (34)	91 (33)	114 (46)
Mean maximum °F (°C)	80.0 (26.7)	82.7 (28.2)	88.5 (31.4)	93.6 (34.2)	98.9 (37.2)	100.9 (38.3)	102.0 (38.9)	102.8 (39.3)	98.0 (36.7)	93.0 (33.9)	84.4 (29.1)	79.8 (26.6)	104.4 (40.2)
Mean daily maximum °F (°C)	62.0 (16.7)	66.0 (18.9)	73.2 (22.9)	81.0 (27.2)	86.7 (30.4)	92.8 (33.8)	95.6 (35.3)	95.8 (35.4)	89.0 (31.7)	81.0 (27.2)	69.8 (21.0)	62.5 (16.9)	79.6 (26.5)
Daily mean °F (°C)	45.8 (7.7)	49.9 (9.9)	57.5 (14.2)	65.1 (18.4)	73.1 (22.8)	79.9 (26.6)	81.9 (27.7)	81.6 (27.6)	74.8 (23.8)	65.2 (18.4)	54.4 (12.4)	46.5 (8.1)	64.6 (18.1)
Mean daily minimum °F (°C)	29.5 (−1.4)	33.8 (1.0)	41.8 (5.4)	49.2 (9.6)	59.5 (15.3)	66.9 (19.4)	68.3 (20.2)	67.5 (19.7)	60.5 (15.8)	49.5 (9.7)	38.9 (3.8)	30.4 (−0.9)	49.7 (9.8)
Mean minimum °F (°C)	14.4 (−9.8)	17.2 (−8.2)	21.5 (−5.8)	29.5 (−1.4)	41.6 (5.3)	56.1 (13.4)	61.1 (16.2)	58.9 (14.9)	45.8 (7.7)	30.6 (−0.8)	20.7 (−6.3)	15.4 (−9.2)	11.5 (−11.4)
Record low °F (°C)	−4 (−20)	−5 (−21)	5 (−15)	21 (−6)	29 (−2)	38 (3)	49 (9)	44 (7)	32 (0)	21 (−6)	9 (−13)	−11 (−24)	−11 (−24)
Average precipitation inches (mm)	0.90 (23)	1.28 (33)	2.04 (52)	1.96 (50)	2.73 (69)	2.56 (65)	1.52 (39)	1.89 (48)	2.73 (69)	2.87 (73)	1.35 (34)	1.19 (30)	23.02 (585)
Average snowfall inches (cm)	0.1 (0.25)	0.0 (0.0)	0.0 (0.0)	0.0 (0.0)	0.0 (0.0)	0.0 (0.0)	0.0 (0.0)	0.0 (0.0)	0.0 (0.0)	0.0 (0.0)	0.2 (0.51)	0.1 (0.25)	0.4 (1.01)
Average precipitation days (≥ 0.01 in)	3.5	3.9	4.8	3.6	4.8	3.9	4.1	4.4	4.6	4.1	3.9	4.0	49.6
Average snowy days (≥ 0.1 in)	0.1	0.0	0.0	0.0	0.0	0.0	0.0	0.0	0.0	0.0	0.2	0.0	0.3
Source 1: NOAA
Source 2: National Weather Service

Climate data for Kimble County Airport, Texas, 1991–2020 normals, extremes 1948–present
Month	Jan	Feb	Mar	Apr	May	Jun	Jul	Aug	Sep	Oct	Nov	Dec	Year
Record high °F (°C)	89 (32)	96 (36)	98 (37)	104 (40)	114 (46)	111 (44)	109 (43)	110 (43)	107 (42)	104 (40)	94 (34)	91 (33)	114 (46)
Mean maximum °F (°C)	81.1 (27.3)	83.7 (28.7)	88.7 (31.5)	94.4 (34.7)	99.3 (37.4)	101.2 (38.4)	102.8 (39.3)	103.1 (39.5)	98.4 (36.9)	92.8 (33.8)	84.0 (28.9)	80.9 (27.2)	104.8 (40.4)
Mean daily maximum °F (°C)	61.9 (16.6)	66.2 (19.0)	73.1 (22.8)	80.9 (27.2)	87.0 (30.6)	92.7 (33.7)	95.3 (35.2)	95.6 (35.3)	88.9 (31.6)	80.8 (27.1)	69.8 (21.0)	62.9 (17.2)	79.6 (26.4)
Daily mean °F (°C)	47.8 (8.8)	52.3 (11.3)	59.4 (15.2)	66.9 (19.4)	74.8 (23.8)	81.1 (27.3)	83.5 (28.6)	83.2 (28.4)	76.6 (24.8)	67.2 (19.6)	56.2 (13.4)	48.6 (9.2)	66.5 (19.2)
Mean daily minimum °F (°C)	33.7 (0.9)	38.4 (3.6)	45.6 (7.6)	53.0 (11.7)	62.6 (17.0)	69.5 (20.8)	71.6 (22.0)	70.8 (21.6)	64.3 (17.9)	53.6 (12.0)	42.5 (5.8)	34.3 (1.3)	53.3 (11.9)
Mean minimum °F (°C)	18.1 (−7.7)	20.7 (−6.3)	24.7 (−4.1)	33.1 (0.6)	45.4 (7.4)	59.6 (15.3)	64.8 (18.2)	63.0 (17.2)	50.8 (10.4)	34.7 (1.5)	24.5 (−4.2)	19.3 (−7.1)	15.4 (−9.2)
Record low °F (°C)	−3 (−19)	−7 (−22)	11 (−12)	25 (−4)	34 (1)	45 (7)	53 (12)	50 (10)	39 (4)	26 (−3)	11 (−12)	7 (−14)	−7 (−22)
Average precipitation inches (mm)	0.89 (23)	1.12 (28)	2.02 (51)	1.82 (46)	3.16 (80)	2.83 (72)	1.48 (38)	2.03 (52)	2.41 (61)	2.15 (55)	1.52 (39)	1.03 (26)	22.46 (571)
Average precipitation days (≥ 0.01 in)	4.3	4.8	5.6	5.2	7.0	5.5	5.6	5.8	6.0	6.3	5.7	4.9	66.7
Source 1: NOAA
Source 2: National Weather Service

== Demographics ==
Historical population
Census	Pop.	Note	%±
1890	449		—
1930	1,415		—
1940	2,086		47.4%
1950	2,471		18.5%
1960	2,441		−1.2%
1970	2,654		8.7%
1980	2,593		−2.3%
1990	2,654		2.4%
2000	2,618		−1.4%
2010	2,574		−1.7%
2020	2,451		−4.8%
U.S. Decennial Census

=== 2020 census ===
As of the 2020 census, Junction had a population of 2,451. The median age was 42.4 years, 22.3% of residents were under the age of 18, and 21.9% of residents were 65 years of age or older. For every 100 females there were 93.8 males, and for every 100 females age 18 and over there were 90.5 males.

Racial composition as of the 2020 census
Race	Number	Percent
White	1,878	76.6%
Black or African American	5	0.2%
American Indian and Alaska Native	22	0.9%
Asian	33	1.3%
Native Hawaiian and Other Pacific Islander	1	0.0%
Some other race	274	11.2%
Two or more races	238	9.7%
Hispanic or Latino (of any race)	785	32.0%

There were 1,048 households in Junction, of which 29.3% had children under the age of 18 living in them. Of all households, 41.2% were married-couple households, 20.5% were households with a male householder and no spouse or partner present, and 32.0% were households with a female householder and no spouse or partner present. About 32.7% of all households were made up of individuals and 16.4% had someone living alone who was 65 years of age or older.

There were 1,212 housing units, of which 13.5% were vacant. The homeowner vacancy rate was 3.1% and the rental vacancy rate was 7.2%.

0.0% of residents lived in urban areas, while 100.0% lived in rural areas.

=== 2000 census ===
As of the census of 2000, 2,618 people, 1,028 households, and 699 families resided in the city. The population density was 1,145.0 inhabitants per square mile (442.1/km^{2}). The 1,222 housing units averaged 534.5 per square mile (206.0/km^{2}). The racial makeup of the city was 86.13% White, 0.04% African American, 0.38% Native American, 0.69% Asian, 11.12% from other races, and 1.64% from two or more races. Hispanics or Latinos of any race were 28.99% of the population.

Of the 1,028 households, 35.4% had children under the age of 18 living with them, 52.3% were married couples living together, 12.1% had a female householder with no husband present, and 32.0% were not families. About 29.6% of all households were made up of individuals, and 16.9% had someone living alone who was 65 years of age or older. The average household size was 2.50 and the average family size was 3.11.

In the city, the population was distributed as 28.2% under the age of 18, 7.3% from 18 to 24, 24.4% from 25 to 44, 22.0% from 45 to 64, and 18.1% who were 65 years of age or older. The median age was 38 years. For every 100 females, there were 85.9 males. For every 100 females age 18 and over, there were 82.4 males.

The median income for a household in the city was $25,833, and for a family was $30,865. Males had a median income of $24,096 versus $18,750 for females. The per capita income for the city was $14,971. About 16.4% of families and 21.7% of the population were below the poverty line, including 30.9% of those under age 18 and 16.8% of those age 65 or over.

== Arts and culture ==
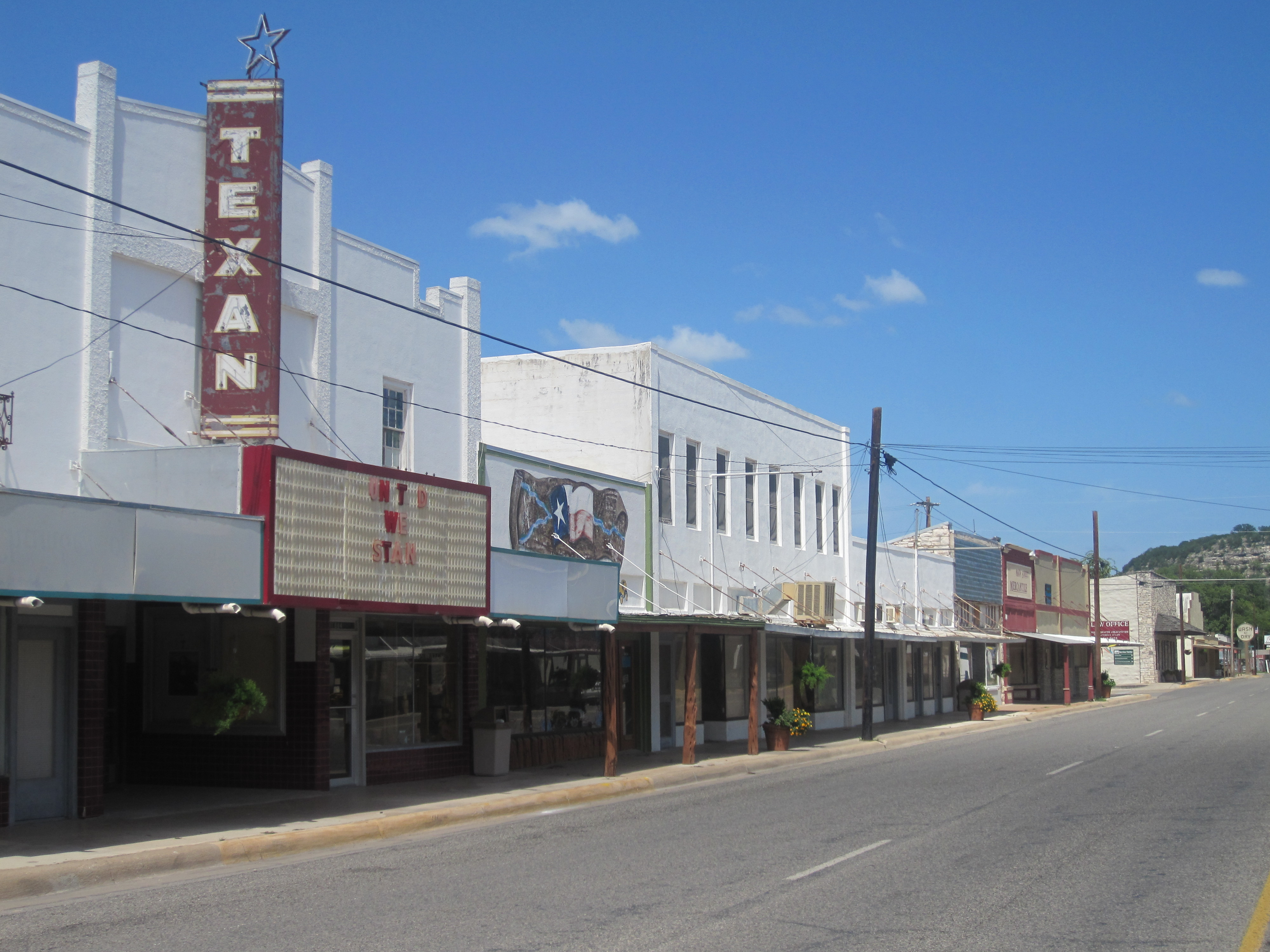
A view of downtown Junction, with the defunct Texan Theater at the left

Major celebrations in Junction include the Billie Sale and Parade held in August, and the annual Kimble Kow Kick, which takes place in September.

The Kimble County Historical Museum contains documents, tools, and other relics from the days of early settlers and military artifacts. The O.C. Fisher Museum, housed in the Kimble County Library, contains an exact duplicate of the Washington, DC, office of the long-time congressman who represented the Junction area.

== Parks and recreation ==
Junction is home to several parks, including the 2,600-acre (11 km^{2}) South Llano River State Park. The city also has eight swimming pools, golf and tennis courts, and abundant hotel/motel options due mainly to its location along the heavily traveled Interstate 10 corridor. The Fort McKavett State Historic Site is also located near Junction.

== Government ==
The city of Junction is a "Type A" General Law municipality under Texas law. The local government is headed by an elected mayor and five-member city council.

The Junction Economic Development Corporation, Tourism Board, and Chamber of Commerce are given the task of attracting jobs and visitors to Junction while supporting local business establishments.

== Education ==
Public education in the city of Junction is provided by the Junction Independent School District. The district supports an elementary, middle, and high school housed on a single campus at 1700 College Street.

Junction is home to the Texas Tech University Center at Junction, a satellite school of Texas Tech University in Lubbock. The center is situated on a 410-acre (1.7 km^{2}) campus, and offers a broad spectrum of programs in both the undergraduate and graduate disciplines.

All of Kimble County is in the service area of Howard County Junior College District.

== Infrastructure ==
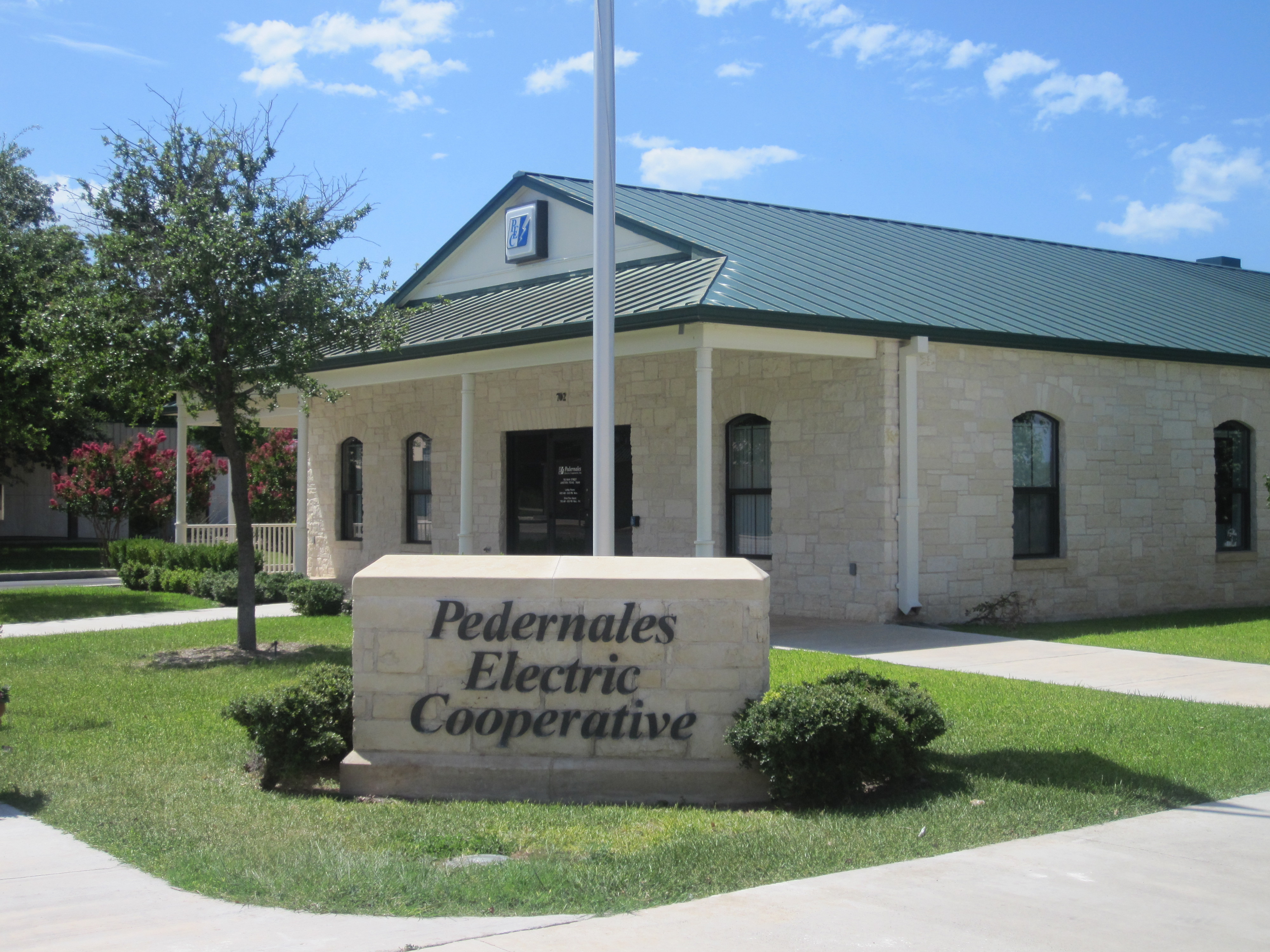
The Pedernales Electric Cooperative office in Junction

Notable highways serving the city include Interstate 10, U.S. Route 83, and U.S. Route 377.

Kimble County Airport consists of a 5,000-foot (1,500 m) paved runway. Commercial service is available to and from Mathis Field in San Angelo.

Electric power for the city of Junction is provided by AEP/West Texas Utilities, while member-owned Pedernales Electric distributes power to rural Kimble County.

A four-member police force and county sheriff officers serve the community. The 30-member volunteer fire department, as well as the Kimble County Ranch Fire Association, has firefighting personnel and equipment. Ambulance and rescue services are also provided.

== Notable people ==
- Les Cox, former Major League Baseball player
- Clinton Manges, South Texas businessman
- Andrew Murr current Republican member of the Texas House of Representatives
- Coke Stevenson, governor of Texas from 1941 to 1947, was a native of Junction.
