= James Young =

James Young may refer to:

== Business ==
- James R. Young (UP) (1952–2014), president, CEO and chairman of Union Pacific Railroad
- James R. Young (North Carolina politician) (1853–1937), Insurance Commissioner of North Carolina
- James Webb Young (1886–1973), American advertising executive

== Medicine and science ==
- James Young (physician) (1929–2008), American White House physician
- James Young (chemist) (1811–1883), Scottish chemist; distilled paraffin from coal
- James Whitney Young (born 1941), American astronomer
- James Edward Young (born 1926), American physicist

== Politics ==
- James Young (Canadian politician) (1835–1913), member of the Canadian House of Commons
- James Young (Texas politician) (1866–1942), U.S. Representative from Texas
- James Young (mayor) (born 1955), first African American to be elected mayor of Philadelphia, Mississippi, 2009
- James Young (New Brunswick politician) (1841–1907), merchant and political figure New Brunswick, Canada
- James Young (Upper Canada politician) (1777–1831), political figure in Upper Canada
- James Young (trade unionist) (1887–1975), Scottish politician and trade unionist
- James Addison Young (1815–1875), American politician from Iowa
- Alexander Young (New Zealand politician) (James Alexander Young, 1875–1956), New Zealand politician
- James H. Young (1860–1921), African-American North Carolina politician
- James Henry Young (1834–1908), colonial Australian businessman and politician
- James Young (Missouri politician) (1800–1878), lieutenant governor of Missouri who also served the Tennessee House of Representatives
- James R. Young (Pennsylvania politician) (1847–1924), U.S. Representative from Pennsylvania
- James M. Young (politician), American state legislator from Mississippi

== Sports ==
- James Young (American football) (born 1950), former professional American football defensive end
- James Young (basketball) (born 1995), American basketball player
- James Young (cricketer) (1913–1994), South African cricketer
- James Young (footballer, born 1882) (1882–1922), Scottish footballer, played for Celtic F.C. and Scotland
- James Young (footballer, born 1891) (1891–?), Scottish footballer
- James Young (hurler), hurling player from County Laois, Ireland
- James Young (sport shooter), Scottish sport shooter
- Jamie Young (born 1985), Anglo-Australian soccer goalkeeper

== Arts ==
- James Young (American musician) (born 1949), guitarist for the band Styx
- James Young (British musician) (born 1952), author and musical collaborator with Nico
- James Young (comedian) (1918–1974), Northern Irish comedian
  - James Young (album), a comedy album by James Young
- James Young (director) (1872–1948), American film director and actor
- James Hardy Vaux (1782–?), wrote the first Australian dictionary and used James Young as an alias

== Judiciary and academia ==
- James Scott Young (1848–1914), United States federal judge
- James Sterling Young (1927–2013), American historian and professor
- James Drummond Young, Lord Drummond Young (born 1950), judge of the Supreme Courts of Scotland
- James Fred Young, president of Elon University

== Military ==
- James Young (Royal Navy officer, born 1717) (1717–1789), Royal Navy officer
- James Young (Royal Navy officer, born 1762) (1762–1833), Royal Navy officer
- James M. Young (1843–1913), American soldier and Medal of Honor recipient
- James Young (British Army officer) (1858–1926), British general

== Others ==
- James Jubilee Young (1887–1962), Baptist minister
- James Harvey Young (1915–2006), social historian
- James Young (Arizona pioneer) (1844–1935), African-American boxer and Arizona pioneer

== See also ==
- James Young (coachbuilder), a coachbuilder for carriages or automobiles
- Jim Young (disambiguation)
- Jimmy Young (disambiguation)
- James Yonge (disambiguation)
- Jaymes Young (born 1991), American singer songwriter
