= Joseph Graves Olney =

Joseph Graves Olney (October 9, 1849 – December 3, 1884) was a rancher and cattleman in what is now Cochise County, Arizona. He arrived there around 1877 and set up a ranch in the San Simon Valley. Olney moved from Texas under circumstances which were notorious.

== Early life ==
Olney was born in Burleson County, Texas, to Joseph and Mary K. (Tanner) Olney on October 9, 1849. The family remained in Burleson until 1860, then they moved their ranch to Burnet County, Texas. In 1870, Olney married Agnes Jane Arnold and set up his own ranch in neighboring Llano County, Texas. About this time, Olney became friends with cowboy Johnny Ringo.

== Texas ==
In 1872, Olney served in John Alexander's Company O of the Texas Minutemen and participated in action against Indian raiders. His name appears on the court dockets for minor indictments such as exhibiting a Monte Bank and gaming. Over the next few years, Olney, along with John Ringo and the Baird brothers, became involved in the Mason County Hoo Doo War. As the situation escalated, Scott Cooley and John Ringo were arrested and incarcerated in the Lampasas County jail. It is believed that Olney and John Baird were the leaders of the group that sprung the two out. It is also believed that Olney hid Ringo in Llano.

== Gunfight ==
The morning of September 7, 1876, brought two riders, Deputy Sheriff S.B. Martin and Wilson Rowntree, to the Olney ranch. Not recognizing Olney, they asked where to ford the river. Olney directed them, and feeling suspicious, he followed the men. Martin and Rowntree then recognized Olney. A gun battle ensued in which Rowntree was wounded in the arm and Martin was killed. Olney attempted to exonerate himself by submitting his explanation to the local paper. He fled to New Mexico where he began using the alias Joe Hill. His name appeared on Governor Lew Wallace's list of outlaws. He was a wanted man listed as "Joseph Hill (alias Olney) killing a Deputy Shff. In Burnettown, Texas, sandy complected."

== Arizona ==
By the late 1870s, Olney had purchased a ranch in Old Mexico at Nuevo Casas Grandes near Corralitos and established another ranch in the San Simon Valley of Arizona. He drove cattle between the two ranches and up to San Carlos Reservation for sale to Indian agents. On one such drive, Olney, John Ringo, Ike Clanton, and Al Turner hurrahed the town of Safford, Arizona, a typical cowboy behavior. Olney and Ringo were present at the 1881 killing of Dick Lloyd. The two men and others were playing cards in the saloon when the drunk Dick Lloyd shot Ed Mann, mounted Olney's horse, and rode into the saloon. Lloyd was shot by Jack O'Neal. Olney and Ringo also rode together as part of the 1882 posse who pursued the Earps after the vendetta killings of Frank Stilwell and a Mexican, Florentino Cruz.

== Later life and death ==
After John Ringo's death in 1882, Joseph Olney's life finally began to settle down. He died on December 3, 1884, survived by his wife, Agnes Jane, and five children under the age of 15.

On December 13, 1884, The Arizona Silver Belt reported,

From The Willcox Stockman we learn that Joe Hill, a well-known cattle man, met with a fatal accident at Bowie, on Wednesday of last week. While driving cattle into a corral, riding at a full gallop, his horse stumbled and fell. Mr. Hill was thrown violently to the ground and received internal injuries from which he died within an hour.
