= Loyal Valley, Texas =

Unincorporated community in Texas, US

- unincorporated community
- Location in Texas
- Coordinates: 30°34′33″N 99°00′28″W
- Country: United States
- State: Texas
- County: Mason
- Elevation: 1,519 ft (463 m)

Population (as of 2000 per Handbook of Texas)
  - Total: 50
- Time zone: UTC-6 (Central (CST))
  - Summer (DST): UTC-5 (CDT)
- Area code: 325
- FIPS code: 48-44320
- GNIS feature ID: 1380113

Loyal Valley is an unincorporated farming and ranching community in the southeastern corner of Mason County, Texas, United States, that was established in 1858, and is 6 miles (9.7 km) north of Cherry Spring. The community is located near Cold Spring Creek, which runs east for 7.5 miles (12.1 km) to its mouth on Marschall Creek in Llano County, just east of Loyal Valley. The community is located on the old Pinta Trail. As of the year 2000, the population was 50.

== Settlers and community ==
Loyal Valley was settled in 1858 by German immigrants from nearby Fredericksburg, including Henry and Christian Keyser, John Kidd, and a Mr. Gertsdorff (most likely Von Gersdorff or Gersdorff, as it was spelled in that era). It was also a stagecoach stop on the route between San Antonio and the western forts.

The community received a post office in 1868, and Solomon Wright was the first postmaster.

John O. Meusebach moved to Loyal Valley after the New Braunfels tornado of September 12, 1869 destroyed his home there. According to Meusebach's granddaughter Irene Marschall King, he named the area for his personal loyalty to the Union that he had maintained during the American Civil War. He operated a general store and stage stop. Meusebach was appointed justice of the peace, notary public and served as the community's second postmaster in 1873. His daughter Lucy Meusebach Marschall was postmaster in January 1887, and his wife Agnes became postmaster in August 1887.

The 1847 Meusebach–Comanche Treaty was brokered with the Penateka Comanche Tribe, making area settlers safe from Penataka raids. However, Kiowa, Apache and other Comanche tribes still committed depredations against the settlers. During the 1870s, settlers from neighboring communities relocated to Loyal Valley for safety. Herman Lehmann, son of Augusta and Moritz Lehmann, became the most famous captive of the Apache depredations. He escaped the Apache, to be later rescued by the Comanche and adopted by chief Quanah Parker. Philip Buchmeyer (or Buchmeier) was the second husband of the widowed Augusta Lehmann, and stepfather to her sons Herman and Willie. The Buchmeyers ran a hotel and saloon, which later was owned by Charlie Metcalf. Philip Buchmeyer built a one-room stone structure school-church, which was still standing as of 1980.

== Mason County Hoo Doo War ==
In 1875, the Mason County Hoo Doo War erupted over cattle rustling and those who took the law into their own hands. Armed bands raided settlements spreading fear and unrest. John O. Meusebach was shot in the leg during a raid of his store. In the midst of the war, Loyal Valley home owner Tim Williamson was murdered by a dozen masked vigilantes who accused him of cattle theft. Williamson's adopted son Texas Ranger Scott Cooley sought revenge. Cooley and his desperadoes, who included Johnny Ringo, created a reign of terror over the area. It was during this episode that Ringo committed his first murder, that of James Cheyney.

== See also ==
- Cherry Springs Dance Hall
- 1999 Loyal Valley tornado
- National Register of Historic Places listings in Mason County, Texas
- Texas Germans
- Texas Hill Country
