= James Yonge =

James Yonge may refer to:

- James Yonge (translator), English translator
- James Yonge (surgeon) (1647–1721), naval surgeon and physician, FRS
- James Yonge (physician) (1794–1870), English physician

== See also ==
- James Young (disambiguation)
