= Plymouth Athenaeum =

Library and institution in Devon, England

Coordinates: 50.3688°N 4.1458°W

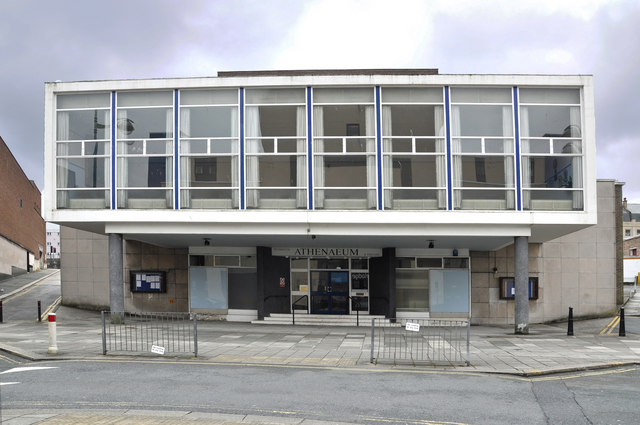
Plymouth Athenaeum

Plymouth Athenaeum, located in Plymouth, England, is a society dedicated to the promotion of learning in the fields of science, technology, literature and art.

The Athenaeum building, located at Derry's Cross in Plymouth City Centre, includes a 340-seat auditorium and a local interest library.

== History ==
Founded on 17 October 1812 as the Plymouth Institute, it was soon renamed the Plymouth Institution. The first meetings took place in Catherine Street and later Frankfort Street Art Gallery.

Architect and founding member of the Institution John Foulston, who had won a competition to design the Royal Hotel and Theatre group of buildings, designed the building that would become the permanent home of the organisation.

The foundation stone of the Athenaeum, which had a Greek Doric-style facade, was laid on 1 May 1818.

The Devon and Cornwall Natural History Society, formed in 1838, amalgamated with the Plymouth Institution in 1851. The Mechanics' Institute in Princes Street closed in 1899 and a merger with the Plymouth Institution took place.

Foulston's original Athenaeum was destroyed during The Blitz in 1941, resulting in the loss of the Institution's library, art and museum collections.

The Institution was renamed the Plymouth Athenaeum when it moved into its present building on 1 June 1961, which is located on almost the exact location of its pre-Blitz home. The building was designed by Walls and Pearn, local architects, who were also responsible for Plymouth's Pannier Market. It was built with a library, a lecture hall and a 340 seat theatre. The theatre was used as a studio by neighbour Westward Television Studios with a tunnel linking the two together. In 1963 John Lennon, Paul McCartney and George Harrison escaped fans by using the tunnel.

== Library ==
Before the Blitz, the Athenaeum library was home to more than 10,000 volumes on topics including science and natural history dating back to the early years of the society in the early 19th century.

The library was restored as part of the rebuilt Athenaeum in 1961 and is a full member of the Association of Independent Libraries.

== Lectures and talks ==
During its history, The Plymouth Athenaeum has played host to a number of high-profile lecturers, speakers and guests. These included broadcasters John Snagge and Edgar Lustgarten, Church of England envoy Terry Waite and artist Robert Lenkiewicz.

On a more local level, a regular contributor was local historian and academic Mr F S Blight (also a Plymouth headmaster). His presentations included Hail & Farewell to Devonport 1951, Popular Art in Plymouth 1953, Stoke & Morice Town 1951, and Captain Tobias Furneaux 1952. All these talks were released as printed booklets.

== Theatre ==
The rebuilt Athenaeum building included a theatre, being very popular with local dancing schools and Amateur Dramatic groups until its closure due to financial problems in 2009 .

Performers who took to the stage at the Athenaeum included actress Maggie Steed and poet Pam Ayres. In 1971, with the co-operation of the British Film Institute, a film theatre was created with the construction of a projection room on the roof. Present at the opening night were Malcolm McDowell, Bryan Forbes and Nanette Newman.

The theatre was relaunched in 2016 and opened in 2017. This was made possible through a collaboration with the local Barbican Theatre, a Social Enterprise Investment Fund grant and loan from Plymouth City Council. In 2019 it was announced that The Barbican Theatre and The Plymouth Athenaeum had come together to form the PL1 Partnership, led by directors from both organisations, working together to bring the venue into public use.

In 2021, the PL1 Partnership dissolved itself and as of 2026, the building stands empty again.

== The Beatles ==
On 13 November 1963, the English rock band The Beatles played at the ABC Cinema, next to the Athenaeum. The band were rushed in and out of the Athenaeum to avoid the crowds of screaming fans gathered outside the cinema. They returned to play the ABC Cinema on 29 October 1964, and were escorted through a tunnel which connected the Athenaeum with Westward Television, who had been filming them from the Lyneham Inn, on the outskirts of Plymouth. At the end of the concert, and following a short delay, the band were driven away from Westward's studios.

== Bicentenary ==
The Athenaeum celebrated its bicentenary in 2012 with an open week of activities and the publication of a book charting its 200-year history.

== Notable members ==
Notable members of the Plymouth Institution or Plymouth Athenaeum include:

- Sir Thomas Dyke Acland, 11th Baronet, Member of Parliament
- Charles Cardale Babington, botanist and archaeologist
- Charles Foster Barham, physician and antiquarian
- Charles Spence Bate, zoologist and dentist
- Charles William Bracken, entomologist
- William Buckland, theologian, geologist and palaeontologist
- Nicholas Toms Carrington, poet
- Derwent Coleridge, writer and educationalist
- Robert Porrett Collier, 1st Baron Monkswell, Solicitor-General and artist
- Charles Darwin, scientist
- Henry De la Beche, geologist and palaeontologist
- Isaac Foot, politician and solicitor
- John Foulston, architect
- Robert Were Fox the Younger, geologist, natural philosopher and inventor
- Edward Stanley Gibbons, chemist and early philatelist
- John Edward Gray, zoologist and the first philatelist
- Albert Günther, zoologist and taxonomist
- James Hayward, actor
- William Snow Harris, electrical engineer
- Jonathan Nash Hearder, electrical engineer
- John Stevens Henslow, botanist and geologist
- William Jackson Hooker, botanist
- Henry George Hurrell, naturalist
- John Jackson, engineer
- Robert Jameson, naturalist and mineralogist
- James Joseph Judge, journalist and social worker
- Rita Lang, musician
- William Elford Leach, zoologist and marine biologist
- John Lubbock, 1st Baron Avebury, Member of Parliament and scientist
- Sidney Gordon Monk, electrical engineer
- Sir William Luscombe Munday, solicitor and historian
- William Pengelly, geologist and archaeologist
- John Phillips, geologist
- Samuel Rowe, topographer and antiquary
- William Saunders, newspaper publisher and politician
- Emma Scott, headmistress and first woman President of the Institution, in 1917
- Adam Sedgwick, geologist
- Charles Hamilton Smith, soldier and naturalist
- John Thomas Towson, geographer and early photographer
- Walter Frank Raphael Weldon, zoologist and biometrician
- Richard Francis Weymouth, philologist and bible scholar
- George Wightwick, architect
- Dr Alison Wilson and Dr Douglas Wilson, marine scientists
- William Henry Kearley Wright, librarian
- James Yonge, physician
