= Jim Young (disambiguation) =

Jim Young (born 1943) is former American football and Canadian football player.

Jim Young may also refer to:

- James Whitney Young (born 1941), American astronomer
- Jim Young (dual player) (1915–1992), Irish hurler and Gaelic footballer for Glen Rovers and Cork
- Jim Young (St Finbarr's hurler), Irish hurler for St. Finbarr's and Cork
- Jim Young (footballer) (1921–1988), Australian rules footballer
- Jim Young (American football coach) (born 1935), American football coach
- Jim Young (boat builder) (1925–2020), New Zealand sailor, boat designer and builder

== See also ==
- Jimmy Young (disambiguation)
- James Young (disambiguation)
