= Alfred Fields =

Mississippi politician

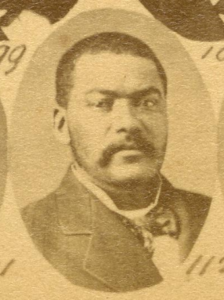

Personal details
- Born: c. 1846

Alfred Fields (born c. 1846) was a state legislator in Mississippi. He represented Panola County, Mississippi in the Mississippi House of Representatives in 1880.

He was born 1846 in Bourbon County, Kentucky.

James M. Young was accused of shooting him in 1884. He was sentenced to two years in the penitentiary for bribery in 1885.

== See also ==
- African American officeholders from the end of the Civil War until before 1900
