= Billy Claiborne =

American outlaw (1860–1882)

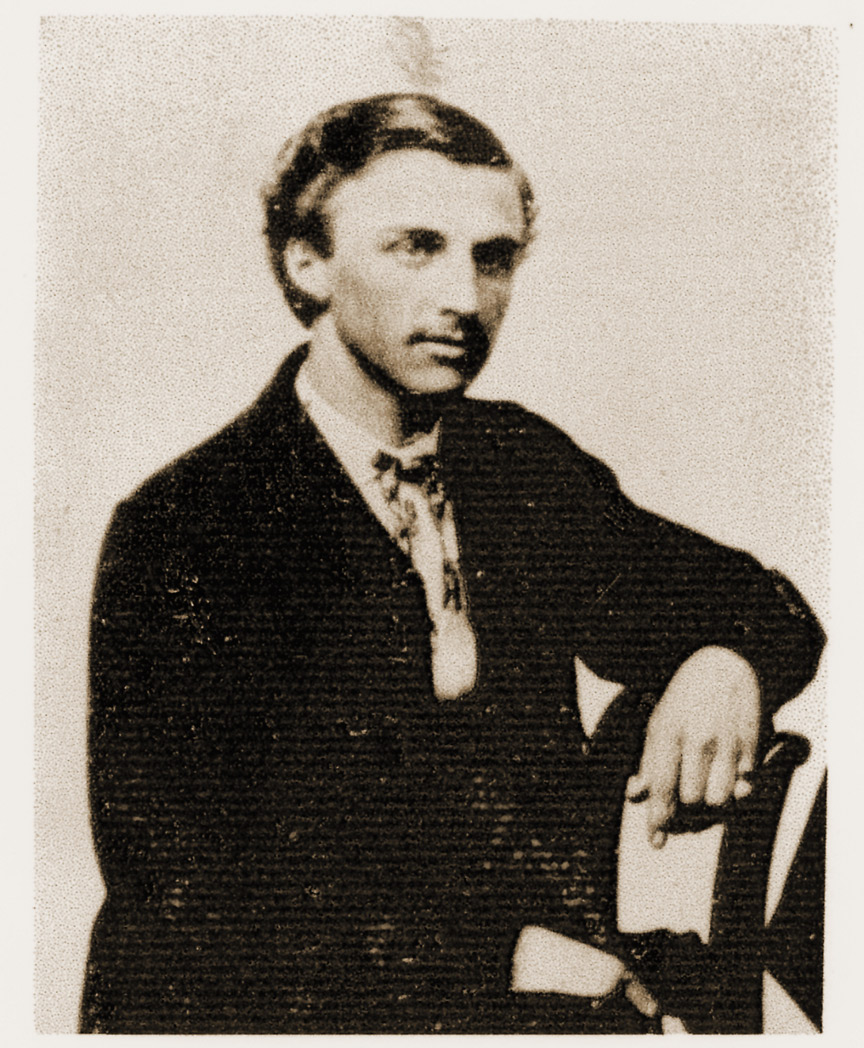
- A purported photo of Claiborne that has been widely published on the internet. There is no proof that it depicts him.
- Born: William Claiborne; October 21, 1860
- Died: November 14, 1882 (aged 22); Tombstone, Arizona Territory, U.S.
- Cause of death: Gunshot wound
- Occupations: Ranch hand, drover, miner, gunfighter
- Allegiance: Cochise County Cowboys

Billy Claiborne (October 21, 1860 – November 14, 1882) was an American outlaw, cowboy, drover, miner, and gunfighter in the American Old West. He killed James Hickey in a confrontation in a saloon, but it was ruled self-defense. He was present at the beginning of the Gunfight at the O.K. Corral, but was unarmed and ran from the shootout. Only a year later, while drunk, he confronted gunfighter "Buckskin" Frank Leslie and was killed.

== Early life ==
As a young man, William Claiborne worked as a cowhand and remuda rider for John Slaughter and helped him drive cattle from Texas to the Arizona Territory in 1879. In Tombstone, he worked on the amalgamator at mines in Charleston, and as a slag cart driver at the Neptune Mining Company smelter in Hereford, Arizona.

== Killing of James Hickey ==
On October 1, 1881, Claiborne got into an argument with James Hickey in the Queen's Saloon in Charleston. Hickey had been drinking for three days. Harry Queen, the saloon owner and eyewitness reported on the event:

I was present when James Hickey was killed. Hickey was standing close to the table where a game of cards was being plaid (sic) in my saloon. He turned to walk out at the same time this young fellow they called The Kid was coming into the saloon. When he saw Hickey he turned to walk out. Hickey said at that time he would like to see any Prick Eating Son of a Bitch stand in front of them. The Kid turned around and said don't follow me, you have been following me long enough and I won't stand it any longer. If you follow me any longer I will kill you. After The Kid told Hickey not to follow him any longer Hickey continued to advance. The Kid drew his pistol, raised it, and fires. Hickey turn (sic) partly around after the report of the pistol and fell on his face and left side.

Claiborne shot Hickey in the cheek below his left eye, killing him instantly. Over a month later, on November 26, the trial was convened, but only four jurors showed up. The next court day, three jurors did not show up. When all of the jurors finally showed up, they asked the judge if they could convict on second degree murder. When the judge said no, they said they could not agree on a verdict and the judge declared a mistrial. A second trial was set for May 11, 1882, but most of the defense attorneys did not appear. A new trial date was set on May 15 but not enough jurors could be found. Hickey was not well-liked and when a jury was finally convened, Billy was found not guilty and set free.

In 1881, after William "Billy the Kid" Bonney was killed, Claiborne demanded that others call him "Billy the Kid". He reportedly killed one to three men who refused. Claiborne was a heavy drinker and hothead. He became friends with Ike and Billy Clanton, and with Tom and Frank McLaury.

== Gunfight at the O.K. Corral ==
On the morning of October 26, 1881, Ike Clanton was carrying his rifle and revolver in violation of a city ordinance. At about 1:00 pm, Virgil and Morgan Earp surprised Ike on 4th Street and Virgil buffaloed him from behind. Disarming him, the Earps took Ike to appear before Judge Wallace. Wallace wasn't in the courthouse, and Wyatt waited with Clanton while Virgil went to find Judge Wallace.

Wyatt spotted Tom McLaury outside the courthouse and thought he was armed. Wyatt confronted McLaury, demanding to know, "Are you heeled or not?", but McLaury denied it. Wyatt later testified that he saw a revolver in plain sight on the right hip of Tom's pants. As an unpaid deputy town marshal, assisting his brother and Town Marshal Virgil Earp, Wyatt habitually carried a pistol in his waistband, as was the custom of that time. Witnesses reported that Wyatt drew his revolver from his coat pocket and pistol-whipped Tom McLaury with it twice, leaving him prostrate and bleeding on the street.

At around 1:30–2:00 pm, Ike's 19-year-old younger brother Billy Clanton and Tom's older brother Frank McLaury arrived in town. They stopped at the saloon in the Grand Hotel on Allen Street. Claiborne told them about their brothers' beatings at the hands of the Earp brothers within the previous two hours. The incidents had generated a lot of talk in town. Angrily, Frank said he would not drink, and he and Billy left the saloon immediately to seek Tom and Ike. By law, both Frank and Billy should have left their firearms at the Grand Hotel. Instead, they remained fully armed.

Frank and Billy found Ike and Tom. They went to Spangenberg's gun shop, where Frank and Billy purchased ammunition. Ike wanted to buy a gun, but seeing the bandage on Ike's head, the proprietor refused. The McLaurys left to collect some money due them for cattle they had sold. Claiborne and Billy Clanton went to get Clanton's horse. They met the others a few minutes later at the O.K. Corral. Witnesses overheard them threatening the Earps.

Virgil Earp was told by several citizens that the McLaurys and the Clantons had gathered on Fremont Street, were threatening the Earps, and were armed. He decided he had to act. Meanwhile, Cochise County Sheriff Johnny Behan, a friend to the Cowboys, had heard of the trouble and he immediately went looking for the Cowboys.

In Hafford's Saloon, Behan found City Marshal Virgil Earp, who asked Behan to help him disarm the Cowboys. Instead, Behan offered to talk to the Clantons and McLaurys on his own to see if they would give up their arms. Behan left and Virgil waited several minutes when local furniture dealer John Fonck told Virgil that the Cowboys were on Fremont St. Virgil said he did not want to interfere if they were on their way out of town, but if they were armed while in town he would have to arrest them. Fonck responded, "Why, they're all down on Fremont Street now."

At about 2:30 pm the Earps and Holliday found Frank and Tom McLaury and Ike and Billy Clanton gathered near the front of an empty lot off Fremont street, next to C.S. Fly's Boarding House and Photography Studio. Behan said he attempted to persuade Frank McLaury to give up his weapons, but Frank insisted that he would only give up his guns after City Marshal Virgil Earp and his brothers were disarmed.

The Earps and Holliday walked north on Fourth Street and then west, down the south side west of Fremont Street, looking for the Cowboys. They passed the rear entrance to the O.K. Corral and then Bauer's butcher shop.

Sheriff Behan saw the Earps and Holliday approaching. He left the Cowboys and went to the lawmen, though he looked nervously backward several times. Virgil testified later that Behan told them, "For God's sake, don't go down there or they will murder you!" Wyatt said Behan told him and Morgan, "I have disarmed them." Behan testified afterward that he'd only said he'd gone down to the Cowboys "for the purpose of disarming them," not that he'd actually disarmed them.

Wyatt testified afterward that he saw "Frank McLaury, Tom McLaury, and Billy Clanton standing in a row against the east side of the building on the opposite side of the vacant space west of Fly's photograph gallery. Ike Clanton and Billy Claiborne and a man I don't know [Wes Fuller] were standing in the vacant space about halfway between the photograph gallery and the next building west." Wes Fuller was towards the back of the lot.

When the shooting commenced—nobody could be certain who fired first—Ike Clanton ran towards Wyatt and pleaded that he was unarmed and did not want a fight. To this Wyatt said he responded, "Go to fighting or get away!" Clanton ran through the front door of Fly's boarding house and escaped. Billy Claiborne ran out the back of the lot.

== Later life ==
When the Rev. Endicott Peabody announced he would preach a sermon in Charleston in early February, 1882, against alcoholism, Claiborne wrote warning him to stay away from the subject. Peabody replied that he would preach on any subject he chose at any time and heard no more from the bullying Claiborne.

After running from the O.K. Corral shoot out, Claiborne's reputation fell. He testified at the O.K. Corral Spicer hearing, and then left Tombstone for several months. He went to Globe and got a job in the mines. He told a friend that he was "working double shifts to get enough money to go to Tombstone and kill Frank Leslie." Billy blamed Leslie for killing his friend Johnny Ringo. Bill returned to Tombstone on November 14, 1882.

== Death ==
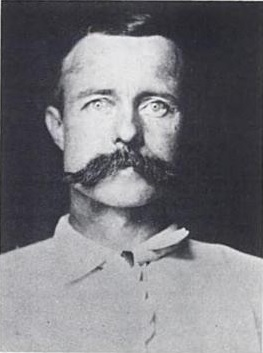
Frank Leslie killed Claiborne in what was ruled self-defense.

"Buckskin" Frank Leslie was tending bar at the Oriental Saloon on November 14, 1882, when Claiborne, who was very drunk, began using insulting and abusive language. Leslie asked Claiborne to leave, but Claiborne continued his foul and abusive speech. Leslie later testified,

I was talking with some friends in the Oriental Saloon when Claiborne pushed his way in among us and began using very insulting language. I took him to one side and said, "Billy, don't interfere, those people are friends among themselves and are not talking about politics at all, and don't want you about." He appeared quite put out and used rather bad and certainly very nasty language towards me. I told him there was no use of his fighting with me, that there was no occasion for it, and leaving him I joined my friends. He came back again and began using exceedingly abusive language, when I took him by the collar of his coat and led him away, telling him not to get mad, that it was for his own good, that if he acted in that manner he was liable to get in trouble. He pushed away from me, using very hard language, and as he started away from me, shook a finger at me and said, "That's all right, Leslie, I'll get even on you," and went out of the saloon.

Within a few minutes, two men told Leslie there was a man waiting outside to shoot him. When Leslie stepped outside, he saw "a foot of rifle barrel protruding from the end of the fruit stand." He told Claiborne "Don't shoot, I don't want you to kill me, nor do I want to have to shoot you." but Claiborne, still drunk, raised his rifle and fired the weapon, missing Leslie. Leslie returned fire and hit Claiborne in the chest. "I saw him double up and had my pistol cocked and aimed at him again ... I advanced upon him, but did not shoot, when he said, 'Don't shoot again, I am killed.' Claiborne was taken to a doctor by friends, where he died six hours after being shot. His last words were reportedly, "Frank Leslie killed Johnny Ringo, I saw him do it". He was buried in Tombstone's Boothill Cemetery.

Leslie was found to have acted in self-defense and was not charged.

The Cochise County, Arizona Coroners Report for Billy Claiborne is number 39 for the year 1882. The report reads:

"In the matter of the inquest held on the body of Wm Claiborne, deceased. Inquest held by H. M. Mailthews, Coroner. Proceedings: Nov 14 - inquest held. Nov 20 - filed. Cause of death, "gun shot wounds""

Other than listing his name as William, which was already a logical assumption, there is no information provided that shows his full name, date of birth, or place of birth in this report. (Arizona, County Coroner and Death Records, 1881–1971)

Billy Claiborne is buried on Boot Hill cemetery. This headstone is a simple wooden plank inscribed with the words: "Wm Claiborne. 1882. Shot by Frank Leslie". There is no evidence on his tombstone marker to provide an identity.

== Claim regarding his identity ==
A website chronicling the life of Nashville Franklin "Buckskin Frank" Leslie made the assertion that Billie Claiborne was William Floyd Claiborne, born 21 October 1860 in Yazoo County, Mississippi. However, this website is now defunct and provided no other sources for their information. Genealogists for the Claiborne-Cliburn DNA Project dispute this claim.

William Floyd Claiborne married Hattie Barnton on 27 January 1887 in Yazoo County, Mississippi. He later appeared on the 1910 Census as a widower with his children. Since William Floyd Claiborne of Yazoo County, Mississippi, was still alive and still living in Yazoo five years after Billy Claiborne died, it is not possible for Billy to be William Floyd.

== On film ==
In his unheroic role, Claiborne was nearly omitted from dramatizations of the gunfight at the OK Corral. Exceptions are: Tombstone, where he was portrayed by Wyatt Earp III. Mr. Earp was a great-nephew of the original Wyatt Earp;, Tombstone Rashomon, and the Star Trek episode Spectre of the Gun, in which Pavel Chekov and crew stood in for members of the Clanton Gang during a loose depiction of the gunfight at the OK Corral, in a fatalistic simulation contrived by aliens as an elaborate scheme to condemn the Star Trek crew to death.
