= 1999 Loyal Valley tornado =

1999 F4 tornado in Texas

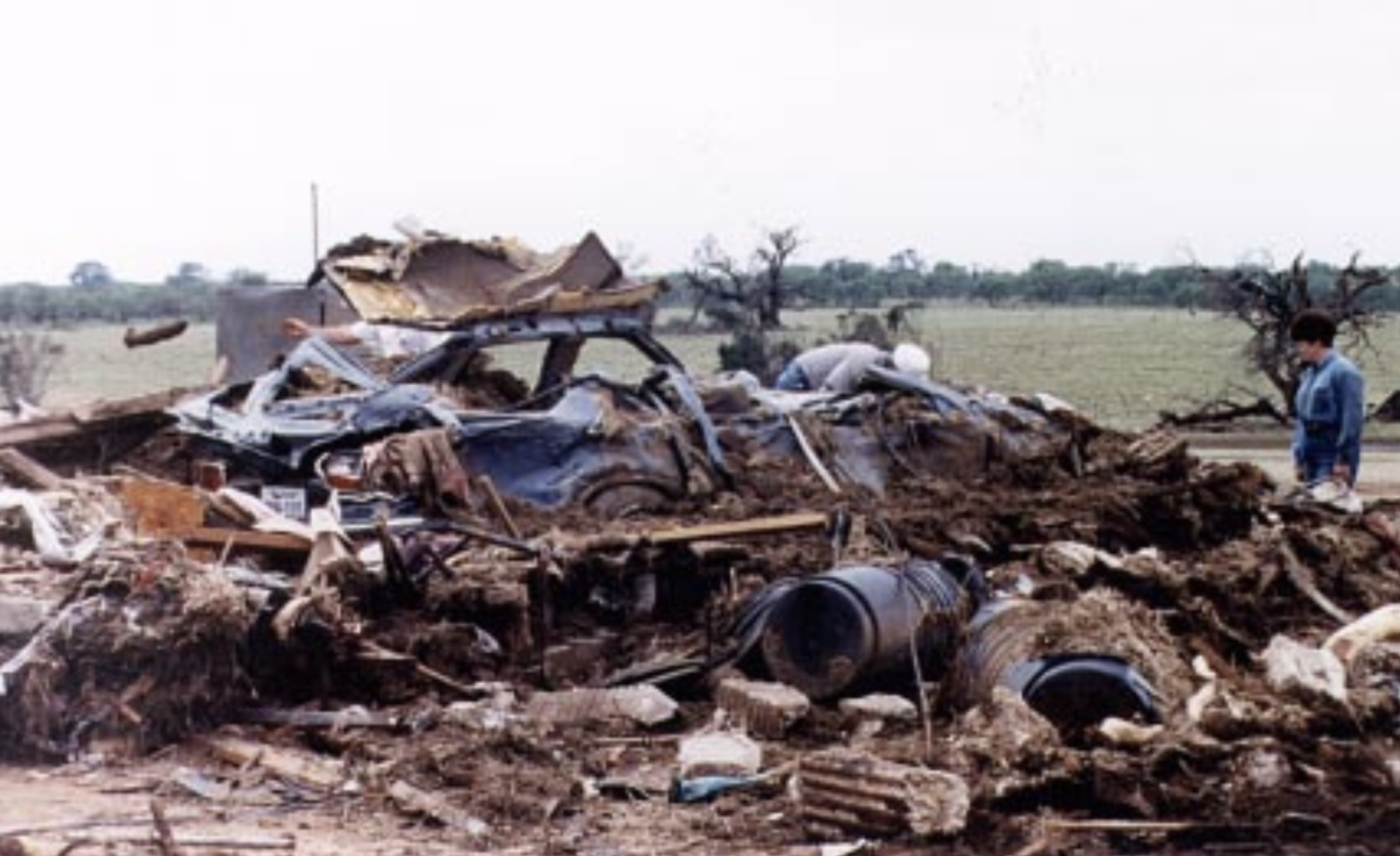
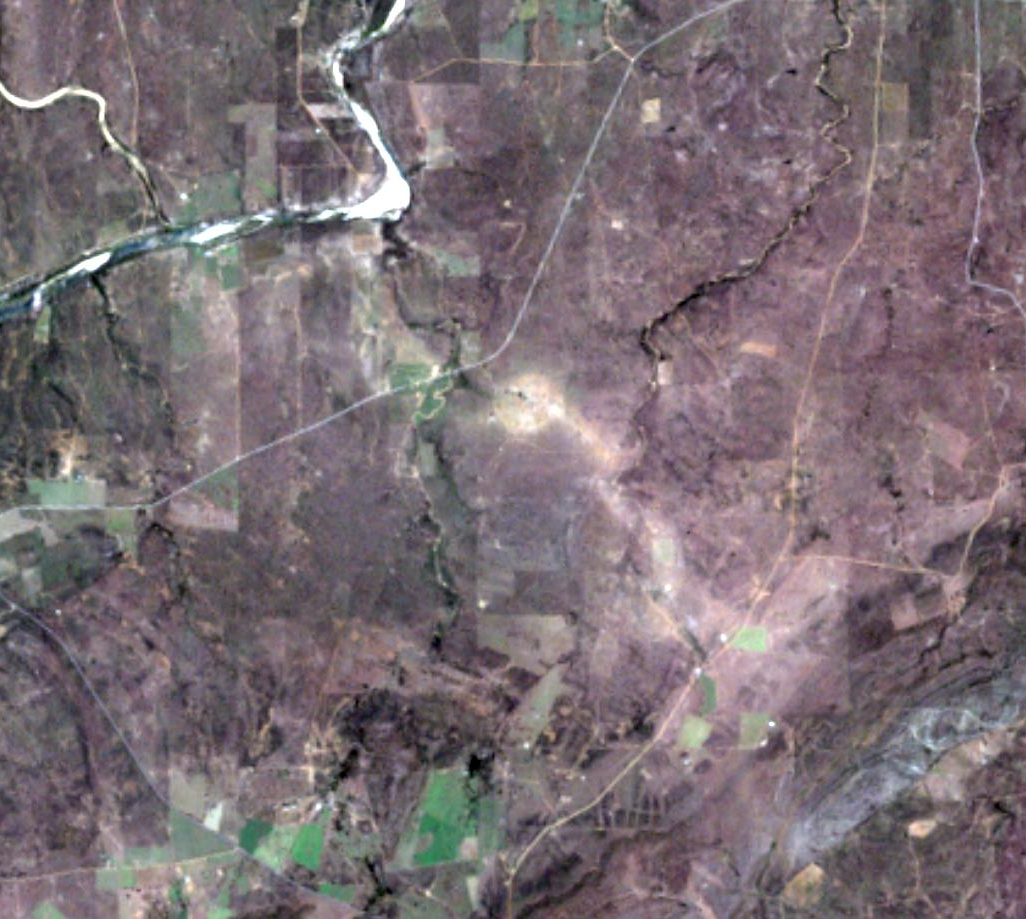
- Clockwise from top: The tornado as it crossed the Llano River; A scar seen from satellite 2 months after the tornado; A house that was obliterated by the tornado. The car shown is where six people took shelter during the tornado.

Meteorological history
- Formed: May 11, 1999, 5:05 p.m. CDT (UTC−05:00)
- Dissipated: May 11, 1999, 5:45 p.m. CDT (UTC−05:00)
- Duration: 40 minutes

F4 tornado
- on the Fujita scale
- Highest winds: 207 to 260 mph (333 to 418 km/h)

Overall effects
- Fatalities: 1
- Injuries: 6
- Damage: $1 million (1999 USD)
- Areas affected: Mason County, Texas near Loyal Valley
- Part of the tornado outbreaks of 1999

During the afternoon hours of May 11, 1999, a violent and destructive multiple-vortex tornado struck areas around the community of Loyal Valley in Texas, killing one person. The tornado, rated a high-end F4 on the Fujita scale, caused extreme damage along its relatively short path. Meteorologist Bill Hecke of KNCT-FM stated the tornado's intensity rivaled the Bridge Creek–Moore F5 tornado, which had struck Oklahoma a week prior, and the 1997 Jarrell F5 tornado.

== Tornado summary ==
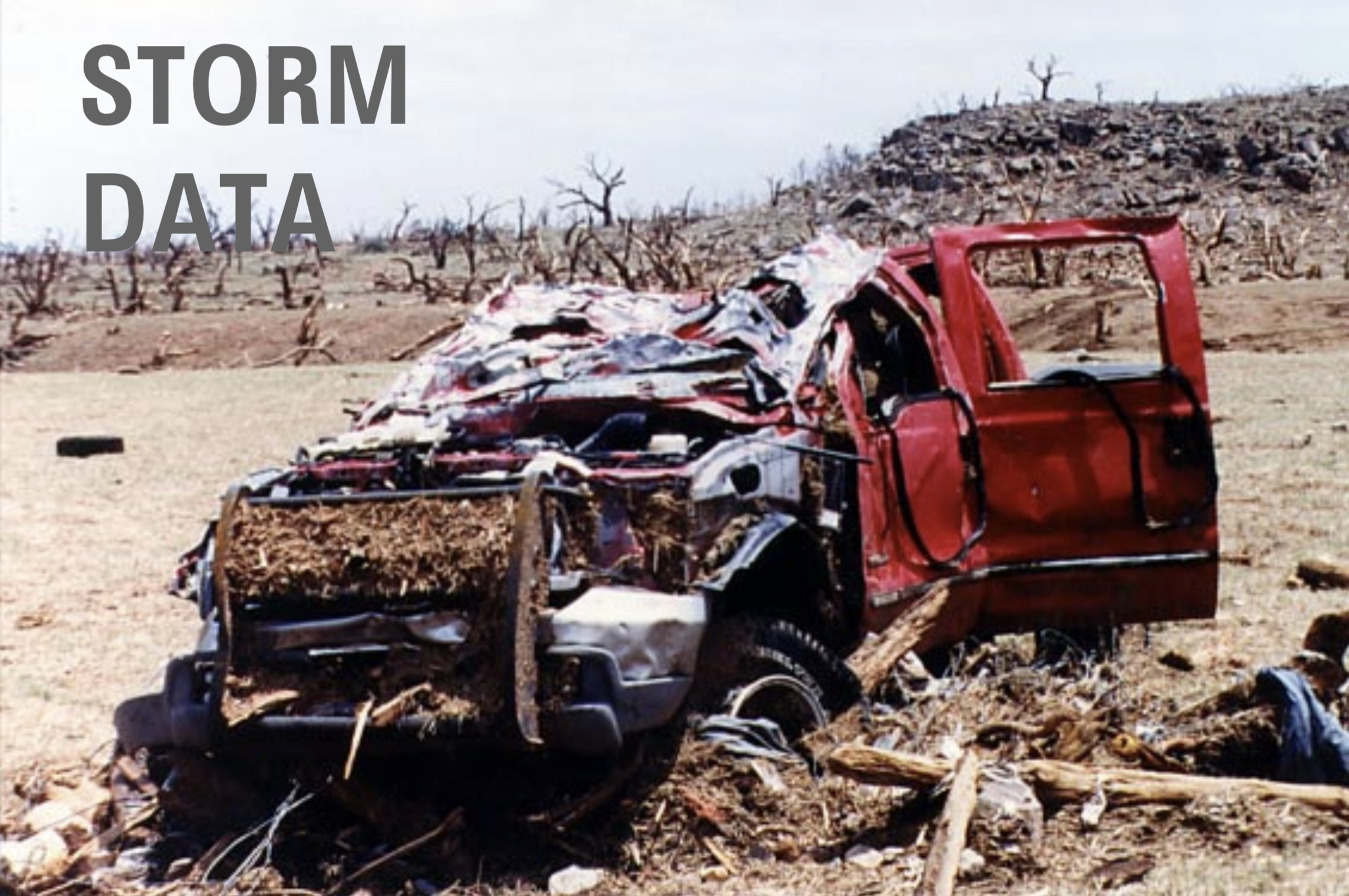
A pickup truck destroyed by the tornado. This photograph was used as the cover of the May 1999 Storm Data publication from the National Oceanic and Atmospheric Administration.

The tornado touched down 9 miles (14 km) northwest of Loyal Valley near the Llano River. The National Weather Service (NWS) office in San Angelo noted that this was an extremely slow-moving tornado, which tracked approximately 7 miles (11 km). Along the path, two homes were obliterated, with debris being scattered "great distances". One home was completely swept away, with its foundation said to be gone. Parts of a pickup truck were found 0.75 miles (1.21 km) from the house. In another home, a person was killed and five others were injured after they took shelter in a car, which was located in a stone garage. As the tornado destroyed the house, the car was smashed, resulting in the casualties. At times, the tornado's width grew to 0.75 miles (1.21 km) wide. Sixteen other homes sustained damage, along with the complete destruction of several barns and outbuildings. As the tornado crossed Farm-to-Market Road 152, a 720 feet (220 m) stretch of asphalt was ripped off the road surface. In total, the tornado killed one person, injured six others, and caused $1 million (1999 USD) in damage as it traveled at an average forward speed of 10 miles per hour (16 km/h).

A reporter said: "I hadn't seen anything like that. I couldn't believe what it did to animals. This was wiped clean, too, but the cattle – their hides had been ripped right off of them. Some of them were missing heads, and some were caught up and entwined in barbed wire." Meteorologist Bill Hecke believed the tornado was capable of devastation comparable to that suffered by Oklahoma City in the Bridge Creek–Moore tornado or damage from the 1997 Jarrell F5 Tornado.

=== Possible F5 intensity ===
In 2023, the NWS office in San Angelo stated this was the strongest tornado ever recorded in their forecasting area and that "considerations were made for an F5 rating". However, the survey found that the structures impacted were not built well enough to ultimately warrant the F5 rating.

== See also ==
- List of F4 and EF4 tornadoes
