= Frederick George Carrington =

English journalist

Frederick George Carrington (1816–1864) was an English journalist.

== Life ==
The third son of Nicholas Toms Carrington, he was about 14 at the time of his father's death. His eldest brother Henry E. Carrington, proprietor of the Bath Chronicle, took him on, and he became a journalist.

Carrington contributed to the West of England journals: the Bath Chronicle, Felix Farley's Bristol Journal, the Royal Cornwall Gazette, the West of England Conservative, the Bristol Mirror, the Gloucester Journal, and the Gloucestershire Chronicle (where he was for several years editor and proprietor). He also contributed to magazines, and wrote treatises on Architecture and Painting for the Society for the Diffusion of Useful Knowledge.

In the Encyclopædia Britannica, eighth edition, Carrington supplied topographical descriptions of Gloucestershire and other counties. He died at Gloucester on 1 February 1864, aged 47, and was buried in the cemetery there. He left a wife and six children.

== Notes ==
Attribution

This article incorporates text from a publication now in the public domain: Stephen, Leslie, ed. (1887). "Carrington, Frederick George". Dictionary of National Biography. Vol. 9. London: Smith, Elder & Co.
