= Nicholas Toms Carrington =

Nicholas Toms Carrington (also Noel Thomas) (1777–1830) was an English schoolmaster and poet.

== Life ==
The son of a retail grocer at Plymouth, Carrington was born there. Shortly his parents moved to Plymouth Dock, and for some time he was employed as a clerk in the Plymouth dockyard. Then he became a seaman on board a man-of-war, and was present at the Battle of Cape St Vincent (1797).

After his term of service Carrington settled at Maidstone, Kent, where for five years he taught a public school. In 1809, with support from friends, he established a private academy at Plymouth Dock, which he then ran until six months before his death, 2 September 1830.

== Works ==
At an early period of his life Carrington, who was a member of The Plymouth Institution (now The Plymouth Athenaeum), began to contribute verse to London and provincial papers. His poems are mainly descriptive of the scenery and traditions of Devon. In 1820 he published The Banks of the Tamar, and in 1826 Dartmoor. His collected poems, with a memoir, appeared in two volumes in 1831.

== Family ==
The journalist Frederick George Carrington was his third son.

== Notes ==
Attribution

This article incorporates text from a publication now in the public domain: Stephen, Leslie, ed. (1887). "Carrington, Noel Thomas". Dictionary of National Biography. Vol. 9. London: Smith, Elder & Co.
