= Johnny Ringo =

US criminal and gunfighter (1850–1882)

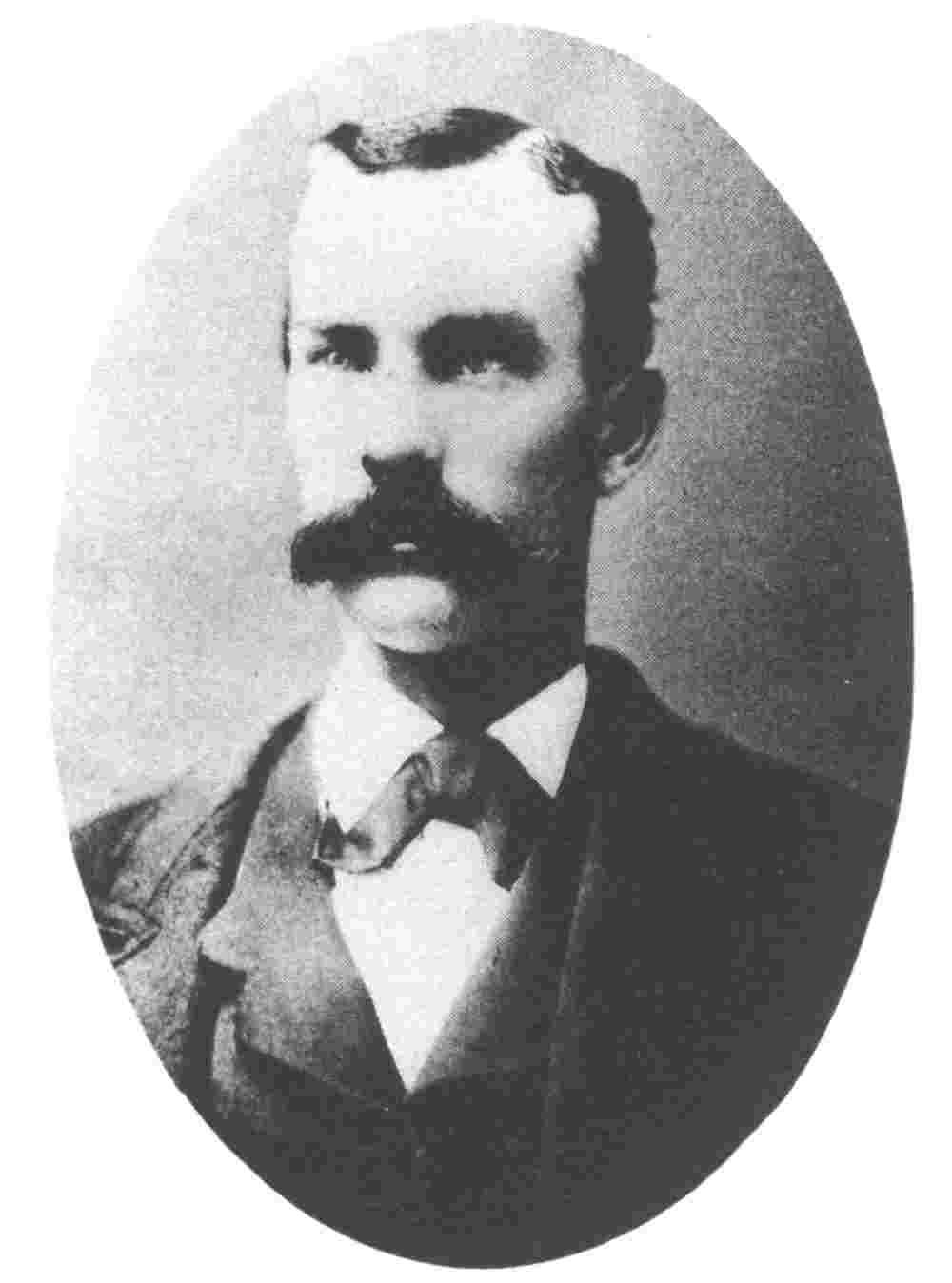
- Ringo c. 1880
- Born: John Peters Ringo; May 3, 1850; Greens Fork, Indiana
- Died: July 13, 1882 (aged 32); Chiricahua range, Cochise County, Arizona Territory
- Cause of death: Suicide
- Body discovered: Turkey Creek Canyon, Arizona Territory
- Resting place: East Turkey Creek Road, Pearce, Arizona (private property); 31.865868°N 109.418852°W
- Other names: Johnny Ringo, Johnny Ringgold
- Occupation: Outlaw
- Years active: 1875–1882

John Peters Ringo (May 3, 1850 – July 13, 1882) was an American Old West outlaw loosely associated with the Cochise County Cowboys in frontier boomtown Tombstone, Arizona Territory. He took part in the Mason County War in Texas, during which he committed his first murder. He was arrested and charged with murder. He was affiliated with Cochise County Sheriff Johnny Behan, Ike Clanton, and Frank Stilwell during 1881–1882. He got into a confrontation in Tombstone with Doc Holliday and was suspected by Wyatt Earp of having taken part in the attempted murder of Virgil Earp and the ambush and death of Morgan Earp. Ringo was found dead with a bullet wound to his temple, which was ruled suicide. Modern writers have advanced various theories attributing his death to Wyatt Earp, Doc Holliday, Frank Leslie, or Michael O'Rourke.

== Early life ==
Johnny Ringo, son of Martin and Mary Peters Ringo, had distant Dutch ancestry, and was born in what later became the small town of Greens Fork, Clay Township, Wayne County, Indiana. His family moved to Liberty, Missouri, in 1856. He was cousin related by marriage to the Younger brothers through his aunt Augusta Peters Inskip, who married Coleman P. Younger, uncle of the outlaws.

In 1858, his family moved from Liberty to Gallatin, where they rented property from the father of John W. Sheets, who became the first "official" victim of the James–Younger gang when they robbed the Daviess County Savings and Loan Association in 1869.

On July 30, 1864, when Johnny was 14, his family was in Wyoming en route to California. His father, Martin Ringo, was killed when he stepped off their wagon holding a shotgun, which accidentally discharged. The family buried Martin on a hillside alongside the trail.

== Mason County War ==
Ringo left his mother, brother, and sisters in San Jose, California, in 1869 and moved to Mason County, Texas. He befriended an ex-Texas Ranger Scott Cooley, who was the adopted son of rancher Tim Williamson.

Trouble started when two American rustlers, Elijah and Pete Backus, were dragged from the Mason jail and lynched by a predominantly German mob. Full-blown war began on May 13, 1875, when Tim Williamson was arrested by a hostile posse and murdered by a German farmer named Peter "Bad Man" Bader. Cooley and his friends, including Johnny Ringo, conducted a terror campaign against their rivals. Officials called it the "Mason County War"; locally it was called the "Hoo-doo War". Cooley retaliated by killing local German ex-deputy sheriff John Worley, then taking his scalp and tossing his body down a well on August 10, 1875.

Cooley already had a reputation as a dangerous man and was respected as a Texas Ranger. He killed several others during the "war". After Cooley supporter Moses Baird was killed, Ringo murdered James Cheyney on September 25, 1875, with a friend named Bill Williams. They rode up to Cheyney's house. Cheyney (who had led Baird into the ambush) greeted them unarmed, invited them in, and began washing his face on the porch. Both Ringo and Williams shot and killed him. The two then rode to the house of Dave Doole and called him outside, but he came out with a gun and they fled back into town.

Sometime later, Scott Cooley and Johnny Ringo mistook Charley Bader for his brother Pete and killed him. Both men were jailed in Burnet, Texas, by Sheriff A. J. Strickland, but Ringo and Cooley soon broke out of jail with the help of their friends, and they parted company to evade the law.

The Mason County War ended around November 1876 after about a dozen individuals had been killed. Scott Cooley was thought to be dead and Johnny Ringo and his friend George Gladden were in jail. One of Ringo's alleged cellmates was notorious killer John Wesley Hardin. While Gladden was sentenced to 99 years, Ringo appears to have been acquitted. Two years later, Ringo was a constable in Loyal Valley, Texas. Soon after this, he traveled to Arizona.

== Life in Tombstone ==
Ringo first appeared in Cochise County, Arizona Territory, in 1879 with Joseph Graves Olney (alias "Joe Hill"), a friend from the Mason County War. In December 1879, a drunk Ringo shot unarmed Louis Hancock in a Safford, Arizona, saloon when Hancock refused a complimentary drink of whiskey, stating that he preferred beer. Hancock survived his wound. Soon after arriving in Tombstone, Arizona, he met editor Sam Purdy of The Tombstone Epitaph, who later writes of their talk: "He said that he was as certain of being killed as he was of living then. He said that he might run along for a couple years more, and may not last two days." In Tombstone, Ringo developed a reputation as having a bad temper. He may have participated in robberies and killings with the Cochise County Cowboys, a loosely associated group of outlaws. Occasionally but erroneously, he was referred to as "Ringgold" by local newspapers. He described himself as a "speculator" in the 1882 Cochise County Great Register.

=== Confrontation with Doc Holliday ===
On January 17, 1882, Ringo and Doc Holliday traded threats and seemed headed for a gunfight. Both men were arrested by Tombstone's sheriff, James Flynn, and hauled before a judge for carrying weapons in town. Both were fined. Judge William H. Stilwell followed up on charges outstanding against Ringo for a robbery in Galeyville and Ringo was rearrested and jailed on January 20 for the weekend. Ringo was suspected by the Earps of taking part in the December 28, 1881, ambush of Virgil Earp, that crippled him for life, and the March 18, 1882, murder of Morgan Earp while he was shooting pool in a Tombstone saloon.

=== Joins posse pursuing Earps ===
Deputy U.S. Marshal Wyatt Earp and his posse killed Frank Stilwell in Tucson on March 20, 1882. After the shooting, the Earps and a federal posse set out on a vendetta to find and kill the others they held responsible for ambushing Virgil and Morgan. Cochise County Sheriff Johnny Behan received warrants from a Tucson judge for arrest of the Earps and Holliday. He deputized Ringo and 19 other men, many of them friends of Stilwell and the Cochise County Cowboys.

During the Earp vendetta ride, Wyatt Earp killed one of Ringo's closest friends, "Curly Bill" Brocius, in a gunfight at Iron Springs (later Mescal Springs) about 20 miles (32 km) from Tombstone. Earp told his biographer, Stuart Lake, that a man named Florentino Cruz confessed to being the lookout at Morgan's murder and identified Ringo, Stilwell, Swilling, and Brocius as Morgan's killers. The local posse pursued and came close to the federal posse at Henry C. Hooker's ranch, but never faced the Earp lawmen. Former Pima County Sheriff Bob Paul, who had been in Tombstone at the time and volunteered to ride with the Behan posse, wrote a letter to the Tucson Citizen on March 3, 1898, in response to an earlier story he said was full of errors. He said the Earp posse had told Hooker to tell Behan and his posse where they were camped. Hooker told Behan where the Earps were camped, but the posse left in the opposite direction.

== Death ==
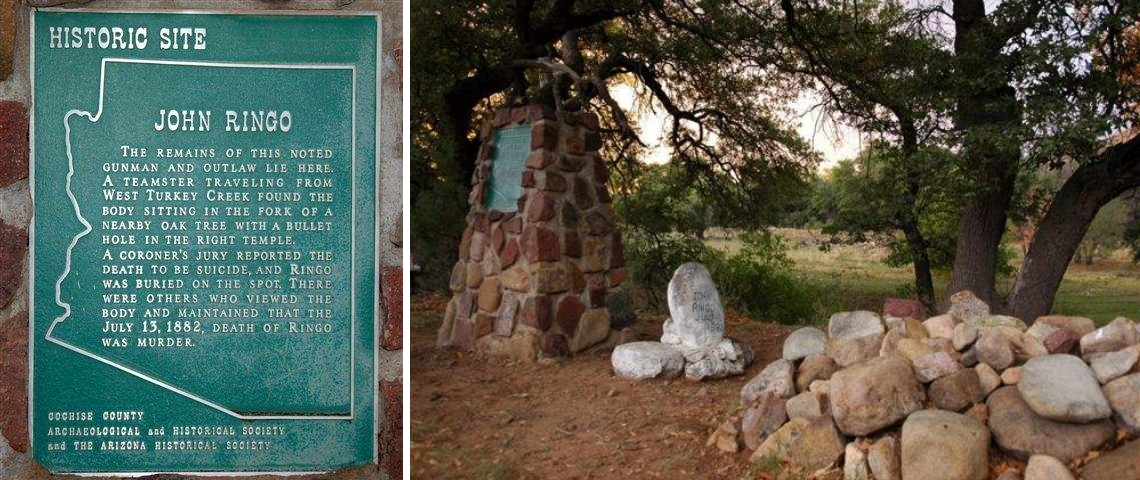
Memorial plaque and grave of Johnny Ringo on private property

During Tombstone's Fourth of July festivities, Ringo drank heavily. He left town two days later, taking several bottles of liquor for the ride. Deputy Billy Breakenridge saw him two days later near Dial's Ranch in the South Pass of the Dragoon Mountains. He later wrote, "Ringo was very drunk, reeling in the saddle." He encouraged Ringo to follow him back to the Goodrich Ranch, but "he was drunk and stubborn and went on his way. I think this was the last time he was seen alive." Around 3:00 pm on July 13, ranch hands at a nearby ranch heard a shot.

=== Suicide ===
Teamster James Yoast was hauling wood when he found Ringo's body on July 14, seated in "a bunch of five large black jack oaks growing up in a semicircle from one root, and in the center of them was a large flat rock which made a comfortable seat." He was "not more than 700 feet from Smith's house" in West Turkey Creek Valley, near Chiricahua Peak in Arizona Territory. His body had already turned black from the desert heat.

His feet were wrapped in strips of cloth torn from his undershirt. Ringo had lost his horse with his boots tied to the saddle. The coroner's report noted, "He had evidently traveled but a short distance in this foot gear." A bullet hole was in his right temple and an exit wound was in the back of his head. The fatal wound was upward at a 45° angle between the right eye and ear. His revolver was still in his right hand.

According to the coroner's report, Ringo's Colt Single Action Army .45 revolver held five cartridges. A knife cut was found at the base of his scalp, as if "someone had cut it with a knife." His horse was found 11 days later about 2 miles (3.2 km) away with Ringo's boots still tied to the saddle. A coroner's inquest officially ruled his death a suicide.

Ringo's body is buried near the base of the tree where it was discovered. The grave is located on private land. A gate on a nearby road permits visitors to view the site. Despite the coroner's ruling and contemporaneous newspaper reports that Ringo had "frequently threatened to commit suicide, and that the event was expected at any time", alternative theories of doubtful plausibility about Ringo's death have been proposed over the years. Some assert that the lack of powder burns on his head suggest he was shot from a distance. The coroner's jury report does not mention the presence or absence of powder burns. Furthermore, Ringo's body was already turning black due to decomposition.

Robert Boller, a member of the coroner's jury, wrote in 1934, "I showed [James Yoast] where the bullet had entered the tree on the left side. Blood and brains [were] oozing from the wound and matted his hair. There was an empty shell in the six-shooter and the hammer was on that. I called it a suicide fifty-two years ago, I am still calling it suicide. I guess I'm the last of the coroner's jury."

=== Wyatt Earp claims ===
According to the book I Married Wyatt Earp (1976), which author and collector Glen Boyer claimed to have assembled from manuscripts written by Earp's fourth wife, Josephine Marcus Earp, Earp and Doc Holliday returned to Arizona with some friends in early July and found Ringo camped in West Turkey Creek Valley. As Ringo attempted to flee up the canyon, Earp shot him with a rifle. Boyer refused to produce his source manuscripts, and by the 1980s, critics were skeptical of the book's claims. In 2006, New York Times contributor Allen Barra wrote: I Married Wyatt Earp "... is now recognized by Earp researchers as a hoax."

Tombstone historian Ben T. Traywick thought the story about Earp's involvement was credible, reasoning that only Earp had sufficient motive to kill Ringo, he was probably in the area at the time, and near the end of his life, Earp had told one historian "in circumstantial detail how he killed John Ringo". Earp was interviewed in 1888 by an agent of California historian Hubert H. Bancroft, and in 1932, Frank Lockwood, who authored Pioneer Days in Arizona, wrote that Earp told both of them that he killed Ringo as he left Arizona in March 1882 – almost four months before Ringo died. He included other details that do not match what is known about Ringo's death. Earp repeated his story to at least three other people. In an interview with a reporter in Denver in 1896, Earp denied that he had killed Ringo, but later, privately, he claimed once again that he had.

=== Doc Holliday story ===
The Holliday theory is similar to the Earp theory, except that Holliday is alleged to have killed Ringo. A variant, popularized in the movie Tombstone, asserts that Holliday stepped in for Earp in response to a gunfight challenge from Ringo and shot him. Records of the [Pueblo County District Court indicate that Holliday and his attorney appeared in court on July 11, 14, and 18, 1882 to answer charges of "larceny". However, a writ of capias was issued for him on the 11th, suggesting that he did not, in fact, appear in court on that date. Ringo's body was found on the 14th. Six days before Ringo's death, the Pueblo Daily Chieftain reported that Holliday was in Salida, Colorado, about 670 miles (1,080 km) from Turkey Creek, Arizona, and then in Leadville, about 700 miles (1,100 km) distant, on July 18. An arrest warrant still was outstanding on Holliday in Arizona for his part in Frank Stilwell's murder, making his having entered Arizona at that time unlikely.

=== Michael O'Rourke theory ===
Some accounts attribute Ringo's death to Michael O'Rourke, an itinerant gambler who was arrested in Tucson in January 1881 on suspicion of murdering a mining engineer named Henry Schneider. Wyatt Earp is said to have protected him from being lynched by a mob organized and led by Ringo. O'Rourke escaped from jail in April 1881 and never stood trial on the murder charges.

The last documented sighting of O'Rourke was in the Dragoon Mountains near Tombstone during May 1881, "well-mounted and equipped", and presumably on his way out of the territory. From then on, he is referred to only in unsubstantiated rumors and legends; according to one, a combination of the debt he owed Earp and the grudge he held against Ringo prompted him to return to Arizona in 1882, track Ringo down, and kill him. While some sources consider the story plausible, others point out that O'Rourke, like Holliday, would have been reluctant to re-enter Arizona with a murder warrant hanging over his head, particularly to commit another murder.

=== Frank Leslie claim ===
While in the Yuma Territorial Prison for killing his wife, Buckskin Frank Leslie reputedly confessed to a guard that he had killed Ringo. Few believed his story, and some thought he was simply claiming credit for it to curry favor with Earp's inner circle, or for whatever notoriety it might bring him.

== In popular culture ==
=== Film and television ===
The character of Johnny Ringo has been depicted in these film and television shows:

- The Gunfighter (1950) depicts Jimmy Ringo, a fictional depiction of Johnny Ringo's life.
- City of Bad Men (1953) played by Richard Boone
- The Life and Legend of Wyatt Earp includes two episodes depicting Ringo. John Pickard played the role in 1957; Peter M. Thompson did so in 1959.
- In "The Johnny Ringo Story" (March 17, 1958), an episode of Tales of Wells Fargo, he was portrayed by Paul Richards.
- Gunfight at the O.K. Corral (1957), portrayed by John Ireland
- "Johnny Ringo's Last Ride" (1958) is an episode of the ABC series Tombstone Territory, starring Myron Healey.
- Johnny Ringo, starring Don Durant, aired for one season (1959–1960) on CBS. It depicted virtually nothing about Ringo's actual life.
- In "The Melancholy Gun" (1963), an episode of the syndicated television anthology series Death Valley Days, he was portrayed by Ken Scott.
- Ringo and His Golden Pistol, a Sergio Corbucci spaghetti Western, features a character called Johnny Ringo in the English-dubbed version, though no reference is made to any real-life deeds or companions of the historical Ringo, and he is depicted as being of Mexican ancestry.
- The High Chaparral (1969) included two appearances of Ringo, portrayed first by Robert Viharo and then by Luke Askew.
- The Gunfighters (1966), the eighth serial of the third season of Doctor Who, he was portrayed by Laurence Payne. Strangely, Ringo is depicted as one of the cowboys killed in the Gunfight at the O.K. Corral.
- In Doc (1971), Ringo was played by Fred Dennis.
- In Tombstone (1993), he was played by Michael Biehn.
- For the film Wyatt Earp (1994), Norman Howell portrayed Ringo.

=== In music ===
- "Johnny Ringo" is a song on Crown the Empire's Limitless EP. Also, the songs "Johnny's Revenge" and "Johnny's Rebellion" are part of this trilogy.
- "Ringo" (1964), was a chart number-one hit for Lorne Greene.

=== In literature ===
Confessions of Johnny Ringo, a fictionalized memoir, depicts Ringo as a bookish and introspective observer of his era, whose sweetheart is killed by Union troops during the Civil War. He is driven to become an outlaw until he is killed by Wyatt Earp.
