= James Young (Arizona pioneer) =

African-American Old West figure (1844–1935)

- Born: July 15, 1844; Nashville, Tennessee
- Died: January 19, 1935 (aged 90); Tucson, Arizona
- Occupations: Arizona pioneer; Boxer; Trailblazer; Miner; Hostler; Ranch worker; Bodyguard; Buffalo Soldier; Indian Scout
- Years active: 1860–1930

James Young (July 15, 1844 – January 19, 1935) was an American boxer, Arizona pioneer, trailblazer, Buffalo Soldier, Indian Scout, and miner for several years in Tombstone, Arizona. His claim to fame was as a boxer during the mid-1880s.

== Early life ==
James Young was born into slavery in July 1844 in Nashville, Tennessee, the son of parents from Tennessee. Young had married twice. His first wife died prior to 1880, and he then married Rosa Romero, who was born in 1856 in Mexico. Young resided in the Tombstone, Arizona, area for 56 years, from 1879 to 1935.

== Boxing ==
When James Young was in his late thirties in 1883, he gained a reputation as an African-American boxer in Tombstone, Arizona, owing to his imposing size and skill – while still employed in the variety of fields which provided his income. On September 22, 1883, Young, who weighed 175 pounds and was over six feet tall, fought 165-pound pugilist Neil McLeod. There is some controversy among boxing historians over whether John L. Sullivan, of Boston, Massachusetts, had sparred with James Young at Schieffelin Hall in 1882. It is significant because Sullivan insisted that he never fought a black boxer. If it did occur, Sullivan possibly had a brief sparring session with the resident from Tombstone, and didn't regard it seriously as a bout.

== Confronts Buckskin Frank Leslie ==
James Young had two encounters with Buckskin Frank Leslie, and Leslie backed down both times. Young was an early arrival in Tombstone, Arizona and had worked in the Contention mine and staked a claim nearby. When he found that Leslie had jumped his claim, Young approached him with a shotgun, and beckoned him to go back to town quickly. Leslie shrugged it off and explained that he had heard that some others were about to jump Young's claim, and he had gone there to help him stand them off. When the news about the stand-off went around town, James Young's prestige rose and Frank Leslie's faltered some. Later, when Leslie met Young in a store, unarmed and with his back turned, Leslie pulled his gun out of its holster and was about to use it. The woman store owner screamed and jumped between the two men. Again, Buckskin shrugged it off and said he was just checking his six-gun to see that it was in good working order. Young was very strong, which provided the means to earn a living in his various physical occupations. Leslie was known as being quick with a six-gun, yet was diminutive in stature, but known for killing Billy Claiborne in 1882.

== Mining altercation ==
On May 14, 1893, A. T. Shuster and James Young had words over an incident in front of Bauer's Meat Market in Tombstone, Arizona. This resulted in Shuster wielding a five-pound chunk of gold ore at Young's head. Young was quick to catch the missile, but threw his wrist out, in the process. Shuster was charged with assault with intent to do great bodily harm. A. T. Shuster later became the Justice of the Peace for Tombstone Precinct in October 1898.

== Later years ==
James Young was an imposing figure in Tombstone, Arizona well into his eighties. In 1929, Tombstone recognized him as one of its remaining residents from its early days of the Earps, and he rode in the town's first Helldorado Days Parade. Young died on January 19, 1935, in Tucson, Arizona, after having been a resident of the Cochise County Hospital. He was buried at Holy Hope Cemetery in Tucson, Arizona.
