= Jimmy Young =

Jimmy Young may refer to:

- Jimmy Young (American football) (born 1987), NFL wide receiver for the Pittsburgh Steelers
- Jimmy Young (boxer) (1948–2005), American heavyweight boxer
- Jimmy Young (broadcaster) (1921–2016), English singer and radio personality
- Jimmy Young (sportscaster), radio host for Boston Celtics games
- James Young (comedian) (1918–1974) Northern Irish actor and comedian also known as Our Jimmy.

== See also ==
- Jim Young (disambiguation)
- James Young (disambiguation)
