= Mason County War =

Period of lawlessness in old west Texas

- Part of the Range Wars
- Date: 1875–1876
- Location: Mason County, Texas, United States
- Also known as: The Hoodoo War
- Deaths: 12 killed

The Mason County War, sometimes called the Hoodoo War in reference to masked members of a vigilance committee, was a period of lawlessness ignited by a "tidal wave of rustling" in Mason County, Texas in 1875 and 1876. The violence entailed a series of mob lynchings and retaliatory murders involving multiple posses and law enforcement factions, including the Texas Rangers. The conflict took the lives of at least 12 men and resulted in a climate of bitter "national prejudice" against local German-American residents in the following years.

== Background ==
Cattle rustling had long been a problem for Texas ranchers by the time of the Mason County War. Organized bands frequently stole livestock but the situation was made worse by the fact that spring trail bosses were often "indifferent to whose cows they drove", picking up "mavericks" (unbranded animals) and even other brands, though the understanding was that they were supposed to return the profits to the rightful owner.

Ethnic Germans had immigrated to Mason and Gillespie counties in central Texas beginning in the 1840s, largely as a result of efforts to colonize the Fisher–Miller Land Grant. The Germans often found hardship in the ranching business; though "loyal to their adopted country and government when undisturbed", they "were sorely tried by the rustlers and Indians, who committed many depredations upon their cattle." In 1860, Mason County's first sheriff, Thomas Milligan, was killed by Indians.

In 1872, the predominantly German population of the county elected Sheriff John Clark and Cattle Inspector Dan Hoerster. Clark and Hoerster organized a posse to deal with the increasingly severe cattle rustling in the area and reclaim lost cattle. They soon came across a herd stolen by the Backus brothers gang and eight others; the posse captured five of the rustlers, who were taken back to the Mason jail. The captives included Lige Backus, Pete Backus, Charley Johnson, Abe Wiggins and Tom Turley.

== Beginning ==
A posse member, Tom Gamel, later claimed that Clark and Hoerster suggested lynching their captives. Regardless, a mob of forty attempted to break into the jail on the night of February 18, 1875 with a battering ram after failing to get the keys from the jailer, Deputy John Wohrle. Both Sheriff Clark and the visiting Texas Ranger Lt. Dan W. Roberts were prevented from interfering with a warning they would be shot. Despite this, Clark managed to gather a posse of about six citizens and, with Roberts, pursued the mob to the south edge of town where they were hanging the prisoners from a large post oak. By the time the posse reached the mob, Lige and Pete Backus and Abe Wiggins were dead, but they managed to save Tom Turley while Charley Johnson escaped.

This was the beginning activity of the vigilance committee, or Hoodoos, who used ambushes and midnight hangings to get rid of the thieves and outlaws who had been holding a "carnival of lawlessness in Mason County".

== Reign of terror intensifies ==
Tom Gamel learned he was the target of the vigilance committee on March 25, prompting him to gather his friends and proceed into town in an effort to confront the threat, but Sheriff Clark immediately left. Gamel's group left after a couple of days but returned when Clark returned with 62 men, all Germans, and both groups agreed to peace with "no more mobs or hanging".

However, in May, Deputy Wohrle arrested the "prominent and popular American" Tim Williamson, after Dan Hoerster revoked his year-old bond for stealing a yearling. Williamson worked for Charley Lehmberg in Loyal Valley, known for paying five dollars a head for unbranded cattle. Wohrle and Williamson were confronted a short distance from the ranch by a dozen men led by German rancher Peter Bader, who shot Williamson dead. This murder increased the tension between the American and German factions enormously, especially after a grand jury on May 12 failed to indict those responsible.

== Cooley's actions ==
Among those now involved was Scott Cooley, an orphan raised by the Williamson family who vowed "he would get the men who did it". Cooley had been carried off by Indians after they killed his parents, but later raised by the Williamsons. Cooley served in Texas Rangers Company D under Captain Perry before taking up farming near Menardville. After Williamson's murder, Cooley came to Mason, learning as much as he could about the circumstances and the names of those involved. His first act of revenge occurred on August 10, when Cooley shot Worhle in the back of the head while he helped Doc Charley Harcourt dig a well, taking Worhle's scalp as would an Indian.

Cooley formed a gang whose members included George Gladden, John and Mose Beard and Johnny Ringo. Gladden and Mose Beard were ambushed south of Mason by sixty men led by Peter Bader, Dan Hoerster and Sheriff Clark, resulting in the death of Beard. Cooley's men, including Johnny Ringo, then killed Cheney at his home, who had led Beard and Gladden into the ambush. Hoerster was killed as he rode past the Mason barber shop by Scott Cooley, Gladden and Bill Coke. The next day, Coke was captured and killed by a Mason posse at John Gamel's.

== Texas Rangers arrive ==
Under orders from Governor Richard Coke, Major Jones of the Texas Rangers arrived on September 28, with ten men from Company D (Cooley's old unit) and thirty men from Company A, his escort under Captain Ira Long. Jones promptly sent scouts looking for Cooley but without result after two weeks.

The remaining justice of the peace, Wilson Hey, issued warrants for Sheriff Clark and others, who were arrested, and although the charges did not stick, Clark did resign his office and was never seen again. Major Jones' scouts continued to seek Cooley and his gang to no avail, which prompted Jones to confront his Rangers with the opportunity for those in sympathy with Cooley to "step out of the ranks", of which fifteen did. The remaining Rangers captured Gladden and Ringo.

In November, Scott Cooley's gang killed Charley Bader at his place, and Peter Bader soon met the same fate. At the end of December 1875, Cooley and Ringo were arrested by Sheriff A.J. Strickland for threatening the life of Burnet County Deputy Sheriff John J. Strickland. They later escaped from the Lampasas County jail with the help of forty "Helping Hands".

== Aftermath ==
The summer of 1876 was another period of terror and lawlessness before Cooley died, either by poison after dining at the Nimitz Hotel in Fredericksburg or by "brain fever" or due to previous wounds.

Johnny Ringo left the state for the Arizona Territory, where he again earned a reputation as a cattle rustler and criminal, and George Gladden was imprisoned for the murder of Peter Bader. On January 21, 1877, the Mason County Courthouse was burned to the ground and the official records of the Mason County War were destroyed.
