= James Jubilee Young =

James Jubilee Young (1887 - 1962) was a baptist minister. He was born on 15 May 1887 in Maenclochog, Pembrokeshire.

As a minister Young worked primarily at Pontypridd (where he was ordained in 1910), and around Llanelli. As a noted preacher, he was frequently invited to events in major cities, including London and Liverpool, and to preside over meetings in Wales.

Young retired in 1957, and died on 23 January 1962. He had a wife, Mya (née Jones of Capel Rhondda), and one son.
