= James M. Young (politician) =

Mississippi legislature

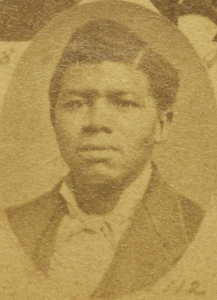

James M. Young was a state legislator in Mississippi. He represented Panola County, Mississippi in the Mississippi House of Representatives in 1878 and 1879.

In 1884 he was accused of shooting Alfred Fields. In 1885, Fields was accused of attempting to bribe Young.

== See also ==
- African American officeholders from the end of the Civil War until before 1900
