= James Young (cricketer) =

South African cricketer (1913–1994)

Personal information
- Full name: James Oswald Young
- Born: 28 June 1913; Port Elizabeth, Cape Province, South Africa
- Died: 7 March 1994 (aged 80); Port Elizabeth
- Batting: Right-handed
- Bowling: Right-arm fast-medium

Domestic team information
- Years: Team
- 1935/36–1952/53: Eastern Province

Career statistics
Competition	First-class
Matches	35
Runs scored	1,097
Batting average	21.94
100s/50s	1/4
Top score	110*
Balls bowled	7,529
Wickets	80
Bowling average	28.88
5 wickets in innings	3
10 wickets in match	0
Best bowling	5/35
Catches/stumpings	19/–
- Source: CricketArchive, 22 May 2014

James Oswald Young (28 June 1913 – 7 March 1994) was a South African cricketer who played first-class cricket for Eastern Province from 1936 to 1953.

In 1947–48, in his first match as Eastern Province captain, Young scored one of the fastest centuries in South African cricket, against Orange Free State. Going to the wicket on the first day of the match with the score at 48 for 6, he reached 100 in 62 minutes, and finished on 110 not out in a total of 196. Eastern Province won by 60 runs. He later captained Eastern Province in 1949–50, 1950–51 and 1952–53, his last season, when he also took his best bowling figures, 5 for 35, in another victory over Orange Free State.
