= Buckskin Frank Leslie =

American soldier, conman, and convicted criminal (1842–1927)

Nashville Franklyn Leslie
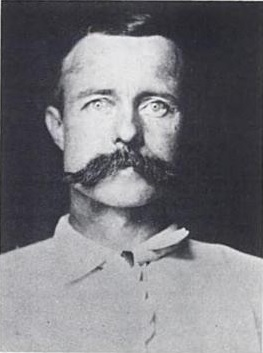
- Nashville Franklyn "Buckskin Frank" Leslie
- Born: March 18, 1842; San Antonio, Texas
- Died: Unknown (after January 27, 1920)
- Other names: Buckskin Frank Leslie; Nashville Franklyn Leslie; Capt. N. Frank Leslie
- Occupations: U.S. Army scout, gambler, miner, rancher, gunfighter
- Known for: Killing Mike Killeen and Billy Claiborne
- Height: 5 ft 7 in (1.70 m)
- Spouses: Mary Jane (Evans) Killeen; Belle Stowell; Elnora (Torbert) Cast
- Status: Pardoned in 1896
- Conviction: Murder of Molly Edwards
- Penalty: 25 years

Buckskin Franklyn Leslie (March 18, 1842 – after 1920) was a U.S. Army scout, gambler, bartender, rancher, miner, gunfighter, and con-man. He was known for his fringed buckskin jacket. He became well-known in Tombstone, Arizona, for killing two men in self-defense. He married the widow of one of his victims eight days after killing her husband. Following their divorce, Leslie later shot and killed a woman he lived with at his ranch while drunk and in a fit of jealousy. He was sentenced to life in prison, but only served six years before he was pardoned. He was last listed in the U.S. Federal Census on January 27, 1920, in Sausalito, California. No public records of him have been found after this date, and it is not known when he died.

== Early life ==
=== Born in Texas ===
Leslie was born as "Nashville Franklyn Leslie" near San Antonio, Texas. Conflicting accounts of his early life exist. In 1913, Leslie wrote on his marriage certificate that he was the son of Bernard Leslie from Virginia, and Martha Leslie of Kentucky. The Tombstone Daily Prospector reported on July 15, 1889 that Leslie was born in Galveston, Texas in 1842 where he supposedly grew up. They stated that his father was Thomas Kennedy and his mother was Martha Leslie. The story reports that he took his mother's last name after a falling out with his father, though they did not provide any sources. In terms of his height, which is an important historical aspect for some, as stated above, he grew to 5’7”, a relatively robust height (N.B. Average height of this era is based on data which is largely unsubstantiated from an evidentiary perspective) for this era.

=== Imaginative personal history ===
Nothing has been documented concerning Leslie's first 36 years, although he told some colorful and improbable stories concerning those missing years. On two separate occasions, Leslie told writers his version of incidents from his early life. In 1880, Leslie said, "in 1861 I joined the Southern Army, and continued with it till April 9th 1865, when I was attached to General Gordon's division as a First Lieutenant, in the 10th Cavalry." He claimed he "was Deputy Sheriff of Abilene... under the notorious lawman J.B. Hickok or 'Wild Bill,' "and that he was a "rough rider in Australia," and a [ship] pilot in the Fiji Islands and that he "has exhibited, as a fancy rifle shootist in different parts of the world."

In 1893, he related another story to W.H. Cameron of the San Francisco Chronicle, in which he claimed that the story of his life was a romance. Born in Virginia [sic] in 1842 of a good family, he went to Heidelberg to study medicine. At the same time, his brother attended West Point for a military education. When the Civil War broke out in 1861, Frank returned to his old home in Virginia [sic] and entered the Confederate Army as a bugler while his brother joined the Union forces.

Leslie also claimed that he served as a scout for the U.S. Army in Texas, Oklahoma, and the Dakotas during the 1870s, but no documentation has been found.

== San Francisco ==
Leslie was first recorded in San Francisco in 1878 where he was employed as a barkeeper in Thomas Boland's saloon at 311 Pine Street. He lived in San Francisco at 732 Howard Street. In 1879 he was a "bookkeeper," which may have been a typo for "barkeeper," since he worked at Kerr & Jurado's Saloon & Billiard Room. The next year he was again listed as a barkeeper in the same establishment and was living at 746 Folsom Street. In mid-1880, he moved to Tombstone, Arizona.

== Tombstone, Arizona ==
Leslie arrived in Tombstone, in July 1880 dressed in the buckskin attire of a scout. He was 5 feet 7 inches (1.70 m) tall and weighed about 135 pounds (61 kg). When he arrived in Tombstone, he traded his frontier clothing for gentleman's attire like that worn in San Francisco. He complemented his city dress with a fringed buckskin vest that furthered his reputation as "Buckskin Frank" Leslie. In Tombstone, he entered a partnership with William H. Knapp, and opened the Cosmopolitan Saloon next door to the Cosmopolitan Hotel at 409 Allen Street.

=== Kills Mike Killeen ===
Leslie was attracted to a chambermaid at the Cosmopolitan Hotel named Mary Jane "May" Killeen. He attended her wedding to Mike Killeen on April 13, 1880, in Tombstone, and was one of the two witnesses listed on the marriage record. Mike Killeen was jealous of the relationship between May and Leslie. (Note: May Killeen was born Mary Jane Evans in Kentucky on May 25, 1856. Michael D. "Mike" Killeen was born in Illinois in 1848. Killeen was then employed as a bartender at Lowry and Archer's Saloon in Tombstone. DeMattos, Buckskin Frank Leslie Revealed, p. 19)

Late in the evening of June 22, 1880, Leslie had his arm around May as they sat on the front porch of the Cosmopolitan Hotel. George M. Perine, a friend of Leslie, saw May's husband approaching, and warned Leslie, but not before Killeen fired his gun twice. The bullets grazed Leslie's head, and stunned him. Killeen attacked Leslie, and began clubbing him with his revolver when Killeen was shot, and mortally wounded. Before he died five days later, on June 28, Killeen told E.T. Packwood that Perine had shot him. Both Leslie and Perine were charged with murder, but Leslie claimed he had fired in self-defense, and that Perine had not fired his weapon. The court accepted Leslie's explanation, and dismissed charges against both men.

=== Marries Mary Killeen ===
Eight days after her husband's death, Mary Killeen married Leslie. For the second time (within 84 days), 13 year-old Louisa E. Bilicke served as the bride's maid of honor. The Tombstone Epitaph reported:

July 6, 1880, Wedding - Last evening, at 8 o'clock, Mr. N.F. Leslie (Nashville Franklyn) was united in holy bonds of matrimony to Mrs. Mary Killeen, (née Evans) by Judge Reilly. The wedding was a quiet one, only a few intimate friends of the parties being present. Miss [Louisa] Billicke attended the bride, Col. C.F. Hines supporting Mr. Leslie. There were present during the ceremony, which took place in the parlor of the Cosmopolitan Hotel, Mr. and Mrs. Bilicke, Col. H.B. Jones and wife, Mr. C.E. Hudson and daughter, Miss French, Col. Hafford, Mr. E. Nichols, Mr. J.A. Whitcher, Mr. Maxon, Mr. J.A. Burres, Mr. Geo. E. Whitcher, F.E. Burke, Esq., and Mr. Fred Billings. At the conclusion of the ceremony the bridal party and friends repaired to the dining room of the hotel, where a bounteous repast awaited them. The EPITAPH congratulates Mr. Leslie, un chevalier sans peur et sans reproche, [a knight without fear and reproach] and his most estimable wife upon this happy event, and earnestly wishes them a pleasant voyage over life's troubled ocean.

=== Confrontations with James Young ===
James Young had two encounters with Buckskin Frank Leslie and Leslie backed down both times. Young was an early arrival in Tombstone, Arizona and had worked in the Contention mine, and staked a claim nearby. When he found that Leslie had jumped his claim, Young approached him with a shotgun, and beckoned him to go back to town quickly. Leslie shrugged it off, and explained that he had heard that some others were about to jump Young's claim, and he had gone there to help him stand them off. When the news about the stand-off went around town, James Young's prestige rose, and Frank Leslie's faltered some. Later, when Leslie met Young, unarmed and with his back turned, in a store, Leslie pulled his gun out of its holster and was about to use it. The woman store owner screamed and jumped between the two men. Again, Buckskin shrugged it off and said he was just checking his six-gun to see that it was in good working order.

=== Kills Billy Claiborne ===
A major fire swept Tombstone on May 26, 1882, which destroyed Knapp & Leslie's Cosmopolitan Saloon. The partners decided against rebuilding and Leslie took a job tending bar at the Oriental Saloon, one of the few buildings still standing.

Leslie was tending bar at the Oriental on November 14, 1882, when Billy Claiborne, who was very drunk, began using insulting and abusive language. Leslie asked Claiborne to leave, but Claiborne continued his foul and abusive speech. Leslie grabbed Claiborne by his coat collar and escorted him out. Leslie later testified, "He used very hard language, and as he started away from me, shook a finger at me and said, 'That's all right Leslie, I'll get even on you.' "

Within a few minutes, two men told Leslie there was a man waiting outside to shoot him. When Leslie stepped outside, he saw "a foot of rifle barrel protruding from the end of the fruit stand." He tried to talk Claiborne out of shooting, but Claiborne raised his rifle and fired the weapon, missing Leslie. Leslie returned fire, hitting Claiborne in the chest. "I saw him double up and had my pistol cocked and aimed at him again... I advanced upon him, but did not shoot, when he said, 'Don't shoot again, I am killed.' "

Leslie had planned that day to travel to the Dragoon Mountains with George W. Parsons, but the trip was cancelled. Parsons described Claiborne's death, writing that, "Frank didn't lose the light of his cigarette during the encounter. Wonderfully cool man." The coroner's inquest concluded that Leslie shot Claiborne in self-defense, which "in the opinion of the jury, was justifiable."

=== The Magnolia Ranch ===
At the end of 1882, Milton E. Joyce sold his share in the Oriental Saloon and he and Leslie entered a partnership to build a ranch near Arizona's Swisshelm Mountains. The "Magnolia" was located 19 miles (31 km) from Tombstone in a very desolate section of southeastern Arizona. Milt Joyce sold Leslie his share of the ranch in 1885. (Note: According to his obituary in the Dec. 2, 1889, San Francisco Bulletin, Milton E. Joyce was born in Missouri during 1847, and died in San Francisco on November 29, 1889. His partner, James W. Orndorff, was born in Ohio on April 7, 1834, and died in San Francisco on February 16, 1923)

=== Becomes cavalry scout ===
From May 20 to June 21, 1885, Leslie became a scout for the 4th Cavalry. In 1886, he applied for a job as a customs inspector and continued some work as a scout. In the April, 1886 the San Francisco Chronicle reported:

The celebrated scout, Frank Leslie, known as Buckskin Frank, at present a mounted Inspector of Customs, arrived here this evening. Mr. Leslie was for many years Chief of Scouts, and is in the confidence of General Crook, and is personally acquainted with Geronimo and other leading chiefs. He has just arrived from the camp of the hostile prisoners, at White's ranch. He had a long conversation with the hostiles who have been on the warpath all summer; also with General Crook and staff."

=== Divorce ===
Mary Jane "May" Leslie filed a divorce complaint and alleged that Leslie was intimate with "Miss Birdie Woods" between July 4–6, 1886. (Note: On May 17, 1886, the Daily Tombstone reported that "the Crystal Palace has secured the services of Miss Birdie Woods of San Francisco, who will make her first appearance this evening as a vocal and instrumental musician.") She also charged that Leslie had choked and beaten her on March 9, 1887. The divorce was granted on June 3, 1887. Judge William H. Barnes ordered Leslie to pay her $650 in cash and to convey title to a one-fourth interest in the Magnolia Ranch, including 13 horses and 150 cattle. Leslie was also ordered to pay all legal fees. (Note: Mary Jane "May" Evans Killeen Leslie married a third husband, Alexander Durward (1854-1922), in Tombstone, on October 12, 1889. She died in Banning, California, on March 27, 1947, at the age of ninety)

=== Murders Mollie Edwards ===
After his divorce, Mollie Edwards joined Leslie at his ranch as his "wife," (Note: Mollie Edwards was most likely her real name. Other contemporary newspaper accounts identified her as "Mollie Williams." She was also known as "Mollie Bradshaw," when she was living in Tombstone with a man named Bradshaw) but that relationship ended on July 10, 1889 when Leslie returned to his ranch drunk. He found Mollie Edwards sitting and talking with James Neil. The Tombstone Daily Epitaph reported:

Neil said that ... when Leslie returned ... he came into the room where Neil and the woman were talking and without a warning said: 'I'll settle this!' and fired at the woman who fell from the chair without uttering a sound. Leslie then turned and fired two shots at Neil, the first taking effect in his left breast, near the nipple, and the other hitting him in the arm. He was unarmed and got out of the way [escaped] as soon as possible."

Neil was badly wounded and was brought back to Tombstone where he was treated by one of the foremost surgeons in treating a gunshot wound in the United States, Dr. George E. Goodfellow on July 12, 1889. Leslie was arrested the same day and put in jail. After a two-day preliminary hearing, Leslie was ordered held without bail until his trial in Tucson. Four days after killing Edwards, the coroner's jury reported:

After inspecting the body of the deceased and hearing the testimony we find that the person killed was formerly known as Mollie Edwards; that at the time of her death Frank Leslie claimed her as his wife; that on Wednesday, the 10th day of July, 1889, at a place in Cochise County known as "Leslie's Ranch," she came to her death by being shot with a pistol and by criminal means; and that she was, on the day aforesaid, shot and killed by Frank Leslie."

Leslie pleaded guilty "to murder in the first degree" on January 6, 1890, The Sacramento Daily Record-Union reported:

It is expected he will receive a life sentence at Yuma. Leslie was noted for his bravery during the Custer massacre, when he was in the employment of the Government as a scout, and rendered valuable services to the Government under Crook and Miles in this section during the campaign of Geronimo and his band of cutthroats. He was a partner of the late M.E. Joyce, of the Baldwin Hotel, in a large cattle ranch in this country."

=== Sentenced to life ===
Leslie was sentenced to life in prison. Sheriff John Slaughter delivered him to the Yuma Territorial Prison on January 9, 1890, where he became convict number 632. The Mohave Miner, on January 18, 1890, reported, "The eleven convicts who were brought here from Tombstone yesterday, arrived in an intoxicated condition. One of the number, a life prisoner, Frank Leslie, was so drunk that he could scarcely walk."

Leslie was in prison less than three months when he joined five other convicts in an unsuccessful escape attempt. Leslie was sent to solitary confinement for his part in the escape attempt. When he was released from solitary confinement, he became a model prisoner and worked as a pharmacist in the prison infirmary. W.H. Cameron, a reporter for the San Francisco Chronicle, interviewed Leslie in late 1893.

His lot in prison is not a hard one. He does not wear the prison garb and is not confined to a cell at night. His conduct is perfect. Superintendent [Thomas] Gates said that he was the best-behaved prisoner, as well as the most useful in the penitentiary. In case of sickness the physician is called in and diagnoses the case, while Leslie fills the prescription and administers the medicine. His drug store is the acme of neatness."

=== Pardoned by Arizona Governor ===
After reading the story in the San Francisco Chronicle, a 36-year-old San Francisco divorcee named Belle Stowell began writing Leslie. The Tombstone Prospector (June 29, 1896) reported, "It is probable that Frank Leslie, who was sentenced from this county to Yuma for life for murder, is likely soon to be a free man, as the Gazette states that executive clemency is likely to be extended in his behalf by Gov. Franklin." On November 17, 1896, Governor Benjamin J. Franklin of the Territory of Arizona granted Leslie a full and unconditional pardon. Leslie quickly left the state, going to Los Angeles, where he checked into the Natick House.

== Later life ==
=== Marries Belle Stowell ===
Leslie later took a train to Stockton, California, and on December 1, 1896, Belle Stowell went to the San Joaquin County Clerk's office and obtained a marriage license. Leslie identified himself as "Nashville Franklyn Leslie, native of Virginia [sic], age 55," and stated that he was a "resident of San Carlos, Territory of Arizona." His bride described herself as "Mrs. Belle Stowell, native of Warren County, Illinois, age 39, resident of Warren Co., Illinois." (Note: Leslie once again spelled his middle name as "Franklyn," rather than "Franklin" on his marriage license. He also repeated his false claim of a Virginia birth on the form, as he had in the San Francisco Chronicle profile of December 2, 1893. Most likely he repeated it on the license for the benefit of his bride, who first became aware of Leslie because of that San Francisco Chronicle article, and may have found a Virginia birth part of his appeal) The Stockton Daily Independent reported that "their wedding trip was to be to China, the start to be made by the next steamer," but they never made it to China. Four months later, the San Francisco Call, reported that, "Mrs. Leslie is at present in this state, but it is said that her husband cannot be located... It is not known whether they have separated or not, but it is believed that they have." The marriage was not legally ended until March 19, 1903, when it was reported Belle was granted the divorce from Leslie “for failure to provide."

=== Fort Worth ===
In April 1897, Leslie arrived in Fort Worth, where he joined an Arizona friend named John Ralph "Jack" Dean. Leslie worked for Dean as a bartender in the Delaware Cafe. On January 17, 1898, the newspaper reported that he and a group of men formed "the charter of the Copper River Gold Mining and Prospect Company of Fort Worth was sent to Austin in charge of F.A. Mason, Capt. N.F. Leslie and Silas L. King today. This is the company which has been formed there to prospect in the Alaskan gold fields." Leslie apparently never went to Alaska, for, in early April 1898, he was in Mexico. He was reported to be with "Doctor George Goodfellow and Tom Selby of San Francisco, at Hermosillo preparing for a trip to the interior."

=== Possible service in Spanish–American War ===
Leslie apparently didn't stay in Mexico long. He claimed that he enlisted, fought, and was wounded in the Spanish–American War. The San Francisco Call later published a lengthy story written by Leslie in which he claimed that, "when Roosevelt commenced his recruitment I enlisted in one of the first companies formed in Arizona, and after arriving in Cuba was transferred by my own request to Lawtons's command and remained with him until the end of Spain's dominion in the western hemisphere. At the end of the War I returned to Arizona." (Note: The full page article was headlined, "Personal Experiences With the Late General Lawton Told by Captain N. Frank Leslie, His Chief of Scouts in the Apache Campaign.")

=== Mining in Mexico ===
If Leslie actually served in the Spanish–American War, he later traveled to Tombstone early in August, 1898, serving as a guide for a geological survey party looking for coal deposits. An Arizona paper reported that "since leaving Arizona Leslie has been in Cuba and returned wounded. After recovery he joined this surveying party and it is expected they will be engaged hereabouts for several months." The geological survey party was led by Professor Edwin Theodore Dumble. According to one Arizona newspaper "Prof. Dumble and his right hand man, Capt. Frank Leslie, have been in Nogales several days making arrangements for a month's stay in the field." Leslie was in the vicinity of Guaymas, Sonora, Mexico, during the late summer of 1899 when he had a close call. According to one report, "Captain Frank Leslie, well known all over Arizona, was held up by Yaquis and robbed. They took all his arms, mount etc., and turned him loose."

Leslie briefly returned to San Francisco but in 1900, he went to Mexico to work for the Mulatos Mining Company. Leslie wrote about the mining company's activities for a Nogales newspaper on March 14, 1902.

=== Return to San Francisco ===
Leslie was one of four well-dressed men, along with Harry Walters, T. Estrau and T.E. Gaitwere, who in November 1900, attempted to fleece J.P. Reynolds, a Nevada mining-man. The would-be victim sensed that the men were trying to defraud him, and got away before losing any money. "As Reynolds did not suffer from his experience with the bunko men, the officers were unable to hold them on any other charge except vagrancy." Leslie and the other men were arrested and charged with vagrancy at the city prison.

In another incident in December 1902, Leslie asked George V. Fause of Humboldt County for directions to a park in San Francisco. He befriended Fause and led him to a room in a lodging house on the southwest corner of Bush and Kearney Street, where Leslie and other men got Fause to give them a check for $675, which they promptly cashed at the Anglo-California Bank. When Fause left the place he ran into two policemen and told them of the fraud. The officers went back to the house as one of the men came out the front door. "When he saw the officers he started to run, but was soon overtaken and conveyed to the City Prison. He gave his name as Frank Leslie and his occupation as a horseman. Leslie was booked on a charge of grand Larceny by trick and device."

On November 25, 1902, Leslie was in San Francisco when his pistol fell out of his pocket, discharged, and wounded him. According to the San Francisco Chronicle:

Frank Leslie fell a victim to his own pistol early yesterday morning. Up to a recent date he had been engaged in mining in Mexico, and is in the habit of carrying an automatic pistol in his inner vest pocket. Yesterday morning while in a saloon at Market and Ellis streets, he stooped over, the weapon fell out of his pocket, fell to the floor and was discharged. The bullet struck him about four inches above the knee, passing through the fleshy part of the leg, tore his right ear and cut a gash in his scalp. He was taken to the Receiving Hospital and treated by Dr. Weyer.

=== Homestead claim filed in Seattle ===
On March 13, 1913, while living in Seattle, Leslie filed a homestead for property on Orcas Island. The homestead was contested a year later as Leslie "failed to reside, or attempted to cultivate the land." Leslie had boarded with John Dean and his wife. They looked for him and John reported Leslie had gone to Mexico City for mining business. The homestead claim was canceled on February 14, 1914.

== Marriage and death ==
Leslie married Elnora "Nora" Cast in Napa, California on November 6, 1913. When he was married, Leslie reported his occupation as miner. At age 74 on May 20, 1916, Leslie was in Seattle where he was interviewed by a reporter from the Seattle Daily Times about a trip he was planning to Mexico. Leslie was living in Sausalito, California, on Water Street on January 27, 1920. He was 77 years old and single. No public records of him have been found after this date, and it is not known when he died.

== Photographs of Buckskin Frank Leslie ==
The most produced photograph of Buckskin Frank Leslie is the one taken at the Yuma Territorial Prison in November 1893, at the request of a San Francisco Chronicle reporter, for an interview. During the 1880s, there was also a photograph taken in a studio setting by a photographer, that depicts a well-dressed Frank Leslie. In December 2017, a previously unpublished photograph of Buckskin Frank Leslie was discovered, which depicts Leslie circa 1915, when he was in his seventies, and wearing his famous buckskin jacket. In that photograph, Frank Leslie was no longer sporting his sweeping moustache. The back of the photograph was inscribed "Nashville Frank Leslie".

== Television portrayal ==
The actor Anthony Caruso played Leslie in the 1958 episode, "The Gunsmith," of the syndicated television anthology series, Death Valley Days, hosted by Stanley Andrews. Robert Fuller, prior to Laramie, was cast as gunsmith Alex. In the story line, Leslie comes to town to see his old flame Mary (Anita Gordon), Alex's fiancé who wants nothing to do with Leslie.

== Bibliography ==
- Chaput, Don. "Buckskin Frank" Leslie, Tucson, AZ: Westernlore Press, 1999. ISBN 0-87026-107-X
- DeMattos, Jack. "Gunfighters of the Real West: Buckskin Frank Leslie," Real West, September 1981.
- DeMattos, Jack. Buckskin Frank Leslie Revealed, Wild West History Association Journal (Vol. VIII, No. 3) June, 2015.
- DeMattos, Jack and Parsons, Chuck. They Called Him Buckskin Frank: The Life and Adventures of Nashville Franklyn Leslie, Denton, TX: University of North Texas Press, 2018. ISBN 978-1-57441-712-8
- Leslie, Nashville Franklyn. "Personal Experiences With the Late General Lawton Told by Captain N. Frank Leslie, His Chief of Scouts in the Apache Campaign," San Francisco Call, Sunday, January 7, 1900.
- Martin, Douglas D. Silver, Sex and Six Guns: Tombstone Saga of Buckskin Frank Leslie, Published by The Tombstone Epitaph, 1962.
- O'Neal, Bill. "Buckskin Frank Leslie vs Billy the Kid Claiborne," True West, March 1991.
- Rickards, Colin. Buckskin Frank Leslie: Gunman of Tombstone, El Paso, TX: Texas Western Press, 1964.
- Scott, Jay. "Buckskin Frank: Tombstone Lady Killer," True Western Adventures, April 1961.
- Traywick, Ben T. Tombstone's "Buckskin Frank": Nashville Franklyn Leslie, Tombstone, AZ: Published by Red Marie's, 2013.
