= Jim Young (St Finbarr's hurler) =

Irish hurler

Personal information
- Native name: Séamus de Siún (Irish)
- Born: Cork, Ireland

Sport
- Sport: Hurling
- Position: Forward
Club
- Years: Club
- 1880s–1890s: St Finbarr's
Club titles
- Cork titles: 1
Inter-county
- Years: County
- 1893–1894: Cork
Inter-county titles
- Munster titles: 1
- All-Irelands: 2

Jim Young was an Irish sportsperson. He played hurling with his local club St Finbarr's and was a member at senior level of the Cork county team from 1893 until 1894.

== Playing career ==
=== Club ===
Young played his club hurling with the St Finbarr's club and had much success throughout the first decade of club activity in Cork. He won a county senior championship title with 'the Barr's' in 1899.

=== Inter-county ===
Young first came to prominence on the inter-county scene with Cork as part of the Blackrock selection in 1893. He missed Cork's Munster final triumph; however, he was included on the team for the subsequent All-Ireland final meeting with Kilkenny. Cork won the game on probably the most unsuitable playing field in hurling history. After someone had neglected to get the grass cut at Ashtown, both teams moved to the Phoenix Park where the game took place. A 6–8 to 0–2 victory gave Young an All-Ireland title.

For a second consecutive year in 1894 Young was selected for championship duty with Cork. An easy 3–4 to 1–2 defeat of Tipperary in the provincial decider gave him a Munster winners' title. For the second time in three years Dublin provided the opposition in the subsequent All-Ireland final. The game turned into an absolute rout as Cork won easily bu 5–20 to 2–0. With that Young captured a second consecutive All-Ireland winners' medal. It was his last game with the Cork hurling team.

== Honours ==
=== St Finbarr's ===
- Cork Senior Hurling Championship:
  - Winner (1): 1899

=== Cork ===
- All-Ireland Senior Hurling Championship:
  - Winner (1): 1893, 1894
- Munster Senior Hurling Championship:
  - Winner (1): 1894

== Sources ==
- Corry, Eoghan, The GAA Book of Lists (Hodder Headline Ireland, 2005).
- Cronin, Jim, A Rebel Hundred: Cork's 100 All-Ireland Titles.
- Donegan, Des, The Complete Handbook of Gaelic Games (DBA Publications Limited, 2005).
