= James Yonge (physician) =

English physician (1794–1870)

James Yonge (1794–1870) was for many years one of the chief physicians of the west of England.

== Biography ==
Yonge was a direct descendant of James Yonge (1646–1721). He was the fourth son of Duke Yonge, vicar of Otterton, Devonshire, and his wife Catherina, daughter of Thomas Crawley-Boevey of Flaxley Abbey, Gloucestershire. He was born in Devonshire in 1794, and educated at Eton and Exeter College, Oxford, where he graduated B.A. on 13 May 1815, M.A. on 22 October 1817, M.B. on 8 June 1819, and M.D. on 20 June 1821.

He was elected a fellow of the College of Physicians of London on 30 Sept. 1822, practised in Plymouth, was physician to the Devonshire and Cornwall Hospital, and was for many years one of the chief physicians of the west of England. He died on 3 January 1870.

== Family ==
Yonge married his cousin, Margaret, daughter of Sir Thomas Crawley-Boevey, baronet.
