= Scott Cooley =

Old West Texas ranger

Scott Cooley (c. 1845 – June 1876) was an Old West Texas Ranger and later outlaw, best known for his association with gunman Johnny Ringo.

== Biography ==
Cooley was born in Texas, and was unofficially adopted as a boy and raised by rancher Tim Williamson. As a child, Tim Williamson and his wife nursed Cooley through a serious illness when he contracted typhoid, and Cooley treated the couple with the utmost respect. He joined the Texas Rangers as a young man. He was well respected as a lawman, and even feared due to his relentless pursuit of outlaws. However, on May 13, 1875, Tim Williamson was falsely arrested in Mason County, Texas for cattle rustling by Deputy Sheriff John Worley (sometimes spelled John Worhle). While Williamson was being escorted to jail by Worley, an angry mob of German cattle ranchers jerked him aside and shot him to death. This event marked the beginning of what would be called the Mason County War, known also as the "Hoodoo War".

When Cooley received the news at the Texas Ranger camp where his Ranger Company was based, he broke into uncontrollable crying, which quickly turned to anger. Cooley blamed Worley for Williamson's death, believing that he was in cahoots with the Germans, as Worley was of German descent. However, he waited for indictments to be passed down from the court against those responsible for Williamson's death, but when none came, he took matters into his own hands. Cooley went to Worley's home, where Worley was working on his well with a helper. Cooley shot and killed Worley on sight. He then scalped him, and displayed the scalp as a prize to the Germans. Cooley then killed German cattleman Charley Bader. By that time gunman Johnny Ringo had joined Cooley, along with several others. Two of Ringo's friends, Moses Baird and George Gladden, were ambushed shortly thereafter by a posse led by Sheriff John Clark, during which Baird was killed and Gladden seriously wounded. That posse included Peter Bader, brother to Cooley's second victim, Carl Bader.

Johnny Ringo and a friend named Bill Williams rode boldly into Mason, Texas on September 25, 1875, riding up in front of the house of James Cheyney, the man who led Gladden and Baird into the ambush. As Cheyney came out, both Ringo and Williams shot and killed him. The two then rode to the house of Dave Doole, and called him outside, but when he came out with a gun, they fled back into town. Four days later, Scott Cooley and John Baird, brother to Moses Baird, then killed German cowboy Daniel Hoerster, and wounded Germans Peter Jordan and Henry Plueneke. The German cattlemen then retaliated, hanging two men they suspected had assisted Cooley. The next day Texas Rangers arrived, finding the town in chaos, and Cooley and his faction gone. Major John B. Jones of the Texas Rangers dispatched three parties to pursue Cooley and his followers. The next day local Sheriff John Clark dispatched a posse of deputies to arrest Bill Coke, suspected of assisting Cooley. Coke was located and arrested, but allegedly "escaped" while on the way to town. Coke was never seen again, and it is suspected that the posse executed him. Charley Johnson, a friend to Bill Coke, then appeared in town looking for blacksmith William Miller, who had been a member of the posse that arrested Coke. He found Miller at his workplace, and shot him down. Badly wounded, Miller was saved only by his wife running outside and throwing herself toward him, at which point Johnson simply walked away.

By this time, killings were almost random. There was no local law enforcement to speak of, as the sheriff was obviously supporting the German cattlemen, and no arrests had been made against either side short of the arrest of Bill Coke. The Texas Rangers were also doing little to help matters, as many were friends to Scott Cooley. Frustrated, Major Jones asked that if any of them felt they could not perform their duty by pursuing Cooley, they should step forward. Fifteen of them did so, willing to accept discharges rather than to pursue Cooley. The Texas Governors office was by this time receiving letters in support of Cooley, stating the local sheriff was in support of the German cattlemen, which was filtering down on Major Jones, prompting him to act swiftly.

At the end of December, 1875, Cooley and Ringo were arrested by Sheriff A. J. Strickland for threatening the life of Burnet County, Texas Deputy Sheriff John J. Strickland. They later escaped from the Lampasas County, Texas jail, with the help of friends, but their arrests essentially stopped the violence. Just like Bill Coke, Cooley reportedly escaped a posse near the Llano River and was never officially seen again. He is believed to have either been wounded by that posse and died after fleeing into Blanco County, Texas, or to have died due to what was referred to as "brain fever" shortly thereafter. He is believed to have been hiding out at the Nimitz Hotel in Fredericksburg, Texas at the time. However, neither of the reported death scenarios has ever been confirmed.
