= I Married Wyatt Earp (film) =

1983 TV film

- Logo for I Married Wyatt Earp
- Genre: Western
- Written by: I.C. Rapoport
- Directed by: Michael O'Herlihy
- Starring: Marie Osmond; Bruce Boxleitner; John Bennett Perry
- Music by: Morton Stevens
- Country of origin: United States
- Original language: English

Production
- Executive producer: Dennis Johnson
- Producer: Richard E. Lyons
- Production locations: Mescal, Arizona; Old Tucson – 201 S. Kinney Road, Tucson, Arizona; Sonoita, Arizona
- Cinematography: John C. Flinn III
- Editor: Fred A. Chulack
- Running time: 100 minutes
- Production companies: Comworld Productions; Osmond Productions

Original release
- Network: NBC
- Release: January 10, 1983

I Married Wyatt Earp is a 1983 American Western television film directed by Michael O'Herlihy. The film premiered January 10, 1983, on NBC. It is based on Josephine Earp's memoir of the same name and stars Marie Osmond as Josie Marcus, Bruce Boxleitner as Wyatt Earp, and John Bennett Perry as Johnny Behan.

== Plot ==
The movie tells the story of Josie Marcus (Marie Osmond), a young opera singer from San Francisco, who heads out west, where she meets, falls in love with, and marries legendary lawman Wyatt Earp (Bruce Boxleitner).

== Cast ==
- Marie Osmond as Josephine "Josie" Marcus
- Bruce Boxleitner as Wyatt Earp
- John Bennett Perry as Johnny Behan
- Jeffrey De Munn as Doc Holliday
- Allison Arngrim as Amy
- Ross Martin as Jacob Spiegler
- Ron Manning as Virgil Earp
- Josef Rainer as Morgan Earp
- Charles Benton as Ike Clanton
- Earl W. Smith as Frank Stillwell

== Production ==
=== Development ===
The University of Arizona Press published the memoir I Married Wyatt Earp in 1976, listing the author as Josephine Earp, and edited by Glenn Boyer. Some critics questioned Boyer's sources for the book, but Stephen Cox, then director of the University of Arizona Press, told the Arizona Daily Star in July 1998 that he stood behind the authenticity of the book. It is the second best-selling book about Western Deputy U.S. Marshal Wyatt Earp ever sold.

=== Filming ===
The TV movie was filmed in 1981 but not broadcast until 1983. It is Ross Martin's final performance.
