= Riverside Shakespeare =

Collections published by Houghton Mifflin

Cover of the 2nd edition

The Riverside Shakespeare is a long-running series of editions of the complete works of William Shakespeare published by the Houghton Mifflin company.

The first Riverside Shakespeare was edited by Richard Grant White and published in 1883 and 1901.

A new version was published in 1974 as a full scholarly edition, presenting each of the plays with introductions and textual notes, as well as several essays on Shakespeare's life and works. The general editor was G. Blakemore Evans. A revised edition was published in 1996, which is notable for being the first major complete works edition to include the disputed play Edward III, as well as A Funeral Elegy that was written by John Ford and is mistakenly attributed to Shakespeare here.

Newer editions are sold under the title the Wadsworth Shakespeare.
