= Richard Grant White =

19th-century American literary scholar

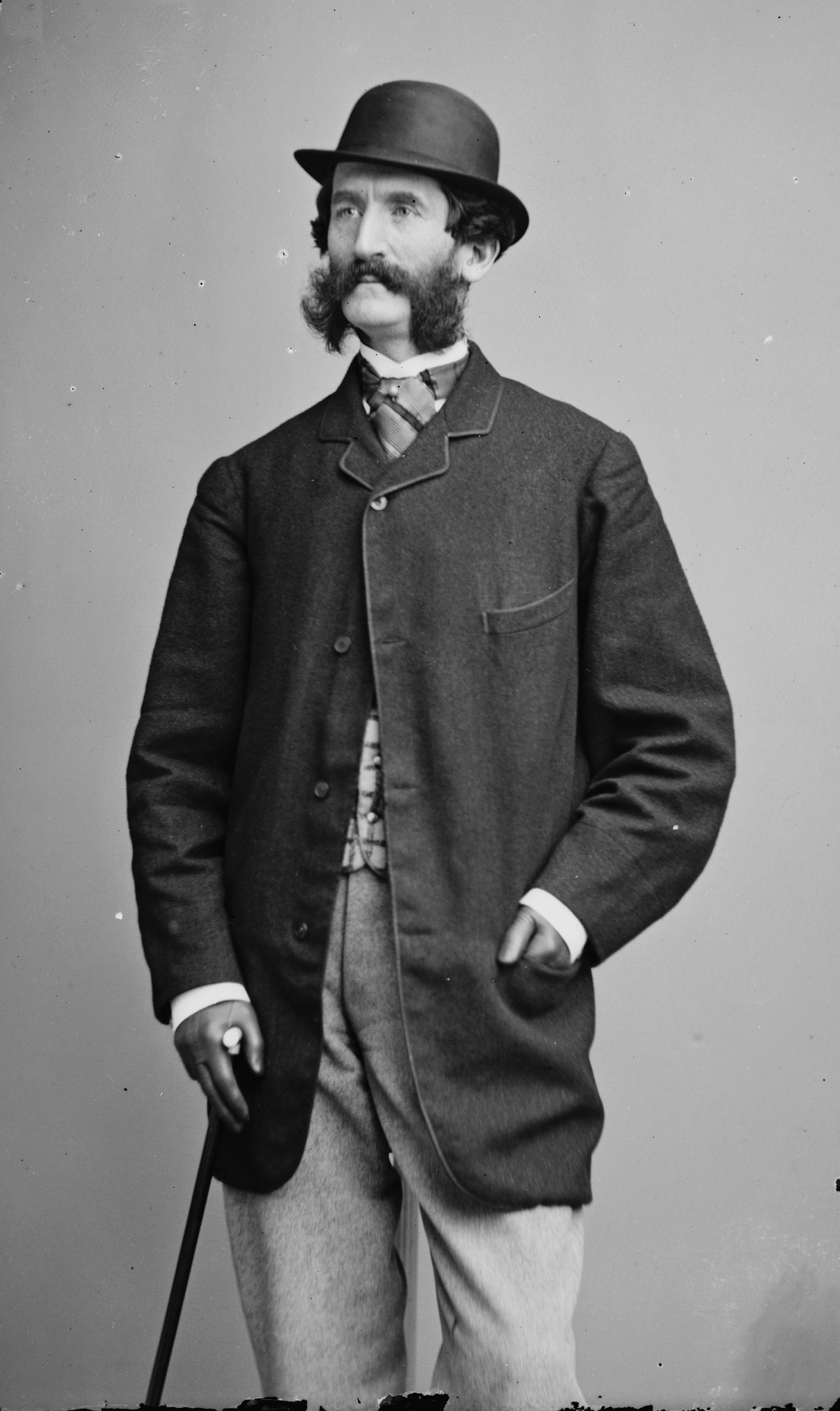
- Photograph of White by Mathew Brady, c. 1865
- Born: May 23, 1822; New York City, New York, U.S.
- Died: April 8, 1885 (aged 62); New York City, New York, U.S.
- Education: Columbia Grammar School
- Alma mater: Bristol College; New York University
- Spouse: Alexina Black Maese (after 1850)
- Children: Richard M. White; Stanford White
- Parent(s): Richard Mansfield White; Ann Eliza Tousey
- Relatives: Frances Elizabeth Barrow (sister-in-law)

Richard Grant White (May 23, 1822 – April 8, 1885) was one of the foremost literary and musical critics of his day. He was also a prominent Shakespearean scholar, journalist, social critic, and lawyer. He was born and died in New York City.

== Early life ==
White was born on May 23, 1822, in New York City to Richard Mansfield White (1797–1849) and Ann Eliza (née Tousey) (Note: White's mother's maiden name was either Tousey or Towsey.) White (1802–1842). He was eight in descent from John White, a puritan who was one of the founders of Cambridge, Massachusetts, and Hartford, Connecticut. His father, a shipping and commission merchant, was from a wealthy old New England family that lived in New York City. The elder White also served as secretary of the Allaire Iron Works company.

His father was the second son of the Rev. Calvin White (b. 1762), (Note: His great-grandfather was Moses White, himself the eldest son of Deacon Isaac White, who was born in Upper Middletown in 1727 and was a hatter by trade who married Huldah Knowles of Hartford, Connecticut, in 1749.) who was successively a Congregational, Presbyterian, and Episcopalian minister who became a Roman Catholic in 1821. His grandfather Calvin, who served as rector of Christ’s Church in Middletown, Connecticut, was first married to Phebe Camp and secondly to Jane Mardenbrough.

White prepared for college at Dr. Muhlenberg's Institute in Flushing on Long Island and Columbia Grammar School. He attended Bristol College in Pennsylvania from 1835 to 1837, and University of the City of New York (now known as New York University) beginning in 1837 and graduating with A.B. in 1839. He distinguished himself as a scholar of letters and mathematics and was the orator and Grand Marshal at Commencement. He later received a M.A. from New York University as well.

== Career ==
He studied medicine, with Dr. Alfred C. Post, and read law, with Judge Woodruff, and was admitted to the Bar in 1845. White, who was brought up as a patrician New Yorker, expected to receive a sizable inheritance from his father. The inheritance never materialized as his father was forced into bankruptcy and died in poverty in 1849 when his business was ruined by the advent of steam-powered shipping.

With no inheritance allowing a life of leisure, White worked as a lawyer and became one of the foremost literary and musical critics of his day. He had a distinguished career in journalism and literature as an editorial writer and musical critic for The Courier and Enquirer, continuing when it merged into The New York World. He wrote many books and articles for the leading American magazines, and contributed to Appleton's and Johnson's Cyclopedias. Words and Their Uses was one of his most noted books. White also authored several prominent national hymns. In an editorial in the New York Times after his death, it was written:

By the death of Mr. Richard Grant White American literature loses an interesting writer and a variously accomplished man. Mr. White's Shakespearean studies are, perhaps, the most satisfactory results of his scholarship; more so, certainly, than his labors in verbal criticism. In these latter an extreme sensitiveness led him to regard every difference of opinion as almost a personal offense, and by reason of this peculiarity of temper his abilities were rated by the reading public less highly than they really deserved.

While White wrote on a wide range of subjects, his essay "The Public-School Failure" from December 1880 established him as a prominent and controversial social critic. (Note: White relies in part on Zachariah Montgomery's book, The Poison Fountain for some arguments against public education.) His essay prompted several responses, including from the New York Times, which wrote in February 1881, "It is a libel, pure and simple, made up of an exaggerated statement of some of the poorest results contained in the report with some touches of false coloring. Mr. White's conclusions on the first count are, therefore, vitiated. His argument that the theory of public schools is false is a 'medley of fallacies.'"

Upon the outbreak of the U.S. Civil War, White became the chief of the United States Revenue-Marine (which later became the United States Coast Guard), an armed customs enforcement service, in New York. He served in this role from 1861 to 1878.

=== Shakespeare works ===
As one of the most acute students and critics of Shakespeare, White's scholarship was recognized and praised by scholars not just in the United States but in England, France, and Germany. He published two editions of Shakespeare's works and other works, including Essay on the Authorship of the Three Parts of Henry VI (1859), and Riverside Shakespeare (1883 and 1901): and "Shakespeare's Scholar". He also wrote books on subjects, such as 'Revelations: A Companion to the New Gospel of Peace " and a civil war satire, "The New Gospel of Peace, According to St. Benjamin". He was a vice-president of the New Shakespeare Society of London, England and edited a twelve-volume edition of Shakespeare from 1857 to 1865.

== Personal life ==
On October 16, 1850, he was married to Alexina Black Mease (1830–1921), the daughter of Charles Bruton Mease and Sarah Matilda (née Graham) Mease, a Charleston family who was then living in New York. At the time of their wedding, both the bride and groom were painted by Daniel Huntington. In 1860, they were temporarily living at Ravenswood in Long Island. They had two children:

- Richard Mansfield White (1851–1925), who was named after his father.
- Stanford White (1853–1906), a prominent Beaux-Arts architect and partner in the architectural firm McKim, Mead & White, who designed many houses for the rich as well as numerous public, institutional, and religious buildings. In 1906, he was murdered by millionaire Harry Kendall Thaw over White's relationship with Thaw's wife, actress Evelyn Nesbit.

White owned a violoncello now part of the collection at the Museum of Fine Arts in Boston, Massachusetts.

White died of pneumonia at his home on 330 East 17th Street in New York City on April 5, 1885. After a funeral at St. Mark's Church, he was buried at Rosedale Cemetery in Orange, New Jersey.

== Published works ==
On Shakespeare

- Memoirs of Shakespeare
- Studies in Shakespeare
- Shakespeare's Scholar (1854)
- Essay on the Authorship of the Three Parts of Henry VI (1859)
- Riverside Shakespeare (1883 and 1901)

Other topics

- The New Gospel of Peace by St. Benjamin (pseudonym used by White) (1866). A satire of the civil war written in biblical language.
- Words and their Uses (1870)
- Life of Pauline Markham (c. 1871), with Pauline Markham
- England Without and Within (Boston: Houghton, Mifflin and Co. 1881; London: Sampson Low & Co., 1881)
- The Fate of Mansfield Humphreys (1884), a novel
- Recent exemplifications of False Philology with contributions by Richard Grant White / by Fitzedward Hall. (This was a critique of Words and their uses.)
- National Hymns, How They are Written and How They are Not Written (1861)
