= Josephine Earp =

Common-law wife of Wyatt Earp (1861–1944)

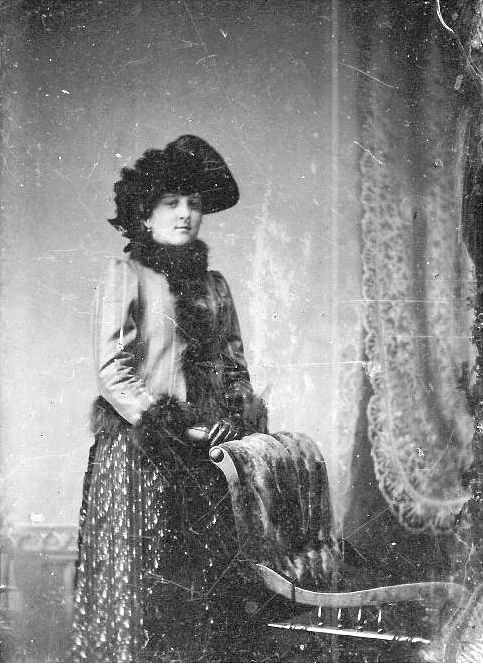
- Generally accepted to be a picture of Earp in Prescott, Arizona Territory, in 1880.
- Born: Josephine Sarah Marcus; 1861; New York City, U.S.
- Died: December 19, 1944 (aged 82–83); Los Angeles, California, U.S.
- Resting place: Hills of Eternity Memorial Park, Colma, California; 37°40′33″N 122°27′12″W
- Other names: Sadie, Josie; Josephine Behan; possibly Sadie Mansfield
- Occupations: frontier adventurer; gambler; possibly prostitute
- Spouses: Johnny Behan (common-law husband); Wyatt Earp (common-law husband)

Josephine Sarah "Sadie" Earp (née Marcus; 1861 – December 19, 1944) was the common-law wife of Wyatt Earp, a famed Old West lawman and gambler. She met Wyatt in 1881 in the frontier boom town of Tombstone in Arizona Territory, when she was living with Johnny Behan, sheriff of Cochise County, Arizona.

Josephine was born in New York to a Prussian Jewish family. Her father was a baker. They moved to San Francisco, where Josephine attended dance school as a girl. When her father had difficulty finding work, the family moved in with her older sister and brother-in-law in a working-class tenement. Josephine ran away, possibly as early as age 14, and traveled to Arizona, where she said she went "looking for adventure". Much of her life from about 1874 to 1882 (when she lived in the Arizona Territory) is uncertain; she worked hard to keep this period of her life private, even threatening legal action against writers and movie producers. She may have arrived in Prescott, Arizona, as early as 1874. The book I Married Wyatt Earp (1967), based on a manuscript allegedly written in part by her, describes events she witnessed in Arizona that occurred before 1879, the year she claimed at other times to have first arrived in Tombstone. There is some evidence that she lived from 1874 to 1876 in Prescott and Tip Top, Arizona Territory under the assumed name of Sadie Mansfield, who was a prostitute, before becoming ill and returning to San Francisco. The name Sadie Mansfield was also recorded in Tombstone. Researchers have found that the two names share extremely similar characteristics and circumstances.

Later in life Josephine described her first years in Arizona as "a bad dream". What is known for certain is that she traveled to Tombstone using the name Josephine Marcus in October 1880. She wrote that she met Cochise County Sheriff Johnny Behan when she was 17 and he was 33. He promised to marry her and she joined him in Tombstone. He reneged but persuaded her to stay. Behan was sympathetic to ranchers and certain outlaw Cowboys, who were at odds with Deputy U.S. Marshal Virgil Earp and his brothers, Wyatt and Morgan. Josephine left Behan in 1881, before the gunfight at the O.K. Corral, during which Wyatt and his brothers killed three Cochise County Cowboys. She went to San Francisco in March 1882 and was joined that fall by Wyatt, with whom she remained as his life companion for 46 years until his death.

Josephine and Wyatt moved throughout their life, from one boomtown to another, until they finally bought a cottage in the Sonoran Desert town of Vidal, California, on the Colorado River, where they spent the cooler seasons. In the summer they retreated to Los Angeles, where Wyatt struck up relationships with some of the early cowboy actors, including William S. Hart and Tom Mix. The facts about Josephine Earp and her relationship to Wyatt were relatively unknown until amateur Earp historian Glenn Boyer published the book I Married Wyatt Earp. Boyer's book was considered a factual memoir, and cited by scholars, studied in classrooms, and used as a source by filmmakers for 32 years. In 1998, reporters and scholars found that Boyer could not document many of the facts he wrote about Josephine's time in Tombstone. Some critics decried the book as a fraud and a hoax, and the University of Arizona withdrew the book from its catalog.

== Early life ==
Josephine Sarah Marcus was born in 1861 in New York City, the second of three children of immigrants Carl-Hyman Marcuse (later Henry Marcus) and Sophie Lewis. The Lewis family was Jewish, and came from the Posen region in Prussia, current-day Poland, around 1850. Sophie was a widow with a 3-year-old daughter, Rebecca Levy, when she married Marcuse, who was eight years younger than she. Sophie and Carl had three children together: Nathan (born 1857), Josephine, and Henrietta (born 1864).

=== Move to San Francisco ===
Josephine's father Henry was a baker. He struggled to make a living in New York City and read about the growing city of San Francisco. Henry moved the family there in 1868 when Josephine was seven. They traveled via ship to Panama, went over the Isthmus of Panama, and caught a steamship to San Francisco. They arrived while the city was recovering from the disastrous earthquake of October 21, 1868. Upon their arrival, her father found a highly stratified Jewish community. On the inside were the German Jews and on the outside were the Polish Jews. The German Jews were usually more affluent, better educated, and spoke German, while the Polish Jews, who spoke Yiddish, were typically peddlers and much more religious. Henry found work as a baker.

By 1870, San Francisco was riding on the coattails of the still-expanding economic boom caused by the mining of silver from the Comstock Lode. The population had boomed to 149,473, and housing was in short supply. Apartment buildings were crowded, and large homes were converted into rooming houses. Money flowed from Nevada through San Francisco, and for a while the Marcus family prospered. Later that year, Josephine's half-sister Rebecca Levy married Aaron Wiener, an insurance salesman born in Prussia, as her parents were.

=== Living conditions ===
As an adult, Josephine claimed her father was German and ran a prosperous mercantile business. Henry Marcus initially made enough money to send Josephine and her sister Hattie to music and dance classes at McCarty's Dancing Academy, a family-owned business on Eddy St. that taught both children and adults. In I Married Wyatt Earp, author Glen Boyer states that Josephine took dance lessons and had a maid. He wrote (in her voice), "Hattie and I attended the McCarthy Dancing Academy for children on Howard Street (Polk and Pacific). Eugenia and Lottie McCarthy taught us to dance the Highland Fling, the Sailor's Hornpipe, and ballroom dancing."

During 1874, when Josephine was 13, production of gold and silver from the Comstock Lode had fed a feverish stock market, leading to a great deal of speculation. When the Comstock Lode production began to fade, San Francisco suffered. Her father Henry’s earnings as a baker fell. The family was forced to move in with Josephine's older sister Rebecca and her husband Aaron "south of the slot" (south of Market Street) at 138 Perry Street between 3rd and 2nd at Harrison in a tenement on the flatlands. It was a working-class, ethnically mixed neighborhood, where smoke from factory chimneys filled the air. The 1880 census places the family in the 9th Ward, between San Francisco Bay, Channel, Harrison and Seventh streets. In early 1880, Henry was living with his son-in-law Aaron, who was employed as a bookkeeper.

=== Youth ===
As a girl, Josephine loved going to the theater. "There was far too much excitement in the air to remain a child." She apparently resented treatment by her teachers in the San Francisco schools, describing them as "inconsistent of a tolerant and gay populous acting as merciless and self-righteous as a New England village in bringing up its children." She described the harsh discipline meted out, including the "sting of rattan" and "being slapped for tardiness". Josephine said that she matured early and developed large breasts.

== Mixing fact and fiction ==
Throughout her later life, Josephine worked hard to manage what the press and public knew about her and Wyatt's life in Arizona. Josephine told Earp's biographers and others that Earp did not drink, never owned gambling saloons, and that his saloons did not offer prostitutes, which all have been documented. When Frank Waters was writing Tombstone Travesty, originally published in 1934, he returned from a research trip to Tombstone to learn that Josephine Earp had visited his mother and sister and threatened court action to prevent him from publishing the book. Waters' work was later found to be critically flawed, "based upon prevarications, character assassinations, and the psychological battleground that was the brilliant, narcissistic mind of its author."

In the course of writing Wyatt Earp: Frontier Marshal (1931), Stuart Lake learned that Josephine had lived with Johnny Behan in Tombstone and other aspects of Josephine's life that she wanted to keep private. Josephine and Wyatt went to great lengths to keep her name out of Lake's book, and she threatened litigation to keep it that way. At one point in their contentious relationship, Josephine described Lake's book as made up of "outright lies". After Wyatt died in 1929, Josephine traveled to Boston, Massachusetts, to try to persuade the publisher to stop the release of the book. Although the biography became a bestseller, it was later strongly criticized for fictionalizing Earp's life and was found to be markedly inaccurate.

During the later years of her life, in addition to burnishing the life and legend of husband Wyatt Earp, "she scripted a history of make believe to hide a number of things of which she was not terribly proud."

=== Concealed Wyatt's former wife ===
As late as 1936, Josephine took legal action to suppress certain details of her and Wyatt's life in Tombstone. Josephine worked hard to conceal Wyatt's prior relationship to his common-law wife and former prostitute Mattie Blaylock, with whom Wyatt was living when Josephine first met him in 1880. Earp named a mining claim he filed on February 16, 1880 "Mattie Blaylock." While Blaylock was living with Earp, she suffered from severe headaches and became addicted to laudanum, an opiate-based pain reliever widely available at the time. After Earp left Tombstone and Blaylock, she waited in Colton, California, to hear from him, but he never contacted her. She met a gambler from Arizona who asked her to marry him. She asked Wyatt for a divorce, but Wyatt did not believe in divorce and refused. She ran away with the gambler anyway, who later abandoned her in Arizona. Mattie resumed life as a prostitute and committed "suicide by opium poisoning" on July 3, 1888.

=== Evasive about Tombstone history ===
The facts about Josephine's life in the Arizona Territory and in Tombstone have been obscured by her legal and personal efforts to keep that period private. Josephine's own story offers a conflicting account of when she first reached Arizona. Her confusing recollection of events show how easily Josephine mixed fact and fiction.

After Wyatt's death, Josephine collaborated with two of her husband's cousins, Mabel Earp Cason and her sister Vinolia Earp Ackerman, to document her life. The cousins recorded events in her later life, but they found Josephine evasive about the timing and nature of events during her time in the Arizona Territory and Tombstone. She would not even talk about the key events of 1881–82, their key years in Tombstone. The most she would say is that she returned to the Arizona Territory in 1881 and joined Johnny Behan in Tombstone. She said that she had believed Behan was planning to marry her, but he kept putting it off, and she grew disillusioned.

Based on the story she told the Earp cousins, when correlated with other sources, Josephine may have left her parents’ home in San Francisco for Prescott, Arizona, as early as October 1874, when she was 13 or 14 years old, not 1879 as she related later. Cason says she and her sister "finally abandoned work on the manuscript because she [Josie] would not clear up the Tombstone sequence where it pertained to her and Wyatt."

=== Hidden personal past ===
In addition to Josephine's concealing Wyatt's past relationship with Blaylock, modern researchers think she may also have been concealing her own past as a "sporting lady" or prostitute. When Stuart Lake was researching his book Wyatt Earp: Frontier Marshal he heard stories about Sadie's personal history. He did not include them in the book, but he did write about them in letters during 1929. Bat Masterson, a friend of Wyatt Earp's who was in Tombstone from February to April 1881, described her to Stuart Lake as "an incredible beauty" and as the "belle of the honkytonks, the prettiest dame in three hundred or so of her kind." Honkytonk bars in that era often had a reputation as places for prostitution and his choice of language ("three hundred or so of her kind") may have referred to Josephine's work as a prostitute.

Other researchers have questioned what she did prior to 1883. A town like Tombstone, full of single men, attracted women who sought adventure with little concern for what others might think. Josephine always sought excitement in her life. In the book I Married Wyatt Earp (1967), based on a manuscript which she purportedly wrote, author Glenn Boyer quotes her as saying, "I liked the traveling sort of man... better than the kind that sat back in one town all his life and wrote down little rows of figures all day or hustled dry goods or groceries and that sort of thing... My blood demanded excitement, variety and change."

Men in Tombstone outnumbered women nine to one, and the miners were eager to pay substantial fees to women who would cook their meals, provide rooms, wash their clothes, and provide sexual services. Many madams and prostitutes had more control of their lives and greater independence than "respectable" women, who often ostracized them. Married women of the era were expected to avoid working outside the home, or risk being considered "public women," a euphemism for prostitute. A few women of the era chose to remain single as a means to maintain their independence from men, and Josephine was among them.

The type of work available to unmarried women without means in that era was as waitresses, laundresses, seamstresses, or other work which Josephine avoided. Some women in Tombstone operated restaurants, boarding houses, and apparel and millinery shops, and a few ran some of the dry goods stores. Many wives of the prosperous mining engineers, merchants, and business owners lived in better class cities where they did not have to contend with being confused for a prostitute.

Josephine's life on the frontier and possibly as a prostitute allowed her greater independence. She likely enjoyed the social life and independence that accompanied her role. As an unmarried woman in frontier Tombstone, vastly outnumbered by men, she was likely regarded by some as a prostitute, regardless of her true status.

== Runaway ==
In a remarkable set of coincidences, the known life of Josephine Sadie Marcus overlapped the life of an otherwise unknown prostitute named Sadie Mansfield. Josie attended the Powell Street Primary School on Powell St. between Clay and Washington in San Francisco. One block away on the 1000 block of Clay Street in a neighborhood known for prostitution was a brothel, owned by Hattie Wells. In 1879, five prostitutes lived there. Josephine had to walk past the brothel every day on her way to school. To her the women appeared not as "soiled doves" but nicely dressed women living a life of leisure. Wells also owned a brothel in Prescott, Arizona.

In I Married Wyatt Earp, Josephine wrote that one day, "I left my home one morning, carrying my books just as though I was going to school as usual." She said that at the age of 18, she ran away with two friends, Dora Hirsch, daughter of her music teacher, and a girl named Agnes, who had a role in Pauline Markham troupe's production of H.M.S. Pinafore in San Francisco. Author Sherry Monahan questions why an 18-year-old woman would be carrying books to school and find it necessary to "run away."

=== First arrival in Arizona ===
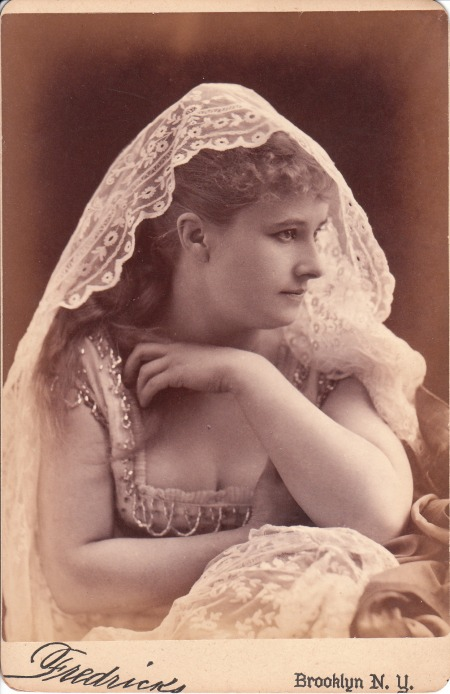
Pauline Markham, c. 1860s. Josephine said she joined Markham's theater troupe in 1879 in San Francisco before it toured to Arizona, but no record of Josephine or Sadie Marcus as a member of the group has been found.

In the Cason manuscript, which was in part the basis for the book I Married Wyatt Earp, Josephine says she and her friend Dora joined the Pauline Markham Theater Company in 1879, when it visited San Francisco on its Western tour. Markham already had a national reputation as a burlesque dancer and singer. She often appeared on stage and in publicity photos wearing a corset and pink tights: shocking attire for the 1870s. Josephine wrote that Dora was hired as a singer, and she was hired as a dancer. Josie said the two of them sailed with the other six members of the Pauline Markham troupe from San Francisco to Santa Barbara, where they stayed for a few days, performing in San Bernardino before leaving for Prescott, Arizona Territory, by stagecoach.

Josephine said the girls arrived with the troupe in Tombstone on December 1, 1879, for a one-week engagement. This was the same date that Wyatt Earp and his brothers arrived. After a week in Tombstone, the Markham troupe finished their engagement and headed north to Prescott. They performed H.M.S. Pinafore more than a dozen times from December 24, 1879, through February 20, 1880. Josephine said she left the acting troupe in February 1880, just after the Markham troupe ended its initial run of performances in Prescott.

Author Roger Ray thoroughly researched Josephine's story about joining the theater company and found many inconsistencies. The Markham troupe is documented as leaving San Francisco on board the Southern Pacific Railroad, not a ship nor a stagecoach, in October 1879 for Casa Grande, Arizona, the end of the line. Josephine or Sadie Marcus’s name was never included among those on the Markham troupe’s rolls in 1879. The Yuma Arizona Sentinel reported on October 25, 1879, "Tuesday arrived a Pinafore Company for Tucson, composed of Misses Pauline Markham, Mary Bell, Belle Howard, and Mrs. Pring, and Messrs. Borabeck and McMahon." From Yuma, the troupe took a stagecoach to Tucson, not Prescott. Ray says that Josephine didn't have a friend named Dora Hirsch. Her real name was Leah Hirschberg, whose mother was a music teacher. This family lived only a few blocks from where Josephine lived with her family. But Leah never left San Francisco with Josephine. She enjoyed some brief success as a juvenile actress on the San Francisco stage during the 1870s.

Professor Pat Ryan stated that Josephine or Sadie may have used the stage name May Bell as a member of the Markham stage group. On October 21, 1879, the Los Angeles Herald reported that May Bell was among members of the Markham troupe. But, no other corroborating evidence has been found supporting the thesis that Josephine used May Bell as a stage name, and she never claimed so.

=== Links to prostitute Sadie Mansfield ===
Josephine began using the name Sadie after she arrived in Arizona. Sadie was a well-known nickname for Sarah, Josie's middle name, and it was common for prostitutes of that time period to change their first name. In November 1874, a woman named Sadie Mansfield took a stagecoach from San Francisco to Prescott along with several prostitutes working for Madame Hattie Wells. The group included a black woman named Julia Barton. (Josephine in her own account said that she brought her maid, a black woman named Julia, with her. She also told the Earp cousins that Pauline Markham had a maid named Julia.) On October 20, 1875, the Arizona Weekly Miner of Prescott, Arizona, noted that among the passengers en route from San Francisco were "Miss Saddie [sic] Mansfield... and Mrs. Julia Barton, a servant." Prostitution wasn't illegal in the territory as long as the women paid their licensing fees. Prominent men were, however, expected to be discreet.

=== Johnny Behan ===
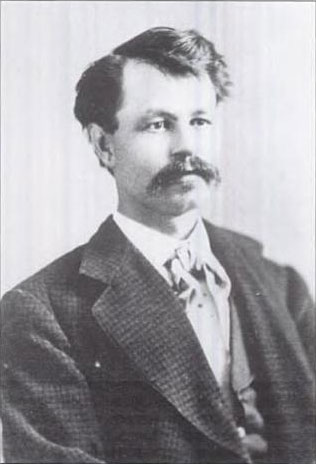
Johnny Behan in 1871. Josephine said he was "young and darkly handsome, with merry black eyes and an engaging smile."

Josephine told others that when she and her friend Dora arrived in Arizona she learned that "some renegade Yuma-Apaches had escaped from the reservation to which they had been consigned and had returned to their old haunts on the war-path." She wrote that the famous Indian fighter Al Sieber was tracking the escaped Apache. She said that Sieber and his scouts led her stagecoach and its passengers to a nearby adobe ranch house. The group spent 10 days sleeping on the floor. Josephine first met John "Johnny" Harris Behan at the ranch house, whom she described as, "young and darkly handsome, with merry black eyes and an engaging smile. My heart was stirred by his attentions in what were very romantic circumstances. It was a diversion from my homesickness though I cannot say I was in love with him.... I am under the impression that he was a deputy sheriff engaged on some official errand." If as Josephine stated she traveled with Markham's troupe from San Francisco in December 1879, there are no contemporary accounts of the trip's being interrupted by Indians.

Behan married 17-year-old Victoria Zaff in March 1869 in San Francisco, her step-father's home town. She was the step-daughter of Yavapai County Sheriff John P. Bourke. The couple moved back to Prescott, Arizona Territory, where John had been working, and four months later, on June 15, 1869, she had her first child, Henrietta. Behan was on the surface an upstanding citizen, married with a child, but he also frequented brothels.

During 1871–73, Behan succeeded his father-in-law Bourke as Yavapai County Sheriff. On September 28, 1874, Behan was nominated at the Democratic convention to stand for re-election. He began campaigning and the Prescott Miner reported on October 6, 1874, that "J.H. Behan left on an 'electioneering' tour toward Black Canyon, Wickenburg and other places" north and west of present-day Phoenix.

Later that same month, on October 24, 1874, the Arizona Miner reported, "Al Zieber, Sergeant Stauffer and a mixed command of white and red soldiers are in the hills of Verde looking for some erring Apaches, whom they will be apt to find." Three days later, Sieber and Sgt. Rudolph Stauffer found the Apaches that had escaped the reservation at Cave Creek and fought them. The area in which Behan campaigned was also near Cave Creek, where Al Sieber was looking for Indians. Behan was gone for 35 days, returning to Prescott on November 11, 1874, where he lost the election.

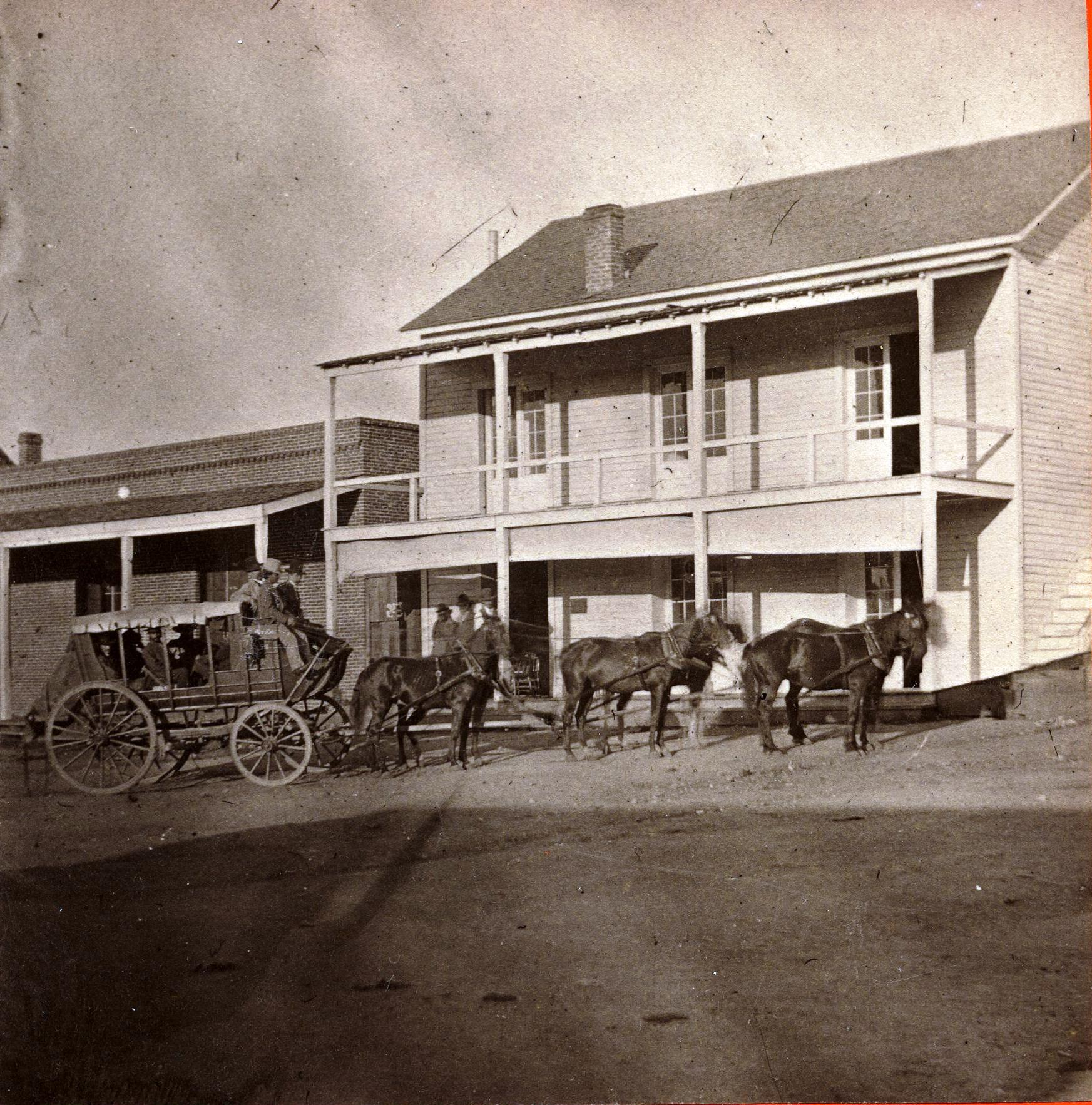
The first Yavapai County Courthouse and Jail, a wood frame structure, was on North Cortez Street in Prescott.

The events that Josephine "Sadie" Marcus claimed took place when she was 18 years old in 1879 don't correlate with known facts, but do closely correspond to the events in 14-year-old Sadie Mansfield's journey to Prescott in 1874.

=== Sadie Mansfield in Arizona ===
Prescott had 668 residents in 1870. In 1874, 14-year-old Sadie Mansfield worked under the watchful eye of Madam Josie Roland as a prostitute in a brothel on Granite Street, between Gurley and Alarcon streets, and near the Yavapai County Courthouse where Sheriff Behan worked. Neighbors in Prescott witnessed Behan visiting the "house of ill fame" on Granite Street on several occasions during December 1874. He had a "relationship with" Sadie Mansfield, likely the same girl who had traveled with Hattie Wells' prostitutes from San Francisco.

On February 6, 1875, criminal charges were filed against Sadie Mansfield for petty larceny, accusing her of stealing two German silver spoons worth $126.00. The charges against her reported that "one set of German table spoons were stolen from the store of H. Asher and Company in the village of Prescott, Yavapai, A.T." Sheriff Ed Burnes searched Mansfield's residence and confiscated the spoons. The case was tried the same day with only one witness for the defense, Jennie Andrews. The nine-man jury found her not guilty. The Weekly Arizona Miner of Prescott reported on February 5, 1875, that Sadie Mansfield won a prize in the "Grand New Year Gift Enterprise". The paper also reported on April 9, 1875, that a letter was waiting for her in the post office.

On May 22, 1875, Behan's wife Victoria filed for divorce. She took the unusual step of asserting in her divorce petition that Behan "at divers times and places openly and notoriously visited houses of ill-fame and prostitution at said town of Prescott." Victoria cited liaisons with several woman, but specifically mentioned a "Sadie or Sada Mansfield", a 14-year-old "woman of prostitution and ill-fame" as co-respondent in the divorce action. The divorce also cited Behan's threats of violence and unrelenting verbal abuse. Behan claimed their daughter Henrietta wasn't his, and a request for support for Henrietta was stricken from the divorce petition.

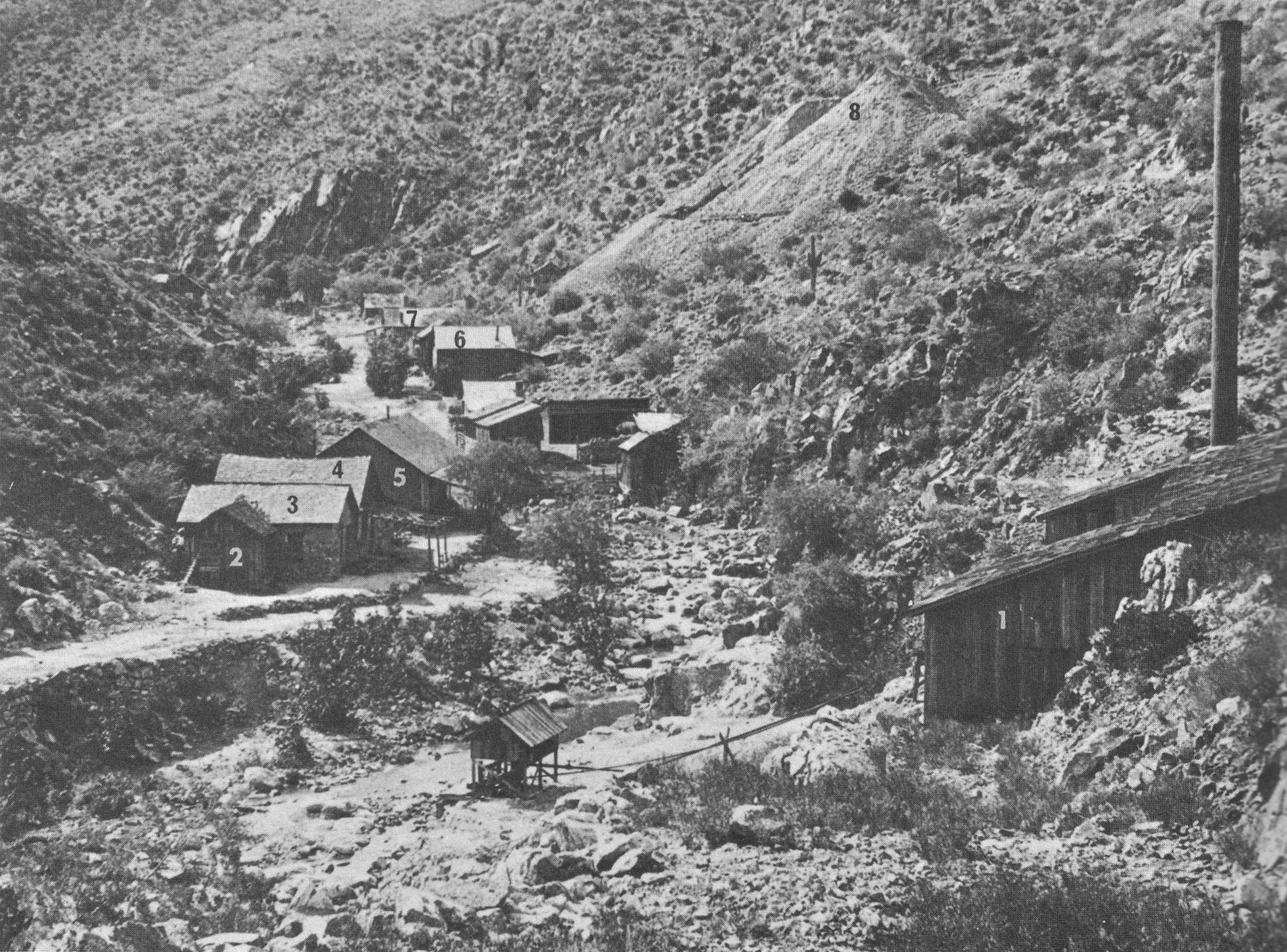
Tip Top, Arizona Territory, circa 1888

Behan and his wife were divorced in less than a month, in June 1875. Behan moved for a time to the northwest Arizona Territory, where he served as the Mohave County Recorder in 1877. He lost an election for Mohave County deputy sheriff in Gillet in 1879, but was elected as Mohave's representative to the Tenth Territorial Legislature. In the summer of 1879 he moved back to Prescott, the territorial capital. He opened a small business catering to miners and joined a few posses pursuing bandits. The Weekly Journal-Miner reported in October 1879 that Behan was planning on opening a business in the silver mining boom town of Tip Top in central Arizona. In November 1879, Johnny Behan opened his new saloon for business. While the town already had five saloons with five courtesans, Johnny's new saloon had none.

During the 1880 census in Tip Top, Behan's occupation was given as saloon keeper. Nineteen-year-old Sadie Mansfield, the same person his former wife Victoria had named in their divorce five years earlier, was also living in Tip Top. Her occupation was "Courtesan".

In retelling her life story, Josephine Marcus retold many elements of her experience that corroborated facts in Sadie Mansfield's history. These facts may explain why Josephine later thought of this time in her life as "a bad dream." She said, "the whole experience recurs to my memory as a bad dream and I remember little of its details. I can remember shedding many tears in out-of the way-corners. I thought constantly of my mother and how great must be her grief and worry over me. In my confusion, I could see no way out of the tragic mess."

=== San Francisco ===
In her Cason manuscript, Josephine or Sadie wrote that she and Dora were homesick and returned to San Francisco with Sieber's help. If Sieber helped her, the only time period that fits Josephine's story is when Sieber was in the Prescott area at Camp Verde from 1873 to 1875. Josephine said that Sieber, who was German and may have recognized Josephine's German accent, guessed her situation and sent a telegram from Fort Whipple to her brother-in-law Aaron Weiner. She said Weiner used a connection he had in Prescott to help Josephine get home. In January 1876, Josephine or Sadie left Prescott, stopped at a Los Angeles hotel, and returned to San Francisco before March 6.

Josephine told the Earp cousins that she returned to San Francisco before the grand opening of Lucky Baldwin's luxury Baldwin Hotel and Theater on the northeast corner of Powell and Market St., which opened on March 6, 1876. The opening date of the Baldwin Hotel is much earlier than the date Josephine said she left for Arizona with the Pauline Markham Troupe in 1879.

Josephine wrote much later that her family wanted to keep her "escapades from the public." In her memoirs she wrote, "the younger children (niece and nephew), and our friends were told that I had gone away for a visit. Mrs. Hirsch, because of Dora’s part in it was as anxious as my people (family), to keep it a secret. The memory of it has been a source of humiliation and regret to me in all the years since that time and I have never until now disclosed it to anyone besides my husband (Wyatt)." She added, "The fear and the excitement, the weeks of exhausting travel, chagrin over my own foolishness, all together proved too much for my strength. I developed St. Vitus Dance and was unable to attend school very much again. After a time however I very much improved in health so that within two years after my experience I was once more a normal healthy girl." If Josephine, as she said, left San Francisco at age 18, it's unclear why she would still be attending school upon her return two years later. Like cerebral meningitis, St. Vitus Dance is a form of a streptococcus infection. The symptoms of St. Vitus Dance and meningitis are somewhat different, but both can be contracted from the same strain of bacteria through saliva. Both of Behan's children, Henrietta and Albert, were ill with meningitis around 1877, and in July of that year, Henrietta died from the disease.

=== Behan proposes ===
In February or March 1879: The Prescott Weekly Journal-Miner reported that John Behan was visiting San Francisco. Josephine said Behan asked her to marry him and persuaded her parents to approve their engagement. She said Behan told her family that he could not leave his livery stable business long enough for a wedding in San Francisco. Some modern researchers question the likelihood that her father, a Reform Jew, would approve his daughter's union with Behan, a man 14 years older than his daughter, an unemployed office-seeker, Gentile, and divorced father. Later in life, Josephine was not a practicing Jew and did not seem to care whether her partners were Jewish.

Josephine thought Johnny’s marriage proposal was a good excuse to leave home again. She wrote, "life was dull for me in San Francisco. In spite of my bad experience of a few years ago the call to adventure still stirred my blood." Considering that Josephine reported in later life at having first arrived with the Markham Troupe on December 1, 1879, and that Josephine joined Behan in Tombstone that same year, her reference to "my bad experience of a few years ago" means she must have been in Arizona for some time before 1879.

=== Sadie in Arizona and San Francisco ===
Sadie Mansfield left Gillete, near Tip Top, and arrived in Phoenix on February 13, 1880. During the same week, Behan registered at the Bank Exchange Hotel in Phoenix, and on March 5 the Prescott Weekly Journal-Miner reported that Sadie had returned to Gillette from Phoenix on March 2.

On June 2, 1880, the U.S. census had recorded Sadie Mansfield, whose occupation was "courtesan", as living in Tip Top. On June 1 or 2, 1880, William V. Carroll, the census enumerator for the 9th ward in San Francisco, visited the Marcus home. He lived about two blocks from the family, so he likely already knew the family. He recorded Josephine as a member of the Marcus household, information that may have been offered by her parents. But Josephine said that her parents hid her activities, and they may have been covering for her when the census taker appeared on their doorstep. In a set of extraordinary coincidences, Sadie Mansfield and Sadie Marcus had very similar names and initials and were known by their friends as "Sadie." Both made a stagecoach journey from San Francisco to Prescott, Arizona Territory; both traveled with a black woman named Julia; both were sexual partners with Behan; both were 19 years old, born in New York City, and had parents from Germany. The only difference noted in the 1880 census is their occupation: Sadie in San Francisco is listed as "At home", while Sadie in Tip Top is recorded as a "Courtesan". (In the 1920 census, Sadie reported to the census taker that her family was from Hamburg, Germany, bordering Prussia.)

== Move to Tombstone ==
In September 1880, Behan and Sadie left Tip Top for Tombstone. Soon after they arrived, Behan's ex-wife sent their eight-year-old son Albert to live with him. In reconstructing her life story, Josephine said years later that she actually lived with Kitty Jones and her husband, a lawyer, while working as a housekeeper for Behan. Boyer and other modern researchers argue that she actually lived with Behan. In Josephine's version of her life story, she left San Francisco to join Behan to Tombstone in October 1880, and was hoping he would fulfill his promises to marry her. When he delayed, she was ready to leave him.

Josephine is quoted in I Married Wyatt Earp that she received a letter and $300 from her father, urging her to return to San Francisco. The money was to cover her return trip, and it was ten times what she needed for the fare, and there is no record of him having sent the money to her. Rather than leave Tombstone, Josephine later wrote that Behan convinced her to use the money to build a house for them and continued their relationship. At the time, her parents, her sister Henrietta, and her brother Nathan were all living in a lower-class neighborhood south of Market Street in San Francisco with their daughter, her husband, their four children, and a boarder. Her father worked as a baker. It is unlikely that he was a "wealthy German merchant" as she described him.

While there are no records that her father sent her money, researchers have located records of money orders totaling $50 sent by Josephine to her family in San Francisco. One of these was sent after she ended her relationship with Johnny Behan, indicating that she was earning money as a single woman.

=== Kicks Behan out ===
In early 1881, Josephine returned to Tombstone after a trip to San Francisco. One version of the story is that she had taken Behan's son Albert, who was hearing impaired, to San Francisco for treatment. Upon their return, they arrived late in the evening and a day earlier than expected, at the house built with her father's money. Finding Behan in bed with the wife of a friend of theirs, she kicked him out.

=== Early relationship with Wyatt Earp ===
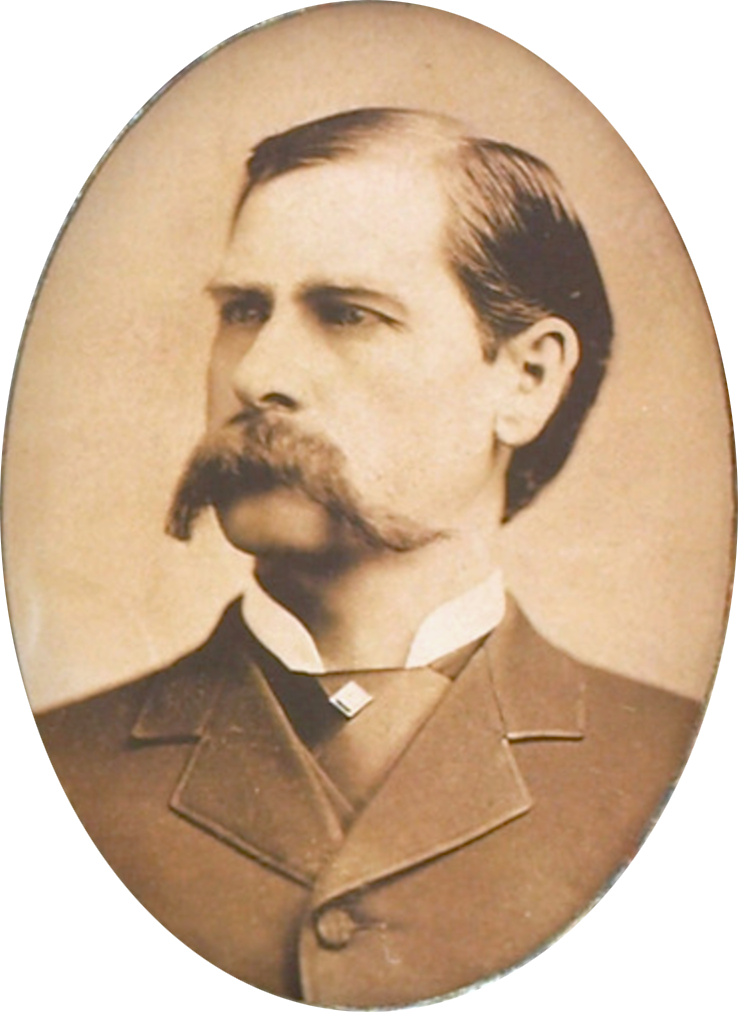
Wyatt Earp at about age 39.

How and when she and Wyatt Earp began their relationship is unknown. Tombstone diarist George W. Parsons never mentioned seeing Wyatt and Josephine together and neither did John Clum in his memoirs. While there are no contemporary records in Tombstone of a relationship between them, they certainly knew each other, as Behan and Earp both had offices above the Crystal Palace Saloon.

In his book, The Tombstone Travesty (later republished as The Earp Brothers of Tombstone), Frank Waters quotes Virgil Earp's wife, Allie, as saying that "Sadie's charms were undeniable. She had a small, trim body and a meneo of the hips that kept her full, flounced skirts bouncing. Sadie was an attractive woman, with thick, dark hair, vivid black eyes, and was well-endowed.

Some modern writers believe that Wyatt Earp moved in with Josephine after she kicked Behan out. But, in April 1881, less than eight months after Behan and Sadie built the house, she rented it to Dr. George Emory Goodfellow. At some point during August and September, Sadie and Wyatt may have become friends and perhaps more seriously involved. Writer Alan Barra suggests that Behan and Earp knew of their mutual attraction to the same woman before the Gunfight at the O.K. Corral, which may have contributed to their animosity. Author Stuart Lake wrote in a letter that "Johnny Behan's girl" was “the key to the whole yarn of Tombstone”.

A letter written by former New Mexico Territory Governor Miguel Otero appears to indicate that Earp had strong feelings for Josephine shortly after leaving Tombstone in April 1882. Following the Earp Vendetta Ride, the Earp posse went to Albuquerque, New Mexico for two weeks. While there, Wyatt stayed with prominent businessman Henry N. Jaffa, who was also president of New Albuquerque’s Board of Trade. Jaffa was also Jewish.

Wyatt and Holliday had been fast friends since Holliday saved Earp's life in Dodge City during 1878. During their stay in Albuquerque, the two men ate at The Retreat Restaurant owned by "Fat Charlie". Otero wrote in his letter, "Holiday said something about Earp becoming 'a damn Jew-boy.' Earp became angry and left…. [Henry] Jaffa told me later that Earp’s woman was a Jewess. Earp did mezuzah when entering the house." Earp's anger at Holliday's ethnic slur may indicate that his feelings for Josephine was more serious at the time than is commonly known. The information in the letter is compelling because at the time it was written in the 1940s, the relationship between Wyatt Earp and Josephine Marcus while living in Tombstone was virtually unknown. The only way Otero could write about these things was if he had a personal relationship with some of the individuals involved. The Earp party split up in Albuquerque, and Holliday and Dan Tipton rode on to Pueblo, while the rest of the group headed for Gunnison.

=== Names used in Tombstone ===
In June 1881, Sadie sent a postal money order to her mother using the name Josephine Behan, and Wyatt Earp was still living with his common-law wife Mattie Blaylock. The next month, in July 1881, Josephine Behan was reported to be leaving Tombstone by stage. But in August a Tombstone newspaper reported a letter waiting at the post office for Sadie Mansfield. Sadie was apparently no longer claiming to be Behan's wife.

=== Presence after gunfight ===
Josephine is quoted in I Married Wyatt Earp as saying that on October 26, 1881, the day of the shootout at the O.K. Corral, she was at her home when she heard the sound of gunfire. Running into town in the direction of the shots, Josephine was relieved to see that Wyatt was uninjured. Other researchers and writers aren't even sure she was in town that day. No contemporary accounts place her at the scene of the gunfight afterward.

After the Gunfight at the O.K. Corral, Ike Clanton filed murder charges against the Earps and Doc Holliday. During a month-long preliminary hearing, Judge Wells Spicer heard testimony from a large number of witnesses. The Tombstone Epitaph reported on November 11, 1881, that "S. Mansfield" from San Francisco had passed Colton, California (where Wyatt Earp's parents lived) en route to Arizona, a few days before Wyatt's testimony at the Spicer hearing.

=== Leaves Tombstone ===
During the next few months, until April 1882, Sadie Mansfield is recorded in various newspapers as traveling back and forth between Tombstone and San Francisco several times. The Epitaph reported on February 27, 1882, that S. Mansfield of Tombstone was returning from the west with other passengers, passing through Colton, California. In March 1882, Sadie sent a postal money order to her mother, Mrs. H. Marcus, in San Francisco. She didn't use either Marcus or Behan as her name, but asked a friend to send the postal order for her.

Sadie, traveling as either Mrs. J. C. Earp or Mrs. Wyatt Earp, left Tombstone for her family in San Francisco via Los Angeles on March 24, 1882. This was one week after Morgan Earp was assassinated and five days after Wyatt set out in pursuit of those he believed responsible.

After the Earp Vendetta Ride ended in April 1882, Wyatt left Arizona for Colorado. Earp's former wife, Mattie Blaylock traveled with other Earp family members in April 1882, to Colton, California, waiting for Wyatt to telegraph her and invite her to join him. Wyatt never sent for her and she moved to Pinal, Arizona, where she resumed life as a prostitute, eventually committing suicide by taking an overdose of laudanum. Sadie Mansfield reappeared in Tombstone when she was noted in the July 1882 Tombstone census, but Josephine Marcus and Josephine Behan were not. Sadie and John Behan lived at different addresses.

== Life after Tombstone ==
Josephine's life after Tombstone and with Wyatt Earp is not well known, although it isn't as obscured by stories of her life in Tombstone that she told to hide facts. The San Diego Union printed a report from the San Francisco Call on July 9, 1882, that Virgil Earp was in San Francisco (receiving treatment for his shattered arm) and that Wyatt was expected to arrive there that day. Following Wyatt's return to San Francisco, Josephine began using the name of "Josephine Earp". Wyatt took a job managing a horse stable in Santa Rosa. Earp developed a reputation as a sportsman as well as a gambler. He was reputed to own a six-horse stable in San Francisco, although it was learned later that the horses were leased. At Santa Rosa, Earp personally competed in and won a harness race. The Sacramento Daily Record reported on October 20, 1882, that Virgil had arrived in town from Tombstone to greet his brother Wyatt arriving from the east, although Virgil was living in Colton at the time.

=== Mining camps and boom towns ===
In early 1883, Josephine—or Sadie as Wyatt called her—and Wyatt left San Francisco for Gunnison, Colorado, where Earp ran a Faro bank until he received a request in April for assistance from Luke Short in Dodge City. In December 1883, they visited Galveston, Texas, and in March 1884 they were in Salt Lake City. Josephine and Wyatt traveled through various western states hunting for gold and silver mining they could invest in. In 1884, Wyatt and his wife Josie, his brothers Warren and James, and James' wife Bessie arrived in Eagle City, Idaho, another new boomtown that was created as a result of the discovery of gold, silver, and lead in the Coeur d'Alene area. (It's now a ghost town in Shoshone County). Wyatt followed the crowd looking for gold in the Murray-Eagle mining district and paid $2,250 for a 50 feet (15 m) diameter white circus, in which they opened a dance hall and saloon called The White Elephant.

After the Coeur d'Alene mining venture died out, Earp and Josie briefly went to El Paso, Texas before moving in 1887 to San Diego where the railroad was about to arrive and a real estate boom was underway. They stayed for about four years, living most of the time in the Brooklyn Hotel. Earp speculated in San Diego's booming real estate market. Between 1887 and around 1896 he bought four saloons and gambling halls, one on Fourth Street and two near Sixth and E, all in the "respectable" part of town.

The Earps moved back to San Francisco in 1891 so Josie could be closer to her family. Earp developed a reputation as a sportsman as well as a gambler. He held onto his San Diego properties but their value fell, but he could not pay the taxes and was forced to sell the lots. He continued to race horses, but by 1896 he could no longer afford to own horses, but raced them on behalf of the owner of a horse stable in Santa Rosa that he managed for her.

=== Marriage to Wyatt ===
Josephine wrote in I Married Wyatt Earp that she and Wyatt were married in 1892 offshore by the captain of Lucky Baldwin's yacht. Raymond Nez wrote that his grandparents witnessed their marriage off the California coast. No public record of their marriage has ever been found. Wyatt and Josie never had any children. Josie had two miscarriages during her life and was apparently unable to have children. She maintained a relationship with Johnny Behan's son, Albert Price Behan, whom she had grown to love as her own son. They moved frequently, even when living in the same town. From 1891 to 1896, the Earps lived in at least four different locations in San Francisco: 145 Ellis St., 720 McAllister St., 514A Seventh Ave. and 1004 Golden Gate Ave. After moving to southern California in about 1903, they also lived in several different locations.

According to many who knew them, their relationship was often stormy. Wyatt had a mischievous sense of humor. He knew his wife preferred the name "Josephine" and detested "Sadie", but early in their relationship he began calling her 'Sadie'. Josephine frequently griped about Wyatt’s lack of work and financial success and even his character and personality. Wyatt would often go on long walks to get away from her.

Each may have engaged in extramarital affairs. Josephine could be controlling. Grace Spolidora was a teenager during the Earp's many visits to her family's home near Needles, California, and sometimes went to San Diego with them. She attributed the highly exaggerated stories about Wyatt Earp to Josephine. Sadie "would always interfere whenever Wyatt would talk with Stuart Lake. She always interfered! She wanted him to look like a church-going saint and blow things up. Wyatt didn't want that at all!"

Among the facts Josephine wanted scrubbed from Earp's history, she persuaded biographers Flood, Lake and Burns to write that Earp was a non-drinker. Charlie Welsh, Grace Spolidora's father, was a good friend of Earp's. He was known to disappear for days at a time "to see property", the family euphemism for a drinking binge, and Earp was his regular partner. Director John Ford said that whenever Josephine left town for religious conventions, Earp would come into town, play poker, and get drunk with the cowboy actors.

=== Nevada to Alaska to Nevada ===
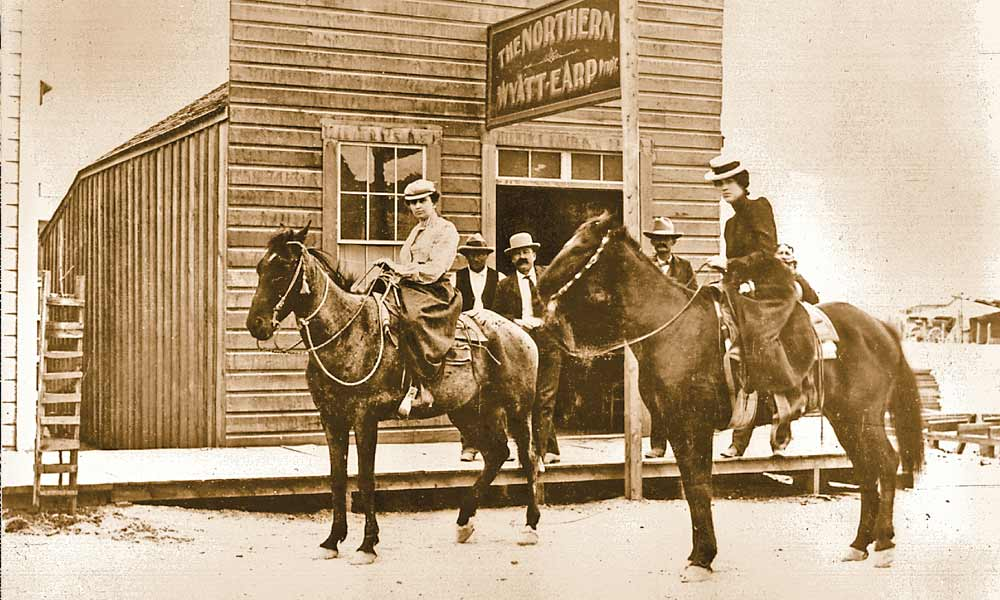
Wyatt Earp's Northern Saloon, Tonopah, Nevada, circa 1902. The man in the center is believed to be Wyatt Earp, and the woman on the left is often identified as Josephine Earp.

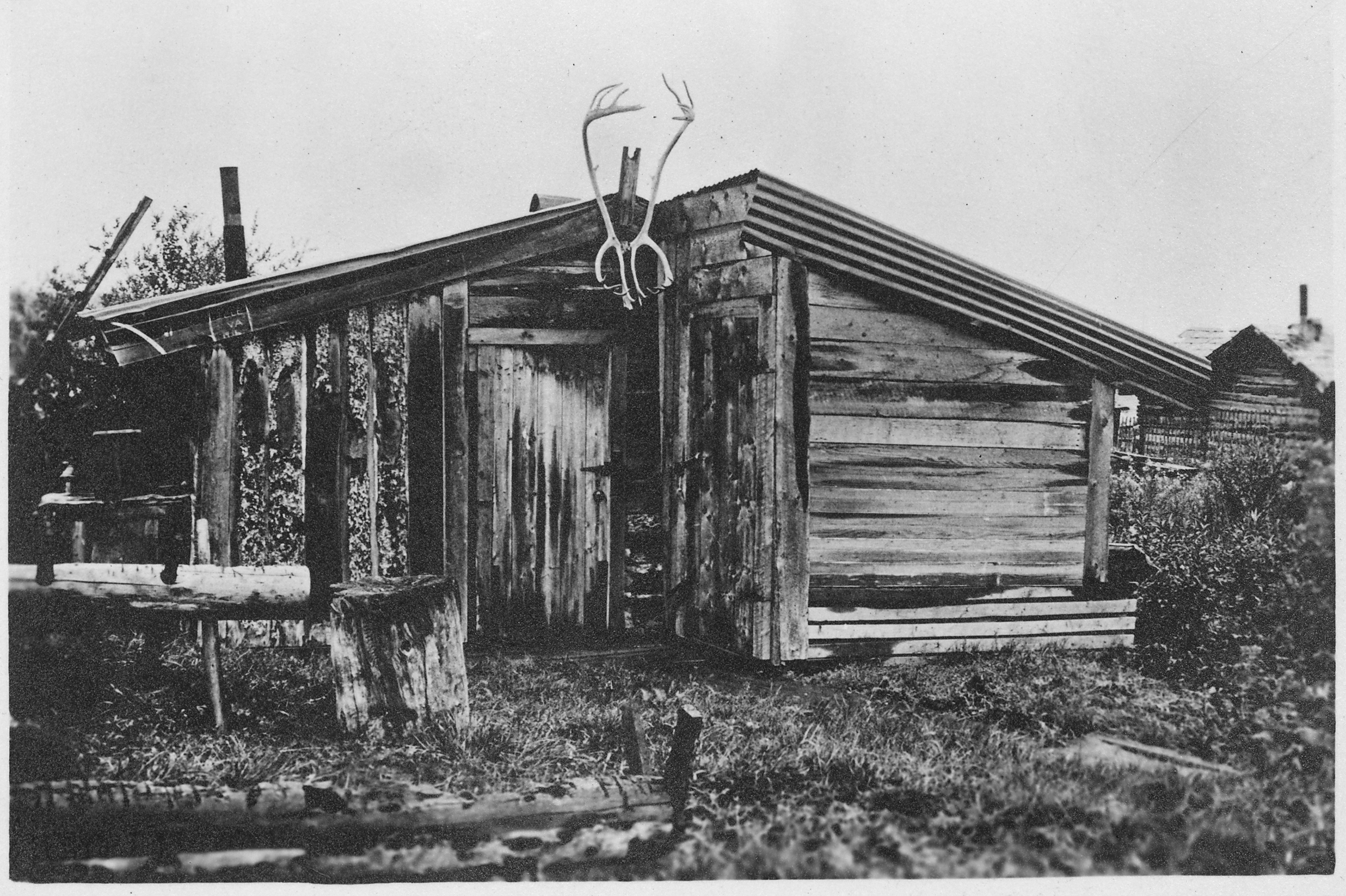
The Earps rented this cabin in Rampart, Alaska, from Rex Beach and spent the winter of 1898–1899 there.

On August 5, 1897, Earp and Josie once again joined in a mining boom and left Yuma, Arizona for San Francisco. They planned to head for Alaska to join in the Alaska Gold Rush, but their departure was delayed for three weeks when Wyatt fell while getting off Market Street streetcar and bruised his hip. Josephine got pregnant at the same time, and she thought she could persuade Earp from heading to Alaska. He was in agreement, but Josephine, who was 37, miscarried soon after.

They boarded the steamship Rosalie for Nome, Alaska, on September 21. When they got to Wrangell, the season was already late, and they chose to winter in Rampart. They rented a cabin from Rex Beach for $100 a month and spent the winter of 1898–1899 there. He managed a small store during the spring of 1899 in St. Michael on the Norton Sound, a major gateway to the Alaskan interior via the Yukon River.

In the spring they decided the gold rush in Dawson was drawing to an end and headed for Nome instead. Earp and partner Charles E. Hoxie built the Dexter Saloon, the largest in Nome. Josephine gambled so recklessly that Wyatt cut her off and asked other gambling houses to do the same. She also gambled on the boats to and from Alaska.

In November 1899, they left Alaska for a period and went to Seattle, Washington, with a plan to open a saloon and gambling room. On November 25, 1899, the Seattle Star reported Earp's arrival. Although gambling was illegal, the police were paid by John Considine, owner of the three largest gambling concessions, to look the other way. Considine tried to keep Earp from succeeding, and arranged for his establishment to be raided. The Earps returned briefly to San Francisco in April 1900, but they returned to Seattle before boarding the steamer SS Alliance. On June 14, 1900, Wyatt and Josephine were bound for Nome, Alaska.

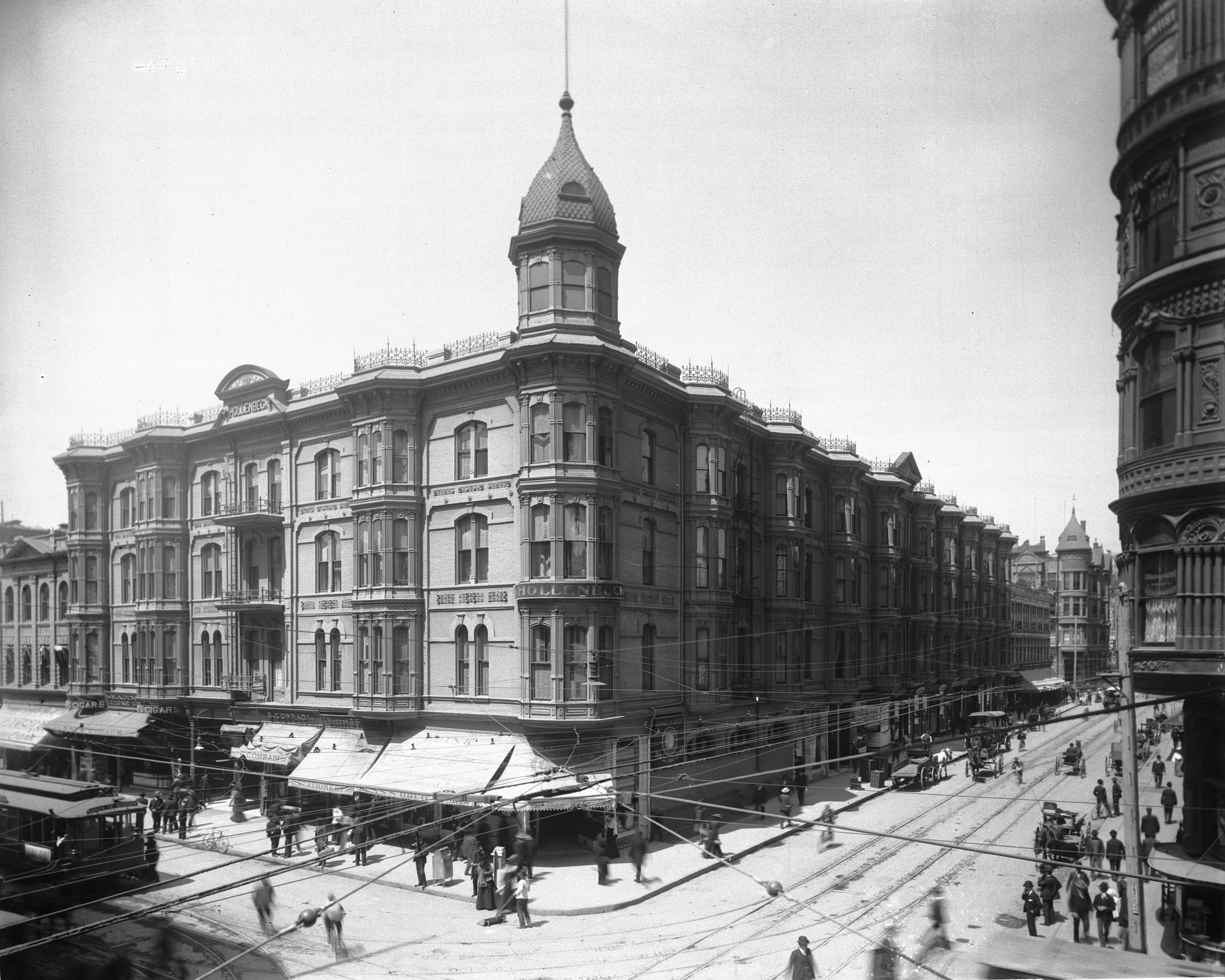
The Earps stayed at the Hollenbeck Hotel in Los Angeles in December 1901 after returning from Alaska.

Wyatt and Josie returned to Los Angeles on December 13, 1901, and stayed at the Hollenbeck Hotel. They had an estimated $80,000, a relative fortune (equivalent to about $3,100,000 today). In February 1902, they arrived in Tonopah, Nevada, known as the "Queen of the Silver Camps," where silver and gold had been discovered in 1900 and a boom was under way. He opened the Northern Saloon in Tonopah and served as a Deputy U.S. Marshal under Marshal J.F. Emmitt.

=== Desert cottage ===
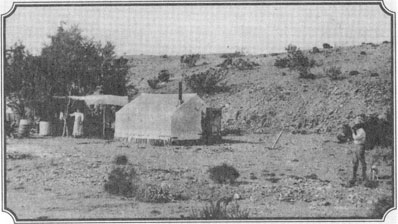
Wyatt Earp's camp, tent and ramada near Vidal, California and Wyatt's mining operations. Sadie is at left, Wyatt is on the right with his dog.

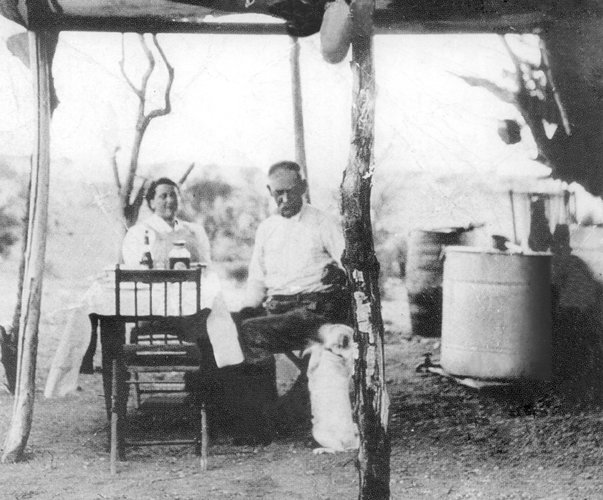
Wyatt and Josephine Earp in their ramada near their mining claim outside Vidal, California: This is the only confirmed picture of the two of them together.

After Tonopah's gold strike waned, Wyatt staked mining claims just outside Death Valley and elsewhere in the Mojave Desert. In 1906 he discovered several deposits of gold and copper near the Sonoran Desert town of Vidal, California, on the Colorado River and filed more than 100 mining claims near the Whipple Mountains. Wyatt and Josie Earp summered in Los Angeles and lived in at least nine small Los Angeles rentals as early as 1885 and as late as 1929, mostly in the summer. They bought the only home they ever owned, a small cottage in Vidal, and lived there during the fall, winter and spring months of 1925 – 1928, while he worked his Happy Days mines in the Whipple Mountains a few miles north. Wyatt had some modest success with the gold mines and they lived on the slim proceeds of income from that and investments in Oakland and Kern County oil field. Josie's three nieces, daughters of her half-sister Rebecca and husband Aaron Wiener, would frequently visit the couple during the winter months at their desert camp.

=== Life in Los Angeles ===
In about 1923, Charles Welsh, a friend who Earp had known since his time in Dodge City in 1876, and a retired railroad engineer, frequently invited the Earps to visit his family in San Bernardino, Needles, and later in Los Angeles. The Earps were frequent visitors and often spent the holidays with the Welsh family, but they did not appreciate Josephine's gambling habits.

=== Gambling habit ===
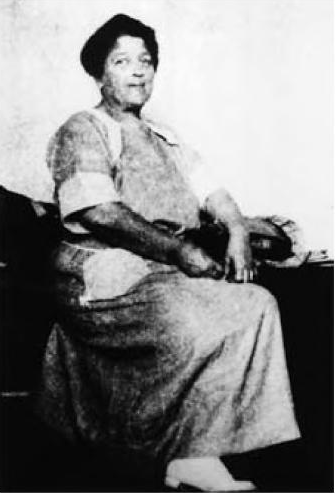
Josephine "Sadie" Marcus Earp, the common law wife of Wyatt Earp, on July 4, 1921.

Josephine loved to play poker and developed a serious gambling habit, losing heavily at times.

While they lived in San Diego, Wyatt raced Otto Rex, the horse he had won in a card game. The horse was a frequent winner and sometimes Wyatt bought Josephine some jewelry with the proceeds. To feed her gambling habit, Josephine would pawn the jewelry to millionaire Lucky Baldwin, but Wyatt would later buy the jewelry back. Josephine eventually sold virtually all of her jewelry to Baldwin. Josephine was addicted to gambling on horse racing and her wagering increased until Wyatt gave her an ultimatum. "You're not a smart gambler. And you have no business risking money that way. Now after this I'm not going to redeem any more of your jewelry." He also told Baldwin to stop lending money to Josephine, but she continued to gamble anyway. He was furious about her gambling habit, during which she lost considerable sums of money.

Wyatt refereed the Fitzsimmons vs. Sharkey boxing match on December 2, 1896, and was accused of fixing the outcome. He called a foul on Fitzsimmons that no one saw, and Wyatt was widely accused of taking a bribe. During an investigation of the boxing match by a panel appointed by San Francisco Mayor Washington Bartlett, they learned Josephine Earp was a "degenerate horseplayer" and that she frequently took loans out against her jewelry. The San Francisco Examiner ran a series of stories over three days describing Earp's life in exaggerated detail that ridiculed him. Eager to escape the controversy over the boxing match dogging him, Earp gave up managing race horses in San Francisco and on December 20, 1896, he and Josie left for Yuma, Arizona.

In the 1920s, Wyatt gave Josie signed legal papers and filing fees to a claim for an oil lease in Kern County, California. She gambled away the filing fees and lied to Wyatt about what happened to the lease, which later turned out to be valuable. Distrustful of her ability to manage her finances, Wyatt made an arrangement with her sister Henrietta Lenhardt. Wyatt put oil leases he owned in Henrietta's name with the agreement that the proceeds would benefit Josie after his death. Henrietta's three children voided the agreement after their mother's death and didn't pass on the royalties to Josephine.

=== Later relationship with Wyatt ===
Grace Welsh Spolidora, Welsh's daughter, spent a lot of time with the Earps. She said that during the last years of Wyatt's life, Josephine received an allowance from her family and gambled it away, often leaving Wyatt hungry. Wyatt became critically ill in late 1928. Grace recalled that Josie, who had never had many domestic skills, did very little housekeeping or cooking for Wyatt. She and her sister-in-law Alma were concerned about the care Josie gave Wyatt. Even though he was very ill, she still didn't cook for him. Grace, her sisters, Alma, and her mother brought in meals.

Wyatt died on January 13, 1929. Grace Welsh and her sister-in-law Alma were the legal witnesses to Wyatt's cremation. Josephine was apparently too full of grief to assist or to attend the funeral itself. Grace was upset that Josephine didn't attend. "She didn't go to his funeral, even. She wasn't that upset. She was peculiar. I don't think she was that devastated when he died." After Wyatt's death, Josephine told her friends and family to stop calling her Sadie, Wyatt's name for her, and insisted they call her Josie.

While in Los Angeles, Wyatt and Josephine became friends with many celebrities, including Cecil B. DeMille and Gary Cooper. In 1939 Josephine sued 20th Century Fox for $50,000 in an attempt to keep them from making the film titled Wyatt Earp: Frontier Marshal. With the provision that Wyatt's name be removed from the title, the movie was released as Frontier Marshal. She received some royalties from the movie and one-half of the royalties earned by Stuart Lake's book about her husband. After Wyatt died, Josephine spent her last years in Los Angeles.

=== Death and burial ===
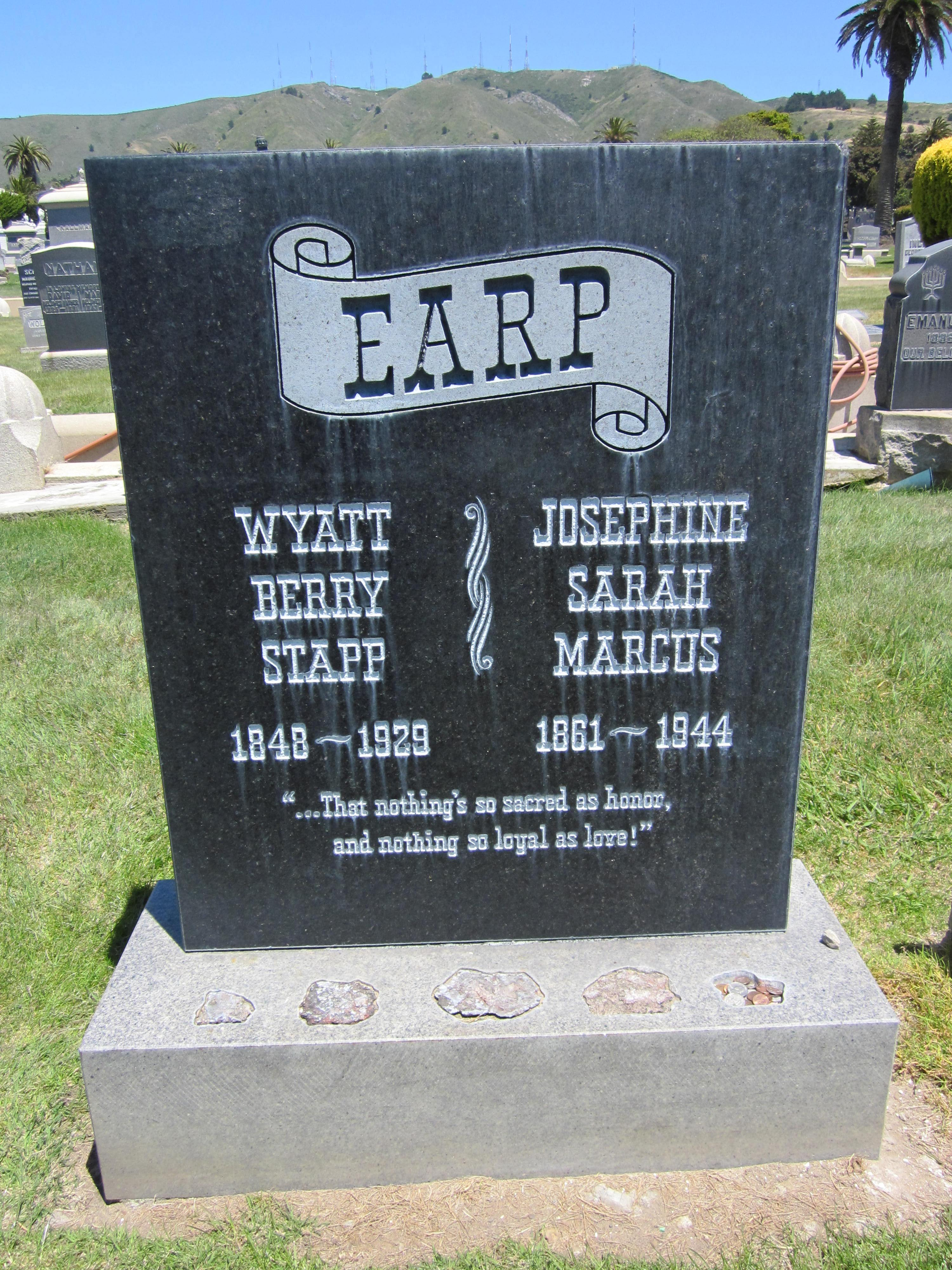
Josephine and Wyatt Earps' grave at the Hills of Eternity cemetery in Colma, California.

When Wyatt died in 1929, Josephine Earp had his body cremated and secretly buried him in the Marcus family plot in the Jewish Hills of Eternity Memorial Park in Colma, California. Josephine died at age 83 on December 19, 1944, in the same bungalow she and Wyatt shared at 4004 W. 17th Street in the West Adams district of Los Angeles. She died penniless. Sid Grauman of Grauman's Theater and cowboy actor and long-time friend of Wyatt Earp William S. Hart paid for her funeral and burial. Although she was never active in her Jewish faith, her service was conducted by a rabbi. Her body was cremated and buried next to Wyatt's remains.

She paid for a small white marble headstone which was stolen shortly after her death in 1944. It was discovered in a backyard in Fresno, California. A second stone of flat granite was also stolen. On July 7, 1957, grave-robbers dug into the Earp's grave in an apparent attempt to steal the urn containing his ashes, but unable to find them, stole the 300-pound (140 kg) grave stone. Actor Hugh O'Brian, who was playing Earp in the 1955–61 television series The Life and Legend of Wyatt Earp, offered a reward for the stone’s return. It was located for sale in a flea market.

Cemetery officials re-set the stone flush in concrete, but it was stolen again. Actor Kevin Costner, who played Earp in the 1994 movie Wyatt Earp, offered to buy a new, larger stone, but the Marcus family thought his offer was self-serving and declined. Descendants of Josie's half-sister Rebecca allowed a Southern California group in 1998–99 to erect the stone currently in place. The earlier stone is on display in the Colma Historical museum.

== In popular culture ==
In their later years Josephine worked hard to eliminate any mention that she had been Johnny Behan's mistress or of Wyatt's previous common law marriage to the prostitute Mattie Blaylock.

=== Book I Married Wyatt Earp ===
Cover of I Married Wyatt Earp, by Glenn Boyer, based in part on the so-called "Clum manuscript" supposedly written by Josephine. The book was discredited as largely fictional in 1999.

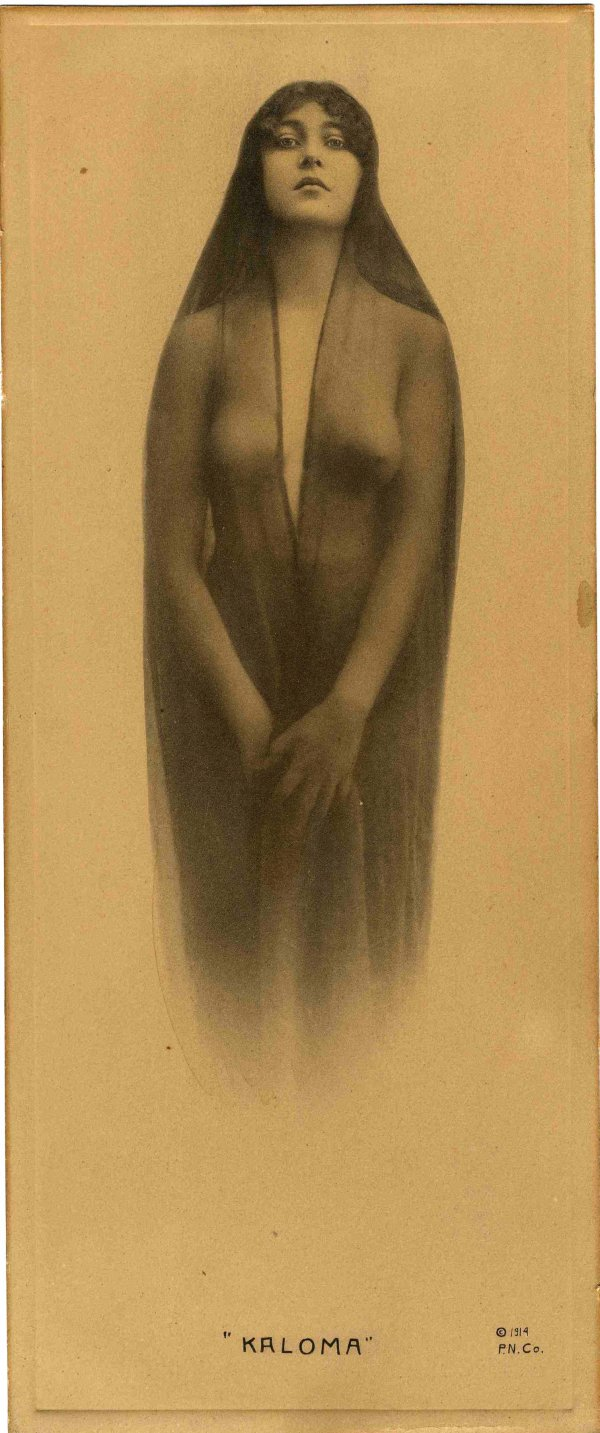
The original, unretouched photogravure used by Glen Boyer on the cover of I Married Wyatt Earp. He insisted it was a picture of Josephine from 1880 but the picture was actually copyrighted in 1914.

She successfully kept both women's names out of Stuart Lake's biography of Wyatt and after he died, Josephine may have threatened litigation to keep it that way. Lake corresponded with Josephine over several years, and he claimed she attempted to influence what he wrote and hamper him in every way possible, including consulting lawyers.

After Wyatt Earp's death, Josephine insisted on being called Josie or Josephine. Josephine sought to get her own life story published and gained the assistance of Wyatt's cousins Mabel Earp Cason and Cason's sister Vinolia Earp Ackerman. They recorded events in her life but found Josephine was evasive about her early life in Tombstone. She approached several publishers for the book, but backed out several times due to their insistence that she be completely open and forthcoming, rather than slanting her memories to her favor. Josephine wanted to keep what she viewed as their tarnished history in Tombstone private. Josephine insisted she was striving to protect Wyatt Earp’s legacy. She was also in need of money, and tried to sell a collection of books to Lake while he was writing the book.

Josephine finally changed her mind and asked Wyatt's cousins to burn their work, but Cason held back a copy, to which Glenn Boyer eventually acquired the rights, and is now in the custody of the Ford County Historical Society in Dodge City.

The University of Arizona Press published the book in 1976 under the title I Married Wyatt Earp: The Recollections of Josephine Sarah Marcus. It was immensely popular for many years, becoming the university's fourth all-time best selling book with over 35,000 copies sold. It was cited by scholars and relied upon as factual by filmmakers.

Beginning in about 1994, critics began to challenge the accuracy of the book, and eventually many parts of the book were refuted as fictional. In 1998, a series of articles by Tony Ortega in the Phoenix New Times, including interviews with Glenn Boyer, argued that Boyer invented large portions of the book. In 2000, the University responded to criticism of the university and the book and removed it from their catalog.

The book has become an example of how supposedly factual works can trip up researchers, historians, and librarians. It was described by the Annual Review of Information Science and Technology in 2006 as a creative exercise that cannot be substantiated or relied on.

=== Plays and films ===
- I Married Wyatt Earp (1983) played by Marie Osmond
- Tombstone (1993) – played by Dana Delany
- Wyatt Earp (1994) – played by Joanna Going
- I Married Wyatt Earp, an all-female musical, produced off-Broadway in 2011.
