= Pauline Markham =

British entertainer

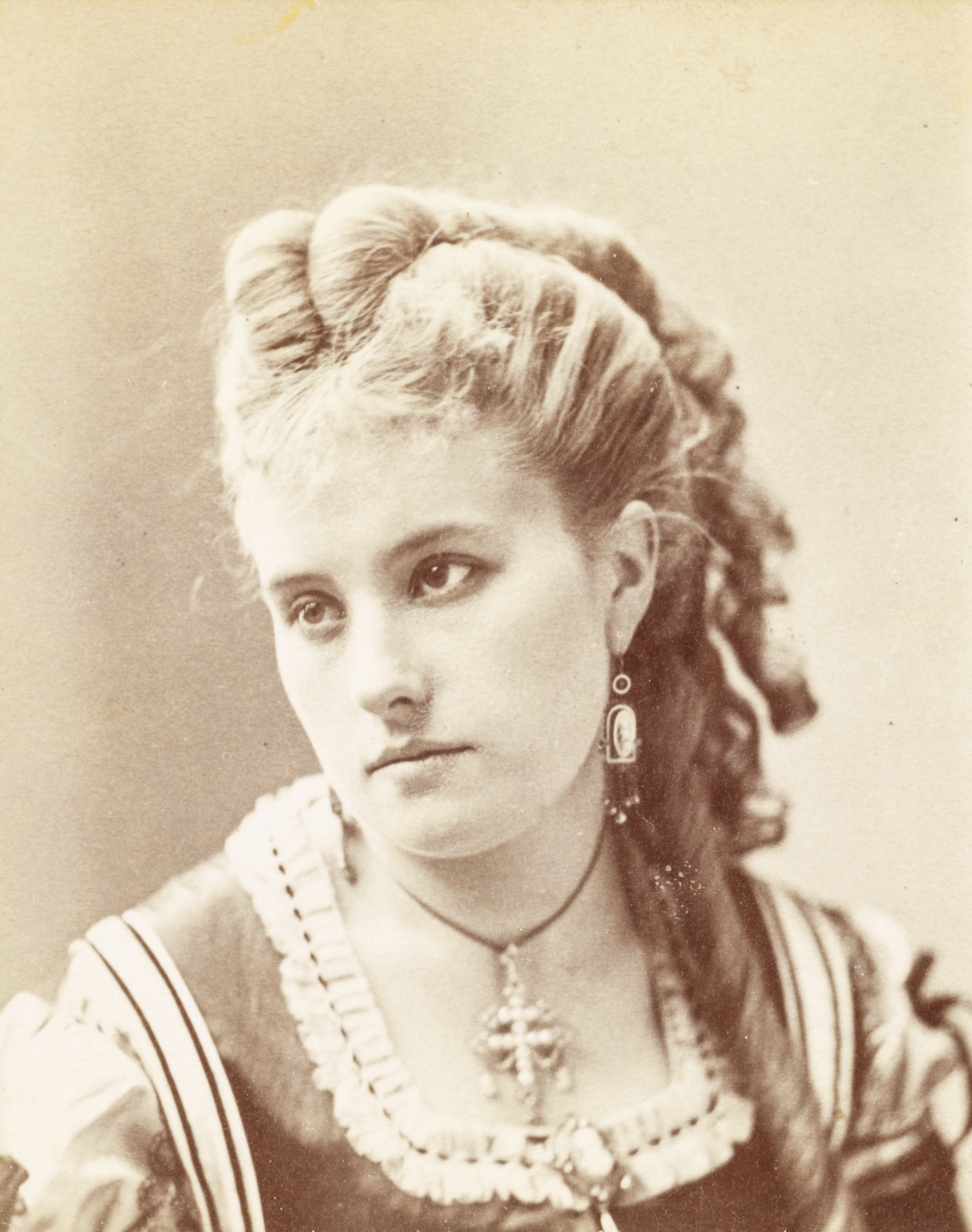
- c.1870
- Born: Margaret Hall or Hale; May 1847; London, England
- Died: 20 March 1919 (aged 71); New York City, U.S.
- Occupation: Burlesque-Vaudeville performer

Pauline Markham (born Margaret Hall or Hale, May 1847 – 20 March 1919) was an Anglo-American dancer and contralto singer active on burlesque and vaudeville stages during the latter decades of the 19th century. She began by performing juvenile roles in Manchester, made her debut on the London stage at 20 and a year later New York as a member of the British Blondes which introduced Victorian burlesque to America, where for a few years she would find phenomenal success before her career settled into a long steady decline.

The critic Richard Grant White once described Markham's singing as vocal velvet and her arms as the lost arms of the Venus de Milo. Markham had studied singing with Manuel García at the Royal Academy of Music in London.

== Early life and career ==
Markham was born in England and began her acting career at an early age playing principal boy parts at the Princess Theatre, Manchester. She made her London debut, not too many years later, on 15 November 1867, at the Queen's Theatre in Wigan's The First Night playing Rose, the intended debutant. In late June, 1868 she appeared at the Queen's Theatre in another Wigan play, Time and the Hour, of which one London critic said, "It is by no means good, and by no means bad."

== British Blondes ==
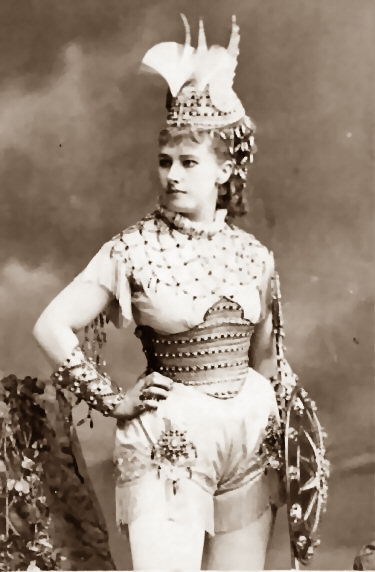
Pauline Markham c. 1870

Later in that year she accompanied Lydia Thompson to New York as a member of her British Blondes, opening at Wood's Museum (Broadway at 30th Street) on 28 September, in the burlesque of "Ixion, or the Man at the Wheel". In the piece Markham plays the goddess Venus who is seduced by King Ixion (Thompson). Ixion had a combined run of 102 matinee and evening performances before closing on 26 December 1868. The following February Markham began a long run at Niblo's Garden in Forty Thieves, Thompson's burlesque of Ali Baba and the Forty Thieves. At the Union Square Theatre (then the Grand Theatre Tammany) in August 1869 she played the central role Florizel in The Queen of Hearts, or Harlequin; the Knave of Hearts, that Stole the Tarts, and the Old Woman Who Lived in the Shoe, a production that at least one New York Herald critic considered as foolish as its title.

In October 1869 it was reported in the press that Markham's investments had made her a fortune on Wall Street. During this time she was earning upwards to $150 per week, at a time when an experienced actor might expect $50 for a week on the boards.

On 28 October 1870, Markham was seriously injured in a carriage accident in New York on Harlem Street, such that at least one newspaper reported her dead. Eleven days earlier she had opened with Thompson at Wood's Theatre in a burlesque of the Wallace opera Lurline and after a relatively short recuperation she chose to join the cast of the Niblo's December revival of The Black Crook playing what would turn out to be her signature role.

== The Black Crook ==
The Black Crook, a musical about an English ne'er do well who discovers his noble birth and decides to reform, was first produced in America at Niblo's Theatre in 1866 with a run in excess of 300 performances. Markham later became so identified with her characterization of the fairy queen Stalacta, that afterwards some chroniclers erroneously listed her among the original 1866 cast. The revival ran for 122 performances and would return several more times to New York and in tours of the country. During this time, it was not uncommon for Markham to receive after a performance bouquets of flowers festooned with jewelry from her male admirers.

The Black Crook, which featured actresses in flesh colored silk tights, has been credited with starting in 1866 what James Lauren Ford called "the great era of the leg show. A criticism of such shows in 1870 by Wilbur F. Storey, editor of the Chicago Times, led to the following incident.

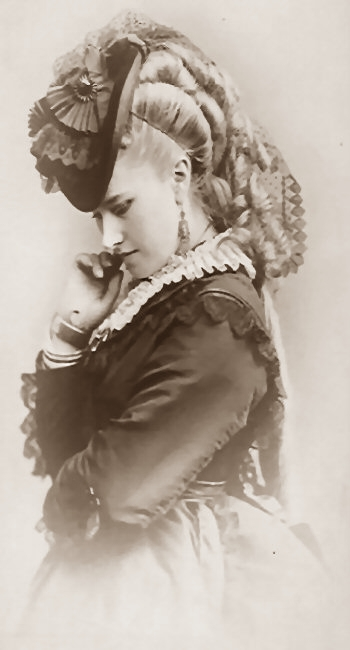
Pauline Markham c. 1870

Lydia Thompson’s troupe of "British Blondes" was playing an engagement at McVicker’s Theatre. It was the first so-called "leg" show to appear in Chicago. Mr. Storey had heard rumors of the alleged indecency of the performance and he sent one of his reporters to see the show and write his impressions. Mr. Storey also indited a few lines for the editorial page that fairly sizzled. The "rongst" was printed in the Times February 24, 1870.

That evening at five o’clock while Mr. Storey was on his way home from the office he was waylaid at Wabash avenue and Peck Court by Miss Thompson, Miss Markham and Mr. Henderson, manager of the "British Blondes." The editor was walking with his head down, as was his custom, when suddenly he was confronted by the trio. Mrs. Thompson drew short whip which was concealed in the folds of her skirt and began to rain blows down upon the head and shoulders of Mr. Storey. Unaware of the cause of the assault, Mr. Storey kept shouting: "What do you mean? What do you mean?" He raised his hands to ward off the blows and at this juncture Miss Markham snatched the whip from Miss Thompson. She also belabored the editor until pedestrians came to his rescue. Burnettsville News, April 24, 1919

The three were arrested and later pled guilty to assault with Markham receiving a $150 fine and Thompson and Henderson penalized $200 apiece.

Markham, with the help of Richard Grant White, published The Life of Pauline Markham in 1871.

In 1872 Markham appeared at Wood’s Museum with Belle Howitt in burlesque productions of Who Cried for the Rain, Red Riding Hood, The Three Musketeers and others, including several shows she had previously performed in with Thompson’s "British Blondes". The next year she toured with her own company in a piece described a fairy burlesque of the Golden Butterfly. That fall she returned to Niblo's Theatre to revive her role in The Black Crook.

== Randolph M. McMahon ==
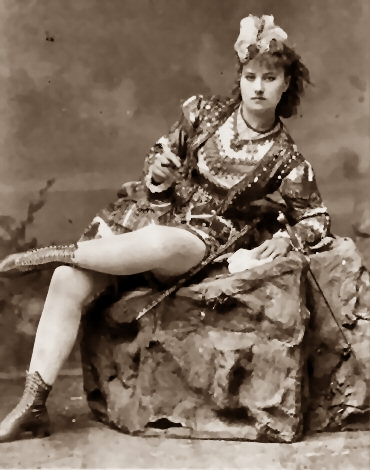
Pauline Markham c. 1870

In late November 1873 it was reported Markham had eloped with Randolph M. McMahon, a former Southern Civil War officer with a reported rank ranging anywhere from Colonel to Major General. A few days earlier Markham failed to appear for that night's performance of The Black Crook at Niblo's Theatre. It was later discovered the couple had skipped town to avoid detectives searching for McMahon over an extravagant unpaid hotel bill. Markham would later say of McMahon that he was abusive and controlling to the point that he would only allow her twenty-five cents to spend on meals. According to sporadic news accounts the two remained together for at least five years with McMahon as her manager.

In May 1874 Markham was reported singing for private circles in New Orleans and by the summer of 1875, back in London at the Haymarket Theatre supporting Charles Wyndham in a play entitled Brighton. She played in Dancing Dolls, a variety show at the Globe Theatre in August 1876, before returning to America the next year to tour with Adah Richmond's Burlesque Company. That fall she appeared on the legitimate stage in Boston at Howard's Athenaeum as Fanny Vanderbilt in The Charity Ball and later in a production of Robin Hood.

In February 1878 the press linked Markham to scandal involving a former governor of South Carolina and the issuing of fraudulent bonds. Markham denied any involvement with the scheme or that she was acquainted with any of the men mentioned in the papers as members of the South Carolina ring, telling her interviewer that they are not the kind of persons she permits herself to associate with.

The following year Markham's company toured the west presenting H. M. S. Pinafore. Sadie Marcus, later in life the common-law wife of gambler and lawman Wyatt Earp, claimed that she was a member of the troupe, but no corroborating evidence has been found to support her claim. Her name was never included among those on the Markham troupe's rolls in 1879.

== Randolph Murray ==
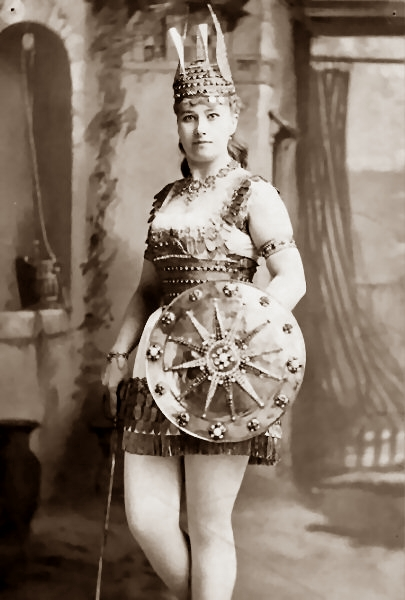
Pauline Markham c. 1870

She married again in 1883 to Randolph Murray, an actor-manager, late of the British Army. A scandal arose shortly thereafter when the press discovered Murray had not ended an 1880 marriage before he wed Markham. He claimed he was drunk at the time and that his bride deserted him a week later. Murray walked with a limp said to have been caused by a minié ball still embedded in his leg dating back to his service in India. His acting career in America began in the early 1870s at the Cleveland Academy of Music as W. C. Davenport. Markham and Murray would perform together in a number of legitimate stage performances during their marriage. She divorced him in 1891, reportedly on the grounds of infidelity.

== Later years ==
Over the first ten years of her career Markham was thought to have earned $250,000 and received some $100,000 in gifts. Her later career would still achieve some highs, but also a number of lows with more than one of her shows collapsing in mid tour and an incident involving a tour manager who disappeared with the troupe's funds. After her second marriage she eventually slipped into poverty with newspaper accounts of her working as a scrub woman and sometimes taking bit parts under an assumed name. If these accounts are true her poverty, at least in part, resulted from the broken leg she suffered around 1892 after falling through an open cellar door along a stretch of sidewalk in Louisville, Kentucky. Five years later she was awarded through a negligence lawsuit $5,000 from city of Louisville. In 1897 Markham attempted a comeback in vaudeville that appears to have ended the following year at Tony Pastor's in dramatic skits with Catherine Dann.

== Adelard Gravel and final years ==
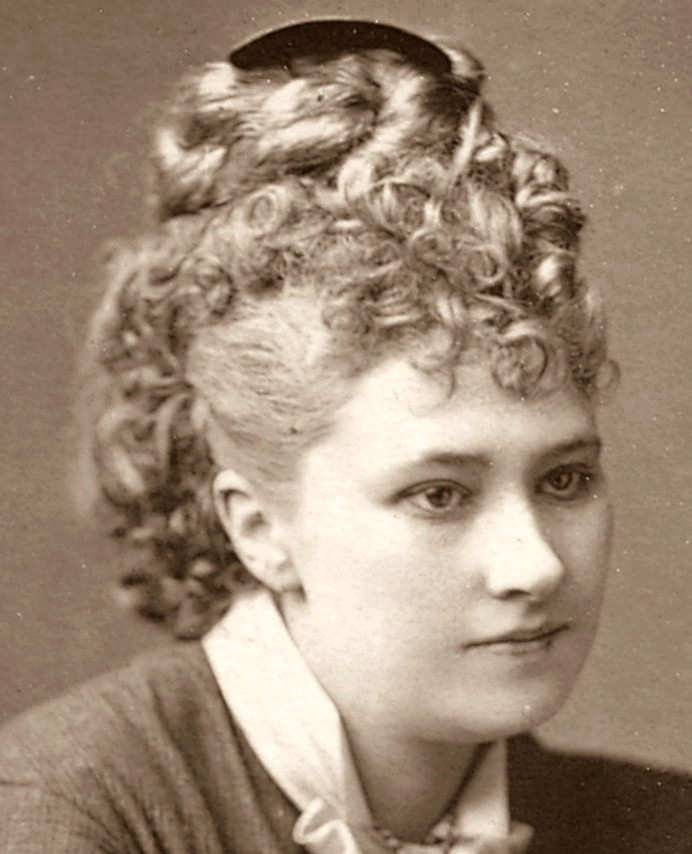
Pauline Markham 1847–1919

By 1900 she was married to Adelard Gravel, a Manhattan-based French-Canadian artist and printer that the press described as "moderately prosperous". In late 1905 Markham was reported to be near death with pneumonia though later press clarified it to be a serious case of the measles. She lived on with her husband for another fourteen years, dying in New York at the age of 71.
