= I Married Wyatt Earp =

Literary hoax memoir

- Cover of the University Press edition
- Author: Glenn Boyer
- Language: English
- Genre: Memoir, non-fiction novel
- Publisher: University of Arizona Press, later Sinclair-Stevenson Ltd
- Publication date: 1976
- Publication place: United States
- Media type: Print (Hardback & Paperback)
- Pages: 227 (paperback edition)
- ISBN: 978-0-8165-0583-8

I Married Wyatt Earp (1976) is a book by amateur historian Glenn Boyer which was originally promoted as a memoir by Josephine Earp as edited by Boyer from her personal papers, and describing her marriage to Deputy U.S. Marshal Wyatt Earp. The book was later exposed as a complete fraud fabricated by Boyer.

Originally published by the University of Arizona Press, I Married is the second most popular book about Wyatt Earp that was ever published based on copies sold, and also one of the best selling books issued by the University of Arizona. It was regarded for many years as a factual account that shed considerable light on the life of Wyatt Earp and his brothers in Tombstone, Arizona Territory. I Married was cited in scholarly works, assigned as a text in classrooms, and used as a source by filmmakers. The book's author said the image on the cover of a scantily-clad woman was of Josephine in her 20s, and based on his statements, copies of the image were later sold at auction for up to $2,875.

Boyer did in fact have a long-term contact with members of the Earp family, which appeared to bolster his credibility. He claimed the memoir was based on two manuscripts written by Josephine Earp in collaboration with others. Josephine was known to fiercely protect details of her and Wyatt's early life in Tombstone, even threatening litigation to keep some details private, and was known to have prepared autobiographical documents. This secrecy around Wyatt's life and marriage led to widespread curiosity which Boyer exploited.

In 1994, Western researchers and rival authors identified discrepancies in I Married Wyatt Earp and began to challenge the authenticity of the supposed documents Boyer cited. Critics also claimed to have identified factual errors and inconsistencies in other books published by Boyer, leading to an increasing number of questions about the veracity of his work. The risque cover image was linked to a photogravure titled Kaloma that had been first published by a novelty company in 1914. A 1998 investigative article in the Phoenix New Times revealed Boyer could not prove one of the supporting documents even existed, and also noted how Boyer refused to allow access to the claimed source documentation. The Phoenix New Times article also disclosed how the university press' editor encouraged Boyer to embellish his manuscript. During the interview, Boyer said he felt a responsibility to protect the reputation of the Earp brothers, and also stated he "had a license to say any darned thing I please...[to] lie, cheat, and steal". Boyer found another publisher and continued to publish the work, representing it as an authentic history of Wyatt Earp's life.

== Origins ==
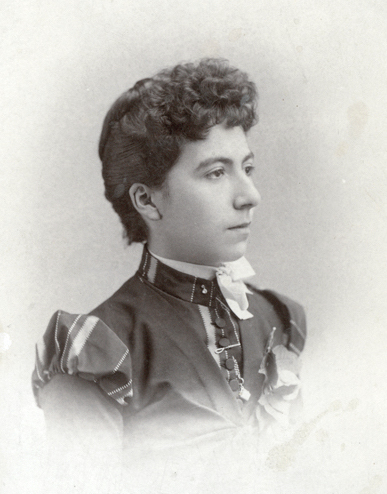
Disputed portrait of Josephine Sarah Marcus at about age 20, c. 1881, by C. S. Fly

After the death of Wyatt Earp, Josephine Marcus Earp tried to get her own life story published. She sought the assistance of Wyatt's cousins Mabel Earp Cason and Cason's sister Vinola Earp Ackerman. The cousins recorded events in Josephine's life and found Josephine was generous with details about her life after Tombstone, but could not remember events before and while she lived in the town. The Cason manuscript the Earp cousins produced had a serious limitation: it was missing the family's most compelling and interesting story, the time while Josephine and Wyatt lived in Tombstone. Cason and her sister pressured Josephine to supply as much information about her time in Tombstone as she readily recalled about the rest of her life, but Josie resisted. She was very protective of her and Wyatt's image. She finally revealed only a few details, including that she had returned to Arizona when Johnny Behan promised to marry her, but was disillusioned when he continually put off the wedding.

Josephine approached several publishers about the book, but backed out each time due to their insistence that she be completely open and forthcoming, rather than slanting her memories to her favor. Mable Earp Cason says she and her sister "finally abandoned work on the manuscript because she would not clear up the Tombstone sequence where it pertained to her and Wyatt". When Josephine could not find a publisher, she changed her mind and asked the cousins to burn their work, but Cason held back a copy, to which amateur historian Glenn Boyer eventually acquired the rights.

Boyer donated the original The Cason Manuscript to the University of Arizona, which is housed in a special collection and a second copy to the Ford County Historical Society. When Boyer presented the idea of publishing the manuscript to the University of Arizona, they insisted the book had to cover the period in Tombstone. Boyer produced a second, previously unknown and still unseen manuscript, that he said Josephine had worked on between 1929 and 1932 with the help of John Clum, a former editor of The Tombstone Epitaph newspaper. This became known as the "Clum manuscript".

=== Notability ===
The University of Arizona Press published the book in 1976 under the title I Married Wyatt Earp: The Recollections of Josephine Sarah Marcus. The copyright was issued in her name and her name was given as the author. A book published by a university press usually must meet a high standard. When it is sold as non-fiction, academics consider the university's approval sacrosanct.

Boyer's book gained wide acceptance as a memoir written by Josephine and an accurate portrayal of her life with Wyatt Earp. The book was immensely popular for many years, capturing the imagination of people with an interest in western history, studied in classrooms, cited by scholars, and relied upon as factual by filmmakers. It became the university's fourth all-time best-selling book with 12 printings totaling more than 35,000 copies. It is the second-largest selling book about Wyatt Earp.

Boyer in turn received wide recognition as the foremost authority on Wyatt Earp. Following on the success of I Married Wyatt Earp, Boyer published over the next 30 years a stream of apparently well-researched and provocatively reasoned papers. He is responsible for the publication of Big Nose Kate's memoirs as well as the long-sought Flood Manuscript written with Wyatt Earp's direct input.

For many years, the book was accepted as a legitimate historical document and was cited by important works on Tombstone like And Die in the West by Paula Mitchell Marks, Doc Holliday: A Family Portrait by Karen Holliday Tanner, and Richard Maxwell Brown's social history of frontier law, No Duty to Retreat (Oxford, 1991). The book was even adopted as required reading in history classes. University of New Mexico history professor Paul Hutton, who has served as executive director of the Western History Association, noted in 1998 that the University of Arizona had been selling the book for 23 years as an individual's memoir and an important historical document.

However, critics began to question Boyer's sources for the book in the 1990s. Stephen Cox, then director of the University of Arizona Press, told the Arizona Daily Star in July 1998 that he stood behind the authenticity of the book.

== Book sources ==
According to an interview with Boyer in 2009, when he turned 85, his family had a long-standing relationship with the Earps. According to Boyer, his father was a janitor in a saloon owned by Josie and Wyatt in Nome, Alaska. The son of Wyatt's good friend George Miller, Bill Miller, married Estelle Edwards, the daughter of Wyatt's sister Adelia Earp Edwards. Boyer said Bill and Estelle became a second set of parents to him.

When the Earp cousins attempted to write about Josephine's life in Tombstone, she was very evasive. Even when Wyatt was alive, she and her husband were very protective of their "past". Author Stuart N. Lake interviewed Earp eight times before his death and began writing his biography. Josie corresponded with Lake, and he insisted she attempted to influence what he wrote and hamper him in every way possible, including consulting lawyers. Josie claimed she was striving to protect Wyatt Earp's legacy. She successfully prevented her name from being mentioned in Lake's book Wyatt Earp: Frontier Marshal, and there is reason to believe that Lake avoided including her because she threatened legal action. As an unmarried woman in frontier Tombstone without visible means of support, perhaps an actress and a dancer, vastly outnumbered by men, if she had not been a prostitute, she undoubtedly was regarded by some as one.

Kit Scheifele, who was the original editor of Boyer's book for the University of Arizona Press, noticed that Boyer had removed wording from his original introduction to the book that made it clear "that the manuscript you have presented is not solely the first-person writing of Mrs. Earp, and that you have written a first-person account based on her memoirs and other material as well". She asked him to restore the content, but Boyer ignored her request. Karen Thure, who prepared the book for publication, questioned Boyer's sources from the beginning. She asked to see copies of the Clum manuscript more than once, and Boyer refused each time. "Glenn put a lot of Glenn in there. Glenn's theories appeared as Josie's," she said. "I think it's a shame that anyone took I Married Wyatt Earp literally," she says. "It's somewhere between history and historical fiction."

=== Clum manuscript sources ===
Boyer claimed to possess the so-called Clum manuscript. He said it contained details of Wyatt and Josie's life in Tombstone that were missing from the story she wrote with the Earp cousins. Boyer said that the Clum manuscript had been written by The Tombstone Epitaph publisher John Clum based on conversations with Josephine. But Boyer confused readers and critics when he changed the story behind the origins of the manuscript.

In 1977, Boyer published a pamphlet, Trailing an American Myth, in which he stated that the Clum manuscript was actually written by several authors. He wrote that their work formed "the basis of the Tombstone years in I Married Wyatt Earp and "the Ten Eyck Papers in Wyatt Earp's Tombstone Vendetta." In the same year, Boyer wrote and published another pamphlet, "Who Killed John Ringo?" It stated that fiction writers Dashiell Hammett, Wilson Mizner, Rex Beach and Walt Coburn had written a portion of the manuscript documenting Josephine' Tombstone years. When questioned about the origins of the Clum manuscript during the early 1980s, Boyer changed his story to say that he did not receive the Clum manuscript from Colyn after all, instead it was given to him by one of Earp's nieces, Jeanne Cason Laing in 1967.

When asked if these were all the same manuscript, Boyer replied, "Some of them are a manuscript. Some are only a mishmash, as a matter of fact... The earlier ones of those guys all lean heavily on Clum and Parsons for insights, which is one of the reasons they got in trouble with Josephine Earp... This is a broad way when I say I refer to a Clum manuscript, for example. It is a broad way of referring to something when really this is nobody's business in a way."

=== Cason manuscript origins ===
In addition to the manuscript written by Clum, Boyer said he had a copy of a manuscript that Josephine prepared with the help of two of her husband's cousins, Mabel Earp Cason and her sister Vinolia Earp Ackerman. Wyatts' cousins pressed her for details about her personal life before and while living in Tombstone, but she was evasive. Josephine wanted to keep her and Wyatt Earp's tarnished history associated with Tombstone private and sanitize anything that could be seen negatively. Josephine finally consented to tell them that upon returning to Arizona, she believed Johnny Behan was going to marry her, and was disappointed and disillusioned when he repeatedly delayed the wedding. In her version of events, she said years later that she lived with a lawyer while working as a housekeeper for Behan and his ten-year-old son, Albert.

Seeking more information, Boyer contacted Virgil Earp's granddaughter Mable Earp Cason only to learn she had died. Based on his reputation and success with his prior book on Earp, her daughter Jeanne Cason Laing cooperated with Boyer. She sifted through years of material her mother had collected during three attempts by her mother Mabel and aunt Vinnolia to write a biography of Josephine Earp. This included drafts and notes from their first attempt at collaborating with Josephine during the 1930s, which was part of something that Jeanne called "the Clum manuscript". Mabel also had collected materials and letters during 1955, when she made another attempt to get the work published, and corresponded with Earp historian John Gilchriese and the publishing house Houghton Mifflin. She has also collected clippings and correspondence with researchers during the mid-1960s. They loaned him "a stack of material almost a foot high."

Boyer argues that she actually lived with Behan. Boyer warns readers of "her 'little-old-lady' attempts to tell only the decorous and proper". Interviewers said she was often "difficult" to interview.

Boyer interviewed her and other family members, gleaning details of Josephine's life, and received additional documents and photographs. He said the documents contributed "to the overall fabric of Josie's story were undoubtedly made by former Tombstone mayor and Earp friend John Clum," but that "some Earp researchers got hung up on this 'manuscript' business".

=== Authenticity of the manuscripts ===
Boyer said he merged the Clum and Cason manuscripts, "which contained vastly different materials presented in widely different styles." To bolster the authenticity of the book, Boyer pointed to affidavits and letters from the Cason family. Virgil Earp's great-granddaughter Jeanne Cason Laing had provided Boyer with the collection of papers that included the source materials for the Clum manuscript in 1967. In a September 21, 1983 statement, Laing wrote, "I believe the book edited by Mr. Boyer is bona fide in its entirety and is remarkably accurate in its portrayal of Mrs. Earp's character and personality."

"My mother and Aunt were aware of the earlier 'Clum' manuscript covering the Tombstone years, and for that reason were willing to burn that portion of their manuscript at Mrs. [Josephine] Earp's request. My aunt had written that portion." Laing was not a historian or writer and had not cataloged the material. She had not seen the so-called Clum manuscript and relied on Boyer's word as to its authenticity. Although the exact contents of the stack of materials Laing gave Boyer are unknown, Jeanne Cason Laing and other members of her family insisted that Josephine had started a manuscript with John Clum.

Jack Burrows, who wrote John Ringo, The Gunfighter Who Never Was, said, "How can he just take a stack of material and give it a name that has nothing to do with what's included? You can take a cowpie and call it filet mignon, but somebody's going to catch on during dinner. This is just gobbledygook."

Virgil's great-grand-niece Alice Greenberg found a collection of type-written pages along with a sketch of the gunfight of the O.K. corral. The manuscript turned out to be the long-missing Flood manuscript and the sketch had been drawn by Wyatt Earp from memory.

=== Errors noted ===
The Clum manuscript was apparently Boyer's name for the materials given him by Laing, which include a collection of notes, newspaper accounts, memorabilia, and the written recollections of relatives, plus other materials he had acquired over many years. Boyer said that he "often used my knowledge of Josie when using dialogue so she could tell her tale, the way she wanted". He insisted that his knowledge of her life was "fortified by my written, taped and oral research," and that it didn't matter if "the details Josie gave in her memoirs are correct". Using the collection and his personal knowledge, he wrote his synthesized version of Marcus' life in Tombstone as if the words were Josephine's. Boyer also made several errors in the process.

One inconsistency noted by other researchers is the account of Warren Earp's death. Josephine allegedly wrote in I Married Wyatt Earp how Wyatt returned to Arizona to avenge Warren Earp's July 6, 1900 killing. However, on June 29, 1900, the Nome Daily News reported that Wyatt had been arrested for "interfering with an officer while in the discharge of his duty ... Earp, upon reaching the barracks, asserted that his action had been misconstrued, and that he had intended to assist the deputy marshal." Other references to him in the newspaper placed him in Alaska for the next several weeks. There was no way for Wyatt to get to Arizona in the time available.

Boyer's Josephine cites an article from the Tombstone Weekly Nugget of March 19, 1881—an article that smeared Earp's friend Doc Holliday by implicating him in a botched stagecoach robbery. "Doc's implication in this robbery through the propaganda of...the Nugget," she writes, "led straight to the Earps' shootout with the rustlers some six months later". But author Casey Tefertiller studied the Nugget microfiche and could not find a reference to Holliday. After further research, he suggested that Boyer had made a gaffe common to Earp researchers—he had lifted a confabulated version of the Nugget article from Billy Breakenridge's 1928 book, Helldorado: Bringing the Law to the Mesquite.

=== Earp family seek manuscript return ===
As the severity of Boyer's inventions became more widely known, Laura Cason, the granddaughter of Mable Earp Cason, who helped author the Cason Manuscript, issued a statement that said, "Mr. Boyer now claims that I Married Wyatt Earp is creative non-fiction when he has always led our family to believe it as a true account and memoir of Josephine Earp." In February 2000, when the controversy over the book became widely known, she formally asked Boyer to return the Cason manuscript, stating that they had always intended to only loan the material to him. "We are saddened to learn that Mr. Boyer has seemingly manipulated Cason family members over the years in an apparent effort to provide authentication when questions arose." Boyer reacted by threatening a lawsuit and said that younger members of the Earp descendants were motivated by greed. The younger Cason family members were never successful in any of their efforts to gain ownership of the manuscript. Boyer donated a copy of the manuscript, along with other materials, to the Dodge City Historical Society, but retained the right to only allow individuals he authorized to see the documents.

== Kaloma cover image ==
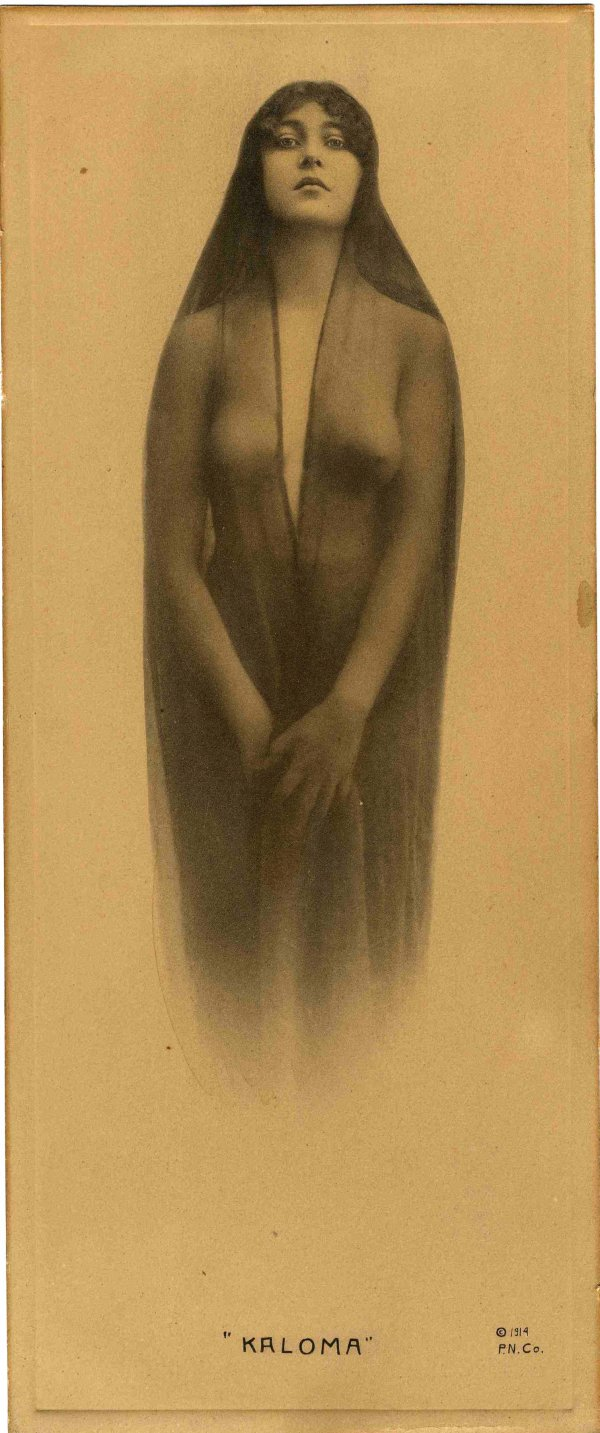
The original photogravure of a semi-nude woman used by Glenn Boyer on the cover of I Married Wyatt Earp. He insisted it was a picture of Josephine from 1880 but could provide no proof.

Boyer published I Married Wyatt Earp with a picture on the cover of a woman wearing a sheer gauze peignoir, re-touched to conceal her breasts and nipples. He insisted that the picture of the partially nude woman was Josephine when she was young, and that Johnny Behan took the photo of her in Tombstone in 1880.

=== Value at auction ===
Once the image appeared on the cover of the book, and due to the book cover attribution, copies of the portrait of "Josephine Earp" began to sell for hundreds and later thousands of dollars. Citations in auction catalogs and from dealer sales, all after the 1976 publication of I Married Wyatt Earp, were regularly used for a number of years to "verify" that the image was Josie Earp. On December 6, 1996 the image, represented as a picture of Josephine Earp, was offered by H. C. A. Auctions in Burlington, North Carolina, and sold for US$2,750.

Don Ackerman wrote Maine Antique Digest in April 1997 questioning the authenticity of the image sold at auction. Bob Raynor of the magazine acknowledged that H. C. A., after researching the image, had represented it as being Josie Earp. He noted that "Both Sotheby's and Swann Galleries identified and sold the photo image in 1996, both auctions prior to the December HCA auction." Raynor stated, "Please note that the image was used as a dust cover of the book I Married Wyatt Earp, published by University of Arizona Press, 1976. Additionally, the image was used in another book, Wyatt Earp's Tombstone Vendetta, published by Talei, and also in Pioneer Jews, Houghton Mifflin, 1984. In all instances the image was identified as Josephine Earp." However, all these sources postdate and rely on Boyer's use of the image on the cover of the book. On April 8, 1998, Sotheby's sold another copy of the image for $2,875.

=== Known origin ===
However, the first known published image of the photograph of the beautiful young woman boldly posing for the camera wearing a sheer gauze peignoir was circulated in 1914. Labeled "Kaloma," it was originally produced as an art print. The risqué image was popular and sold well. At the bottom right of the uncropped, original image is printed, "COPYRIGHT 1914-P N CO." The image was copyrighted and circulated by the Pastime Novelty Company of 1313 Broadway, New York, New York. The image was used in the same year on the cover of Kaloma, Valse Hesitante (Hesitation Waltz), composed by Gire Goulineaux and published by the Cosmopolitan Music Publishing Company in New York City. It was used as a pin-up image during World War I.

Most of the early Kaloma images seen to date are photogravures, a type of high-quality reproduction that has been produced since the 1850s, with a surge in popularity between 1890 and 1920. A photogravure is made from an engraving plate on a printing press, making them much less costly than actual photographs. Photogravures were often printed with title and publication data below the image and were commonly used to create many copies of high quality illustrations for books, postcards and art magazines.

The image regained popularity in the 1960s. One of the great rock poster designers of the time, Alton Kelley with Family Dog Productions in Haight Ashbury, made the image of the semi-nude woman as the centerpiece of his classic concert poster for Vanilla Fudge and The Charles Lloyd Quartet when they appeared at the Avalon Ballroom in San Francisco September 29-October 1, 1967.

=== Links to Josephine Earp ===
No evidence has been found that links the picture to Josephine before Boyer's book was published in 1976, and no primary sources have been found that link the photo to Josephine's time in Tombstone. Many individuals share similar facial features and faces on people who look radically different can look similar when viewed from certain angles. Because of this, most museum staff, knowledgeable researchers and collectors require provenance or a documented history for an image to support physical similarities that might exist. Experts will rarely offer even a tentative identification of new or unique images of famous people based solely on similarities shared with other known images.

An analysis of the photograph shows that the fashion and hair style of the young woman are not from the 1880s time frame, but from the early 20th Century. If the 1914 copyright date is the year the picture was taken, Josephine Earp would have been 53 in 1914. Casey Terfertiller's book Wyatt Earp The Life Behind the Legend contains a picture of an elderly Josephine Marcus Earp on page 225. The photo is from the Robert G. McCubbin Collection and has been verified as authentic. The date of the photograph is estimated at about 1921. Josephine is elderly and very plump. This contrasts sharply with the alleged 1914 photo of a very young, thin and buxom "Josie".

On November 26, 1997, Dave McKenna of ABC Novelty Company, the successor to the original company that produced the image, wrote "I will confirm that this photo was copyrighted under the ABC name in 1914. In our warehouse we have a thousand similar photos of nude woman that we used and still use. My understanding is that the photographs were taken in New York or Boston."

Boyer responded to criticism of the validity of the image by offering to sell proof in a booklet available from his company, "Historical Research Associates" operated out of his home in Rodeo, New Mexico. When asked directly about the authenticity of the image in 2009, he replied, "Actually the publisher made the decision for the cover. My take? If it's not her, it ought to be."

== Other invented sources ==
Several Western researchers have uncovered a pattern in Boyer's publications of inventing not only sources but fictional individuals who supply insight and perspective into real events and people. Jack Burrows wrote that Boyer "has published three different memoirs telling how Wyatt Earp killed Ringo, all giving different stories". Boyers justified the three different stories as representing three different people's perspectives. The Phoenix New Times reported in a lengthy investigative article that "Fiction appears to infuse much of his historical writings."

Boyer's first book, An Illustrated History of Doc Holliday, was published in 1966. Boyer wrote ten years later that he purposefully attempted to mislead others. Bogus photos of 'Perry Mallon,' 'Johnny Tyler,' and Doc's cousin 'Mattie Holliday' were inserted into a fabricated story about Doc and Wyatt killing Mallon and Tyler in Colorado. The picture of Mattie Holliday was a photograph of Boyer's father's cousin. Boyer was also criticized for planting allegedly bogus letters that he said came from descendants of a Texas friend of Doc's called "Peanut," a pseudonym for an anonymous and unknown individual.

Bob Palmquist, an attorney and avid Earp researcher, worked with Boyer for several years. He said that Boyer intended to write Wyatt Earp's Tombstone Vendetta as "...a novel in the style of a memoir as if somebody was actually telling the story, in this case Ted Ten Eyck". Boyer told other versions about the origins of Ted Ten Eyck, saying he had received a new manuscript from Earp family members, that the story was based on the unpublished memoir of a newspaper journalist who was present in Tombstone while the Earps were lawmen, and that he had used Ten Eyck as a literary device and the book was in the form of a "non-fiction novel". In a 1977 interview he altered his description of the newspaperman once again. He said, "I am Ten Eyck. I'm the literary artist that created the composite figure that I chose to call Ten Eyck."

== Effects on publication ==
Boyer responded to criticism saying he had an artistic license. His credibility was questioned, while his unwillingness or inability to provide researchers with evidence led the university to re-assess the book.

=== University withdraws book ===
In an interview in 1999, the university's current president Peter Likins described the book as having a "fictional format". Although Likens admitted he had not read the book, he said the book states that it is not a first-person account but a blend of secondary sources. The epilogue says that it is a memoir based on Josephine Earp's own writing. Likins characterized the disagreements about the book's authenticity as a squabble between non-academic authors hoping to promote different interpretations of Western history. It might take years, Likins said, for scholars to decide which version of Earp events was correct. During his investigation of Boyer's work, reporter Tony Ortega found that "the University of Arizona Press not only knew his sources were suspect, but they encouraged him to embellish". Marshall Townsend, director of the University of Arizona Press when Boyer's book was published, actively discouraged two editors from questioning Boyer, and repeatedly encouraged him to put "more of yourself" into the book.

Author Andrew Albanese wrote that "historians agree that the press has put its integrity on the line by allowing Boyer's bogus Tombstone account to enter the mainstream of Western history under the imprimatur of a scholarly press". In 1999, the University of Arizona Press director said they would reissue the book with a redesigned cover and alter the cover copy to make it clearer that the author was Glenn Boyer and not Josephine Earp. Hutton said that the university's decision to claim that the book is partly fiction after 23 years "is essentially foisting a fraud upon the public".

When confronted with allegations that his book was a hoax, Boyer said he had been misunderstood. "My work is beginning to be recognized by all but a few fanatics and their puppets as a classic example of the newly recognized genre 'creative non-fiction.'" Boyer compared his work to Pulitzer Prize winning author Edmund Morris, who wrote Dutch: A Memoir of Ronald Reagan. Professor Donna Lee Brien wrote that in his "confused defence" Boyer failed to differentiate between his actions, collecting and blending primary source documents with his own fictionalized accounts, and Morris's very "experimental biography which transparently acknowledged his inclusion of clearly recognisably fictional passages into traditionally sourced and referenced text." She noted that "...as soon as Boyer invented source manuscripts, fabricated elements of the story and presented his own speculations as historical fact, he was not writing creative nonfiction but historical fiction—that is, fiction based on historical events."

In early 2000 the university refused to comment about the book and referred all questions to university lawyers. On January 29, 2000, Boyer posted a note on Amazon.com that he intended to take back the rights to the book. In March the University of Arizona Press announced they had released all rights to the book, removed the book from their catalog, and returned unsold copies to Boyer. Boyer claimed he decided to drop publication because he was disappointed with the university's handling of movie rights. Boyer found a small non-academic publisher, shortened the title to I Married Wyatt Earp, and shifted authorship to his own name.

=== Boyer response ===
Boyer has admitted that the book is "100 percent Boyer". He said that he is uninterested in what others think of the accuracy of what he has written. "This is an artistic effort. I don't have to adhere to the kind of jacket that these people are putting on me. I am not a historian. I'm a storyteller." Boyer said the book was not really a first-person account, that he had interpreted Wyatt Earp in Josephine's voice, and admitted that he could not produce any documents to vindicate his methods.

Boyer admitted that two other books he had written, An Illustrated Life of Doc Holliday (Reminder Press, 1966), and Wyatt Earp's Tombstone Vendetta, (Talie, 1993) were not based on the documents he claimed to have used. He followed the last book with a fourteen-part series in True West magazine titled Wyatt Earp, Legendary American. Boyer responded to continuing questions about his sources and allegations of fraud, claiming that because of his close connection to the Earp family, he "had a license to say any darned thing I please for the purpose of protecting the reputation of the Earp Boys, which I committed myself to do. I can lie, cheat, and steal, and figuratively ambush, antagonize, poison wells, and all of the others [sic] things that go with a first class Vendetta, even a figurative one."

=== Accuracy ===
After her husband Wyatt Earp's death, Josephine Earp sought to get her own life story published. When she refused to be more forthcoming about details of her life in Tombstone, her collaborators gave up and Josephine asked them to burn all the copies. Wyatt's cousin Mabel Earp Carson held back a copy, to which amateur historian Glen Boyer eventually acquired the rights.

The University of Arizona Press published it in 1976 as a memoir I Married Wyatt Earp giving Josephine Earp credit as the author. In the book's epilogue, Boyer said he integrated two sources, Josephine's and a second, the so-called "Clum manuscript", which he said had been written by The Tombstone Epitaph publisher John Clum based on conversations with Josephine.

In the 1980s, critics began to question his sources and methods. When Boyer could not prove the existence of the Clum manuscript, he equivocated, saying that he did not receive the Clum manuscript from Colyn after all, instead it was given to him by one of Earp's nieces. Then he changed his story further, saying, "the Clum manuscript is a generic term," Boyer told Wildcat student-reporter Ryan Gabrielson. "This—in addition [to other source materials]--was supported by literally hundreds, maybe thousands of letters and documents."

When confronted with allegations that his book was a hoax, Boyer said he had been misunderstood. "My work is beginning to be recognized by all but a few fanatics and their puppets as a classic example of the newly recognized genre 'creative non-fiction.'" In March 2000, the University of Arizona Press removed the book from their catalog.

== Impact on Old West research ==
Professor of Western history Gary Roberts wrote that Earp researchers are burdened with discriminating between Boyer fact and Boyer fiction. "By passing off his opinions and interpretations as primary sources, he has poisoned the record in a way that may take decades to clear." Boyer's work is so enmeshed into the literature that if it is discredited virtually everything written since I Married Wyatt Earp was published is suspect to the extent that its conclusions are based on material drawn from Boyer.

The book has become an example of how supposedly factual works can trip up the public, researchers, and librarians. It was described by the Annual Review of Information Science and Technology in 2006 as a "creative exercise" and hoax. Other authors agreed that the book cannot be relied on.

Glenn Boyer's contributions to Wyatt Earp studies were widely regarded, but doubts raised by Wyatt Earp's Tombstone Vendetta seriously damaged his credibility. Author Gary Roberts, a Western historian, noted, "History is what's suffered the most. It's all kind of tragic really." Allen Barra, author of Inventing Wyatt Earp: His Life and Many Legends, believes that I Married Wyatt Earp is now recognized by Earp researchers as a hoax. Casey Tefertiller, a long-time critic of Boyer and the author of Wyatt Earp: The Life Behind the Legend, agreed. "This may be the most remarkable literary hoax in American history. It has been believed and accepted as the words of Josephine Earp for twenty-three years now." Tefertiller's book was one of the very few that did not use any of Boyer's work as a source. Boyer commented, "Writing about Earp and failing to mention me and my work is something like writing about Catholicism and neglecting to mention the Pope."

== In other media ==
=== Television ===
A 1983 television movie based on the book was directed by Michael O'Herlihy, starring Marie Osmond as Josie Marcus, Bruce Boxleitner as Wyatt Earp, and John Bennett Perry as John Behan.

=== Theatre and film ===
Based in part on Boyer's work, the all-female musical I Married Wyatt Earp was written and performed beginning in 2006 at the Bristol Riverside Theatre in Bucks County, Pennsylvania. It was produced off-Broadway in 2011.
