= List of places in Arizona (C) =

This is a list of cities, towns, unincorporated communities, counties, and other places in the U.S. state of Arizona, which start with the letter C. This list is derived from the Geographic Names Information System, which has numerous errors, so it also includes many ghost towns and historical places that are not necessarily communities or actual populated places. This list also includes information on the number and names of counties in which the place lies, its lower and upper ZIP code bounds, if applicable, its U.S. Geological Survey (USGS) reference number(s) (called the GNIS), class as designated by the USGS, and incorporated community located in (if applicable).

== C ==
Name of place	Number of counties	Principal county	GNIS #(s)	Class	Located in	ZIP code	
Name of place	Number of counties	Principal county	GNIS #(s)	Class	Located in	Lower	Upper
Cactus Flats	1	Graham County	2582744	CDP		85546	
Cactus Forest	1	Pinal County	2582745	CDP		85232	
Calabasas	1	Santa Cruz County	27169	Populated Place	Rio Rico		
Calva	1	Graham County	2383	Populated Place		85530	
Cameron	1	Coconino County	2407943	CDP		86020	
Camp Creek	1	Maricopa County	27200	Populated Place		85331	
Campo Bonito	1	Pinal County	2582746	CDP			
Campstone	1	Cochise County	24342	Populated Place			
Camp Verde	1	Yavapai County	2413154	Civil (Town)		86322	
Cane Beds	1	Mohave County	2582747	CDP		86022	
Canelo	1	Santa Cruz County	27253	Populated Place		85611	
Canyon Day	1	Gila County	2407956	CDP		85926	
Canyon Diablo	1	Coconino County	24344	Populated Place			
Carefree	1	Maricopa County	2413168	Civil (Town)		85377	
Carmen	1	Santa Cruz County	27290	Populated Place		85640	
Carrizo	1	Gila County	2582748	CDP		85901	
Casa Blanca	1	Pinal County	2612137	CDP		85221	
Casa Grande	1	Pinal County	2409401	Civil (City)		85222	
Casa Piedra	1	Santa Cruz County	27317	Populated Place			
Casas Adobes	1	Pima County	2407980	CDP		85704	
Cascabel	1	Cochise County	27318	Populated Place			
Cashion	1	Maricopa County	2511	Populated Place	Avondale	85329	
Castle Butte	1	Navajo County	24346	Populated Place			
Castle Dome Landing	1	Yuma County	24347	Populated Place			
Catalina	1	Pima County	2407989	CDP		85738	
Catalina Foothills	1	Pima County	2407990	CDP		85718	
Cave Creek	1	Maricopa County	2413182	Civil (Town)		85331	
Cedar	1	Mohave County	24350	Populated Place			
Cedar Creek	1	Gila County	2582749	CDP		85926	
Cedar Springs	1	Navajo County	24352	Populated Place			
Centennial Park	1	Mohave County	2582750	CDP			
Central	1	Graham County	2582751	CDP		85531	
Central Heights-Midland City	1	Gila County	2408005	CDP			
Cerbat	1	Mohave County	24353	Populated Place			
Chakpahu	1	Navajo County	24355	Populated Place			
Chalender	1	Coconino County	27478	Populated Place	Parks		
Chambers	1	Apache County	24356	Populated Place		86502	
Chandler	1	Maricopa County	2409433	Civil (City)		85224	
Chandler Heights	1	Maricopa County	2749	Populated Place		85227	
Charco	1	Pima County	2582752	CDP			
Cherry	1	Yavapai County	27538	Populated Place		86327	
Chiapuk	1	Pinal County	2806	Populated Place			
Chiawuli Tak	1	Pima County	2582753	CDP		85634	
Chico Shunie	1	Pima County	24363	Populated Place			
Chilchinbito	1	Navajo County	2408023	CDP		86033	
Chinle	1	Apache County	2408029	CDP		86503	
Chino Valley	1	Yavapai County	2413199	Civil (Town)		86323	
Chiulikam	1	Maricopa County	24366	Populated Place			
Chiuli Shaik	1	Pima County	24365	Populated Place			
Chloride	1	Mohave County	2582754	CDP		86431	
Choulic	1	Pima County	24367	Populated Place		85634	
Christmas	1	Gila County	2897	Populated Place		85292	
Christopher Creek	1	Gila County	2582755	CDP			
Chrysotile	1	Gila County	24368	Populated Place			
Chuichu	1	Pinal County	2407614	CDP		85222	
Chukut Kuk	1	Pima County	24369	Populated Place			
Chutum Vaya	1	Pima County	24370	Populated Place			
Chuwut Murk	1	Pima County	2919	Populated Place			
Cibecue	1	Navajo County	2407619	CDP		85911	
Cibola	1	La Paz County	2407620	CDP		85328	
Cienega Springs	1	La Paz County	2582756	CDP		85344	
Circle City	1	Maricopa County	2956	Populated Place		85342	
Citrus Park	1	Maricopa County	2582757	CDP		85340	
Clacks Canyon	1	Mohave County	2582758	CDP			
Clarkdale	1	Yavapai County	2413206	Civil (Town)		86324	
Claypool	1	Gila County	2407629	CDP		85532	
Clay Springs	1	Navajo County	2582759	CDP		85923	
Cleator	1	Yavapai County	27704	Populated Place		86333	
Clemenceau	1	Yavapai County	42736	Populated Place	Cottonwood	86326	
Clifton	1	Greenlee County	2413215	Civil (Town)		85533	
Coal Mine Mesa	1	Coconino County	3051	Populated Place		86045	
Cochise	1	Cochise County	3069	Populated Place		85606	
Cochran	1	Pinal County	24373	Populated Place			
Coconino	1	Coconino County	24374	Populated Place			
Colfred	1	Yuma County	24375	Populated Place			
Colorado City	1	Mohave County	2413230	Civil (Town)		86021	
Columbia	1	Yavapai County	24376	Populated Place			
Comobabi	1	Pima County	2582760	CDP		85634	
Concho	1	Apache County	2582761	CDP		85924	
Congress	1	Yavapai County	2407653	CDP		85332	
Constellation	1	Yavapai County	42812	Populated Place			
Continental	1	Pima County	27862	Populated Place	Green Valley	85640	
Coolidge	1	Pinal County	2410221	Civil (City)		85228	
Co-op Village	1	Maricopa County	3046	Populated Place		85339	
Copper Creek	1	Pinal County	24379	Populated Place			
Copper Hill	1	Gila County	2582762	CDP			
Copperopolis	1	Yavapai County	24380	Populated Place			
Cordes	1	Yavapai County	27940	Populated Place			
Cordes Lakes	1	Yavapai County	2407661	CDP		86333	
Cornfields	1	Apache County	2582763	CDP			
Cornville	1	Yavapai County	2407662	CDP		86325	
Corona de Tucson	1	Pima County	2407663	CDP			
Cortaro	1	Pima County	24384	Populated Place	Marana	85652	
Corva	1	Coconino County	27984	Populated Place			
Cosnino	1	Coconino County	27987	Populated Place			
Cotton Center	1	Maricopa County	24385	Populated Place			
Cottonwood (Apache County)	1	Apache County	2582764	CDP			
Cottonwood (Yavapai County)	1	Yavapai County	2410242	Civil (City)		86326	
Courtland	1	Cochise County	24387	Populated Place			
Cove	1	Apache County	25261	Populated Place		87461	
Cowlic	1	Pima County	2582765	CDP		85634	
Cow Springs	1	Coconino County	24388	Populated Place		86044	
Crag	1	Maricopa County	24391	Populated Place			
Crookton	1	Yavapai County	24392	Populated Place			
Crown King	1	Yavapai County	28197	Populated Place			
Crozier	1	Mohave County	2582766	CDP			
Crystal Beach	1	Apache County	2582767	CDP			
Curtiss	1	Cochise County	24394	Populated Place			
Cutter	1	Gila County	2582768	CDP		85501	
Cyclopic	1	Mohave County	24395	Populated Place			
