= Copperopolis =

Copperopolis may refer to:

- Copperopolis, Arizona, a populated place in Yavapai County
- Copperopolis, Arizona, a variant name for Chiapuk, Arizona
- Copperopolis, California, a census-designated place in Calaveras County
- Copperopolis (album), released in 1996 by Grant Lee Buffalo
- Swansea, Wales, once nicknamed "Copperopolis" for its copper production industry
- Queenstown, Tasmania, also nicknamed "Copperopolis" for its copper mining and smelting industry
