= Tecolote =

Tecolote may refer to:

- Tecolote, New Mexico, United States
- Tecolote (crater), a crater on Mars
- Tecolote Beach, a beach community in La Paz, Baja California Sur, Mexico
- Tecolote Barbudo, the bearded screech owl of Mexico
- Chukut Kuk, Arizona, also known as Tecolote

== See also ==
- Tecolotes de los Dos Laredos, a minor league baseball team, based in Nuevo Laredo, Tamaulipas, Mexico and Laredo, Texas, United States
- Tecolotito, New Mexico, a community in San Miguel County, New Mexico, United States
