= Corva =

Corva may refer to:

- Corva, Arizona, a populated place in the US
- Corva, a frazione in Azzano Decimo, north-eastern Italy
- Corva, a frazione in Porto Sant'Elpidio, central Italy
- Corva (grape), an Italian grape variety

== See also ==
- Giardino Botanico Alpino di Pietra Corva, a botanical garden in northern Italy
- Corvidae, the family of birds known as corvids
- Curva
