= Big Nose Kate =

Companion of Doc Holliday (1849–1940)

Mary Katherine Horony
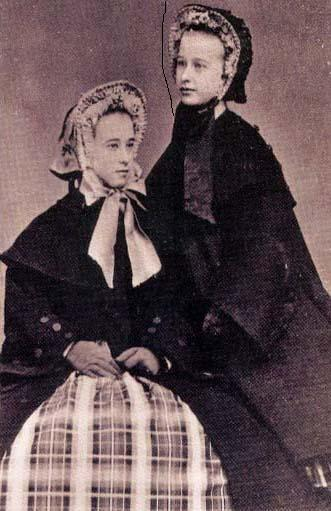
- Mary Katherine Horony (left) and younger sister Wilhelmina c. 1865, near the time they were orphaned. Mary Katherine is about 15 years old.
- Born: Mária Izabella Magdolna Horony; November 7, 1849; Érsekújvár, Kingdom of Hungary, Austrian Empire (presently Nové Zámky, Slovakia)
- Died: November 2, 1940 (aged 90); Prescott, Arizona, United States
- Other name: Kate Elder · Kate Fisher · Mary Cummings-Haroney
- Occupations: Prostitute; dance hall girl; boarding house owner; baker
- Spouse(s): Doc Holliday (common-law), George Cummings

Mary Katherine Horony Cummings (November 7, 1849 – November 2, 1940), popularly known as Big Nose Kate, was a Hungarian-born American outlaw, gambler, prostitute and longtime companion and common-law wife of Old West gambler and gunfighter Doc Holliday. "Tough, stubborn and fearless", she was educated, but chose to work as a prostitute due to the independence it provided her. She is the only woman with whom Holliday is known to have had a relationship.

== Early life ==
Mary Katherine Horony (also Harony (original family name from Hungary), Haroney, and Horoney) was born on November 7, 1849, in Érsekújvár, Kingdom of Hungary (present-day Nové Zámky, Slovakia). She was the second daughter of physician and teacher Mihály Horony (1817–1865) and his second wife Katalin Boldizsár (1830–1865).

=== Immigration to the United States ===
In 1860, Dr. Horony, his wife Katalin (Katharina) and children left Hungary for the United States, arriving in New York City on the German ship Bremen in September.

The Horony family settled in a predominantly German area of Davenport, Iowa, in 1862. Horony and his wife died within a month of one another in 1865. Mary Katherine and her younger siblings were placed in the home of her brother-in-law, Gustav Susemihl, and in 1870 they were left in the care of attorney Otto Smith. The 1870 United States Census records for Davenport show Horony's younger sister, 15-year-old Wilhelmina (Wilma), living with and working as a domestic for Austrian-born David Palter and his Hungarian wife Bettina.

=== St. Louis and Dodge City ===
In 1866, at age 16, Horony ran away from her foster home and stowed away on a riverboat bound for St. Louis, Missouri. Horony later claimed that while she lived in St. Louis she married a dentist named Silas Melvin with whom she had a son, and that both died of yellow fever. The United States Census records report that a Silas Melvin lived in St. Louis in the mid 1860s but that he was married to a steamship captain's daughter named Mary Bust. The census also shows that another Melvin was employed by a St. Louis asylum. Since Horony met Doc Holliday in the early 1870s, she may have confused the two and their occupations when recalling the facts later in her life.

Researcher Jan Collins states that Horony entered the Ursuline Convent but did not remain long. In 1869, she is recorded as working as a prostitute for madam Blanche Tribole in St. Louis. In 1874, Horony was fined for working as a "sporting woman", i.e. a prostitute, in a "sporting house" in Dodge City, Kansas, run by Nellie "Bessie" (Ketchum) Earp, James Earp's wife.

== Joins Doc Holliday ==
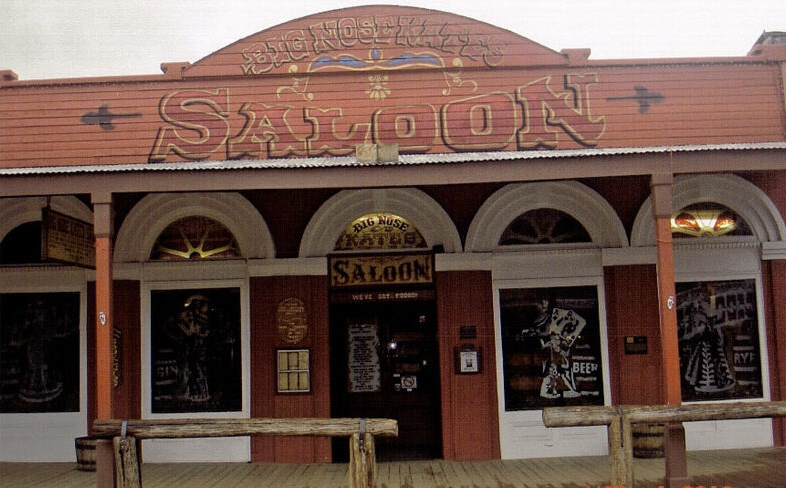
Horony's saloon in Tombstone originally called the "Grand Hotel" was built in 1880. The McLaury brothers stayed there the night before the gunfight at the O.K. Corral.

In 1876, Horony moved to Fort Griffin, Texas, where in 1877 she met Doc Holliday at John Shanssey's Saloon, where Holliday was dealing cards. According to his cousin and biographer Karen Holliday Tanner, Holliday considered Horony to be his intellectual equal, while she appreciated his refined manners. By this time, Horony had earned the nickname "Big Nose Kate". Horony was tough, stubborn, and with a temper that matched Holliday's.

=== Move to Dodge City ===
The couple's departure from Fort Griffin was dramatic. A card game between Holliday and a local bully by the name of Ed Bailey, led to a confrontation where Bailey kept sneaking a look at the discards, something that was prohibited by the rules of Western Poker. This violation could force the offending player to forfeit the pot. Holliday warned Bailey twice but was ignored. Bailey did it a third time, but this time Holliday raked in the pot without showing his hand or saying a word. Bailey immediately brought his revolver out from under the table. Before Bailey could fire, Holliday pulled a knife and slashed the man across the stomach, killing him.

Holliday maintained he acted in self-defense and was arrested and incarcerated in a local hotel room, there being no jail in the town. The killing incited some townsfolk to form a vigilante group to seek revenge on Holliday. Horony came to Holliday's aid by setting fire to an old shed to distract the mob. With the townsfolk redirected to fight the fire, Horony confronted the Deputy guarding Holliday with a gun and she and Holliday escaped into the night. After hiding out that night, they headed to Dodge City, Kansas on stolen horses, arriving the next morning at Deacon Cox's Boarding House. The two registered as Dr. and Mrs. J. H. Holliday.

Holliday opened a dental practice by day but spent most of his time gambling and drinking. The two fought regularly and sometimes violently, but made up after fights despite the volatile relationship.

According to Horony, the couple later married in Valdosta, Georgia. They traveled to Trinidad, Colorado, and then to Las Vegas, New Mexico, where they lived for about two years. Holliday worked as a dentist by day and ran a saloon on Center Street by night. Horony also occasionally worked at a dance hall in Santa Fe, New Mexico.

By her own account, Horony and Holliday met up again with Wyatt Earp and his brothers on their way to the Arizona Territory. Virgil Earp had already been in Prescott, Arizona, and persuaded his brothers to move to Tombstone. Holliday was making money at the gambling tables in Prescott. In 1880, he and Horony parted ways when Horony left for Globe, Arizona, but she rejoined Holliday soon after he arrived in Tombstone.

=== Move to Tombstone ===
Holliday, like his friend Wyatt Earp, was always looking for an opportunity to make money, and joined the Earps in Tombstone during the fall of 1880. On March 15, 1881, at 10:00 pm, three cowboys attempted to rob a Kinnear & Company stagecoach carrying $26,000 in silver bullion (by the inflation adjustment algorithm: $870,000 in today's dollars) near Benson, Arizona, during which the popular driver Eli "Budd" Philpot and passenger Peter Roerig were killed. Cochise County Cowboy Bill Leonard, a former watchmaker from New York City, was one of three men implicated in the robbery, and he and Holliday had become good friends. When Horony and Holliday had a fight, County Sheriff Johnny Behan and Milt Joyce, a county supervisor and owner of the Oriental Saloon, decided to exploit the situation. Both were members of the Tombstone Ten Percent Ring.

Behan and Joyce plied Horony with alcohol and suggested to her a way to get even with Holliday. She signed an affidavit implicating Holliday in the murders and attempted robbery. Judge Wells Spicer issued an arrest warrant for Holliday. The Earps found witnesses who could attest to Holliday's whereabouts elsewhere at the time of the murders. Horony said that Behan and Joyce had influenced her to sign a document she didn't understand. With the Cowboy plot revealed, Judge Spicer freed Holliday. The district attorney threw out the charges, labeling them "ridiculous". After Holliday was released, he gave Horony money and put her on the stage. Horony returned to Globe for a time, but she returned to Tombstone in October of that year.

=== Gunfight at the O.K. Corral ===
In a 1939 letter to her niece Lillian Rafferty, Horony claimed that she was in the Tombstone area with Holliday during the days before the shootout. According to Horony, she was with Holliday in Tucson, Arizona when they attended the San Augustin Feast and Fair in Levin Park during October 1881. On October 20, 1881, Morgan Earp rode to Tucson to request Holliday's assistance with dealing with Cochise County Cowboys who had threatened to kill the Earps. She wrote that Holliday asked her to remain in Tucson for her safety, but she refused, and traveled with Holliday and Earp. Horony reminisced in the letter about her stay with Holliday at C.S. Fly's Boarding House which bordered the alley where the Gunfight at the O.K. Corral took place.

Horony accurately described minor details of the shootout, writing that on the day of the gunfight a man entered Fly's Boarding House with a "bandaged head" and a rifle. He was looking for Holliday, who was still in bed after a night of gambling. Horony recalled that the man who was turned away by Mrs. Fly was later identified as Ike Clanton, whom city marshal Virgil Earp had pistol-whipped earlier that day when he found Clanton carrying a rifle and pistol in violation of city ordinances. Clanton's head was bandaged afterward.

Virgil Earp had disarmed him earlier that day and told Ike he would leave Ike's confiscated rifle and revolver at the Grand Hotel, which was favored by cowboys when they were in town. Ike testified afterward that he had tried to buy a new revolver at Spangenberger's gun and hardware store on 4th Street but the owner saw Ike's bandaged head and refused to sell him one. Clanton was unarmed at the time of the shootout later that afternoon. Ike testified that he picked up the weapons from William Soule, the jailer, a couple of days later.

Author Glenn Boyer disputes that Horony saw the gunfight through the window of the boarding house. Also according to him, Horony stated that after Doc Holliday returned to his room, he sat at the edge of his bed and wept from the shock of what had happened during the close-range gunfight. "That was awful," Horony claims he said. "Just awful." Boyer's work, however, has been rejected by serious scholars.

== After the O.K. Corral and later life ==
Horony is reported to have made trips to Tombstone to see Holliday until he left for Colorado in April 1882. In 1887, Horony traveled to Redstone, Colorado, close to Glenwood Springs, Colorado, to visit with her brother Alexander. Some historians have tried to connect Horony and Doc to possible reconciliation attempts between the two.

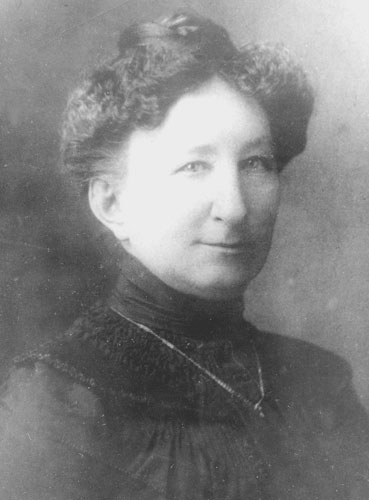
Big Nose Kate at 40

=== Marriage to George Cummings ===
After Doc Holliday died in 1887, Horony married Irish blacksmith George Cummings in Aspen, Colorado, on March 2, 1890. After working several mining camps throughout Colorado, they moved to Bisbee, Arizona, where she briefly ran a bakery. After returning to Willcox, Arizona, in Cochise County, Cummings became an abusive alcoholic and they separated. In 1900, Horony moved to Dos Cabezas or Cochise and worked for John and Lulu Rath, owners of the Cochise Hotel. George Cummings committed suicide in Courtland, Arizona, in July 1915.

Horony is enumerated in the 1910 U.S. Census in Dos Cabezas, Arizona, as a member of the home of miner John J. Howard. When Howard died in 1930, Horony was the executrix of his estate. She contacted his only daughter, who lived in Tempe, Arizona, and settled the inheritance.

In 1931 the 80-year-old Horony contacted her longtime friend, Arizona Governor George W. P. Hunt, and applied for admittance to the Arizona Pioneers' Home in Prescott, Arizona. The home had been established in 1910 by the State of Arizona for destitute and ailing miners and male pioneers of the Arizona Territory. It took Horony six months to be admitted because the home had a requirement that residents must be US citizens. According to the 1935 Bork interview, Horony was owed money by the Howard estate, but the amount owed was not enough to buy firewood through the winter, as Horony had complained in her letters to the governor.

She was admitted as one of the first female residents of the home. She lived there and became an outspoken resident, assisting other residents with living comforts. Horony wrote many letters to the Arizona state legislature, often contacting the governor when she was not satisfied with their response. Near the end of her life, several reporters tried to record Horony's life story, her relationship with Doc Holliday and her time in Tombstone. She only talked to Anton Mazzonovich and Prescott historian A.W. Bork.

== Death and discrepancies in records ==
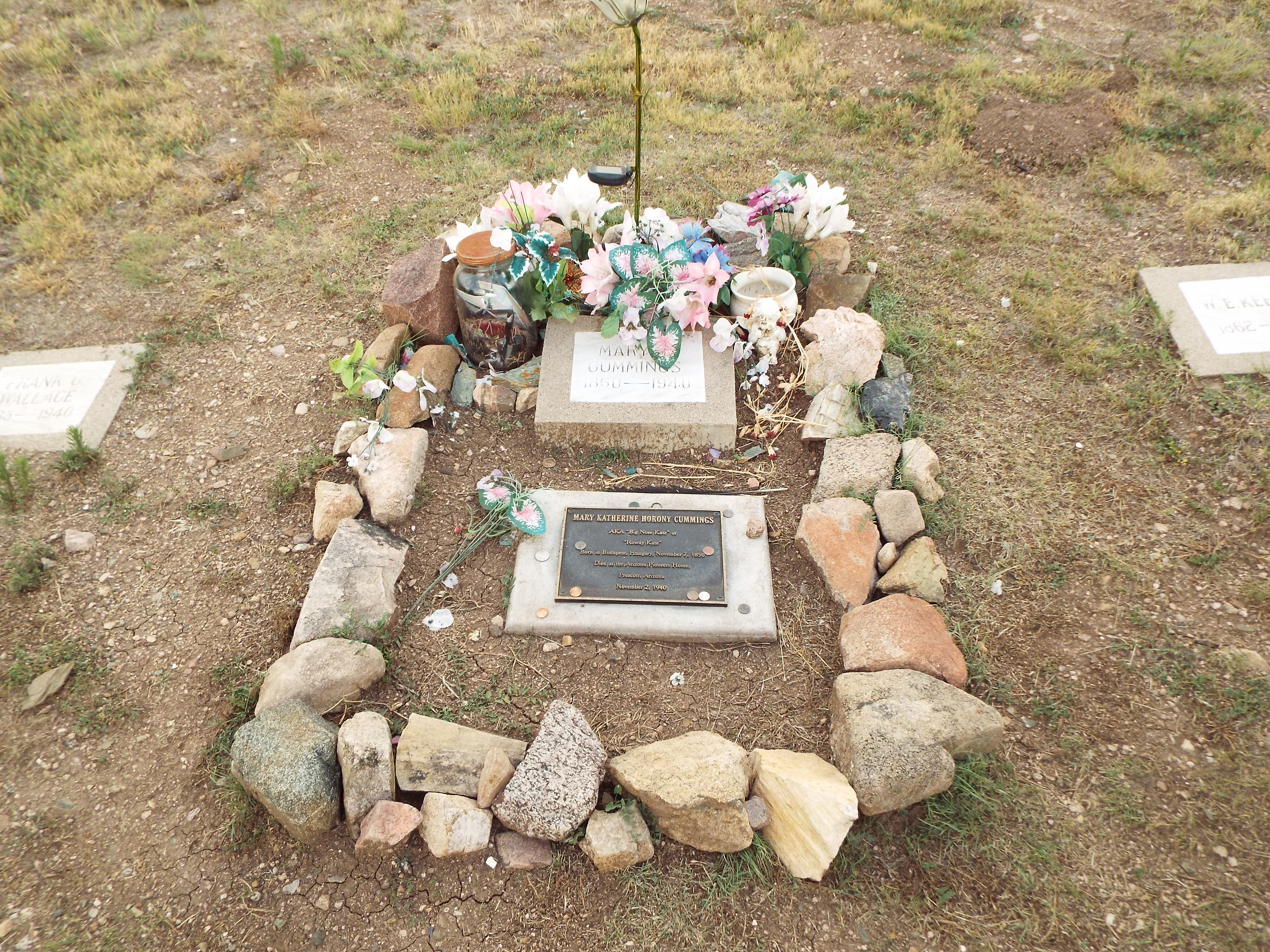
Horony's grave in Prescott, Arizona

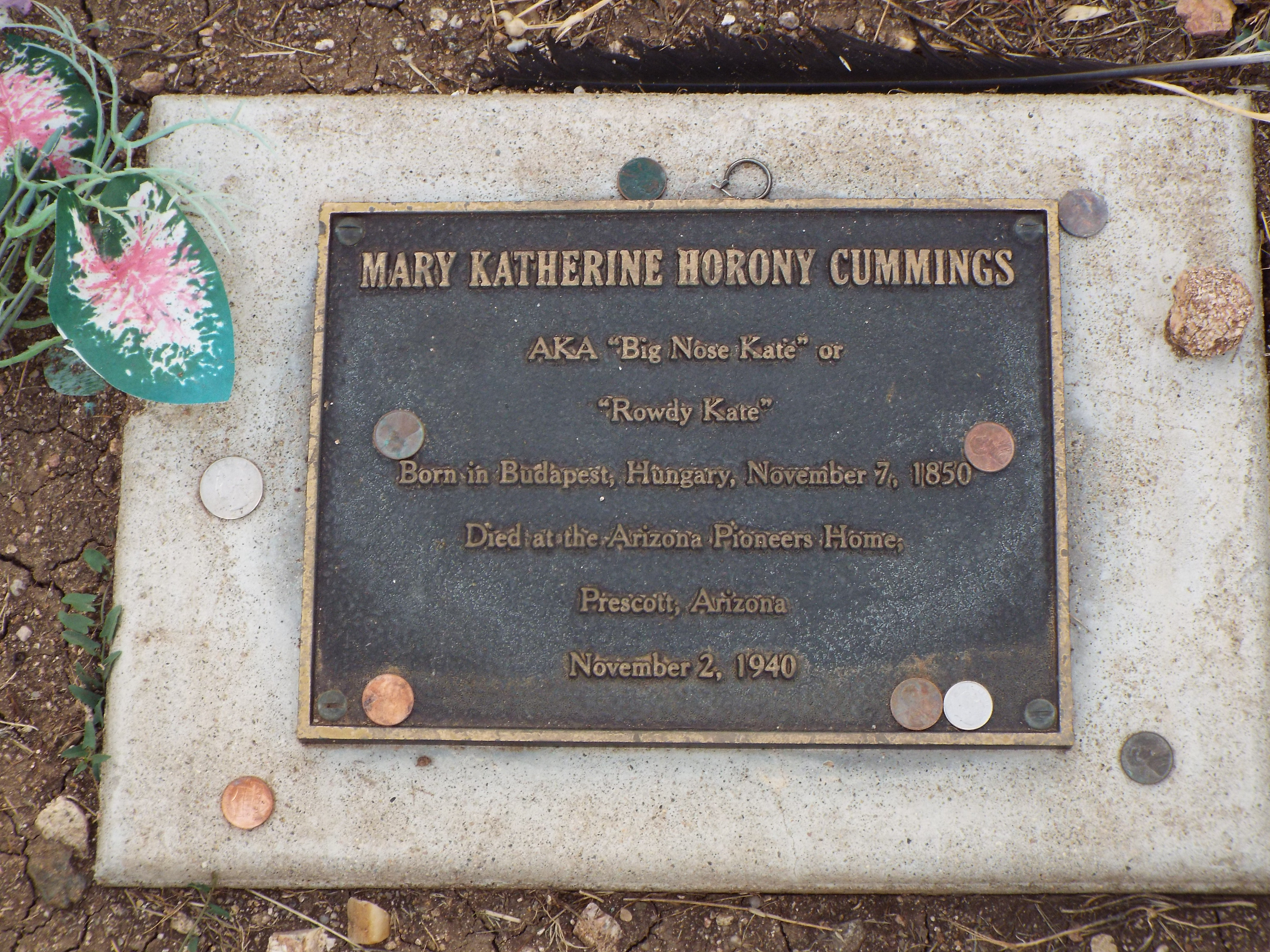
Horony's grave marker under the name Mary Cummings

Horony died on November 2, 1940, of acute myocardial insufficiency, a condition she started showing symptoms of the day before her death. Her death certificate states that she also suffered from coronary artery disease and advanced arteriosclerosis. Horony's death certificate contained significant discrepancies regarding her parents' names and her birthplace. Although she was born in Hungary, her death certificate states she was born in Davenport, Iowa, to father Marchal H. Michael and mother Catherine Baldwin. The birthplace of both her parents is shown on the certificate as "unknown". The superintendent of the Pioneer Home is named as the informant on the death certificate.

Horony was buried on November 6, 1940, in the Arizona Pioneers' Home Cemetery in Prescott, Arizona. An incorrect birth year of 1850 is on her grave markers.

== Cultural depictions ==
- Jo Van Fleet played Horony (as Kate Fisher) in Gunfight at the O.K. Corral (1957).
- Grace Lee Whitney played Horony (as Kate Fisher) in the 1964 Death Valley Days Television episode "The Quiet and the Fury." The episode covers the incident with Ed Bailey and Horony's rescue of Holliday.
- Horony was played by Faye Dunaway in the 1971 film Doc.
- In the 1993 film Tombstone, she was portrayed by Polish actress Joanna Pacuła.
- Horony was portrayed by Isabella Rossellini in the 1994 movie Wyatt Earp.
