= Glenn Boyer =

American writer (1924–2013)

Glenn G. Boyer
- Glenn Boyer
- Born: January 5, 1924; Wisconsin
- Died: February 14, 2013 (aged 89); Tucson, Arizona
- Occupations: Air Force officer; western author
- Known for: Author of numerous books and articles on the Earp family

Glenn G. Boyer (January 5, 1924 – February 14, 2013) was a controversial author who published three books and a number of articles about Wyatt Earp and related figures in the American Old West. He was the first person to reveal the existence of Wyatt Earp's second wife, Mattie Blaylock. His publications were for many years regarded as the authoritative source on Wyatt Earp's life. However, when other experts began to seek evidence supporting Boyer's work, he would or could not prove the existence of documents that he said he owned and had cited as essential sources. In one case, an individual he cited as a key source was exposed as a complete fabrication. His reputation and the authenticity of his work was seriously damaged. Although he retained many supporters, his work became surrounded by controversy. At least one critic wrote that all of Boyer's later work was "riddled with bogus material".

One of his books, I Married Wyatt Earp, sold more than 35,000 copies and was the second-best selling book about Wyatt Earp. After many disagreements with University of Arizona press, who initially published the book, Boyer regained rights to the book and had it published by Longmeadow Press as a non-fiction autobiography. Boyer published over more than 30 years a number of books and articles. He was responsible for publishing the memoirs of Doc Holliday's common-law wife Big Nose Kate, as well as the long-sought "Flood Manuscript" which had been written with Wyatt Earp's direct input.

== Personal life ==
Boyer, a native of Wisconsin, joined the U.S. Army Air Corps in 1943 and served in the U.S. Air Force until his retirement as a Lieutenant Colonel in 1965. During his time in the Air Force he conducted a statistical analysis of F-100 aircraft to help determine the cause of a high accident rate; the analysis found that the planes were being overused and recommended more downtime.

Boyer married author Jane Candia Coleman in 1980. He died on February 14, 2013, at age 89, in Tucson, Arizona. He was survived by his wife Jane, two sons and three grandchildren.

== Boyer collection ==
During his later years as an officer in the USAF, Boyer spent much of his personal time meeting with and interviewing surviving members of the Earp family. He interviewed a number of Wyatt’s relations including the Cason family, who had known Wyatt's common-law wife Josephine Earp as "Aunt Josie" in the 1930s. While serving in the U.S. Air Force in Ajo, Arizona, he met Albert Price Behan, Johnny Behan's son. Boyer accumulated 32 boxes of correspondence with the Earp family, family pictures, hand-written notes, audio recordings, weapons, and memorabilia, along with manuscripts that he used as source material for several books, including the memoir I Married Wyatt Earp, supposedly written by Wyatt Earp's wife, Josephine Earp.

Along with hundreds of letters and personal writings, the Earp family also gave Boyer "trunks full of personal items" and several firearms belonging to the Earp brothers and their father. On April 17, 2014, Glenn Boyer's family put much of his Earp collection and many artifacts up for auction. Among the 32 boxes of documentation, files, pictures and memorabilia for sale was a Colt .45 caliber said by Earp descendants to have been owned by Wyatt Earp. Also included in the auction was a Winchester lever-action shotgun belonging to Wyatt Earp.

The Wyatt revolver from Boyer's estate was expected to fetch from $100,000 to $150,000. On the day of the auction, more than 6,400 online bidders and over 400 collectors from 49 countries took part in the auction. The revolver attributed to Wyatt Earp was sold to an unnamed phone bidder from New Mexico for $225,000. The Winchester lever-action shotgun also said to be Wyatt Earp's sold for $50,000, below the high value estimate of $125,000.

In 2009, Boyer arranged with Legendary Publishing of Edmond, Oklahoma, the publishers of what would be his final book, Where the Heart Was, to have his VHS tapes converted to DVDs, and to have his research scanned and digitized, but no publication date was announced.

=== Cason manuscript ===
The facts about when Josephine Earp first arrived in the Arizona Territory, her life before and while living in Tombstone, and when she first began a relationship with Earp, have been obscured by her legal and personal efforts to keep that period private. After Earp's death, Josephine collaborated with two of her husband's cousins, Mabel Earp Cason and her sister Vinolia Earp Ackerman, to document her life.

The cousins recorded events in her later life, but they found Josephine was extremely evasive. In her conversations with the Earp cousins, Josephine was imprecise about the timing and nature of events during her early life in the Arizona Territory and Tombstone. Josephine apparently wanted to keep her and Wyatt's tarnished history during the Tombstone period private and to sanitize their life story of anything that could be seen negatively.

Wyatt's cousins pressed her for details about her personal life in Tombstone. She finally volunteered that she had returned to the Arizona Territory in 1881 and joined Johnny Behan in Tombstone because he had promised to marry her. She was disappointed and disillusioned when he repeatedly delayed the wedding. She was ready to leave him, but Behan persuaded her to remain. In her version of events, she said years later that she lived with a lawyer while working as a housekeeper for Behan and his ten-year-old son, Albert.

Boyer argued that she actually lived with Behan. Boyer warns readers of "her ‘little-old-lady’ attempts to tell only the decorous and proper." Along with her own past, Josephine was sensitive about what others might think if they learned about Wyatt's common-law wife, Mattie Blaylock. Blaylock suffered from severe headaches and was addicted to laudanum, an opiate-based pain reliever in common use at the time. After the Earp Vendetta Ride, she joined the rest of the Earp family in Colton, California where she expected Earp to call for her. When Wyatt failed to contact her, she returned to prostitution and later committed suicide. Wyatt may have still been living with Blaylock when Josephine and Wyatt began their relationship.

Cason says she and her sister "finally abandoned work on the manuscript because she [Josie] would not clear up the Tombstone sequence where it pertained to her and Wyatt." Other writers and researchers reported that Josephine was often "difficult" to interview.

After the publication of Boyer's book, An Illustrated Life of Doc Holliday in 1966, Wyatt Earp's grandniece Estelle Josephine Miller and her husband Bill Miller contacted Boyer. They were looking for a writer to write a book with a more balanced story about their uncle. Estelle Miller remembered Earp well. She said he "wasn't like them writers say." She insisted he was neither a Boy Scout nor a saint, but a "rough, tough, profane, rooting-tooting frontiersman."

Seeking more information, Boyer contacted Virgil Earp's granddaughter Mable Earp Cason only to learn she had died. Her daughter Jeanne Cason Laing cooperated with Boyer and sent Boyer a stack of material "almost a foot high", the result of three attempts by her mother and aunt to write a biography of Josephine Earp. This included material from the 1930s that Jeanne called the "Cason manuscript." Boyer interviewed her and other family members, gleaning details of Josephine's life, and received additional documents and photographs.

=== Clum manuscript ===
In addition to the Cason manuscript Josephine prepared with the help of the Earp cousins, Boyer claimed to possess the so-called Clum manuscript. He said it contained details of Wyatt and Josephine's life in Tombstone that were missing from the story she wrote with the Earp cousins. Boyer said that the Clum manuscript had been written by The Tombstone Epitaph publisher John Clum based on conversations with Josephine.

Boyer wrote in the epilogue to the 1976 edition of his book I Married Wyatt Earp, "The first Josephine Earp manuscript, the one prepared with the assistance of Parsons and Clum, had been made available to me earlier by Mrs. Charles [Esther] Colyn, an Earp researcher, collector and genealogist of the first magnitude. Upon her death in 1973, this Earp relative by marriage bequeathed me her whole research collection to perpetuate. Without her generous assistance over the years, I would not have attempted to construct this book. The Cason manuscript alone simply lacked the necessary detail on Tombstone; it was essential to couple it with the earlier, more frank manuscript, before a complete narrative could be achieved."

Esther Colyn wrote Glenn Boyer on December 9, 1965, as reprinted in The Suppressed Murder of Wyatt Earp published in 1976... "I never had a real manuscript which could be called such."

A year after I Married Wyatt Earp was published in 1977, Boyer published a pamphlet, Trailing an American Myth, in which he stated that the Clum manuscript was actually written by several authors. He wrote that their work formed "the basis of the Tombstone years in I Married Wyatt Earp and "the Ten Eyck Papers in Wyatt Earp's Tombstone Vendetta."

Also in 1977, Boyer wrote and published another pamphlet, "Who Killed John Ringo?" It stated that fiction writers Dashiell Hammett, Wilson Mizner, Rex Beach and Walt Coburn had written a portion of the manuscript documenting Josephine' Tombstone years.

When questioned about the origins of the Clum manuscript during the early 1980s, Boyer changed his story to say that he did not receive the Clum manuscript from Colyn after all, instead it was given to him by one of Earp's nieces, Jeanne Cason Laing. When asked if these were all the same manuscript, Boyer replied, "Some of them are a manuscript. Some are only a mishmash, as a matter of fact... The earlier ones of those guys all lean heavily on Clum and Parsons for insights, which is one of the reasons they got in trouble with Josephine Earp... This is a broad way when I say I refer to a Clum manuscript, for example. It is a broad way of referring to something when really this is nobody's business in a way." He said the documents contributed "to the overall fabric of Josie's story were undoubtedly made by former Tombstone mayor and Earp friend John Clum," but that "some Earp researchers got hung up on this 'manuscript' business."

Boyer said that the Clum manuscript could be found in the University of Arizona archives but they could not produce it. Boyer finally admitted that he no longer had the Clum manuscript and could not locate it. When asked by a reporter in 1998 if the Clum manuscript was real, Boyer replied, "Why am I compelled to tell the truth about a manuscript like that that is worth a lot of money?" Boyer continues. "I may have it and I may not. That's none of your business." When asked if the Clum manuscript was a compilation of sources, he said, "You bet your ass." "The Clum manuscript is a generic term and I've said it over and over."

Student-reporter Ryan Gabrielson from the University of Arizona Wildcat interviewed Boyer. He told Gabrielson, "The Clum manuscript is a generic term." "This—in addition (to other source materials)—was supported by literally hundreds, maybe thousands of letters and documents." Reporter Tony Ortega concluded that Boyer's varied descriptions of the manuscript, its origins, and its eventual disposition are "so contradictory that they aren't credible."

== Publications ==
Boyer began researching Wyatt Earp after retiring from the Air Force in 1965. He developed a relationship with Jeanne Cason Laing, the granddaughter of Virgil Earp. She supplied him with source material for a considerable portion of what he wrote. His research resulted in three primary books: The Suppressed Murder of Wyatt Earp, Wyatt Earp's Tombstone Vendetta, and I Married Wyatt Earp, and many other articles. His Earp publications came under increased scrutiny and criticism during and after 1990, and he was the focus of considerable controversy.

Jeff Morey, one of the most respected Earp researcher and writer, was the first to publicly question Boyer's credibility. In 1994, he wrote an essay titled "The Curious Vendetta of Glenn G. Boyer" published by the Western Outlaw-Lawman History Association.

In 1998, three more articles were published that completely undermined his credibility. The first was an article by Gary L. Roberts "Trailing an American Mythmaker: History and Glenn G. Boyer’s Tombstone Vendetta," published by the same association. This was followed by two articles written by Tony Ortega of the Phoenix New Times: "How the West was Spun" in December 1998 and "I Varied Wyatt Earp" in March 1999. Allen Barra, author of Inventing Wyatt Earp, wrote that after Boyer's book The Suppressed Murder of Wyatt Earp, all of his later work was "riddled with bogus material."

=== Life of Doc Holliday ===
One of Boyer's first books, The Illustrated Life of Doc Holliday, was initially published in 1966 as a "crime novel." When a reader many years later questioned him about the truthfulness of the work, Boyer told her that it was a hoax and a satire he wrote to purposefully trap careless researchers. Boyer included pictures of Old Western individuals that turned out to be images of his family. Boyer wrote, "It had no other purpose but to set afoot an experiment that would expose these people conclusively for the type of hypocritical goddam history-faking they were doing. And it worked."

=== Suppressed Murder of Wyatt Earp ===
This book, which Boyer wrote to describe how other writers had “murdered” the factual details of Wyatt’s life and personality, was widely admired for the apparent volume of research. In the book, he revealed for first time the existence of Wyatt Earp's second wife, Mattie Blaylock, and her suicide, along with information that supported Frank Waters' view that Wyatt had abandoned her. He also portrayed Wyatt Earp in a positive light without succumbing to hero worship.

=== I Married Wyatt Earp ===
Cover of the University of Arizona Press edition

The University of Arizona Press first published the book in 1976 under the title I Married Wyatt Earp: The Recollections of Josephine Sarah Marcus. The copyright was issued in her name and her name was given as the author. A book published by a university press must be non-fiction. When it is sold as non-fiction, academics and knowledgeable non-academics consider the university's approval sacrosanct. He became recognized as an expert on Wyatt Earp,

Boyer's book gained wide acceptance as a memoir written by Josephine and an accurate portrayal of her life with Wyatt Earp. The book was immensely popular for many years, capturing the imagination of people with an interest in western history, studied in classrooms, cited by scholars, and relied upon as factual by filmmakers. It became the university's fourth all-time best-selling book with 12 printings totaling more than 35,000 copies. Boyer in turn received wide recognition as the foremost authority on Wyatt Earp.

Boyer was asked to produce a copy of a key source document, the so-called "Clum manuscript", but he replied that the document had been lost and found and lost again. He concluded: "It is alive and well. In my head." He blamed the University of Arizona for his having invented the Clum manuscript. "They forced me to go back to something a little more nebulous in order to get published. I have never promoted myself as a historian. So I put words in Josephine's mouth. So what? Stuart Lake did it. I admit to making it interesting enough to be read, which it appears to be alleged is unethical."

When confronted with allegations that I Married Wyatt Earp was a hoax, Boyer said he had been misunderstood. "My work is beginning to be recognized by all but a few fanatics and their puppets as a classic example of the newly recognized genre 'creative non-fiction.'"

It was described by the Annual Review of Information Science and Technology in 2006 as a "creative exercise" and hoax. Some rival authors have said that the book cannot be relied on.

As a result of the criticism and faults discovered with the book, in early 2000 the University refused to comment about the book and referred all questions to university lawyers. On January 29, 2000, Boyer posted a note on Amazon.com that he intended to take back the rights to the book. In March the University of Arizona Press announced they had released all rights to the book, removed the book from their catalog, and returned unsold copies to Boyer. The university stated that they take their scholarly review process more seriously now than when the book was first published.

Boyer claimed he decided to drop publication because he was disappointed with the university's handling of movie rights. Boyer found a small publisher in Hawaii, shortened the title to I Married Wyatt Earp, and shifted authorship to his own name.

=== Wyatt Earp's Tombstone Vendetta ===
In an interview with the Phoenix New Times, Bob Palmquist, an attorney and avid Earp researcher, said he worked with Boyer for many years. He said that he read a portion of Boyer's manuscript for Wyatt Earp's Tombstone Vendetta in 1977. "And at that time he [Boyer] was saying it was a novel in the style of George McDonald Frasers The Flashman Papers." "The idea was to write a novel in the style of a memoir as if somebody was actually telling the story, in this case Ted Ten Eyck," Palmquist says. In a 1977 letter to Earp researcher Robert Mullin, Boyer told a very different story about Ten Eyck. Boyer wrote that he had received a new manuscript from Earp family members, "allegedly by one Teodore [sic] Ten Eyck, a name I can find nowhere else in Earpiana." Boyer claimed that the manuscript was "clearly authentic" and that it contained "fascinating revelations (if they are true) and would make an ace movie."

In the foreword to the book, Boyer wrote that his book is written in the form of a "non-fiction novel", and that he had invented a character named Ten Eyck to protect the newsman's family, who asked that he not be named. In an interview with Wild West Magazine, Boyer defended his use of a invented character in the book. "I was more than slightly amused that some in the Earp field were shocked and aghast that I used a literary device to tell the story." "Your average high school kid could figure out that the character (Ten Eyck) was a storytelling device. Even the most howling of my critics would grant that I am not stupid. Ergo, it stands to reason that if I used a figure that was not historically present in Tombstone during that period, something less than a genius could pick up on that—or so I thought."

As critics grew more specific in their questions and challenged his work, Boyer's description of Ten Eyck varied widely. He called the book a memoirs of a journalist, Ted Ten Eyck, who was present in Tombstone while the Earps were lawmen. In the book, Ten Eyck worked for the New York Herald in 1881, but his name is not found in any of the paper's 1881-82 editions. While positioned by Boyer as a non-fiction novel, it contains errors that cannot be resolved if the author is a real person. In the book, Ten Eyck identified Budd Philpot's hometown as "Halistoga", which Boyer identified as a misprint. In a footnote, he noted that the town's actual name was "Calistoga". In a story about Philpot published in The Tombstone Epitaph, Philpot's home is "Calistoga", although the 'C' is very faint. In 1951, Douglas Martin reprinted editions of the newspaper from that period, in which the indistinct 'C' is turned into 'H'. Boyer said Ten Eyck died in 1946, causing researchers to wonder how he could replicate this error before it had been made.

One critic described Wyatt Earp's Tombstone Vendetta, as "a book so bizarre it stands as emblematic of all that is troublesome in Earp literature." The doubts raised by Wyatt Earp's Tombstone Vendetta seriously damaged his credibility.

Jeanne Cason Laing, the woman who, years earlier, had given Boyer the Cason manuscript, was troubled by assertions that Ten Eyck was with Josephine when she died. She says Boyer tried to convince her that Ten Eyck was real and that Laing had known him. "Vendetta is full of lies. It's not like [Josephine] at all," she says.

=== Later publications ===
During the 1980s, he published several more novels, including, Winchester Affidavit set in New Mexico that fictionalized late 19th-century events there. Boyer also published several articles in Arizona Highways. During the 1990s Boyer wrote the Morgette fictional series based around a man named Dorn set in the Old West. He also published a fictional book “Custer, Terry and Me.” about Gen. George Armstrong Custer. His last book, in 2009 Where the Heart Was, was a fictional semi-autobiography loosely based on his own family and childhood growing up rural Wisconsin.

== Support and criticism ==
Boyer inspired both extremely loyal supporters and a number of critics. Ben Traywick, author of Chronicles of Tombstone, John Henry—The Doc Holliday Story, and other works, and formerly Tombstone, Arizona's official volunteer Town Historian, said “Boyer was a giant in the field of Earp history, nobody could touch him.” He was described by others as "opinionated, cantankerous, interesting and funny as hell."

Boyer was very choosy about who he allowed to view his library and files, occasionally providing authors like Ben Traywick and Lee Silva with access. He also invited Scott Dyke, a retired Wall Street broker, businessman, banker, and researcher who moved to southern Arizona, to help organize his materials. Dyke spent nine years and thousands of hours collating and organizing Boyer's files. He said Boyer's "collection of files, pictures and tapes, both audio and visual, is staggering in volume." Boyer collected a large portion of his documentation from Earp family members, many of whom he personally knew.

Dyke said the records documented Boyer's ongoing contact with Earp relatives and genealogists for more than 60 years. Among his files was a mass of papers given to Boyer by Esther Colyn, a genealogist who had researched the Earp family. The records included the recollections of the Miller family who also gave Boyer a number of Wyatt's personal effects. Dyke said that Boyer gave him permission to view both the Flood manuscript, dictated by Wyatt Earp, and Josie's story as told to the Earp cousins, known as the Cason manuscript. Dyke learned that Boyer had gained an oral history from Earp relatives who had known Wyatt, which Boyer relied in part for some of his work. But Boyer limited what Dyke could say about the collection, and Dyke said that Boyer told him that parts of his collection "grew legs and took a hike." Although Dyke is more familiar with Boyer's archive than anyone, he wouldn't characterize Boyer's books as accurate, factual accounts of Earp's life. "Maybe he wrote his opinion in his books and stretched reality, but he didn't make up the research."

Boyer donated copies of the Flood and Cason manuscripts and other documents to the Ford County Historical Society, including an original journal kept by Josephine Earp, Wyatt's wife, with the condition that he would approve who could see the documents.

=== Refuses access to critics ===
In the 1990s, other authors and academics began to ask questions about his sources. Despite the wealth of information contained in his archives, Boyer uniformly declined to allow critics access to his repository. He promised Gary Roberts and Casey Tefertiller, two vocal critics of Boyer's work, access to his archives, but when they visited him in person, he reneged on his agreement.

=== Condemns critics ===
Boyer was often contemptuous of his critics, calling them "homosexuals", "fanatics and their puppets", among other things. He teased that he wouldn't reveal his sources just because he didn't like the individuals who questioned his truthfulness. "I am sorry that I ever wrote a fucking word about Wyatt Earp," he told a reporter. "I will never do such a goddam [sic] act of generosity for the public again. They killed the goose that laid the golden egg." "I do not have to give a shit about young historians, middle-aged historians, old historians, dead historians or historians who are not yet born," says Boyer. "This is my fucking perspective. I happen to be a literary artist performing."

When author Ann Kirschner, Dean of William E. Macaulay Honors College of The City University of New York, decided to write a book about Josephine Earp, she paid a visit to Boyer. She wrote that she had hundreds of stories about Boyer. "He was a hero, a villain, a thief, a scholar, a scamp. Or maybe all of the above." She met with him about a dozen times over three years. In their first interview, he wanted to know if she was "one of those 'libbers'", which he defined as "A woman seeking on a public platform the sexual satisfaction that has eluded her everywhere else." He wondered aloud to her about “why so many apparent homosexuals were drawn to Wyatt Earp...I wondered if they deplored their own place in society and in fact their biological propensity and were seeking an ultra male identity with Wyatt Earp." She remembers him stating that the group “Friends of Tombstone” should be renamed “Faggots on Tour.”

=== Effect on research ===
Jack Burrows, who wrote John Ringo, The Gunfighter Who Never Was, said, “How can he just take a stack of material and give it a name that has nothing to do with what’s included? You can take a cowpie and call it filet mignon, but somebody’s going to catch on during dinner. This is just gobbledygook.”

Gary Roberts, Professor Emeritus of History of Abraham Baldwin College in Tifton, Georgia, and the author of seventy-five articles on Western history, said, "By passing off his opinions and interpretations as primary sources, he has poisoned the record in a way that may take decades to clear." He said that Boyer's work "poisons the debate about Wyatt Earp, and until Boyer's sources can be authenticated, the interpretations based on them cannot even be addressed." Roberts commented, "The tragedy is that even if [Glenn Boyer] has found the truth, it is so buried in a crazy quilt of obfuscation and deceit that serious researchers will not believe it... He has succeeded in becoming a part of the Earp saga that cannot be ignored. But at what cost to history?"

== Estate sale ==
On April 17, 2014, Boyer's family put much of his Earp collection and many artifacts up for auction. Among the 32 boxes of documentation, files, pictures and memorabilia for sale were three pistols and a Winchester lever-action shotgun. One of the pistols is a Colt revolver once owned by Virgil Earp, a Remington Ball and Cap Revolver owned by Earp's grandfather, and a Colt .45-caliber Earp descendants said had been owned by Wyatt Earp. The shotgun was also reported to be Wyatt Earp's. Personal items of Josephine Earp's in the auction include her riding crop, opera glasses and jewelry.

The history of the items is controversial because they belonged to Boyer. John Boessenecker, an author of numerous articles on the American Old West and a collector of American Old West guns and memorabilia, said that it would be "impossible to separate the authenticity of the auction items from Boyer's own troubled history." This is particularly true because the provenance of the weapons is based on letters written by or given to Boyer.

Bill Miller, a nephew by marriage to Wyatt Earp, wrote in a letter to Boyer that he received two of the pistols and the shotgun from Allie Earp, Virgil's wife. Casey Tefertiller, a long-time critic of Boyer's work, commented on the auction. "How do you trust material you're buying from somebody caught fabricating evidence? He was the most charismatic, charming person I have ever met. But people wound up paying for it by buying into a hoax."

The revolver, said to have been carried by Wyatt Earp in Tombstone, has had the grips, barrel, and cylinder replaced. Only the frame is original, and it is missing a serial number. But X-ray testing revealed an original serial number that matched records confirming Earp had owned the gun. Before his death, Boyer completed a sworn affidavit attesting that the Colt .45 belonged to Earp. The affidavit is included with the revolver along with other expert findings. LeRoy Merz is the owner of Merz Antique Firearms, the nation's largest dealer in antique Winchesters in the United States. Despite Boyer's affidavit, he said the missing serial number is a "kiss of death," he says. "No serious collector will want that."

Prior to the auction, the Wyatt revolver was expected to fetch from $100,000 and $150,000. On the day of the auction, more than 6,400 online bidders and over 400 collectors from 49 countries took part in the auction. The revolver attributed to Wyatt Earp was sold to an unnamed phone bidder from New Mexico for $225,000. The Winchester lever-action shotgun also said to be Wyatt Earp's sold for $50,000, below the high value estimate of $125,000, and the Colt revolver that belonged to Virgil Earp sold for $37,500. John Anderson, a local businessman, was the winning bidder at $160,000 of the pistol owned by Virgil and his grandfather, the shotgun owned by Wyatt, and the 32 boxes of historical research. He refused to bid on the Colt that was reported to belong to Wyatt Earp. “Was it the one from the O.K. Corral? I don’t believe it was …,” he said. Anderson said he is looking for an accredited museum to house the weapons, and that he would donate the research to the University of Arizona. Boyer's widow, Jane Coleman, said, "Glenn would hate that."

== Published works ==
Boyer, Glenn G. (1966). Illustrated Life of Doc Holliday. Reminder Publishing Co. ASIN B004BWXQAO. (non-fiction)
Boyer, Glenn G. (1967). Suppressed Murder of Wyatt Earp. The Naylor Company. ISBN 1890670073. (non-fiction)
Boyer, Glenn G., ed. (1976). I Married Wyatt Earp: the Recollections of Josephine Sarah Marcus Earp (Fifth ed.). Tucson, Ariz.: University of Arizona Press. ISBN 0816504849. (historical fiction)
Boyer, Glenn G. (1982). The Guns of Morgette. New York: Dorchester Pub. Co. ISBN 0843948361. (fiction)
Boyer, Glenn G. (1983). Morgette in the Yukon. Walker Pub. Co. ISBN 0802740200. (fiction)
Boyer, Glenn G. (1984). Morgette on the Barbary Coast. New York: Dorchester Pub. Co. ISBN 0843949252. (fiction)
Boyer, Glenn G. (1986). Dorn. Walker & Co. ISBN 0802740561. (fiction)
Boyer, Glenn G. (1987). Morgette and the Alaskan Bandits. Walker Pub. Co. ISBN 0802709729. (fiction)
Boyer, Glenn G. (1985). Return of Morgette. Walker Pub. Co. ISBN 0802740499. (fiction)
Boyer, Glenn G., ed. (1993). Wyatt Earp's Tombstone Vendetta (hard cover limited ed.). Honolulu, HI.: Talei Publishers. ISBN 0963177222. (non-fiction)
Boyer, Glenn G. (1994). I Married Wyatt Earp: the Recollections of Josephine Sarah Marcus Earp (Fifth ed.). Longmeadow Press. ISBN 0681100850. (historical fiction)
Boyer, Glenn G. (1999). The Earp Curse. Historical Research Associates, Inc. ISBN 1890670138. (non-fiction)
Boyer, Glenn G. (2002). Winchester Affidavit (First ed.). New York City: Dorchester Pub. Co. ISBN 0843950668. (fiction)
Boyer, Glenn G. (2003). Morgette and the Shadow Bomber (First ed.). Waterville, MA.: Five Star. ISBN 0786237910. (fiction)
Boyer, Glenn G. (2004). Custer, Terry, and me: a Western Story (First ed.). Waterville, Me.: Five Star. ISBN 1594140316. (fiction)
Pelham, John (pseud.) (2005). Six Ring in a Small Town. Ravenhawk Books. ISBN 1893660001. (fiction)
Boyer, Glenn G. (2007). Wyatt Earp, Family, Friends & Foes, Volume I, Who Was Big Nose Kate? (Paperback ed.). Historical Research Associates. ASIN B001UDHKY0.
Boyer, Glenn G. (2009). Where the Heart Was (First ed.). Legendary Publishing. ISBN 978-1887747400. (semi-autobiography)
