= Cochise Hotel =

- U.S. National Register of Historic Places
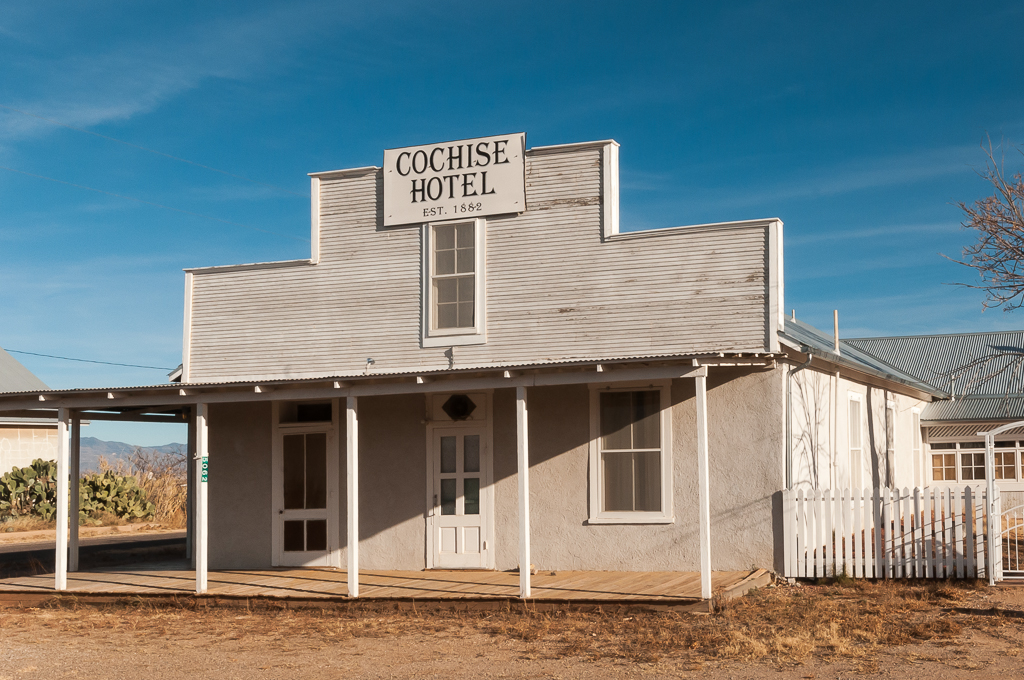
- The Cochise Hotel in 2013.

- Location within Arizona Location within the United States
- Location: Off U.S. 191 in Cochise, Arizona
- Coordinates: 32°6′17.36″N 109°55′19.64″W
- Built: 1882
- Architectural style: False front
- NRHP reference No.: 76000370
- Added to NRHP: October 22, 1976

The Cochise Hotel is a historic and functional hotel located in the town of Cochise in southeastern Arizona. The hotel was listed on the National Register of Historic Places on October 22, 1976.

== History ==
The hotel was originally built in 1882 by the railroad telegrapher and father of the town of Cochise, John Rath. The hotel has been in operation since then and is still open and currently being restored. The hotel was built with the purpose of serving railroad crews traveling through the town. The railroad depot, now gone, was located directly across the street.

After its opening in 1882, Rath and the Cochise Hotel served many purposes for the local community. These purposes included serving as the Wells Fargo office, the telegraph office, the community laundry and the local post office beginning in 1896. In 1899, Big Nose Kate, Mary Katherine Harony Cummings, the famed sidekick of John Henry Holliday aka Doc Holliday, was hired to work in the hotel after Holliday's death.

== See also ==
- Cochise County, Arizona
- List of Registered Historic Places in Arizona
