= Chiulikam, Arizona =

- Populated place
- Location within Arizona Location within the United States
- Coordinates: 32°34′28″N 112°31′34″W
- Country: United States
- State: Arizona
- County: Maricopa
- Elevation: 2,136 ft (651 m)
- Time zone: UTC-7 (Mountain (MST))
  - Summer (DST): UTC-7 (MST)
- Area code: 520
- FIPS code: 04-12885
- GNIS feature ID: 24366

Chiulikam is a populated place situated on the Tohono Oʼodham Nation in Maricopa County, Arizona, United States. It has numerous other unofficial names by which it is known, which include: Chiuli, Salcilla, Sauceda Well, Suwuki Vaya, Tschiulikam, and Vokivaxia. It has an estimated elevation of 2,136 feet (651 m) above sea level.
