= Chuwut Murk, Arizona =

- Populated place
- Location within the state of Arizona Chuwut Murk, Arizona (the United States)
- Coordinates: 31°53′14″N 112°08′44″W
- Country: United States
- State: Arizona
- County: Pima
- Elevation: 1,900 ft (579 m)
- Time zone: UTC-7 (Mountain (MST))
  - Summer (DST): UTC-7 (MST)
- Area code: 520
- FIPS code: 04-13370
- GNIS feature ID: 2919

Chuwut Murk is a populated place situated in Pima County, Arizona, United States. It has an estimated elevation of 1,900 feet (580 m) above sea level.
