= Cochise, Arizona =

Unincorporated community in Cochise County

- Unincorporated community
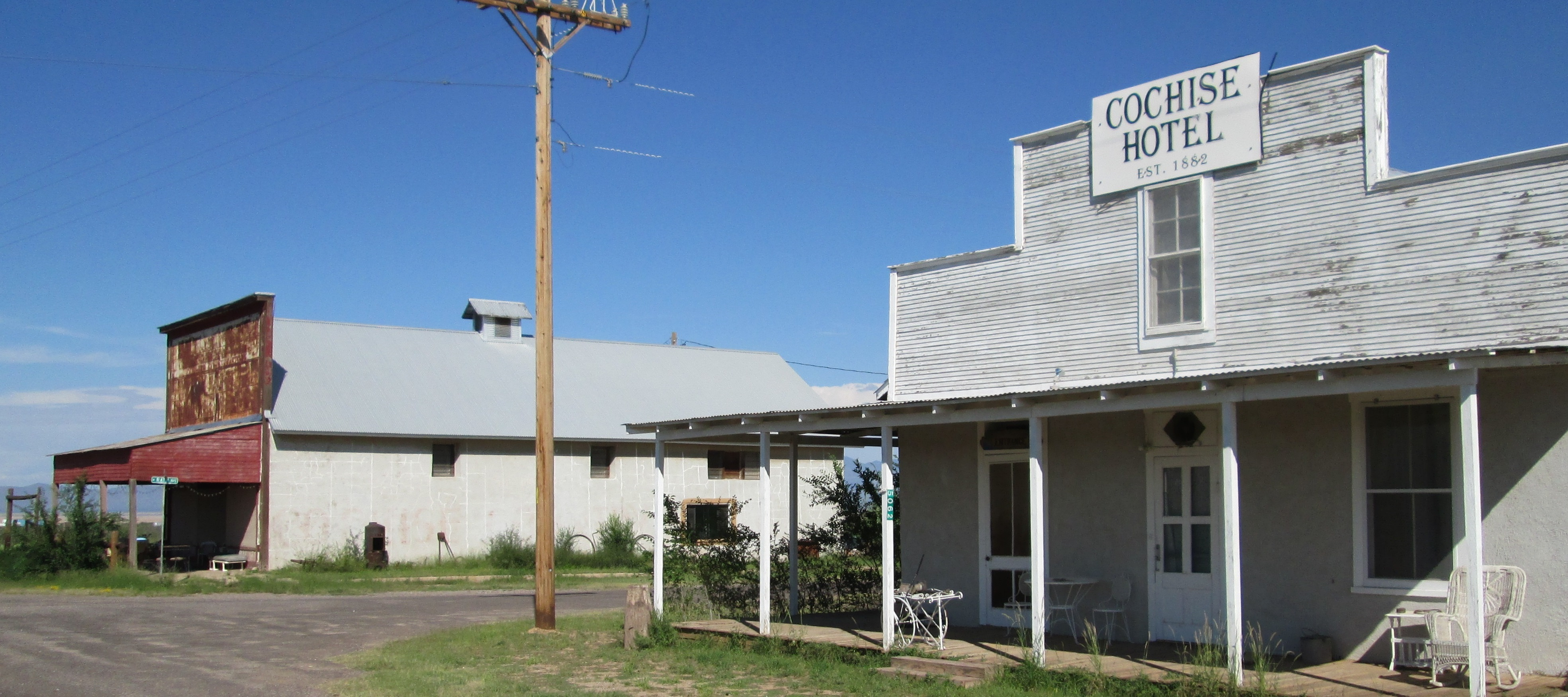
- Cochise in 2014.

- Location within Arizona Location within the United States
- Coordinates: 32°06′49″N 109°55′18″W
- Country: United States
- State: Arizona
- County: Cochise
- Elevation: 4,222 ft (1,287 m)
- Time zone: UTC-7 (MST (no DST))
- ZIP code: 85606
- Area code: 520
- GNIS feature ID: 3069

Cochise is an unincorporated community located in Cochise County, Arizona, United States. The city was created alongside the Southern Pacific Railroad in the 1880s. The city was primarily a stop for coal and water which were needed for trains at the time. At its peak, the town had a population of approximately 3,000 people. Today, only 50 people still live in Cochise. The town is also home to several historic locations. In 1899, Big Nose Kate, the famed sidekick of Doc Holliday, lived in Cochise while she was working at the Cochise Hotel after Holliday's death.

Cochise has the ZIP Code of 85606; according to the 2020–2024 American Community Survey 5-year estimates, ZIP Code Tabulation Area (ZCTA) 85606 had a population of 1,066.

== Climate ==
According to the Köppen Climate Classification system, Cochise has a semi-arid climate, abbreviated "BSk" on climate maps.

== Photo gallery ==
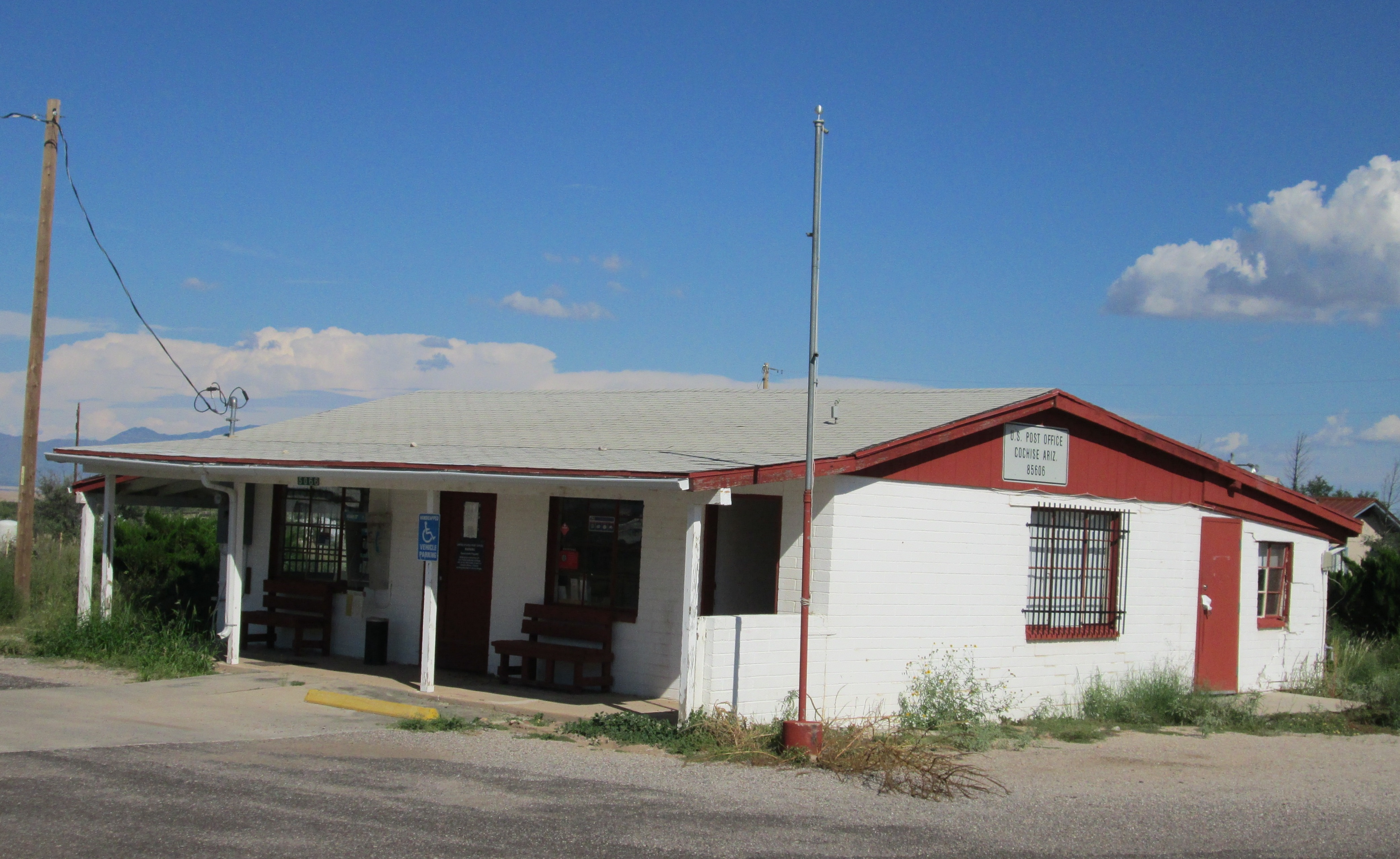
The post office.

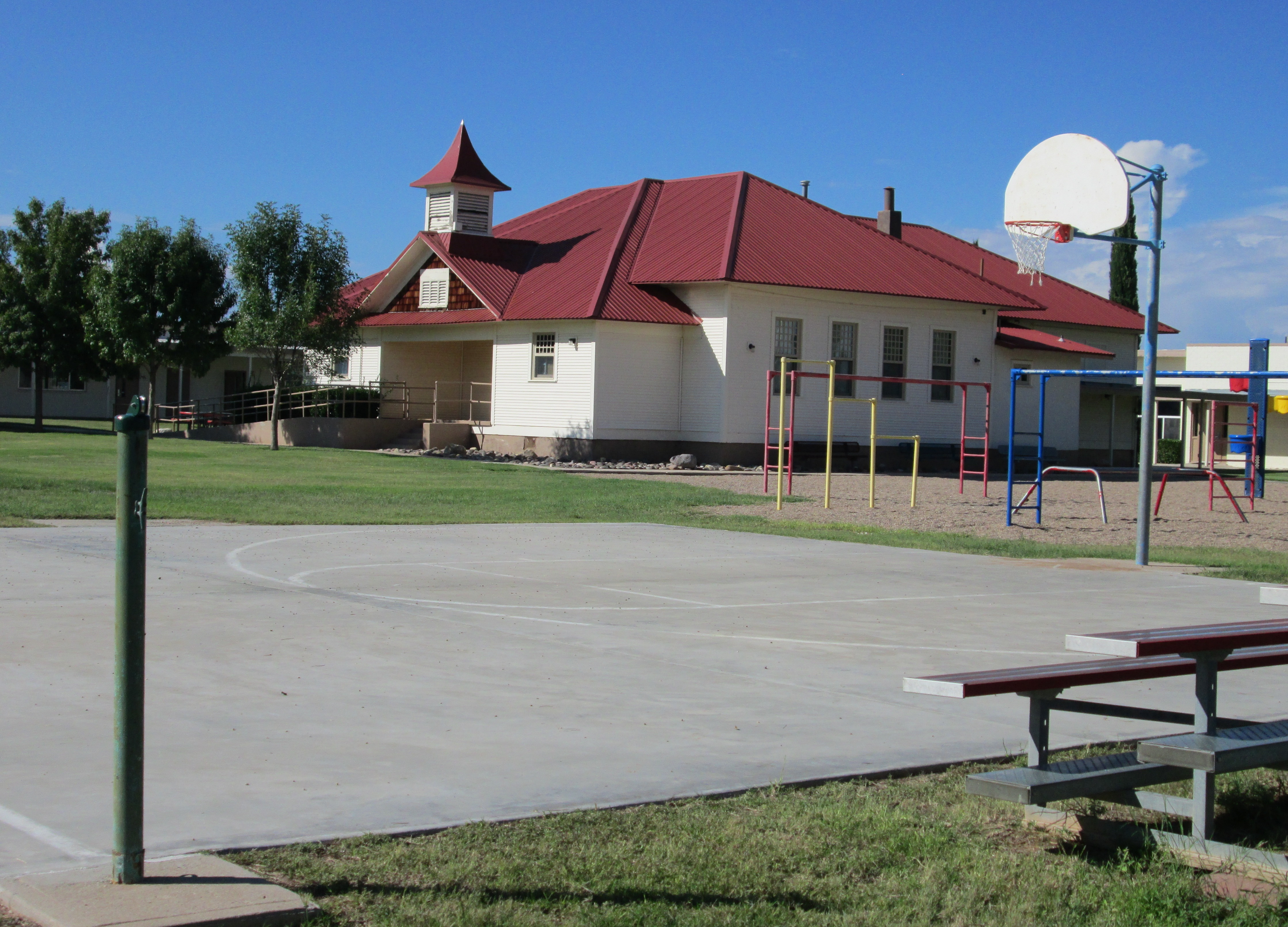
Schoolhouse

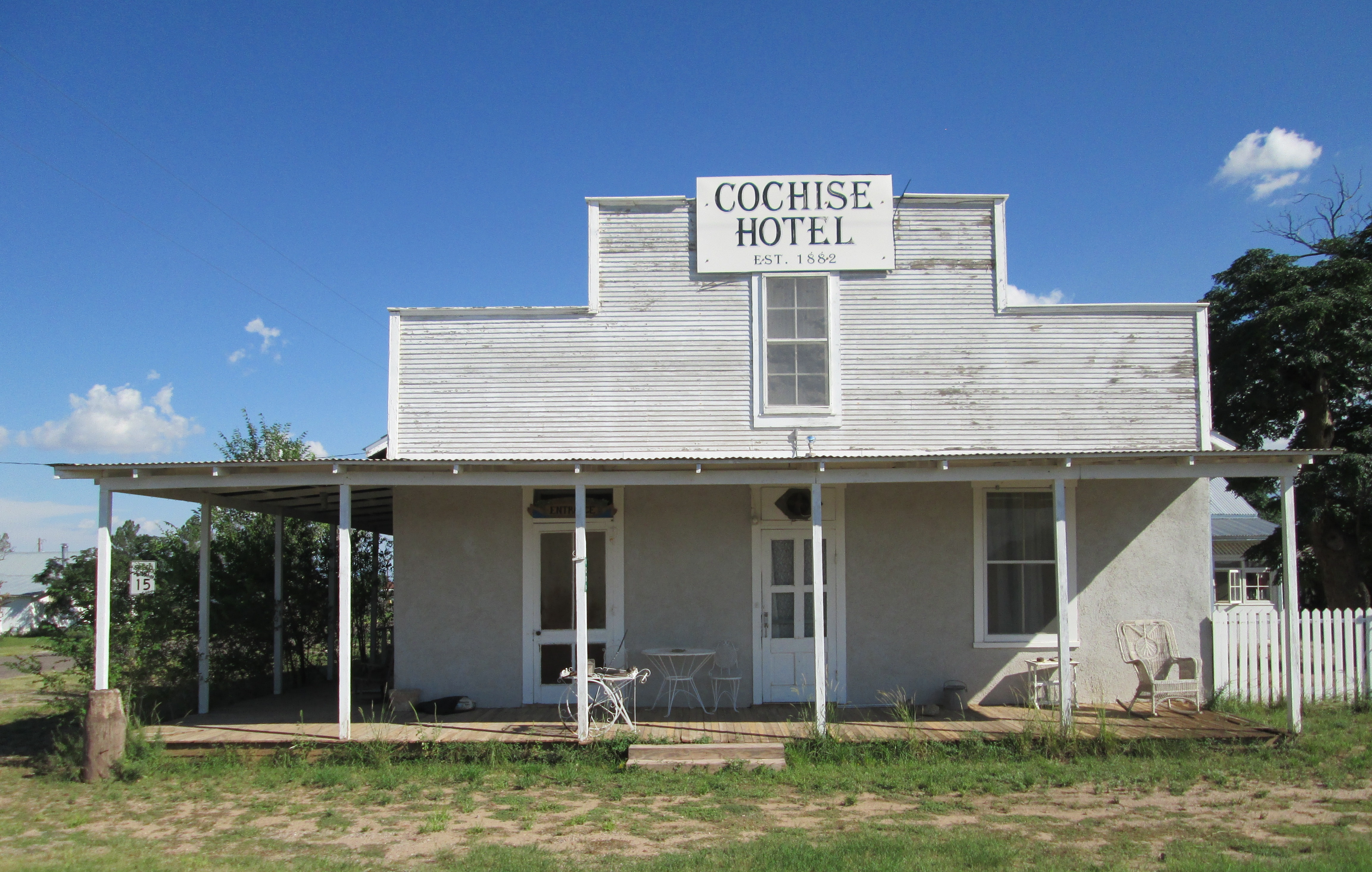
The Cochise Hotel.

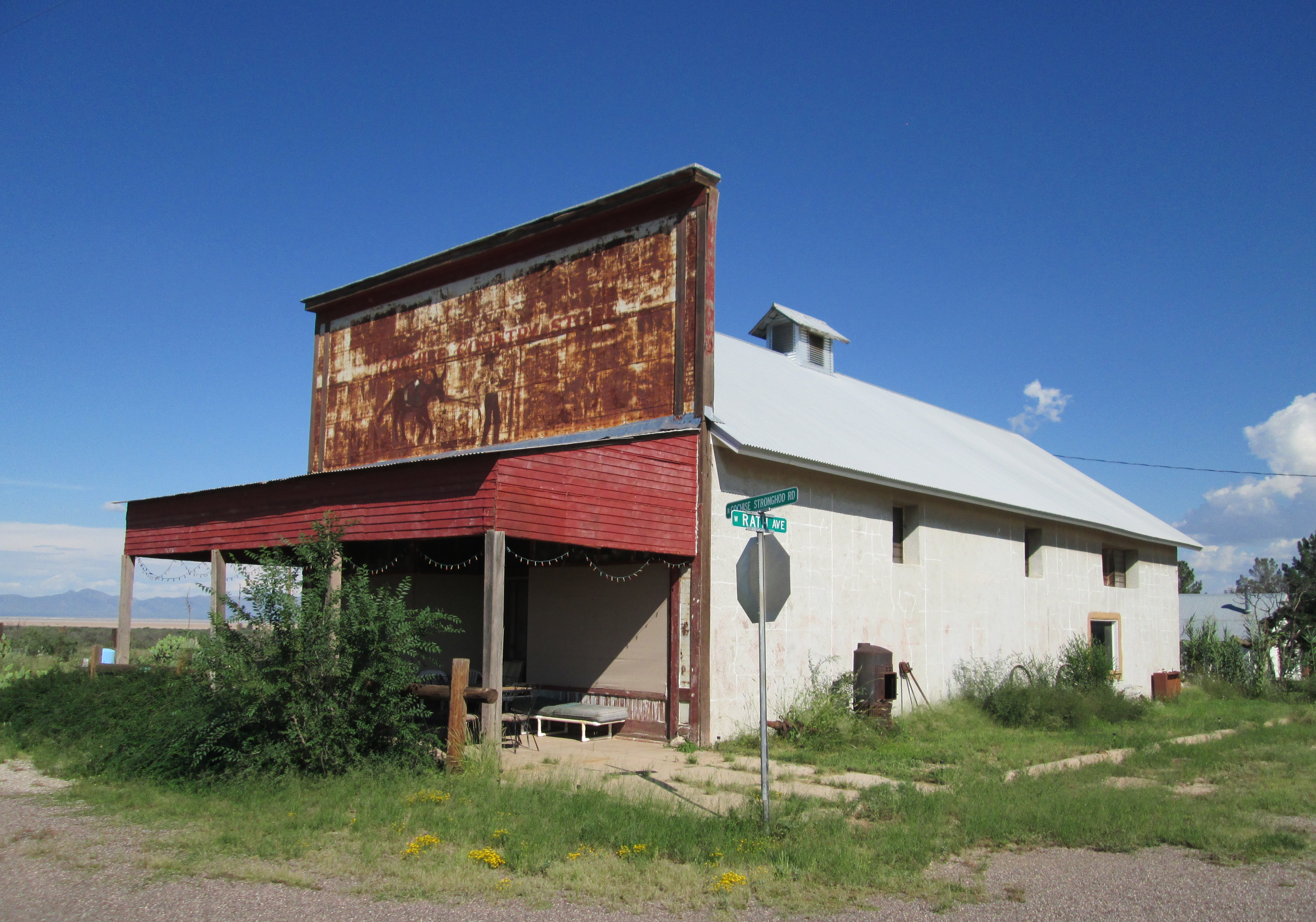
The Cochise Country Store, built in 1913.

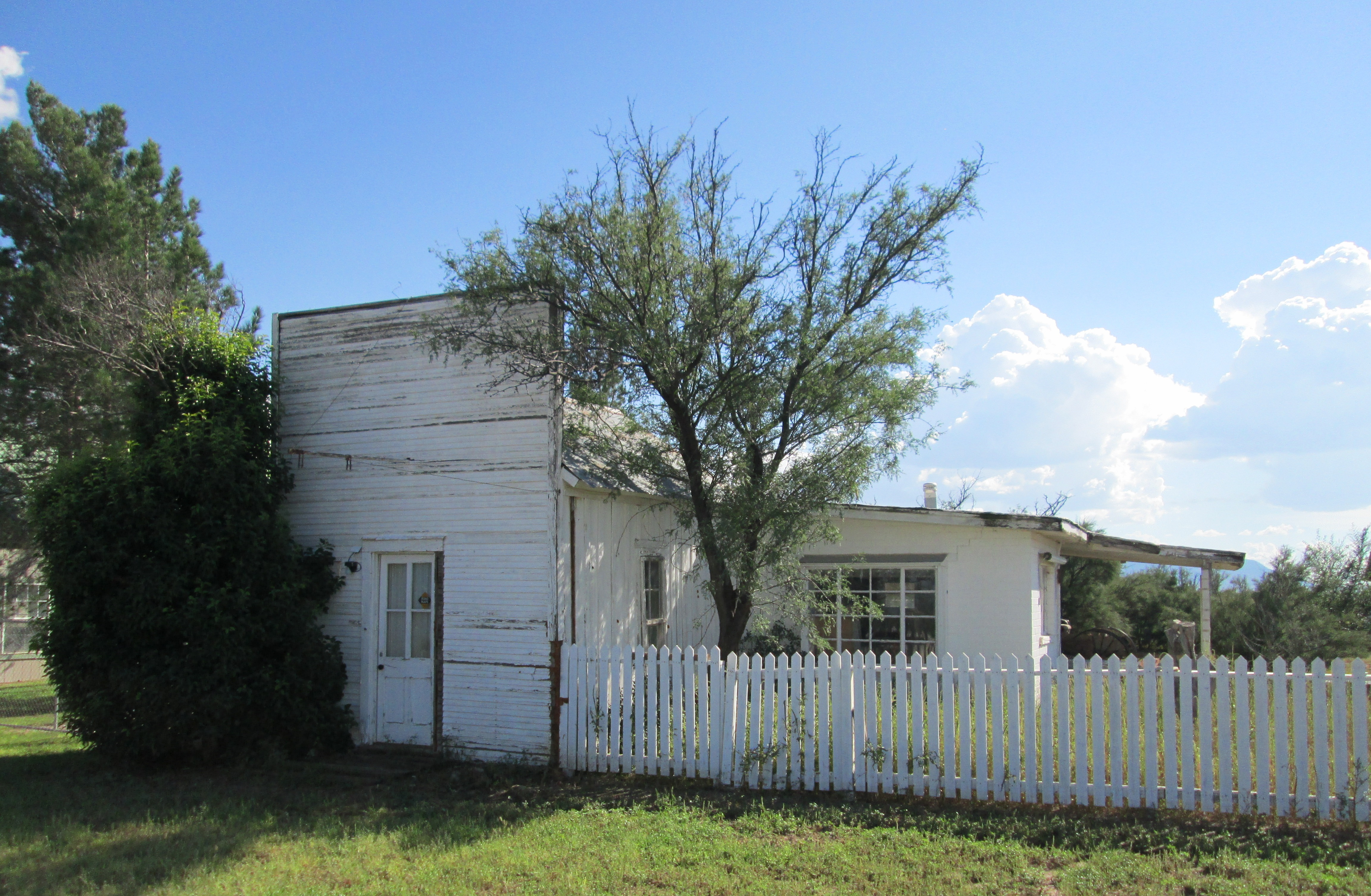
A small false front building.

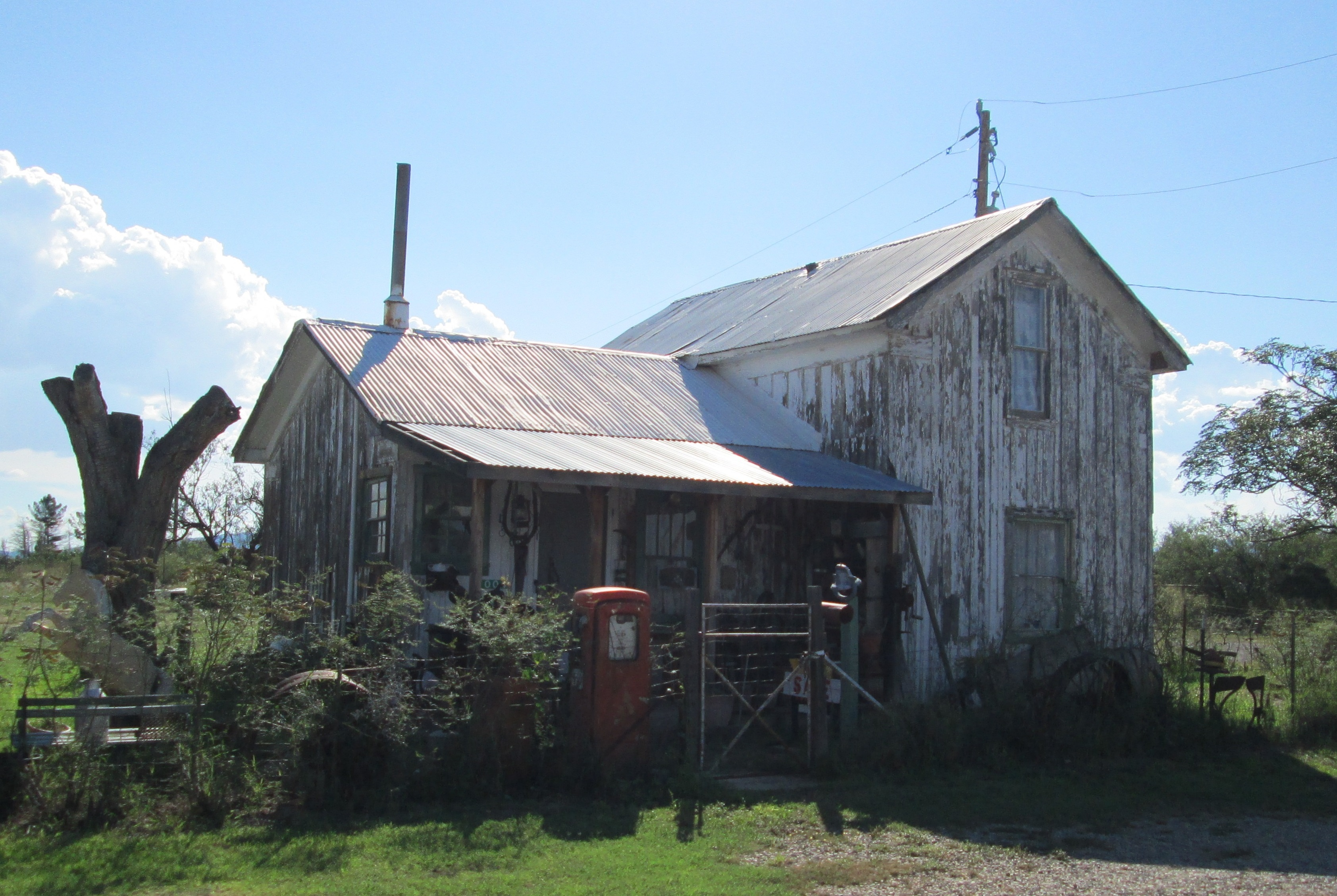
Former Cochise Train Depot, built in 1905.

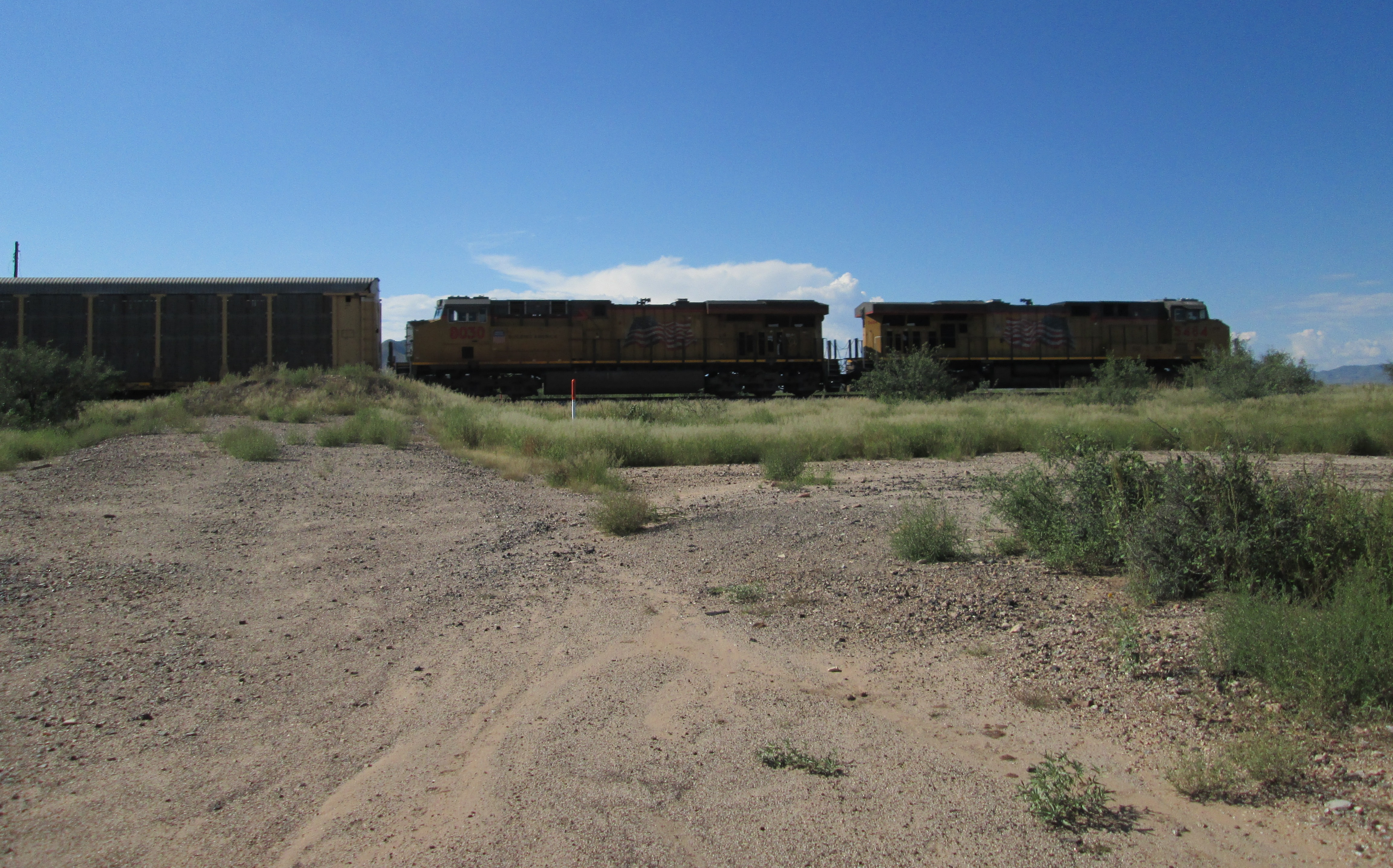
A Union Pacific Train passing through the site of the railroad depot.

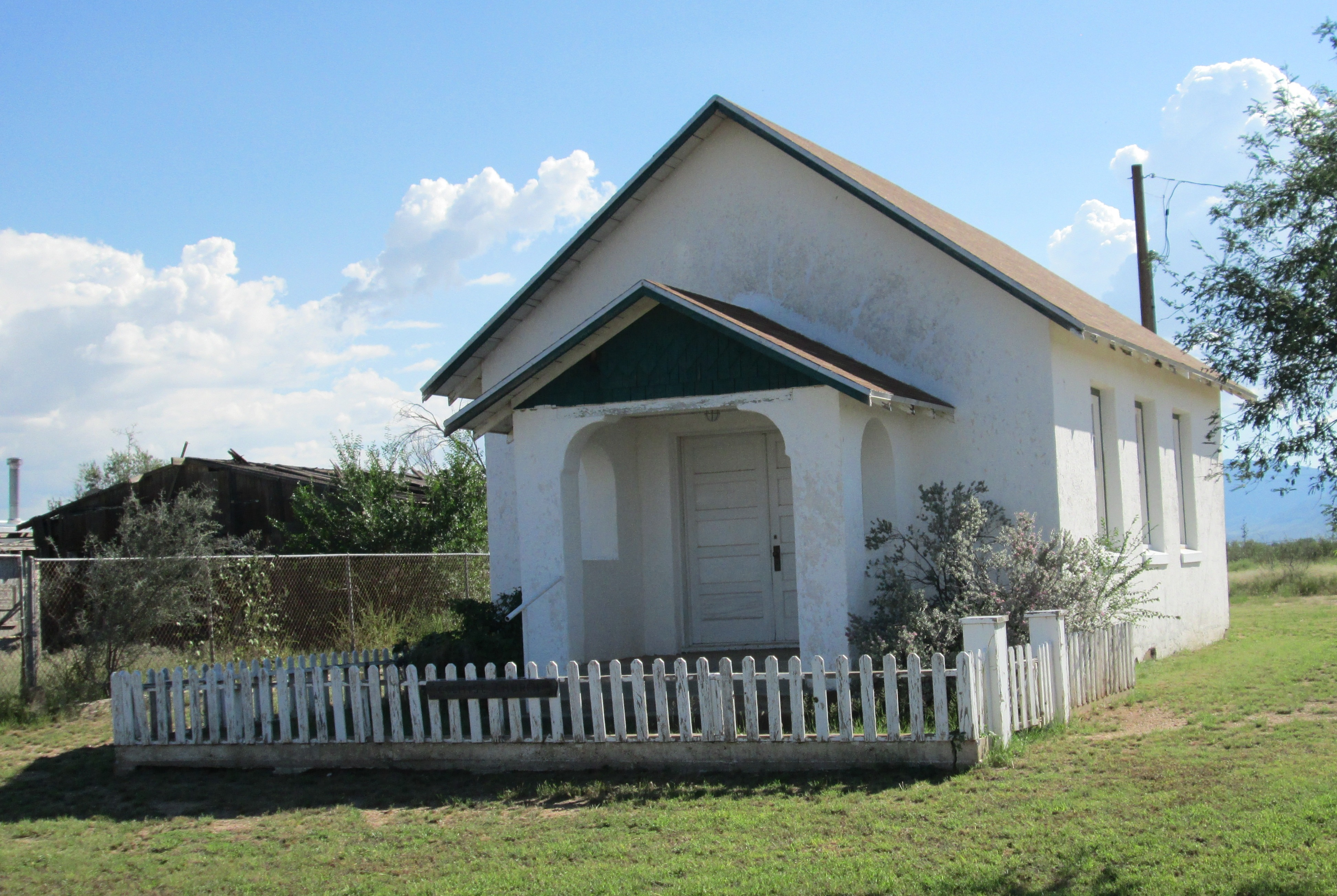
The Cochise Church.

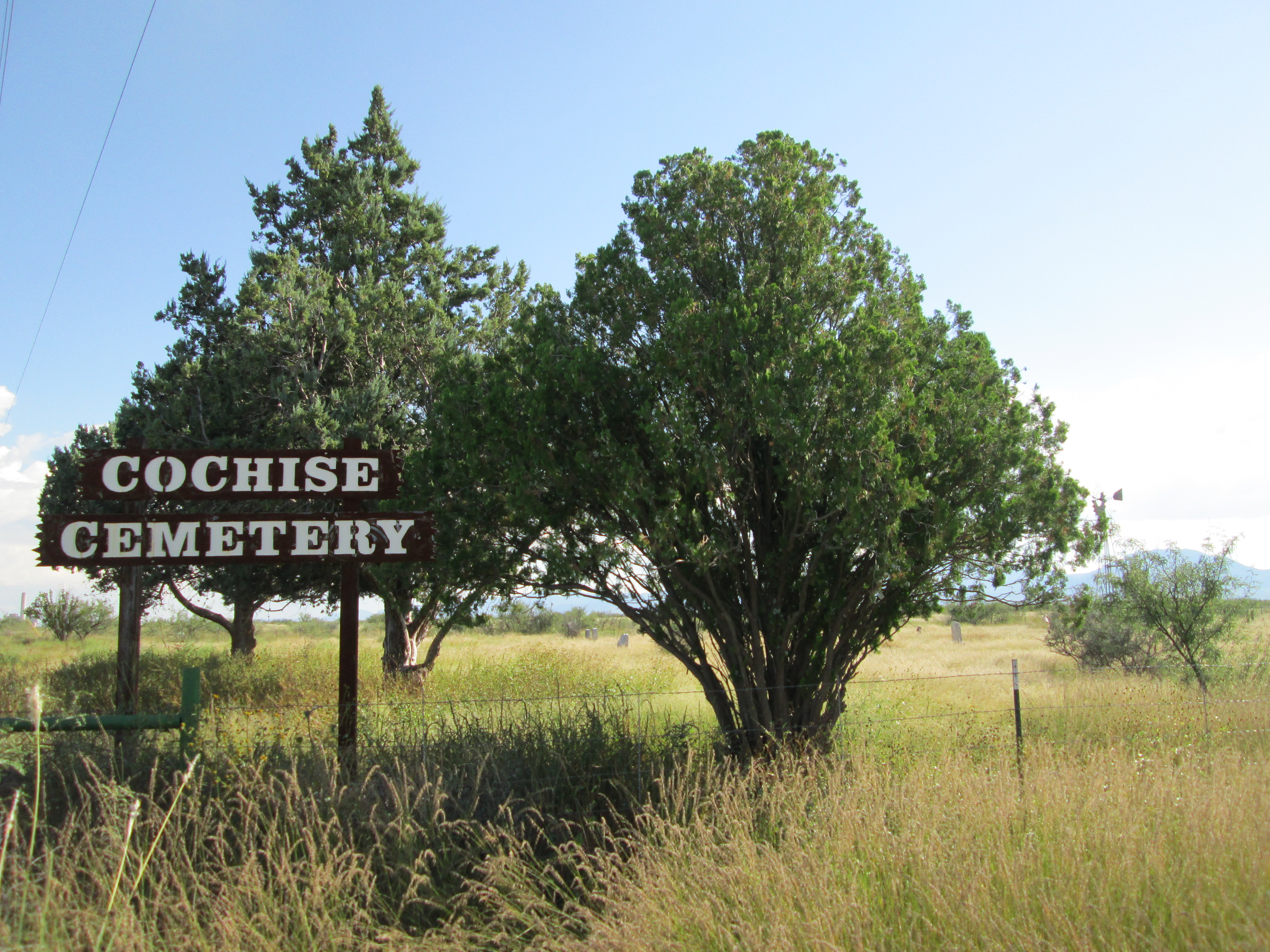
The Cochise Cemetery, a couple miles south of town.

== See also ==
- Willcox Playa
- Cochise Train Robbery
