= Cyclopic, Arizona =

- Ghost town
- Location within Arizona Location within the United States
- Coordinates: 35°46′58″N 114°14′46″W
- Country: United States
- State: Arizona
- County: Mohave
- Elevation: 4,341 ft (1,323 m)
- Time zone: UTC-7 (Mountain (MST))
  - Summer (DST): UTC-7 (MST)
- Area code: 928
- FIPS code: 04-17825
- GNIS feature ID: 24395

Cyclopic is a former mining village in Mohave County, Arizona, United States. It has an estimated elevation of 4,340 feet (1,320 m) above sea level.
