= Chutum Vaya, Arizona =

- Populated place
- Location within the state of Arizona Chutum Vaya, Arizona (the United States)
- Coordinates: 31°42′59″N 111°38′48″W
- Country: United States
- State: Arizona
- County: Pima
- Elevation: 3,668 ft (1,118 m)
- Time zone: UTC-7 (Mountain (MST))
  - Summer (DST): UTC-7 (MST)
- Area code: 520
- FIPS code: 04-13345
- GNIS feature ID: 24370

Chutum Vaya is a populated place situated in Pima County, Arizona, United States. It has an estimated elevation of 3,668 feet (1,118 m) above sea level.
