= Corva, Arizona =

Populated place in Coconino County, Arizona, US

- Populated place
- Location within the state of Arizona Corva, Arizona (the United States)
- Coordinates: 35°16′31″N 112°20′58″W
- Country: United States
- State: Arizona
- County: Coconino
- Elevation: 6,227 ft (1,898 m)
- Time zone: UTC-7 (Mountain (MST))
  - Summer (DST): UTC-7 (MST)
- Area code: 928
- FIPS code: 04-16225
- GNIS feature ID: 27984

Corva was a populated place situated in Coconino County, Arizona. It has an estimated elevation of 6,227 feet (1,898 m) above sea level.

== History ==
Corva was situated along the Santa Fe railroad. In 1913, houses were completed and occupied for area railroad workers.
