= Chiapuk, Arizona =

- Populated place
- Location within the state of Arizona Chiapuk, Arizona (the United States)
- Coordinates: 32°32′09″N 112°08′06″W
- Country: United States
- State: Arizona
- County: Pinal
- Elevation: 1,909 ft (582 m)
- Time zone: UTC-7 (Mountain (MST))
  - Summer (DST): UTC-7 (MST)
- Area code: 520
- FIPS code: 04-12510
- GNIS feature ID: 2806

Chiapuk, also known as Copperopolis and Copperosity, is a populated place situated in Pinal County, Arizona, United States. The word Chiapuk means "spring" in the O'odham language, and the variant name Copperosity is derived from the proximity of the Copperosity Mine. During the late 1880s, the local post office was known as the Copperopolis Post Office. It has an estimated elevation of 1,909 feet (582 m) above sea level.
