= Copperopolis, Arizona =

- Populated place
- Location within the state of Arizona Copperopolis, Arizona (the United States)
- Coordinates: 34°04′49″N 112°28′13″W
- Country: United States
- State: Arizona
- County: Yavapai
- Elevation: 3,356 ft (1,023 m)
- Time zone: UTC-7 (Mountain (MST))
- Area code: 928
- FIPS code: 04-14975
- GNIS feature ID: 24380

Copperopolis is a populated place situated in Yavapai County, Arizona, United States.
