= Chukut Kuk, Arizona =

- Populated place
- Location within the state of Arizona Chukut Kuk, Arizona (the United States)
- Coordinates: 31°45′56″N 112°06′18″W
- Country: United States
- State: Arizona
- County: Pima
- Elevation: 2,030 ft (620 m)
- Time zone: UTC-7 (Mountain (MST))
  - Summer (DST): UTC-7 (MST)
- Area code: 520
- FIPS code: 04-13315
- GNIS feature ID: 24369

Chukut Kuk (O'odham: Cukuḑ Ku:k) is a populated place situated in Pima County, Arizona, United States. It has also been known by the names: Tecolate, Tecoleto, Tecolote, and Tjukutko. The U.S. Geological Survey's Board on Geographic Names decided the official name was Chukut Kuk in 1941. It has an estimated elevation of 2,034 feet (620 m) above sea level.
