= Ab Saunders =

American cowboy and gunfighter (1851–1883)

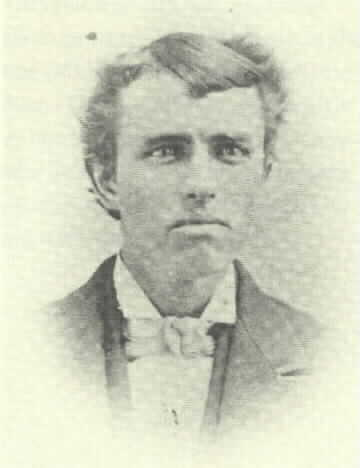
- Ab Saunders c. 1880
- Born: James Albert Saunders; October 14, 1851; Mount Pleasant, Iowa, US
- Died: February 5, 1883 (aged 31); San Francisco, California, US
- Occupations: Cowboy, gunman
- Known for: Lincoln County Regulators; Lincoln County War
- Relatives: Frank Coe (cousin); George Coe (cousin)

Ab Saunders (October 14, 1851 – February 5, 1883) was an American cowboy, and at times gunman, best known for his association with Billy the Kid, Charlie Bowdre, Frank McNab, Doc Scurlock, and Saunders's cousins Frank and George Coe, when he was a member of the Lincoln County Regulators, a deputized posse, during the 1878 Lincoln County War in the New Mexico Territory (New Mexico did not become a U.S. state until 1912.)

== Early move west, cowboy life ==
Born James Albert Saunders in Mount Pleasant, Iowa, Saunders was called Ab for short by those who knew him. Saunders joined the Coes around 1875, after first settling in Colfax County, New Mexico. They all intended to settle and build a ranch together. At the time, the corrupt Santa Fe Ring was in full swing, and in Lincoln, New Mexico, businessman and former soldier Lawrence Murphy and his partner had a monopoly on business, charging extremely high prices to ranchers and farmers for their goods.

Saunders began working with his cousins on their ranch, and took part in defending the herds against cattle rustling. In the spring of 1876, Saunders and his cousins met and became friends with Bowdre, Richard "Dick" Brewer and Scurlock. In March 1876, Billy the Kid, known at the time as either Henry Antrim or William H. Bonney, began working at a cheese factory owned by Bowdre and Scurlock and through them, he met the Coe cousins and Saunders.

In July 1876, Frank Coe and Saunders tracked down cattle rustler Nicas Meras, shooting and killing him in the Baca Canyon. On July 18, 1876, Bowdre, the Coe cousins, Saunders and Scurlock broke into the Lincoln jail, freeing horse thief Jesus Largo from Sheriff Saturnino Baca. They then took Largo outside of town and hanged him. When Bonney (Billy the Kid) was fired by rancher Henry Hooker, he began working as a cowboy for the Coes and Saunders.

== Involvement in the Lincoln County War ==
Through ranching, Saunders and his cousins became associated with large rancher John Tunstall, who in 1877 with the backing of the powerful John Chisum opened a rival business to the Murphy businesses, with partner Alexander McSween. This enraged Murphy and partner James Dolan, who hired members of both the Jesse Evans Gang and the John Kinney Gang, in addition to the Seven Rivers Warriors to goad Tunstall into a fight. Tunstall, in turn, hired gunmen of his own, to include Bonney, Bowdre, Brewer, the Coe brothers, Saunders, and Scurlock. On February 18, 1878, Tunstall was murdered by Jesse Evans and members of his gang, sparking the Lincoln County War.

Saunders remained allied with the McSween faction, and became an original member of the "Regulators", formed to counter the corrupt sheriff's office of William J. Brady, allied with Dolan-Murphy. On March 6, 1878, the Regulators arrested Frank Baker and Bill Morton, who were present at Tunstall's murder. Three days later Baker, Morton and Regulator William McCloskey were killed by the Regulators at Agua Negra, with McCloskey believed to have betrayed the Regulators. On April 1, 1878, Regulators Bonney, Henry Newton Brown, Jim French, McNab, John Middleton and Fred Waite shot at the sheriff and his deputies through makeshift portals of the adobe wall they were behind. Bonney was wounded by Deputy Matthews while attempting to recover the rifle taken from him by Brady. Sheriff Brady and Deputy Hindman were killed.

On April 4, 1878, the Gunfight of Blazer's Mills took place, during which Buckshot Roberts was killed, along with Regulator leader Brewer, in addition to Billy the Kid, Bowdre, George Coe, Middleton and Scurlock being wounded. McNab was elected as the new leader of the Regulators following Brewer's death. On April 29, 1878, while en route to the Coe Ranch, Frank Coe, McNab and Saunders stopped off at the Fritz Ranch to rest, where they were ambushed by members of the Seven Rivers Warriors. In the ensuing gun battle, McNab was killed and Saunders was shot through the hip and badly wounded, with Frank Coe captured. Because of his injury, Saunders was left behind.

The following day, George Coe, believing his brother had been killed and knowing that Saunders was wounded, shot and wounded Seven Rivers member "Dutch Charlie" Kruling in Lincoln. Seven Rivers members John Galvin, Tom Green, Charles Marshall, Jim Patterson were also killed that day in Lincoln, and the Regulators were blamed. However, it is believed just as possible that they were killed by other Seven Rivers members, as the gang had a lot of in-fighting among themselves by that point. Saunders, during that time, was just starting his recovery from his wound.

On May 15, 1878, the Regulators stormed Seven Rivers, New Mexico, killing gang member Manuel Segovia, who was believed to have shot and killed McNab. By July, Saunders had made a fair recovery from his wounds, but was not present during the Battle of Lincoln — the largest armed conflict of the Lincoln County War — during which McSween was killed. That battle, for all practical purposes, ended the Lincoln County War. Several others would die in the next four years or so because of their involvement in the war.

== Later life and death ==
Saunders moved with the Coe brothers to Colorado, then moved to San Francisco, California, to seek correction of ongoing problems that he continued to suffer because of the severe wound that he had received when McNab was killed. Saunders, however, died on February 5, 1883, at the age of thirty-one, while undergoing surgery.

The actor Michael Dante played the part of Saunders in the 1958 episode "The Deserters" of the ABC/Warner Brothers western television series Colt .45, starring Wayde Preston. Angie Dickinson as Laura Meadows and Myron Healey as an unnamed fur trader also appear in the guest cast.
