= Santa Fe Ring =

Criminal organization in New Mexico Territory

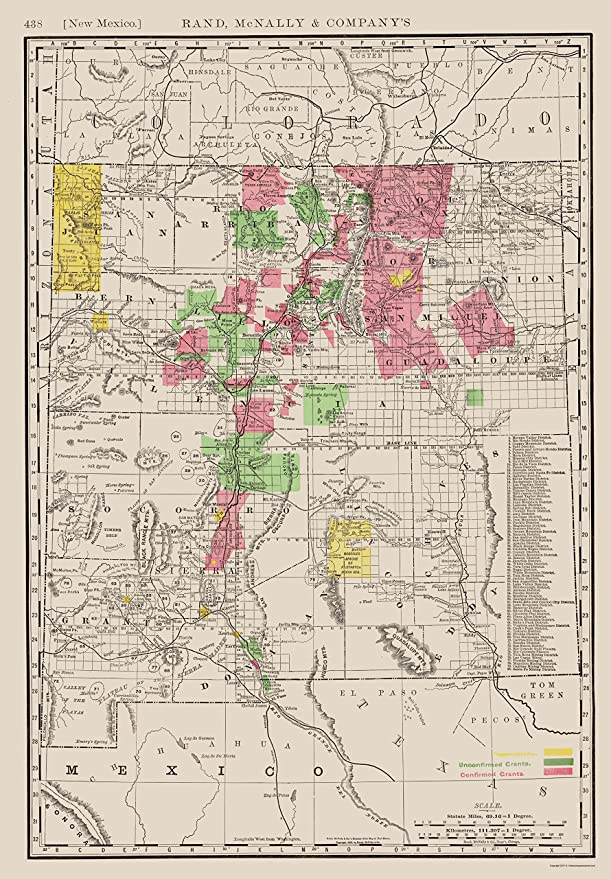
Rand McNally's 1897 map of New Mexico showing land grants recognized by the U.S.(red), not recognized (green), and Indian reservations (yellow).

The Santa Fe Ring was an informal group of powerful politicians, attorneys, and land speculators in territorial New Mexico from 1865 until 1912. The Ring was composed of newly-arrived Anglo Americans and opportunistic Hispanics from long-resident and prominent families in New Mexico. Acquiring wealth, both groups realized, lay in owning or controlling the millions of acres of land which the Spanish and Mexican governments of New Mexico had granted to individuals and communities. The acquisition of grant lands by members of the Santa Fe Ring was facilitated by U.S. courts who had no allegiance to Mexican claims and land practices which featured allocating most of the land in grants to the common ownership of the first settlers and their descendants vs. legal private ownership.

Many prominent people in New Mexico Territory including future Senator and Secretary of War Stephen Benton Elkins and future Senator Thomas B. Catron were associated with the Santa Fe Ring. The Ring figured into the various range wars and feuds such as the Pecos War, Lincoln County War, and the Colfax County War. The ring name was applied to almost all state politicians in the state capital in Santa Fe, New Mexico, who had near total control of the state during the late 19th and early 20th centuries and were said to turn a blind eye to or be actively involved in corruption. The most infamous period involving the Ring was in the 1870s, when ownership of huge Spanish and Mexican land grants was being sorted out.

== Background ==
The United States acquired the territory of New Mexico in 1846 from Mexico in the Mexican-American War. In the Treaty of Guadalupe Hidalgo of 1848, New Mexico and southern Colorado became territories of the United States. The treaty guaranteed the property rights of residents, mostly Hispanic, of the newly-acquired land. Prior to the U.S. conquest, the Spanish and New Mexican governments had distributed large acreages to Mexican citizens in the form of land grants. The U.S. government would later list 282 Spanish and Mexican land grants in New Mexico and Colorado totaling in area 34,653,346 acres (14,023,712 ha) (54,146 square miles), an area larger than the country of England and about the same size as the state of New York. However, the U.S. required that all land grants be "confirmed" (determined to be legal) and over the next 50 years in a series of decisions and court cases the U.S. government disallowed some of the grants and reduced the acreage of many grants. Most of the larger land grants were populated by Indian tribes and only sparsely populated, if at all, by Hispanic settlers.

In the Spanish and Mexican documentation, the acreage and boundaries of the land grants were often vague and record keeping erratic or non-existent. The Hispanic system of designating and describing land ownership was different than that of the Anglo, relying more on custom and actual usage of the land than precise legal descriptions. Typically, settlers on grants were allocated small plots of land for agriculture and residences but most grant land was designated as common land for the joint use of all the settlers and their descendants. The genesis of the Santa Fe Ring was in the 1850s when lawyers in New Mexico (of which there were only a few) realized "that a fortune lay in the legal process of quieting [obtaining] title to the disputed Spanish and Mexican land grants. Or, if not that, in securing for themselves or clients control of these lands for the purpose of speculation."

Hispanic claimants of land in the land grants often did not speak English and were suspicious of and unfamiliar with the American legal system -- so different from the Hispanic. Many of the claimants were poor and unable to pursue the lengthy and expensive legal process of getting a claim confirmed. Moreover, the Surveyors General appointed by the U.S. had little knowledge of Hispanic land practices and customs. "The situation was ripe for fraud." The results were "large grants owned by speculators were erroneously confirmed; other grants which should have been confirmed were not...[and]...some valid grants were confirmed, but to the wrong people." The Santa Fe Ring of lawyers and politicians, often in league with the Surveyors General, abused the adjudication system for their own benefit.

== Lincoln County War ==
Businessman and Union Army veteran Lawrence Murphy became a key figure in the ring during the 1860s, alongside his German-American partner Emil Fritz, forming "L.G. Murphy & Co." in 1866.

Murphy and Fritz were able to obtain false deeds to land, then sold that land, not actually owned by them, to newly arriving farmers and ranchers. When payments were missed, Murphy and Fritz would foreclose on the land, cattle, or crops. Within a very short time they were wealthy men. During that same period they acquired government contracts to supply beef and vegetables to Apache Native Americans living on the reservation, which they typically did not supply, at least not in the quantities called for in the contracts. However, as they were protected by their political contacts who also were tied into the ring, complaints by the Native Americans went with little notice or attention.

In 1869, Murphy hired James Dolan to work as a clerk for his company. Murphy's business, located in Lincoln, New Mexico, very quickly became the only supplier to local ranchers and farmers, with Murphy, Fritz, Dolan and businessman John H. Riley developing it into a monopoly. Owing to the absence of competition, they were able to charge high prices for their goods, angering many in the area. By 1877, with the backing of wealthy rancher John Chisum, rancher John Tunstall and businessman Alexander McSween opened rival businesses, enraging Murphy and Dolan. Murphy by this time was in the first stages of cancer, but remained involved in decisionmaking for his business.

He, Dolan and Riley hired the Jesse Evans Gang and the John Kinney Gang, both outlaw gangs of the time, to goad Tunstall into a fight. Both gangs began rustling Tunstall's cattle, and to counter them Tunstall hired numerous small-scale ranchers and cowboys as bodyguards. Former Murphy employee Dick Brewer served as Tunstall's foreman, with gunmen Doc Scurlock, Charlie Bowdre, and ranchers Frank Coe and George Coe rounding out the group. Frank McNab would also hire on, as would Billy the Kid and Ab Saunders.

This set the stage for what would become known as the Lincoln County War, sparked by the February 18, 1878 murder of Tunstall by Jesse Evans and members of his gang. The Tunstall faction formed the Lincoln County Regulators. On February 18, 1879, Evans murdered attorney Huston Chapman, who was representing Susan McSween's interests on behalf of her dead husband and the Regulators. By October 1878, Murphy had died from cancer. Subsequently James Dolan took active control of the Murphy-Dolan interests.

New Mexico Territorial Representative Juan Patron became an advocate for Susan McSween, becoming involved as opposition to the ring following the murders of two local Hispanic businessmen in Lincoln County. On April 9, 1884, Patron was shot and killed by cowboy Michael Maney in Puerto De Luna, after having received numerous threats owing to his opposition to the Santa Fe Ring. Maney was arrested, and stood trial represented by several prominent attorneys. The prosecutor in the case was Santa Fe Ring member Thomas B. Catron, and Maney was acquitted. Catron was tightly allied with Albert Fall who would be implicated in the Teapot Dome scandal.

According to legend the rerouting of U.S. Route 66 to avoid Santa Fe and instead pass through Albuquerque was done at the behest of Democratic Governor Arthur T. Hannett to punish the ring.
