= Robert Widenmann =

Deputy US Marshal, associate of Billy the Kid (1852–1930)

Robert A. Widenmann
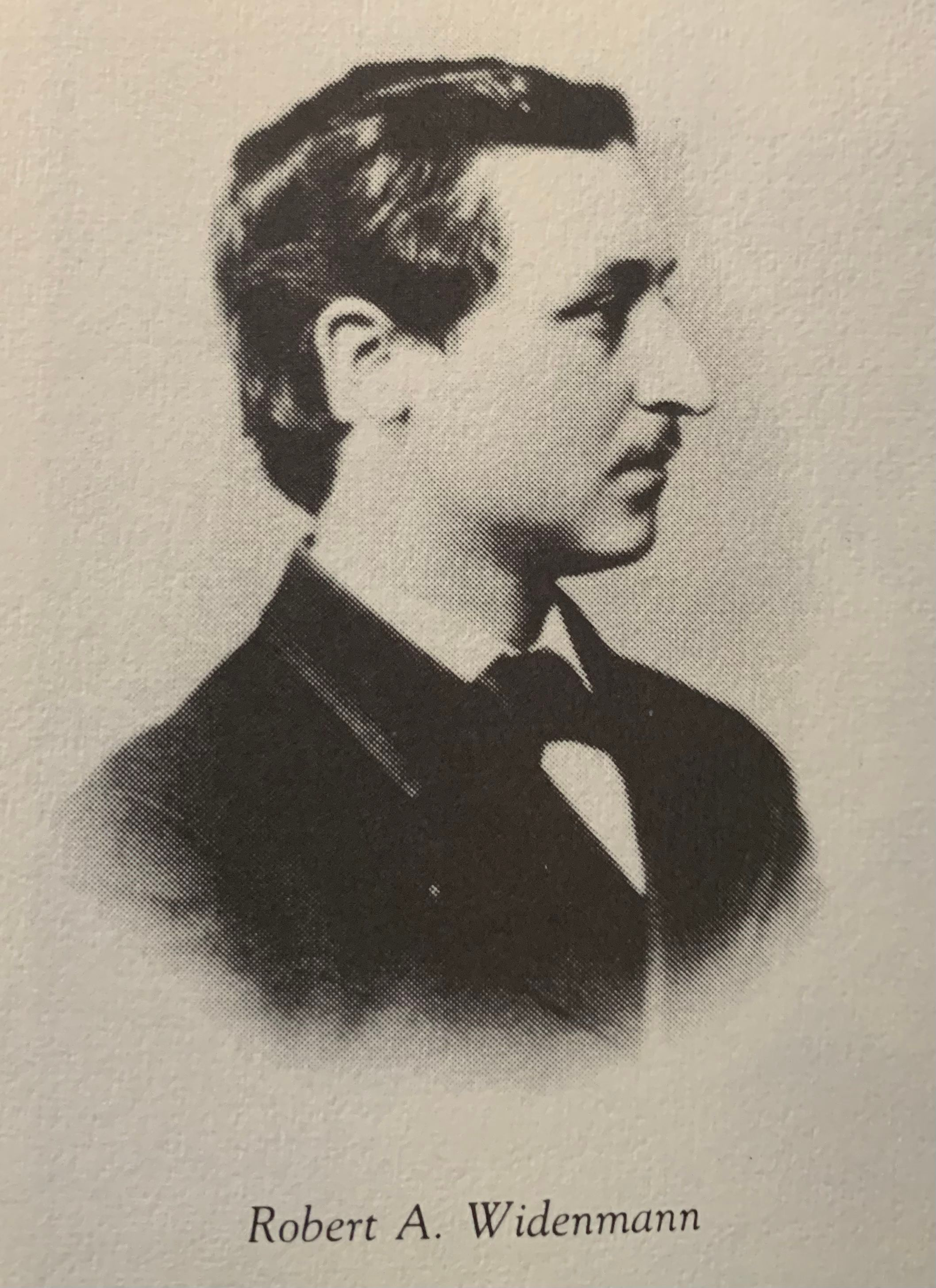
- Born: Robert August Herman Widenmann; January 24, 1852; Ann Arbor, Michigan, United States
- Died: April 13, 1930 (aged 78); Haverstraw, New York, United States
- Resting place: Mount Repose Cemetery
- Occupation: Deputy US Marshal
- Organization: Lincoln County Regulators
- Spouse: Albertine Seiler-Lemcke (m. 1881; died 1905)
- Children: 4

Robert A. Widenmann (January 24, 1852 – April 13, 1930) was a Deputy United States Marshal and associate of Billy the Kid during the Lincoln County War.

== Early life ==
Widenmann was born January 24, 1852, to German-born parents in Ann Arbor, Michigan. Widenmann's father was the Bavarian Consul in Ann Arbor. As a teenager, Widenmann was sent back to the family's native Germany for his schooling. He lived there for several years with a grandfather.

Returning to America in 1871, Widenmann settled in New York City, where he remained for two years before drifting west, finally arriving in Lincoln in mid-February 1877. In New Mexico, he would be appointed Deputy Marshal by U.S. Marshal for New Mexico Territory John Sherman Jr.

According to a recently discovered baptismal certificate, his name was not Robert Adolph but Robert August Herman; born at Ann Arbor, Michigan, on January 24, 1852, he was the oldest son of Karl August and Pauline (Gärttner) Widenmann.

Widenmann's name was spelled with many variations. (Widenmann is correct.)

== Lincoln County War ==
On February 18, 1878, John Tunstall was killed, allegedly while resisting arrest, by Lincoln County Deputy Sheriffs William Morton, Frank Baker, Jesse Evans, and Tom Hill. Tunstall had been accompanied by Robert Widenmann, Dick Brewer, Billy the Kid, John Middleton, Henry Newton Brown, and Fred Waite while driving horses from his ranch on the Rio Feliz to Lincoln to conceal the herd from court ordered confiscation as collateral for Tunstall and McSween's debts.

On February 20, 1878, Sheriff William J. Brady, and his deputies arrested Billy the Kid and two other members of the Regulators riding with him. Three days later, Deputy U.S. Marshal Robert Widenmann, and a detachment of soldiers disarmed Sheriff Brady's jail guards, put them behind bars, and released the Kid and Brewer.

On March 9, 1878, New Mexico territorial Governor, Samuel Beach Axtell, issued a proclamation revoking Rob's appointment as Deputy U.S. Marshall.

On March 30, 1878, The Santa Fe New Mexican announced that U.S. Marshal John E. Sherman had reinstated Widenmann to the deputyship.

On April 1, 1878, Regulators Jim French, Frank McNab, John Middleton, Fred Waite, Henry Newton Brown and Billy the Kid ambushed Sheriff William J. Brady and four of his deputies on the main street of Lincoln. They fired on the five men from behind an adobe wall on John Tunstall's property. Sheriff Brady died of at least a dozen gunshot wounds in the back. Deputy Sheriff George W. Hindman was hit twice, fatally. Widenmann was present, but whether he participated has never been ascertained: Widenmann claimed he was feeding Tunstall's dog at the time of the shooting. (When later asked at an inquiry why he was in possession of two pistols and a rifle, Widenmann replied that the dog was vicious).

Both Billy the Kid and Deputy Marshal Widenmann were sought by the Lincoln County Sheriff's Department for prosecution over their involvement in the murders of Sheriff Brady and Deputy Hindman. Deputy Marshal Widenmann surrendered to the United States Army at Fort Stanton.

On April 4, 1878, Lieut. Col. Nathan Dudley assumed command of Fort Stanton and immediately released Widenmann and three others in default of legal documents.

On April 7, 1878, Widenmann and Marshal John E. Sherman Jr., arrested Jesse Evans. Within hours, however Lt.-Col. Dudley procured arrest warrants for Deputy U.S. Marshall Widenmann and seven other members of the Regulators, who were now rearrested and held at Fort Stanton pending investigation in connection with the murder of Brady. Here they remained until 18 April, when a grand jury ordered the release of four prisoners, including Rob, and returned indictments against the others.

On May 2, 1878, Widenmann, Alexander McSween, and seven others were incarcerated, this time by Lincoln County Sheriff John Copeland on Dudley's orders, only to be released two days later on lack of evidence.

On June 12, 1878, Rob left Lincoln for the last time, traveling under United States Army escort to Mesilla, New Mexico to testify against Jesse Evans. This he did on 2 July.

Toward the end of September or the first week of October 1878, Widenmann, fearing for his life, fled the territory making his way east to ship out for London.

== Later life ==
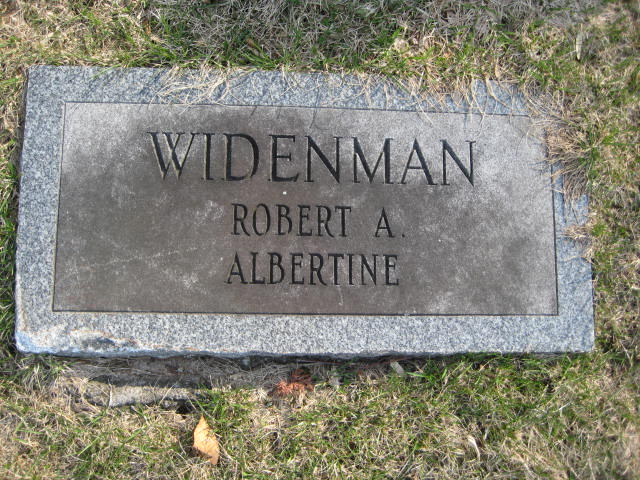
Robert and Albertine Widenmann’s gravestone. Mount Repose Cemetery, Haverstraw New York. Spelling of the name on the gravestone ("Widenman") is incorrect.

Robert A. Widenmann's post-New Mexico career took him to Great Britain, where he visited Tunstall's family, and onto New York where in 1896 he was a National Democratic candidate for U.S. Representative from New York 17th District. He died in Haverstraw, N.Y. on April 13, 1930, at the age of 78.

According to his daughter Elsie, Widenmann lived in fear of his life for many years because of his role in the Lincoln county war and in bucking such powerful New Mexico politicians as Stephen B. Elkins.

== See also ==
- List of Western lawmen
