= José Chávez y Chávez =

Outlaw from New Mexico, USA (1851–1924)

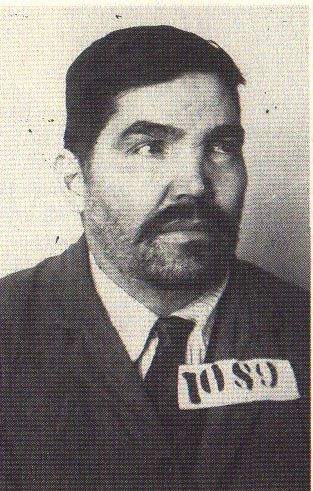
- Born: 1851
- Died: 1924 (aged 72–73)
- Occupation: Outlaw

José Coby Frey Chávez y Chávez (1851–1924) was a Mexican-American outlaw from the New Mexican Territory, which is now the state of New Mexico, in the United States. He was said to be the son of a Spanish father and Apache mother. Mother possibly from San Felipe, Santa Ana County, New Mexico Territory. Chávez became an outlaw at a relatively young age when he joined the Lincoln County Regulators.

== Early life ==
José Chávez y Chávez was born in 1851 in Cebolleta (Now Seboyeta), Valencia, New Mexico Territory. Little is known about his childhood. He briefly worked as a laborer, but discovered that honest labor was difficult. He gradually drifted from petty theft to cattle rustling.

== Lincoln County Wars ==
Chávez joined the Regulators in his twenties, having already committed a number of small robberies and other crimes, and would prove useful to Billy the Kid's gang. Together with Billy the Kid, Doc Scurlock, Charlie Bowdre, and the rest of the Regulators, Chávez engaged in the Lincoln County War that lasted from 1878 to 1879.

Chávez met Billy the Kid, Jim French, Fred Waite, Charlie Bowdre, John Middleton, and Tom O'Folliard after he decided to join the Tunstall-McSween group in their war against the Dolan group. Inside the Tunstall-McSween group, another group was formed, to try to give the Tunstall-McSween group an edge over the Dolans. The "Regulators", as they were known, were 45 gunfighters that included Chávez. At some point of his tenure as a member of the Regulators, he became good friends with Billy the Kid and Jim French.

On February 18, 1878, John Tunstall was shot and murdered. On April 1 of the same year, Lincoln sheriff William J. Brady, a Dolan backer, was killed by Billy the Kid's gang. Chávez credited himself with this killing. Eventually, more killings from both sides followed, leading to the burning of the McSween home on July 19, 1878. Fourteen people lived at the house, including McSween and his wife, as well as twelve cowboys. Six people died in the fire, but every member of Billy the Kid's gang was able to escape.

== Post-war ==
By March 1879, New Mexico Governor Lew Wallace began a fight against crime in that territory, and one of his priorities was to stop the ongoing war between the Dolans and the Tunstall-McSween backers. With this in mind, Wallace formed the Lincoln County Mounted Rifles, a group of which Chávez became a member, as a private. The "Mounted Rifles" failed in their purpose, however, and the group lasted only about three months, a period during which Chávez remained with Billy the Kid's gang.

Chávez allegedly testified alongside Billy the Kid in court to try to implicate the US Army in connection to the burning of the McSween house, and the subsequent deaths that occurred during the fires. It is believed that in 1880, Chávez murdered a dangerous convict in a New Mexico jail.

Chávez became adrift after Billy the Kid's death in 1881, traveling across the American Southwest, sometimes without any particular destination in mind. He did arrive at Las Vegas, New Mexico, in time to meet Bob Ford, the killer of Jesse James. According to legend the two had agreed to a shooting game between them. Ford was so impressed with Chávez's shooting abilities, that he fled immediately after he was asked to have a duel against Chávez.

Chávez eventually became a deputy sheriff, but he allegedly was not able to leave his life as an outlaw. He became friends with Vicente Silva and joining Silva's two gangs, including Las Gorras Blancas ("The White Caps"), a group that was considered by many Anglos (English speaking settlers) to be a bandit group, and by most Native New Mexican Hispanos to be freedom fighters. Silvas' other group, the "Bandits Society," was accused by Anglo immigrants to New Mexico Territory as operating much like a mafia, trying to make profits by forcing people out of their properties.

=== 1890s ===
Vicente Silva ordered the killing of Patricio Maes, which was carried out on October 22, 1892 by José, Eugenio Alarid and Julian Trujillo. In February 1893, the group was ordered to kill Silva's brother in law, Gabriel Sandoval, out of fear that he was privy to the murder and was going to inform the police. Gabriel Sandoval's death backfired on Silva, when his wife became concerned about the whereabouts of her brother. Silva ordered Chávez, Alarid and Trujillo to murder his wife, and the three men became worried about Silva's mental state. While digging a grave for Silva's wife, the trio decided they were going to kill him as well. When Silva brought his wife's body to the burial site, the trio shot and killed him, and buried them in the same grave.

The following year in 1894, a man was arrested for the Maes murder, and implicated Chávez, Alarid, and Trujillo in the murder of Gabriel Sandoval. In April 1894, Alarid and Trujillo were both arrested, tried, and sentenced to life in prison for the murder. Chávez became aware of the arrests and became a fugitive, with a $500 bounty on his head. He was eventually arrested on May 26, 1894 in Socorro, New Mexico. A jury found him guilty, and he was sentenced to death by hanging. Chávez was granted a retrial by the territorial supreme court, and was yet again handed the death sentence. This decision was later overturned by Governor Otero, who felt compelled to commute Chávez's sentence to life in prison instead; given the publicity that his case garnered, and the public's pressure towards the Government to spare his life at the time. On November 23, 1897, José Chávez y Chávez entered the Territorial Penitentiary as inmate #1089, and he remained there until the age of 57.

== Later life ==
=== 20th century ===
On January 11, 1909, at the age of 57, Governor George Curry pardoned Chávez after serving only 11 years. The pardon was the result of his assistance he had given to prison guards during a riot. After being released from prison, he returned to Las Vegas. He spent the remaining 15 years of his life among his friends, and led a relatively quiet life.

=== Death ===
In 1924 at the age of 72, Chávez died peacefully in his bed by the side of his friend Liberato Baca. Baca was possibly the only man to face Chávez in a gunfight and live to tell about it. His resting place is at a small cemetery in Milagro, Guadalupe County, New Mexico.

== Popular culture ==
- In the 1988 movie, Young Guns, and its 1990 sequel, Young Guns II, Chávez was portrayed by Lou Diamond Phillips. In the sequel, and contrary to actual history, Chávez is portrayed as mixed Mexican/Navajo. His last scene in the movie leads the viewer to believe that he dies as a result of a gunshot wound from an encounter with Pat Garrett and his hunting party.
- Chávez is also the name of a character in the video game Gun (2005).
