= George W. Hindman =

American Old West cowboy and deputy sheriff (d. 1878)

George W. Hindman (died April 1, 1878) was a 19th-century American cowboy and law enforcement officer serving as a Deputy Sheriff of Lincoln County, New Mexico, during the early months of the Lincoln County War.

He was one of several men who murdered rancher John Tunstall and was later hunted down by Billy the Kid and the Lincoln County Regulators and killed.

== Biography ==
Hindman was born in County Cavan, Ireland and moved to the United States at a young age, eventually ending up in Texas where he worked for several years. Arriving in the New Mexico Territory from Texas in 1875, the former cowboy was eventually hired on as a deputy sheriff in Lincoln County, New Mexico. He was part of the posse who gunned down John Tunstall, a local rancher and merchant who was a chief rival of Murphy and Dolan, on February 18, 1878. The posse included William Morton, Jessie Evans, Frank Barker, Thomas Hill, J.J. Dolan and several others. He had been one of thirteen men selected by Morton that afternoon to go after Tunstall and his ranch hands under the suspicion of stealing horses from the Murphy-Dolan faction. Only a week earlier, he had helped fellow deputy sheriff Jacob B. Matthews, John Hurley, Manuel Segovia and Andrew L. Roberts in capturing the horses and cattle in the upper Rio Feliz-area owned by Tunstall and McSween.

On April 1 he was walking towards the Lincoln courthouse with Dad Peppin, Billy Matthews and Sheriff William J. Brady when they were ambushed from behind the corral wall of the Tunstall & McSween store and residence by Billy the Kid and half a dozen of his Regulators including Jim French, Frank McNab, John Middleton, Fred Waite, Henry Brown and possibly Robert A. Widenmann. After Brady was gunned down, Hindman ran nearly a hundred and fifty yards down the street before he was cut down as well, shot in the back by Frank McNab reportedly. No one attempted to get to Hindman as he lay dying in the street until local saloon-keeper Ike Stockton finally brought him some water which he carried in his hat. Stockton stayed with him only a short while as Hindman died from his wounds moments later.

Their bodies remaining in the street for several hours, he was later buried with Brady on the sheriff's ranch a few miles east of Lincoln.
