= Dick Brewer, Billy the Kid and the Regulators =

Painting by Andrew Thomas

Dick Brewer, Billy the Kid and the Regulators is a painting by artist Andrew "Andy" Thomas that depicts the Regulators as they hunt down William Morton and Frank Baker for the murder of businessman John Tunstall. This painting was sold at the Midwest Gathering of Artists in Carthage, Missouri on September 11, 2010.

== Background ==
The event depicted in this painting by Andrew Thomas occurred during the Lincoln County War. Dick Brewer, Billy the Kid, and the other Regulators were given warrants for the murderers of Tunstall, which included William Morton. After a five-mile gun chase, Morton surrendered on the condition that he and Baker would not be killed. On the third day on the trip back to Lincoln however, Morton and Baker ended up dead. The Regulators said that the prisoners had tried to escape; the Dolan forces believed that the Regulators had actually murdered Baker and Morton, but the only witnesses were the potential murderers themselves.
