= Battle of Lincoln (1878) =

Five-day-long firefight between civilians in Lincoln, New Mexico

Coordinates: 33.490219°N 105.3927°W

Date	July 15–19, 1878
Location	Lincoln County, New Mexico Territory, United States
Result	Regulators escaped and disbanded afterwards

Belligerents
Murphy-Dolan Faction (United States) Fort Stanton	Regulators

Commanders and leaders
George Smith; George Peppin (United States) Nathan Dudley	Alexander McSween †; Billy the Kid

Strength
150 Murphy-Dolan Faction ~60	46–53

Casualties and losses
2 killed 5-10 wounded	5 killed 4-5 wounded
- Civilian casualties: 1 wounded

The Battle of Lincoln, New Mexico, so-called Five-Day Battle or Five-Day Siege, was a five-day-long firefight between the Murphy-Dolan Faction and the Regulators that took place between July 15–19, 1878, in Lincoln, New Mexico. It was the largest armed battle of the Lincoln County War in the New Mexico Territory. The firefight was interrupted and suppressed by United States Cavalry led by Lt. Col. Nathan Dudley from Fort Stanton.

By September 1878, when Territorial Governor Lew Wallace was appointed by the president, many of the Regulators and other fighters had returned to normal life, as many had left the area. Wallace tasked Lincoln County Sheriff Pat Garrett to reduce lawlessness in the region, and, within three years, he and his deputies had hunted down and killed William "Billy the Kid" Bonney and other figures who had continued to operate in the area.

== Background ==
Armed conflict in the Lincoln County War began with the killing of John Tunstall on February 18, 1878, by members of the Jesse Evans Gang (who were hired as gunmen by the "Murphy-Dolan" faction—referred to as "The House" by local residents) to harass their commercial competition in Lincoln. Tunstall had become a competitor of the established Murphy-Dolan mercantile store and bank.

The failure of Lincoln County Sheriff William J. Brady to take action against those responsible for the death of Tunstall led to Tunstall's supporters forming their own armed vigilante group. They called themselves the Lincoln County Regulators, and were led by Richard "Dick" Brewer. Other members included gunmen such as Charlie Bowdre, John Middleton, Frank Coe, George Coe, "Big Jim" French, Doc Scurlock, and William Bonney (later known as "Billy the Kid"). The conflict resulted in numerous deaths on both sides, including the killing of Sheriff Brady on April 1, 1878.

On April 29, 1878, George Peppin, the newly appointed county sheriff, led a posse that included Jesse Evans and several of his gang, as well as the Seven Rivers Warriors gang to engage three Regulators in a shootout at the Fritz Ranch, resulting in the death of Frank McNab, the wounding of Ab Saunders, and the capture of Frank Coe. Shortly after his capture, Frank Coe escaped custody, although the details are unknown.

The following morning, George Coe took up a defensive position on the roof of Alexander McSween's house. Coe had lost his trigger finger earlier in the month in a gunfight with Buckshot Roberts. He took aim at 'Dutch Charlie' Kruling, a member of the Seven Rivers gang. As the distance exceeded 350 yards, Henry Brown warned Coe he was wasting his shot, but Coe shot and successfully wounded Kruling. That same day, Seven Rivers members Tom Green, Charles Marshall, Jim Patterson, and John Galvin were killed in Lincoln, and the Regulators were blamed.

On May 15, a group of 22 Regulators—led by Deputy Sheriff Scurlock and including Bonnie—tracked down Manuel Segovia of the Seven Rivers gang. They believed he had killed McNab. Segovia was reportedly shot and killed while trying to escape custody.

== The battle ==
McSween, although a non-participant, was the former partner of John Tunstall, and, along with John Chisum, had organized and financially supported the Regulators. On July 15, 1878, McSween returned to Lincoln with about 41 additional supporters, ten of whom he put up in his home; while the rest found beds throughout the town. Shortly afterward, a large force hired by the "Murphy-Dolan" faction and led by Peppin, arrived in Lincoln, and surrounded the Regulators at McSween's house.

The posse and the Regulators traded gunfire for much of that day. At least five Murphy-Dolan men were wounded in the initial exchange, while the Regulators suffered no casualties. During the next three days, little changed, with no further casualties reported. Finally, on July 18, a cavalry detachment under the command of Lt. Col. Nathan Dudley from Fort Stanton arrived. They had either been summoned by frightened residents or by a report that a soldier had been wounded in Lincoln. The soldiers quickly ended the skirmish. By the end of the third day, the McSween supporters scattered around town had departed, leaving just the contingent at the McSween homestead. At some point during the night of July 18–19, however, the McSween house was set afire. When McSween and the others attempted to flee the following morning, he and several other Regulators were shot and killed. Now under the leadership of Bonney and Jim French, the Regulators quickly reassessed their position, and forced an escape from the burning adobe house. Reported casualty figures for the battle varied, but the Regulators lost at least five men, including McSween, while Peppin's posse suffered two dead: Bob Beckwith and Charlie Crawford.

== Aftermath ==
The widow, Susan McSween, tried to have members of the Murphy-Dolan faction prosecuted, but no legal action was taken against them. Col. Dudley was placed under investigation for his failure to complete his mission without further bloodshed, but was cleared a year later when the army decided not to file charges.

In September 1878, President Rutherford B. Hayes dismissed Governor Axtell, replacing him with Lew Wallace, who was determined to reduce the lawlessness in the territory. By that time, the remaining Regulators had broken up. Scurlock, for instance, moved to Texas, where he settled down and raised a family. He and his wife had 10 children and he managed the local mail station; he died in Eastland, Texas, at 80 years old. The cousins Frank and George Coe also went straight, leaving Lincoln and living to be old men. In 1934, George Coe published his memoir, Frontier Fighter, recounting his part in the Lincoln County War and his friendship with Billy the Kid.

Others, such as William Bonney, Charlie Bowdre, Tom O'Folliard, and Jose Chavez y Chavez, remained on the wrong side of the law. Over the next few years, Bonney, Bowdre, and O'Folliard, who were bandits, were hunted down and killed by Sheriff Garrett and his deputies. Chavez was convicted of murder and sentenced to life in prison in 1894 in an unrelated case. He received a pardon in 1910.

Governor Lew Wallace issued general amnesties for many who took part in the conflict. He issued warrants for others, such as Bonney. He met him in Lincoln, where he offered the Kid a pardon if the latter would testify against the Murphy-Dolan faction in court. The Kid agreed, and after a staged arrest, gave his testimony at trial. Wallace failed to grant the promised pardon, and ignored Billy's subsequent correspondence imploring the governor to hold up his end of the bargain.

The "war" led to the notoriety of Billy the Kid. Bonney escaped from jail, and Wallace issued a warrant and offered a $500 reward for his arrest. He was eventually killed by lawman Pat Garrett. The state considered a posthumous pardon of Bonney in 2010, but this was protested by law enforcement groups and descendants of the three officers killed by him.
