= Copperhead (2008 film) =

2008 TV film

- DVD cover
- Written by: Rafael Jordan
- Directed by: Todor Chapkanov
- Starring: Brad Johnson; Keith Stone; Brad Greenquist; Wendy Carter; Gabriel Womack; Billy Drago
- Theme music composer: Nathan Furst
- Country of origin: United States
- Original language: English

Production
- Producers: Phillip J. Roth; Jeffery Beach
- Cinematography: Lorenzo Senatore
- Editor: John Quinn
- Running time: 90 minutes
- Production company: Unified Film Organization (UFO)

Original release
- Network: Sci Fi Channel
- Release: June 28, 2008

Copperhead is a 2008 American horror Western film directed by Todor Chapkanov. It stars Brad Johnson, Keith Stone, Brad Greenquist, Wendy Carter, Gabriel Womack, and Billy Drago. The film aired on the Sci Fi Channel on June 28, 2008, and the sister company from Universal Pictures.

== Plot ==
The film begins with an outlaw named "Wild Bill" riding onto an apparent battlefield. He finds an elderly Mexican, who asks him "what happened" in Spanish "Qué pasa aqui?". He replies, "La Serpienta Del Diablo." Bill then walks to a carriage, a woman falls out, a copperhead slithers out, and Bill shoots it with his gun. He then rides away.

The Next Day, Bill arrives in a town in New Mexico. He walks into the saloon to get a drink, and asks for John Murphy. The bartender named Garrett tells him that Murphy is dead. After he finishes, a cowboy named Jesse demands a poker game with Bill. Jesses' men Will, Roscoe, and "Ponce" hold Bill at gunpoint when Bill tries to tell Jesse that an swarm of highly aggressive snakes are headed straight for the town. Jesse says that if the snakes do not come they will have a gunfight, which they do. Jesse is shot in the chest. Bill is shot in the arm. Jesses' men start shooting at Bill, and Garrett, doctor Josiah, and blacksmith Tannen stop them at gunpoint. Jesse is told to leave, and takes Bill's horse and rides off to Lincoln.

Josiah patches Bill's arm, and they discover the horses, and Henry in the stable have been killed by the snakes. The snakes attack the saloon, and they kill them. They see the swarm coming from over a mountain, and Bill's horse shows up dying, and Bill shoots his horse. Bill tells Sheriff Mercer to give all men every weapon he has in his office. Will, his girlfriend Jane, and saloon girl Darla put school teacher Ms. Murphy, the women and children into the bank safe for safety. Tannen introduces them to his Blacksmith shop, and shows them a Gatling gun, and a flamethrower from the war. They create a pool to corner the snakes. At night the snakes do come, and they start shooting them. Suddenly, a massive swarm shows up, Tannen is killed, and they cover in the saloon. Bill, Will, Roscoe, and "Ponce" go up into Murphy's room. They find blood on his bed, and his gold watch. "Ponce" is killed by snakes by the window. Bill, and Will discovers that Roscoe is responsible for murder of Murphy. They lock him in the room. The snakes emerges from the floor, and Darla is killed. They discover a wall (that isn't very thick enough) that leads to the hotel, and break through. Will, and Garrett go and get the dynamite from the shed in the ally, and kill a snake hiding behind the door. They kill another snake by square dancing on it. The snakes break through the window in the room, they run through the wall to the hotel for safety. Bill gives Will his gun, and Will shoots the dynamite, and destroys the snakes.

In the morning, Bill, Will, Garrett, Jane, Josiah, and Mercer celebrate a drink for Murphy. Josiah realize the snakes are just babies. They encounter Roscoe (who has survived the explosion) holding a pair of guns at them. Suddenly, a giant 40 foot mother copperhead emerges from the ground and eats Roscoe. They run for the Sheriffs' office to take cover from the snake. Mercer tells them to tie the dynamite to Jane, leave her in the street when the snake comes to eat her, kaboom!. Bill punches him and throws him in the cell and locks him in. Bill comes up with a plan to kill the snake. They run for the Blacksmith, Bill finds a length of chain, and Will finds fireplace pokers, they can use to shoot the snake with the Gatling gun. As Mercer inside the cell reaches the keys to free himself, the snake emerges from the ground, and chases Will. Bill throws the chain onto the snakes' neck. Bill finds his boots caught in the chain, and the snake drags him. Garrett starts shooting the fireplace pokers into the snakes' neck, and Jane fires a shotgun at the snakes' side. The snake almost eats Jane, and then destroys the Gatling gun with her head. Bill grabs the shotgun, shoots the snake in the back, then shoots the snake in the mouth, and kills it. Mercer comes out holding a gun and Bill's wanted poster and the snake crushes him.

The Pinkertons arrive looking for Bill, and Garrett tells them a secret that Bill is Murphy. Bill tells the Pinkertons that there's some women and children locked in the bank safe inside. As the Pinkertons go inside to get the women and children out, Bill, Will, Garrett, Jane, and Josiah steal their horses. Bill rides off west, and the others ride off to Lincoln. The Pinkertons start shooting at their escapers and Ms. Murphy finds her fathers' gold watch. She turns and sees Bill on his horse in the sunset.

== Cast ==
- Brad Johnson as Wild Bill Longley
- Keith Stone as Will Bonney
- Brad Greenquist as Garrett
- Wendy Carter as Jane
- Gabriel Womack as Roscoe Burrell
- Billy Drago as Jesse Evans
- Atanas Srebrev as Josiah
- Todd Jensen as Sheriff Mercer
- Violeta Markovska as Darla
- George Zlatarev as Ponciano "Ponce" Domingues
- Nick Harveyas Tannen
- Marta Kondova as Ms. Murphy
- Nathan Bautista as Henry
- Kalina Green as Child
- Vlado Kolev as Pinkerton #1
- Vlado Mihailov as Pinkerton #2 (Vlado Mihaylov)

== Reception ==
Dread Central said, "Nothing groundbreaking. Just a slight deviation from the same old, same old." Slant Magazine rated it one star, saying, "The fact that this instantly musty museum piece leads, after an agonizing hour and 45 minutes, to a simple-minded sermon on loving thy neighbor merely adds insult to injury."

== See also ==
- List of killer snake films
