= Frank Coe (Lincoln County War) =

American Old West figure (1851–1931)

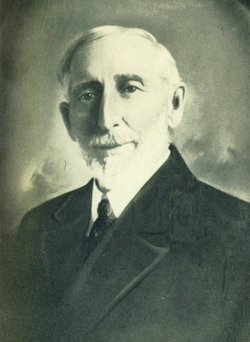
- Born: c. 1851; Marshall County, Virginia, U.S.
- Died: September 16, 1931 (aged 79); Lincoln County, New Mexico, U.S.
- Occupation: Rancher
- Years active: 1871–1880

Benjamin Franklin “Frank” Coe (October 1, 1851 – September 16, 1931) was an American Old West cowboy, gunman, and member of the Lincoln County Regulators.

== Early years ==
Benjamin Franklin Coe was born in western Virginia on October 1, 1851. In 1871 he ventured to New Mexico Territory with his cousin, George Coe, where they worked on the ranch of another cousin. For a time they lived near Raton, New Mexico. In July 1876, Coe and Ab Saunders tracked down and killed outlaw cattle rustler Nicas Meras in the Baca Canyon. On July 18, 1876, both the Coe cousins, along with Doc Scurlock, Charlie Bowdre, and Saunders, broke into the Lincoln jail and grabbed an alleged horse thief, Jesus Largo, from Sheriff Saturnino Baco. They took Largo outside of town and hanged him.

== Lincoln County War ==
The Lincoln County War broke out following the murder of a merchant, John Tunstall, that sparked the regional conflict. The Coes sided with the Lincoln County Regulators, part of the Alexander McSween faction. The Regulators faced off against Sheriff William J. Brady, and allied hired gunmen from the Jesse Evans and the John Kinney gangs. Coe was present during the Gunfight at Blazer's Mill where Buckshot Roberts was shot and killed by the Regulators. It is reported that Coe had attempted to convince Roberts to surrender before the shooting started. His cousin George supposedly fired the fatal shot, although that is disputed. Fellow Regulators Charlie Bowdre, John Middleton, William H. "Billy the Kid" Bonney, and Scurlock were wounded in the shootout, while their leader, Dick Brewer, was killed.

=== Arrest ===
Frank Coe was captured on April 29, 1878, by a posse led by Evans, that included members of both the Evans gang and the Seven Rivers Warriors. During the capture, Regulator Frank McNab was killed, and Saunders was badly wounded. Coe escaped sometime prior to the Battle of Lincoln which occurred in July of that year.

== Later years and death ==
After the Lincoln County War ended Coe left New Mexico, living for a time in Colorado and Nebraska. He returned in 1884, and bought a ranch where he lived the remainder of his life. Between his departure and return he had been arrested in Santa Fe, New Mexico for the murder of Roberts. It was determined, however, that he had been mistaken for his cousin George. In 1880, he was suspected of taking part in another lynching, but was never charged. He and his wife, Helena Anne Tully, lived together for fifty years and raised six children.

=== 1898 murder charge ===
In October 1898, Frank Coe shot and killed Irvine Lesnet, who was dating Coe's 16-year-old daughter, Sydney (1882–1955). After about 18 months of court proceedings and trials, Coe was acquitted of the murder charge.

Coe died September 16, 1931, in Lincoln County.
