= Fred Waite =

American cowboy (1853–1895)

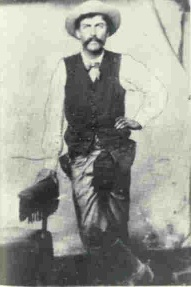
- Born: September 23, 1853; Fort Arbuckle, Indian Territory, United States
- Died: September 24, 1895 (aged 42); Chickasaw Nation, Oklahoma, United States
- Occupation: Cowboy
- Organization: Lincoln County Regulators

Frederick Tecumseh "Dash" Waite, occasionally spelled Fred Wayte (September 23, 1853 – September 24, 1895) (Chickasaw) was noted for a period when he was a cowboy in New Mexico and a member of Billy the Kid's gang. He was also known for later serving as a legislator in the Chickasaw Nation government, and as its Attorney General.

As a young man, Waite left Indian Territory to work as a cowboy in the New Mexico Territory. While working for John Tunstall as a ranch hand, he met Bill Bonney and several other men. After Tunstall was killed in the Lincoln County War, Bonney, Waite and the others pursued Tunstall's killers as vigilantes, calling themselves the Regulators. As they turned to criminal activities, they became known as the "Billy the Kid gang."

In 1880 at about age 27, Waite left the gang and returned to the Chickasaw Nation to build a more settled life. He married, became a rancher, and started a family. He lived a law-abiding life thereafter and became involved in Choctaw and Chickasaw politics. He was elected to the Chickasaw legislature both as a representative and as a senator. When serving as a representative, he was elected for three sessions as Speaker of the House. He was appointed by the council and chief as Attorney General of the Chickasaw Nation. He died of rheumatism at the age of 42.

== Early life ==
Fred Waite's middle name of Tecumseh was after a prominent Native leader. He was born in the Chickasaw Nation at Fort Arbuckle, in what is now Garvin County, Oklahoma. He was the son of Catherine (née McClure) Waite and Thomas Fletcher Waite. His father was a farmer who also operated a trading store and stage stop southeast of Pauls Valley in the Chickasaw Nation, Indian Territory. His mother was mixed race (as was he and his siblings) and his maternal grandparents were Ela "Ellen" Teecha (Chickasaw) and the Rev. A.J. McClure, an English missionary who immigrated to the Nation to serve the Chickasaw. The missionary met and married Ela Teecha after he arrived in the Chickasaw nation.

During the Civil War, the Waite family supported the Union. They were pursued by Confederate soldiers as the conflict reached the Nation, and fled to the Sac and Fox reservation in Kansas, which supported the Union. After the war, they returned to Indian Territory.

Reportedly, Fred was sent to school first at the Illinois Industrial University, for education in European-American ways. He moved to St. Louis, Missouri, where he graduated from Mound City Commercial College in 1874. After his father's death, Waite returned to the Fort Arbuckle to manage the family store. He also managed a crew of thirty ranch hands who were looking after about a thousand head of cattle.

== Life in New Mexico ==
As Fred grew older, he decided to become a cowboy. He left home in 1875, intending to go to Colorado. He wound up in Lincoln County, New Mexico, where he got a job as a ranch hand with John Chisum in 1877. Waite later worked for John Tunstall, a rancher who was later to be one of the leaders of the Tunstall-McSween vs. Dolan war, better known as the Lincoln County War. Waite worked as a farmer for Tunstall.

On February 18, 1878, after Tunstall was killed, Waite became a member of the Regulators. They originally collected as a posse led by Dick Brewer to serve arrest warrants on Tunstall's killers. Through the posse, Waite met Billy Bonney, Jose Chavez y Chavez (American Indian), Henry Brown, Jim French, and Charlie Bowdre. They later formed what became known as Billy the Kid's gang, led by Bonney.

The gang came into conflict with law enforcement and also attacked a suspect in Tunstall's murder. Waite was allegedly behind a wall with the gang when they killed William J. Brady, sheriff of Lincoln County, New Mexico. He was also present when the gang killed Buckshot Roberts, a suspect in the murder of Tunstall.

== Return to Indian Territory ==
Waite was said to have stayed with the Regulators long enough to become the subject of one county and two federal arrest warrants. The gang split up, and Waite headed back to Indian Territory. He settled in the Washita Valley. He married Mary E. Thompson on December 1, 1881, moved to the Chickasaw Nation, and started a family.

== Serving the Chickasaw ==
Determined to turn his life around, Waite tried several different occupations. First, he began ranching, then he worked as a lawman for the U.S. Indian Police. They had jurisdiction for certain crimes under federal law.

Waite became involved in tribal politics. He became a delegate to an inter-tribal conference. He was elected as a representative from his home district, and then as a senator in the Chickasaw government. It had two houses for its legislature. While serving as representative, he was elected by other members as Speaker of the House for three sessions. After that he was appointed by the chief as Attorney General of the Chickasaw Nation. While in this position, he died of rheumatism on September 24, 1895.
