= Henry Newton Brown =

American Old West gunman

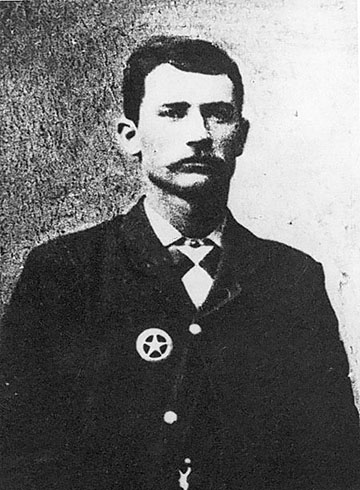
- Born: 1857 near Rolla, Missouri
- Died: April 30, 1884 (aged 26–27); Medicine Lodge, Kansas
- Cause of death: Gunshot wound
- Other name: none
- Occupation: Lawman Gunfighter Gambler
- Spouse: Alice Maude Levagood
- Children: Unknown
- Parent(s): Jasper and Aldamira Richardson (Uncle and Aunt)
- Criminal charges: Bank robbery

Henry Newton Brown (1857 – April 30, 1884) was an American Old West gunman who played the roles of both lawman and outlaw during his life.

Brown was raised in Cold Springs Township, in Phelps County, ten miles south of Rolla, Missouri. An orphan, he lived there with his uncle Jasper and aunt Aldamira Richardson until the age of seventeen, when he left home and headed west. He drifted through various cowboy jobs in Colorado and Texas, supposedly killing a man in a gunfight in the Texas Panhandle.

== Lincoln County War ==
In 1877, Brown landed in the New Mexico Territory, and became embroiled in the Lincoln County War. Brown joined Billy the Kid and cowboys as the "Lincoln County Regulators", working John Tunstall's Rio Feliz Ranch.

On April 1, 1878, Brown, Billy the Kid, Jim French, Frank McNab, John Middleton and Fred Waite ambushed and murdered Lincoln County Sheriff William Brady, who was indirectly responsible for the death of Tunstall. Three days later, at the Gunfight at Blazer's Mill, Brown and the Regulators engaged in a gunfight with Buckshot Roberts, another man they believed involved in Tunstall's murder. Roberts received a serious gunshot wound from Charlie Bowdre which later proved to be fatal, but not before he managed to kill the Regulators' nominal leader, Richard M. Brewer. Retreating into proprietor Blazer's office, Roberts continued a prolonged firefight with Brown and the Regulators. He died the next day.

The Regulators — fugitives now for the Brady killing — spent the next several months in hiding. Then on July 15, 1878, they became trapped, along with one of Tunstall's partners, Alexander McSween, in McSween's home in Lincoln by members of "The House" and some of Brady's men. Henry Brown was one of three Regulators not actually in McSween's house at the time, but instead was sniping at Brady's men from a grain warehouse behind the Tunstall store. He escaped with Billy the Kid and the others when the siegers set fire to the house. McSween was shot down while fleeing the blaze, and his death essentially marked the end of the Lincoln County Cattle War.

== Outlaw to lawman ==
In the fall of that year, Brown, Billy the Kid, and a few of the remaining Regulators trailed a herd of rustled horses to the little town of Tascosa in the Texas Panhandle. After the horses were sold the Regulators returned to their old haunts, but Brown, named in two murder warrants in the state of New Mexico, wisely remained in Texas where he eventually became a lawman. It has not been established whether he was a deputy sheriff of Oldham County, Texas; Marshal of Tascosa or a constable. He had a quick temper and was quickly dismissed because he "was always wanting to fight and get his mane up."

Brown thereafter drifted through the (Oklahoma) Indian Territory and into Kansas, working on ranches. In July 1882, when about 25 years old, he settled in Caldwell, Kansas—a rough cattle town comparable to Dodge City and Abilene—where he was first appointed Assistant Marshal of the city; then promoted to marshal about five months later. The Chisholm Trail met the Santa Fe tracks in Caldwell and as the terminus of the trail, it had a long history of violence. Brown, an outlaw turned lawman, and Ben Wheeler, who had been a former Texas lawman turned outlaw, joined forces (with Wheeler as Assistant Marshal) and effectively cleaned up the town.

Brown was described by contemporaries as a "very much undersize" man who didn't smoke, drink, chew, or gamble, and was noted to be in regular attendance at the Methodist Church. Said to be "exceedingly modest and, in fact, bashful," he displayed an introvert presence but "gained the entire confidence of the people . . . and . . . conducted himself in such a manner that the doors of society were always open to him."

But, "he had a square set jaw, not unlike that of a bull dog" and "his face indicated firmness and a lack of physical fear." "His words were few and parted with reluctantly," and when duty called, Brown's demeanor changed immediately. He was easily angered: his temper flared instantly and his outwardly meek manner transformed into one of deadly grave purpose. One contemporary commented that "he was a two-gun man. He could take a six-shooter in each hand and make one think a battle was on."

From the grateful community, in appreciation for his service, he was given an extensively engraved, gold and silver mounted Winchester rifle. A silver medallion was affixed to the stock inscribed: "Presented to City Marshal H. N. Brown For valuable services rendered In behalf of the Citizens of Caldwell Kas A. N. Colson Mayor Dec 1882"

Brown killed a gambler, Newt Boyce, with the rifle (in the line of duty) on December 16, 1883. Another killing attributed to Brown in Caldwell was that of Spotted Horse, a renegade Indian.

Henry Brown gained status in the higher realms of Caldwell society when he married Alice Maude Levagood, the daughter of a well-to-do Caldwell brick maker. Alice had a college degree―rare for females of that era.

Marshal Brown and his assistant kept the town clean, and by the time they were reappointed to a new term they were lauded by the citizens as the best and most effective team of lawmen the town had ever had.

== The Medicine Valley bank robbery ==
In April 1884, Brown and Wheeler concocted a story convincing the mayor to give them leave to travel into the Indian Territory to hunt a murderer. With two Cherokee Outlet cowboys, William Smith and John Wesley, they rode to Medicine Lodge, Kansas, and attempted to rob the Medicine Valley Bank. Almost immediately, their attempt fell apart in disaster when gunfire erupted and two of the bank officers were shot. Most conventional accounts name Brown as bank president Wylie Payne's murderer. But T. A. McNeal, author of When Kansas Was Young, sat at his friend Payne's bedside as he lay dying and reports that Payne named Wesley as his killer. Wheeler (and possibly, Wesley) shot George Geppert, the bank's chief cashier who, just before he died, sealed the vault, preventing the robbers from escaping with any money.

Brown and the outlaws fled under fire, pursued by a posse composed of 12 cowboys that happened to be in a stable directly across the street from the bank. The four fugitives were caught when one of their horses gave out.

Later, incarcerated in the town's small jail, they anticipated a lynch mob, and were offered the opportunity to write letters to their loved ones. Brown did write a poignant letter to his wife. It read in part: "Darling Wife: I am in jail here. Four of us tried to rob the bank here and one man shot one of the men in the bank. I want you to come and see me as soon as you can. I will send you all of my things and you can sell them. But keep the Winchester. It is hard for me to write this letter, but it was all for you, my sweet wife, and for the love I have for you. "Do not go back on me. If you do it will kill me. Be true to me as long as you live, and come to see me if you think enough of me. My love is just the same as it always was. Oh, how I did hate to leave you last Sunday evening. But I did not think this would happen. I thought we could take in the money and not have any trouble with it, but a man's fondest hopes are sometimes broken with trouble. We would not have been arrested but one of our horses gave out and we could not leave him [the rider] alone. I do not know what to write. Do the best you can with everything. I want you to send me some clothes. Sell all the things you don't need. Have your picture taken and send it to me. Now, my dear wife, go and see Mr. Witzleben and Mr. Nyce and get the money. If a mob does not kill us we will come out all right after while. Maude, I did not shoot anyone and didn't want the others to kill anyone. But they did and that is all there is about it. Now, my darling wife, goodbye. H. N. Brown."

== Death ==
Realizing that a lynching was imminent, Wesley removed his boot and with it, the shackle of the leg-iron with which he had been hobbled to Brown. Brown tied the loose end of the leg-iron to his leg with his bandana allowing him to run unencumbered. Smith, handcuffed to Wheeler, was able to slip the handcuff over his hand resulting, unknown to the gathering mob, in all four being free. When the lynch mob came at 9 pm and opened the door, Brown burst through the startled lynch mob to an alley alongside the jail. As he ran past, he was fatally blasted with both barrels of a shotgun at almost point blank range. Wheeler ran about 100 yards before being horribly wounded in a barrage of gunfire but lived long enough to hang with Smith and Wesley shortly afterward when the three were lynched on an elm tree by the mob.

== Other media ==
In the 1970 film Chisum, when Billy proposes robbing Murphy's bank to help avenge his murdered employer, Tom O'Folliard recommends Brown as a man to recruit for the raid. Brown is played by an uncredited actor during the climactic battle, and it's unclear whether he is one of the five surviving members of Billy's gang.

In the 1990 film Young Guns II Henry Brown was combined with fellow Regulator Jim French and presented as a composite named Hendry William French. Timid and clumsy, the film's portrayal of French by actor Alan Ruck bears little actual resemblance to either outlaw.

The actor William Smith played Brown in the 1969 episode "The Restless Man" of the syndicated television series Death Valley Days, hosted by Robert Taylor.

== Sources ==
- Nash, Robert (1994). Encyclopedia of Western Lawmen & Outlaws. Da Capo Press. ISBN 0-306-80591-X.
- O'Neal, Bill (1980). Henry Brown: The Outlaw-Marshal.
- Sifakis, Carl (1982). Encyclopedia of American Crime. Facts on File Inc.
- Nolan, Frederick, The Lincoln County War, University of Oklahoma Press, 1992
- Graterri, Len; Cook, Rod; Williams, James, William Sherod Robinson alias Ben Wheeler, Eakin Press, 2010. ISBN 978-1-935632-00-9.
