= Battle of Lincoln =

The Battle of Lincoln may refer to one of the following:

- Battle of Lincoln (1141), at Lincoln Castle in Lincoln, England
- Battle of Lincoln (1217), at Lincoln Castle in Lincoln, England
- Battle of Lincoln (1878), in Lincoln County, New Mexico, United States
