= James Dolan (rancher) =

American Old West businessman and cattleman (1848–1898)

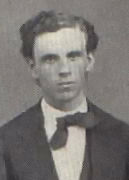
- James Dolan, circa 1870s
- Born: James Joseph Dolan; May 2, 1848; Loughrea, County Galway, Ireland
- Died: February 26, 1898 (aged 49); Lincoln County, New Mexico
- Occupations: Old West businessman and member of the Santa Fe Ring, racketeer, cattleman, politician.
- Known for: Instigator of the Lincoln County War

James Joseph Dolan (May 2, 1848 – February 6, 1898) was a Union Army veteran, Grand Army of the Republic member, Republican Party political boss, racketeer, Old West businessman and gunman, cattle baron, and a key figure in the Lincoln County War, in New Mexico, which launched Billy the Kid to fame.

== Early life and Murphy association ==
Dolan was born in Loughrea, County Galway, Ireland, and moved to the United States at the age of five with his family. He served in the Union Army from 1863 until the Civil War's end, after which he moved to Lincoln County, New Mexico. He worked as a clerk for Lawrence Murphy, and, by 1874, the two men were business partners in a mercantile and banking operation. The venture was highly successful and profitable, particularly since there was no competition.

In May 1873, Dolan attempted to shoot Captain James Randlett of the US Cavalry at Fort Stanton, resulting in "L. G. Murphy & Co." being evicted from the fort. On May 9, 1877, Dolan killed Hicripario Jaramillo, claiming that the latter had charged him with a knife. George Peppin, a recent friend, later married Jaramillo's widow.

It would be the only killing he would personally commit, preferring thereafter to hire others to commit acts of violence under his direction. By this time, however, Dolan had become close friends with Sheriff William J. Brady, with whom he had a close alliance. Because of the lack of competition, the Murphy-Dolan businesses charged high prices for their goods, which led to hatred from local farmers and ranchers.

To counter this, in 1876 John Tunstall, a middle class businessman from London, and Alexander McSween, a Presbyterian lawyer from Canada, opened a competing business, with the support of John Chisum, a cattle baron. The general store and bank, called "J. H. Tunstall & Co", was located near to the Murphy-Dolan businesses, in Lincoln, New Mexico, and enraged Dolan. In letters to his family in London, Tunstall said that he intended to not only unseat Murphy and Dolan, but also to build the same kind of business monopoly that they had once enjoyed. Tunstall also wrote that his intention was to become so powerful that half of every dollar earned by anyone in Lincoln County would find its way into his pocket.

Dolan challenged Tunstall to a gunfight, but the latter refused, as he preferred to let others do the killing for him.

Preparing for war, Dolan hired members of the Seven Rivers Warriors, the Jesse Evans Gang and the John Kinney Gang.

In response, Tunstall and McSween formed a gang of their own called the Lincoln County Regulators. The ranks included Richard "Dick" Brewer, Charlie Bowdre, Billy the Kid, Doc Scurlock, George Coe and Frank Coe.

== Lincoln County War ==
On February 18, 1878, Tunstall was shot and killed, officially while resisting arrest, by Deputies Jesse Evans, William Morton, Tom Hill and Frank Baker. This led to what would become known as the Lincoln County War, one of the most famous range wars.

Although Dolan was suspected of ordering the killing, Sheriff Brady did nothing.

Alex McSween then took command of the Regulators, which included the primary protagonists of Tunstall, who were deputized to capture and bring in Evans, Morton, Baker and Hill. William Morton and Frank Baker were captured on March 6 by the Regulators, who on March 9, 1878, executed them both when the group was surprised by Dolan-Murphy cowboys, along with fellow Regulator William McCloskey, who was suspected of having betrayed the Regulators and of being on Dolan's payroll. That same day Evans and Hill attempted to disperse sheep on a local farm, and Hill was killed by the sheep farmer, while Evans was wounded.

During that period, Dolan offered a $1000 reward for anyone who would kill Alexander McSween.

On April 1, 1878, the Regulators ambushed and murdered Sheriff Brady and Deputy George W. Hindman. According to Robert Marshall Utley, the murder of Sheriff Brady was ordered by Alexander McSween, who had learned that the Sheriff was carrying an arrest warrant for him. As Sheriff Brady and Deputy Hindman lay dead, Regulator Billy the Kid ran from the place of ambush in order to remove the arrest warrant from the Sheriff's pocket. Instead, the Kid was driven back and wounded by the gunfire of one of Sheriff Brady's Deputies.

Several killings followed, committed by both the Regulators and the gunmen hired by Dolan, who were often led by Jesse Evans. John Copeland was appointed to replace Brady, but when he refused to side with either faction, preferring to remain neutral and deal with both sides accordingly, he was dismissed and replaced by George Peppin, who was plainly on the side of the Murphy-Dolan faction. The range war lasted through July, 1878, culminating in the Battle of Lincoln.

== Aftermath ==
When the range war ended, Susan McSween hired attorney Huston Chapman to pursue charges against Dolan and others, in addition to working toward amnesty for the Regulators. On February 18, 1879, one year to the day after Tunstall was murdered, Evans and Billy Campbell killed Chapman, then fled the territory. That murder also was attributed to Dolan, though his involvement was never proven. Dolan was indicted for the murder of Tunstall, but was acquitted.

== Last years ==
Dolan later suffered from alcoholism, but did serve as the Lincoln County Treasurer for a time, as well as in the Territorial Senate. He died on his ranch in 1898, aged 49, having finally acquired all of Tunstall's property as well. Much of the land was later expropriated by the Federal government as part of land conservation with the substantial remainder later being sold off.
