= Yginio Salazar =

Lincoln County Regulator (1863–1936)

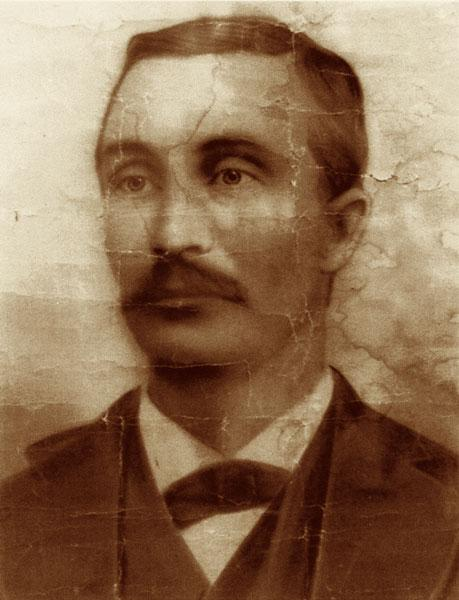
- Yginio Salazar in his mid-to-late-20s
- Born: February 14, 1863; Valencia County, New Mexico, United States
- Died: January 7, 1936 (aged 72); Lincoln County, United States
- Resting place: Lincoln Cemetery
- Organization: Lincoln County Regulators

Yginio Salazar (February 14, 1863 - January 7, 1936) was a member of the Lincoln County Regulators during the Lincoln County War. Although he is sometimes referred to as the youngest of the Lincoln County Regulators, this is almost certainly in error. An error listing his birthday on his gravestone is a primary source of this error, but frequent references to Yginio Salazar as "the young Salazar" imply that he was among the youngest. In fact, although he was young he was almost certainly older than his friend Billy the Kid.

== Childhood ==
Salazar was probably born on 14 Feb 1858 (or 1857) in Valencia County, New Mexico. In the 1860 census of Valencia County, he is listed as age 2 in the household as the son of Teofilo and Paula (Paubla) Salazar in the Quara & Cienga area. Also listed in this household are siblings Lugarda (12), Francisco (8), Magencia (6) Romulo (5) and José (2). This conflicts with the popularly cited birth year of 1863 (and the year on his gravestone), but the 1860 census in which he is listed and 1880 census records and the age distribution of siblings make a birth year after 1860 impossible.

His father Teofilo evidently died and his mother remarried prior to 1880. Yginio is listed in the 1880 census of Las Tablas, Lincoln County as a stepson in the family of Francisco and Paula Luma, along with his brothers Romulo and José, also listed in the 1860 Valencia County census. The older siblings had either died or left the household by 1880.

He grew up on the Hondo River, but his family eventually settled a few miles west of Lincoln. Yginio learned how to play the fiddle when he was little and was hired to play at a dance at Fort Stanton and was paid $50 for doing it. Also, Yginio became a skilled horseman and good with a rifle and pistol.

== Lincoln County War and beyond ==
Yginio met Billy the Kid, and looked up to him as a role model. The only battle Yginio fought in during the Lincoln County War was the Five-Day Battle and was one of the fourteen Regulators inside the McSween house. When the Regulators had to flee the burning home, he was shot in the back and shoulder and pretended to be dead so he wouldn't be shot again. He crawled to his sister-in-law's house, a half-mile away from Lincoln, and was treated by the Fort Stanton doctor, Dan Appel. Yginio later became an honest rancher. After Billy the Kid escaped from jail in Lincoln, killing his two guards, he fled to Yginio's home where Salazar provided food and water while Billy the Kid camped nearby.

== Later life ==
Yginio Salazar cannot be located in the 1885 Territorial Census. The 1900 Lincoln County census introduces a mystery regarding the date of Yginio's marriage to Isabel Paniague of Lincoln County. The census lists the household of Yginio Salazar married to Isabel (age 35, born May 1865). A daughter Pilar is listed as age 18, born November, 1881. Isabel is shown to be the mother of one child with that child still living. However, the census also records that Yginio and Isabel have been married only FOUR years (1896).

The 1910 Lincoln, Lincoln County census shows Yginio, now age 50 is shown as being married once but Isabel (now age 45) as married twice. The census records show that Isabel was the mother of NO children, and shows that Yginio and Isabel have been married for 12 years (1898).

Despite the census note, Yginio Salazar probably married Isabel in Lincoln County between 1896 and 1898. He was her second husband and they may have had no children together. Yginio spoke both English and Spanish and could read and write. Isabel spoke only Spanish and could not read nor write

He continued to farm in Lincoln County until his death on January 7, 1936. He was buried alongside his wife in the Lincoln Cemetery and his headstone still reads "Pal of Billy the Kid."
