= Frank McNab =

American outlaw (died 1878)

- Born: Scotland
- Died: April 29, 1878; New Mexico Territory
- Cause of death: Gunshot wound
- Occupations: Cattle rustler; outlaw

Frank McNab (or MacNab) (d. 29 April 1878) was a member of the Regulators who fought on behalf of John Tunstall during the Lincoln County War.

Of Scottish origin, McNab was a "cattle detective" who worked for Hunter, Evans, & Company, which was managed by New Mexico cattleman John Chisum. McNab's job was to track down those who stole Chisum's cattle. Drifting into Lincoln County from the Texas Panhandle in the mid-1870s, he soon signed on with John Tunstall, as his rivals, a group of cattlemen and cowboys from the Seven Rivers area of Lincoln County were allied with Lawrence Murphy and James Dolan.

With Tunstall's murder and the outbreak of war, McNab took a prominent position in the Regulator chain of command, second only to foreman Richard "Dick" Brewer. McNab, along with other deputized Regulators, captured Dolan gunmen William Morton and Frank Baker.

As Morton was believed to have been one of those who killed John Tunstall, his fate looked grim, especially when the Regulators and their prisoners detoured on their way to Lincoln into the Capitan foothills. Although the Regulators were intent on killing Morton and Baker rather than turning them over for trial, one of their number, William McCloskey, was friendly with Morton and tried to talk the Regulators out of killing him. On March 9, 1878, the Regulators made their move along the Blackwater Creek. According to Pat Garrett's biography of Billy the Kid, McNab shot McCloskey in the head when he tried to stop the imminent execution of Morton and Baker, who then spurred their mounts and tried to escape before being gunned down by Billy the Kid.

McNab was one of the triggermen in the killing of Sheriff Brady and his deputy George W. Hindman in Lincoln on April 1, 1878, and was present three days later when they shot it out with Buckshot Roberts. Upon Dick Brewer's death during the Blazer's Mill shootout, McNab was elected captain of the Regulators, but his leadership was very short. On April 29, 1878, McNab, Ab Saunders, and Frank Coe were on their way to the latter's ranch. Nine miles below Lincoln, they stopped at the Fritz ranch for a break when they were ambushed by Seven Rivers cowboys, and members of the Jesse Evans Gang, all under the direction of newly appointed Sheriff George Peppin.

Saunders was shot through the hip. Also wounded, McNab scrambled up a gully and tried to get away until a cowboy named Manuel "Indian" Segovia caught up with him and shotgunned him to death. Frank Coe surrendered after a shouted parley. In the wake of McNab's death, Doc Scurlock was elected captain of the Regulators.

== Posthumous ==
McNab's death was avenged several weeks later on May 15, when the Regulators invaded the Seven Rivers area and captured Segovia. He made a futile attempt to escape only to be gunned down by Billy the Kid and Josefita Chavez.

== Bibliography ==
- Billy the Kid: A Short and Violent Life, by Robert M. Utley, University of Nebraska Press, 1989.
- Nolan, F.W. (2009). The Lincoln County War: A Documentary History. Southwest heritage series. Sunstone Press. ISBN 978-0-86534-721-2.
