= Lawrence Murphy =

Irish-American Union Army veteran, politician, and mobster

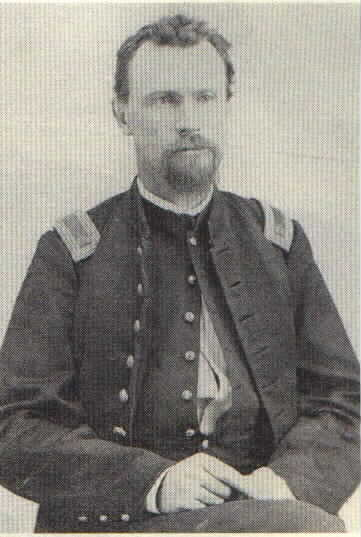
- Murphy c. 1861-1862
- Born: 1831; County Wexford, Ireland
- Died: October 20, 1878 (aged 46–47); Lincoln County, New Mexico
- Occupations: Old West businessman and member of the Santa Fe Ring
- Known for: Main instigator of the Lincoln County War

Lawrence Gustave Murphy (1831 – October 20, 1878) was an Irish immigrant to the United States, Union Army veteran, Grand Army of the Republic member, Republican Party ward heeler, racketeer, Old West businessman and gunman, and a main instigator of the Lincoln County War.

== Early life ==
Murphy was born in County Wexford, Ireland, and as a young adult moved to the United States. He enlisted in the United States Army, from 1851 to 1855, and re-enlisted in 1856.

After he was discharged in 1861, he ventured to Santa Fe, New Mexico, and reenlisted once again in the Union Army. He served for the duration of the Civil War, but saw little, if any, combat.

He mustered out at Fort Stanton in 1866 and quickly joining the Grand Army of the Republic which united Union Army veterans as auxiliaries of the Republican Party in Reconstruction America.

He established relationships with other well-connected G.A.R. members and went into business with German immigrant Emil Fritz. Due to Murphy's connections, the partners immediately began securing military contracts to supply beef, vegetables, and other supplies to the Apache Reservation.

They also hatched schemes to sell land they did not own to unsuspecting farmers. This, however, was common practice at the time and, in Santa Fe, the capital of the Territory of New Mexico, "a specialized legal profession had grown up around the manipulation of title" to “old Spanish and Mexican land grants."

Murphy eventually moved to Lincoln County, New Mexico, and in 1869 he started "L. G. Murphy & Co." In 1873, Murphy hired James Dolan, a fellow Irish immigrant from Loughrea, County Galway. By 1874, Murphy and Dolan had become business partners in a highly profitable mercantile and banking operation. The business saw success mainly due to there being no competition. As a member of the Republican Party political machine known as the Santa Fe Ring, Murphy also wielded considerable power over law enforcement, as Lincoln County Sheriff William J. Brady lived on a cattle ranch that he had purchased using money borrowed from Murphy and Dolan's bank.

== Lincoln County War ==
What would become known as the Murphy-Dolan faction charged local farmers and ranchers high prices for their goods, causing them to be resented by many local people.

To counter them, rancher John Tunstall and former Murphy-Dolan lawyer Alexander McSween opened a rival business in 1876, called "J. H. Tunstall & Co".

The Tunstall-McSween faction had the support of powerful rancher John Chisum, and the business enraged James Dolan. With Murphy's support, Dolan hired gunmen to try to goad Tunstall into a fight, employing the Seven Rivers Warriors, the Jesse Evans Gang and the John Kinney Gang.

The gangs began rustling Tunstall's herds or dispersing them which prompted Tunstall to form a gang called the Lincoln County Regulators, which included Dick Brewer, Doc Scurlock, Billy the Kid, and Charlie Bowdre.

On February 18, 1878, while Tunstall was alone, he was shot and killed by Jesse Evans, William Morton, Frank Baker and Tom Hill, likely under the orders of Dolan.

This event sparked the Lincoln County War, one of the best known range wars. To counter Sheriff Brady's lack of action on the murder, McSween took command of the Regulators, having them legally deputized, and tasked with the apprehension of the murderers.

On March 6, 1878, the Regulators captured Morton and Baker. On March 9, 1878, the Regulators executed both men as well as William McCloskey, a fellow Regulator suspected of being a traitor.

On April 1, 1878, the Regulators ambushed and murdered Sheriff Brady and Deputy George W. Hindman. This assassination, according to Robert Marshall Utley, had been ordered by McSween, who had learned that the Sheriff was carrying an arrest warrant for him. As the Sheriff lay dead, Billy the Kid ran from the place of ambush in order to remove the arrest warrant from Brady's pocket. Instead, he was driven back and slightly wounded by the gunfire of one of Brady's Deputies.

Several other killings following this were committed by both the Regulators and the gunmen employed by Murphy-Dolan. The range war culminated in the Battle of Lincoln from July 15–19, 1878.

== Death ==
By that time Murphy was in poor health, suffering from cancer. He was, by this time, having little to do with the day-to-day activities of his businesses or the gunmen under his employ. He died on October 20, 1878, around the age of 47.

== Popular culture ==
- Murphy was portrayed by Forrest Tucker in the 1970 film Chisum.
- Jack Palance portrayed Murphy in the 1988 film Young Guns. Murphy's death was changed to him being killed at the end of the Battle of Lincoln after the Regulators escape. Billy the Kid doubles back and says "Reap it, Murphy, you son of a bitch!" before shooting Murphy between the eyes.
