= George Coe (Lincoln County War) =

Old West cowboy and gunman (1856–1941)

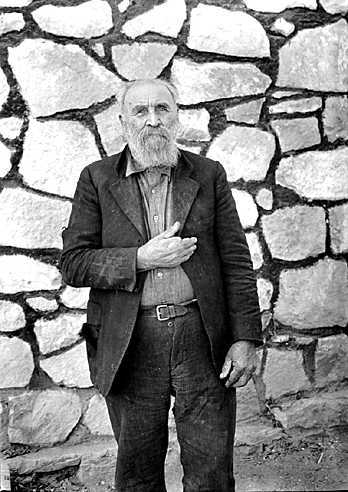
- George W. Coe in 1934 displaying his missing finger
- Born: July 13, 1856; Washington County, Iowa, US
- Died: November 12, 1941 (aged 85); Chaves County, New Mexico, US
- Occupations: Old West cowboy; Gunman; Rancher
- Years active: 1871–1878

George Washington Coe (1856–1941) was an Old West cowboy and a gunman during the Lincoln County War.

== Early years ==
George Washington Coe was born in Brighton, Iowa. He moved to New Mexico Territory with his cousin, Frank Coe, around 1871 to work on a ranch near Fort Stanton belonging to another cousin. For a time they lived near Raton, New Mexico. The two often rode in pursuit of cattle rustlers and horse thieves. On July 18, 1876, he and Frank, accompanied by Doc Scurlock, Charlie Bowdre, and Ab Saunders, forced their way into the Lincoln County jail and took alleged horse thief Jesus Largo from Sheriff Saturnino Baca and lynched him.

By 1878 Coe had leased land in Lincoln County to establish his own ranch. He and his cousin continued to battle rustlers, but now it was often in defense of their own possessions.

== Lincoln County War ==
George Coe was dragged into the Lincoln County War after being arrested by county Sheriff William J. Brady. Coe and his cousin aligned themselves with the Lincoln County Regulators, riding with Billy the Kid, and facing off against the "Murphy-Dolan faction" and their supporters. This included members of the Jesse Evans Gang and the John Kinney Gang. Coe figured prominently in the events of the final Battle of Lincoln between the two factions. He was later arrested for the murder of Buckshot Roberts which had occurred in a shootout known as the Gunfight of Blazer's Mills. In the gunfight, Coe lost his trigger finger.

Coe shot and wounded Seven Rivers Warriors gang member Charles "Dutch Charlie" Kruling in Lincoln on the morning of April 30, 1878, a day after Seven Rivers members had shot and killed the new Regulator leader, Frank McNab, and captured Coe's cousin, Frank. Frank escaped shortly thereafter. The two left the area for a time, living in Nebraska and Colorado before they eventually returned to Lincoln County.

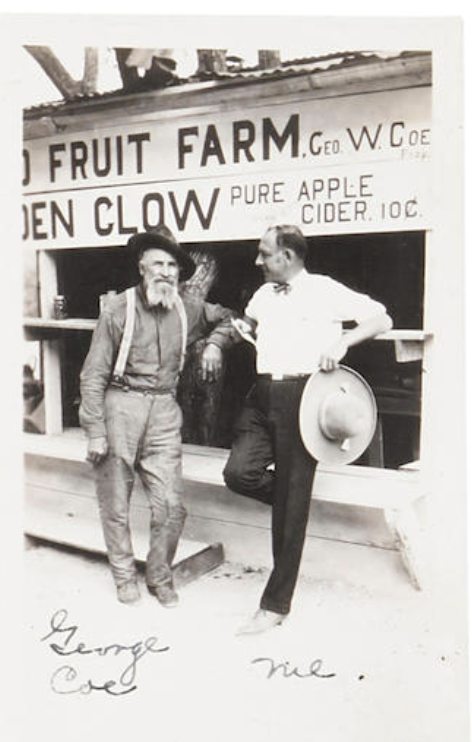
George W. Coe standing in front of his Golden Glow Ranch Fruit Stand with unknown person

== Later life and death ==
Coe was granted amnesty from New Mexico Governor Lew Wallace. In 1884 he started the "Golden Glow Ranch" in Lincoln County and became a prosperous and respected member of the community.

He wrote his autobiography, entitled Frontier Fighter, detailing his association with the Regulators and giving details of certain members' traits and personalities.

Coe died November 12, 1941, in Roswell, New Mexico.
