= San Lorenzo, Rio Arriba County, New Mexico =

Unincorporated community in New Mexico, United States

San Lorenzo, New Mexico
- Unincorporated community
- Location within New Mexico
- Coordinates: 36°02′55″N 106°17′07″W
- Country: United States
- State: New Mexico
- County: Rio Arriba
- Elevation: 7,126 ft (2,172 m)
- Time zone: UTC-7 (Mountain (MST))
  - Summer (DST): UTC-6 (MDT)
- Area code: 575
- GNIS feature ID: 910651

San Lorenzo is an unincorporated community in Rio Arriba County, New Mexico, United States. San Lorenzo is 13 miles (21 km) west-northwest of Española.
