= Tom O'Folliard =

Outlaw and figure in the Lincoln County War (1858–1880)

Tom O. Folliard
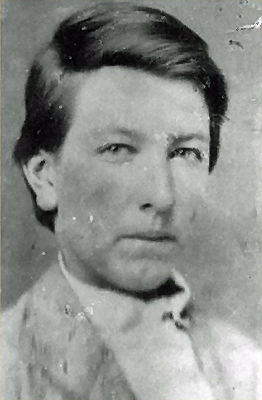
- O. Folliard circa 1875
- Born: Thomas O. Folliard Jr. 1858; Uvalde, Texas, U.S.
- Died: December 19, 1880 (aged 21–22); Fort Sumner, New Mexico Territory
- Cause of death: Gunshot wound
- Resting place: Old Fort Sumner Cemetery; 34°24′13″N 104°11′37″W
- Other name: Tom Folliard
- Occupations: Ranch hand, gunfighter, outlaw
- Parents: Father: Thomas O. Folliard Sr.; Mother: Sarah Cook

Tom O. Folliard (1858 – December 19, 1880) was the best friend of outlaw William Bonney, a.k.a. Billy the Kid. Both were members of the Regulators during the Lincoln County War.

After the war ended, they became cattle rustlers, forming the Bonney gang with fellow outlaws Dave Rudabaugh, Charlie Bowdre, Tom Pickett, and Billy Wilson.

Folliard, a Texan, was a participant in the Lincoln County War and survived the famous Five-Day Battle in Lincoln in July 1878.

He is said to have been wounded by a gunshot to the shoulder while escaping from the McSween residence, which had been set on fire, with Bonney and three others. He was shot in the chest in an ambush by sheriff Pat Garrett on December 19, 1880, at Fort Sumner, dying approximately 45 minutes later. He was interred at Old Fort Sumner Cemetery in a plot he later shared with Bonney and Charlie Bowdre.

As in the photo's caption, Tom's last name was "Folliard," not "O'Folliard." "O" was his middle initial. This is well documented and supported also by the fact that his father had the same name.

== Portrayals in the media ==
- Folliard was portrayed in the 1942 film Apache Trail by William Lundigan.
- In the 1954 film The Law vs. Billy the Kid O'Folliard was played by actor George Berkeley.
- Folliard was also portrayed in the 1958 film The Left Handed Gun by James Best alongside Paul Newman's portrayal of Billy The Kid.
- Christopher Mitchum portrays Folliard in Chisum as a Tunstall cowboy who is friends with Billy the Kid (Geoffrey Deuel). Folliard is a witness, but not an accomplice, to Billy's murder of Tunstall's killers and doesn't fully join Billy until the final act, due to disgust about the large reward that Tunstall's enemies place on Billy's head. Tom survives the Battle of Lincoln, but, unlike in real life, he and Charlie Bowdre decline Billy's offers to accompany him in his subsequent endeavors.
- Folliard appeared in Pat Garrett & Billy the Kid (1973), played by screenwriter Rudy Wurlitzer.
- Folliard was portrayed in the 1990 film Young Guns II by Balthazar Getty as a 14-year-old "tenderfoot" orphan from Pennsylvania who begs his way into Billy the Kid's gang. This was inaccurate, as Folliard was a Texan, never left the southwest and was in his late teens when he joined the Regulators.
- Folliard was not depicted in the original Young Guns film, although in real life he had been present for the majority of the events depicted in the movie and had been one of Billy the Kid's best friends since the two first met.
- Folliard is portrayed by Pepe Johnson in the ongoing (2022-) television series Billy the Kid (TV series) created by Michael Hirst, first appearing in Season 2.
