= Jim French (cowboy) =

American outlaw

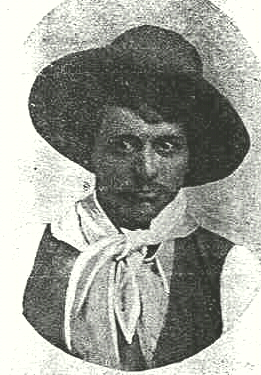
- Possible photo of Jim French, c. 1878
- Occupation: Cowboy
- Organization: Lincoln County Regulators

Jim French was a cowboy in the New Mexico Territory. Called either "Big Jim" or "Frenchy", he was a key participant in the 1878 Lincoln County War.

Out of all Lincoln County Regulators and associates of Billy the Kid, French remains the most mysterious. Not much is known about him, such as where he came from or how he came to work for John Tunstall. He was reported to be a large, powerful man, variously said to be either half-Indian or half-black.

== Lincoln County War ==
French was present at all the key events of the Regulators during the war, including the Blackwater killings of William Morton, Frank Baker, and William McCloskey on March 9, 1878. After the shooting of Sheriff William Brady on April 1, 1878 in Lincoln (when French and five partners killed Brady and a deputy), he and Billy the Kid broke from cover and ran to Brady's body, ostensibly to get his arrest warrant for Alexander McSween. A deputy who survived the shooting, Billy Matthews, opened fire. His shot wounded both men, French so seriously he that couldn't travel, hiding out under a friend's floor for a day until the Regulators smuggled him out of town. Just three days later, Jim French was present with his pals at the Gunfight at Blazer's Mill against Buckshot Roberts, when Regulator captain Richard M. Brewer was killed.

When the Regulators were trapped in Lincoln in July 1878, French was trapped along with McSween and Billy the Kid in the burning McSween house. Throughout the five-day ordeal, French remained volatile and dangerous. During a shouted parlay, when those surrounding them demanded to see the deputized Regulators' arrest warrants for rival James Dolan, French yelled back, "Our warrants are in our guns, you cock-sucking sonsabitches!" When the house was set afire on July 19, French and Billy the Kid led the Regulators out the rear door and escaped while several of their companions, including McSween, were gunned down in the backyard.

By the fall of 1878, the war had ended and the Regulators split up. French left New Mexico, later writing a friend from a new home near Keota, Oklahoma.

== Postwar ==
French was rumored to have been killed back in Lincoln County, New Mexico, in a quarrel over stolen cattle on June 21, 1879, but this seems unlikely. Others say he went to South America. A man named Jim French was killed on February 6, 1895 while trying to rob a store in Catoosa, Oklahoma, but there is nothing to indicate that this man was the Jim French of the Lincoln County War. Fellow Regulator George Coe stated in 1927 that French had been shot in Oklahoma "about three years ago." Jim French's fate remains just as much a mystery as his origins.

== See also ==
- List of fugitives from justice who disappeared

== In popular culture ==
In the film Young Guns II, Jim French was combined with fellow Regulator Henry Brown, and presented as a composite named Hendry French. Timid and clumsy, the film's portrayal of French, by actor Alan Ruck bears little actual resemblance to either outlaw.

== Bibliography ==
- Billy the Kid: A Short and Violent Life, by Robert M. Utley, University of Nebraska Press, 1989.
- The Lincoln County War, A Documentary History, by Frederick Nolan, University of Oklahoma Press, Norman, 1992.
