= Charlie Bowdre =

American cowboy and outlaw (1848–1880)

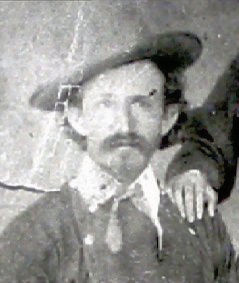
- Charlie Bowdre
- Born: Charles Meriwether Bowdre c. 1848; Wilkes County, Georgia
- Died: December 23, 1880 (aged 31–32); Stinking Springs, New Mexico
- Cause of death: Gunshot wounds
- Resting place: Old Fort Sumner Cemetery; 34°24′13″N 104°11′37″W
- Occupations: Ranch hand, gunfighter, outlaw
- Parents: Father: Albert Rees Bowdre; Mother: Lucy Clark Oliver Meriwether

Charles Bowdre (c. 1848 – December 23, 1880) was an American cowboy and outlaw. He was an associate of Billy the Kid and member of his gang.

== Early life ==
Bowdre was born in Wilkes County, Georgia in 1848, the firstborn child of Albert and Lucy Bowdre. When he was three years old, he and his parents moved to DeSoto County, Mississippi, where they had six more children (Eppie in 1854, Sallie in 1855, Volney and Benjamin in 1857, William in 1863 and Lucy Lee in 1863). By 1854, young Charlie started working on his father's farm, and as he grew up became an adept farmer. Much of what Bowdre did between the year in which his last sister was born (1863) and 1874 remains a mystery.

It is believed, however, that he abandoned the family's farm to become a wanderer. He left home sometime around 1870, and records show that by 1874, he had arrived at Lincoln County, New Mexico. Bowdre became friends with Doc Scurlock during this time, and the two men opened a cheese factory on the Gila River. He also joined Scurlock on several posses during this period, pursuing cattle thieves and rustlers, and on several occasions took part in the lynching of those captured. On July 18, 1876, Bowdre, Scurlock, Frank Coe, George Coe, and Ab Saunders stormed the Lincoln jail, freeing cattle rustler Jesus Largo from the custody of Sheriff Saturnino Baca, taking Largo outside of town and hanging him. No charges were ever filed for the event. On August 5, 1877, he and a companion were arrested for "shooting up" the town of Lincoln while intoxicated.

== Lincoln County War ==
With the outbreak of the Lincoln County War in 1878, Bowdre sided with the Tunstall-McSween side, and he met Billy the Kid, Jose Chavez y Chavez and the rest of the Kid's associates, including Richard M. Brewer, Jim French, George Coe and Frank Coe. During the conflict, he was known to have been present with his fellow Regulators when William Morton, Frank Baker, and William McCloskey were killed along the Blackwater Creek on March 9, 1878. Bowdre was shot by Buckshot Roberts during the Gunfight of Blazer's Mills on April 4, 1878, and in turn shot Roberts. Bowdre would be charged with killing Buckshot Roberts during the Blazer's Mills Gunfight. He was also present in the July 15–19, 1878 Battle of Lincoln.

== After the Lincoln County War ==
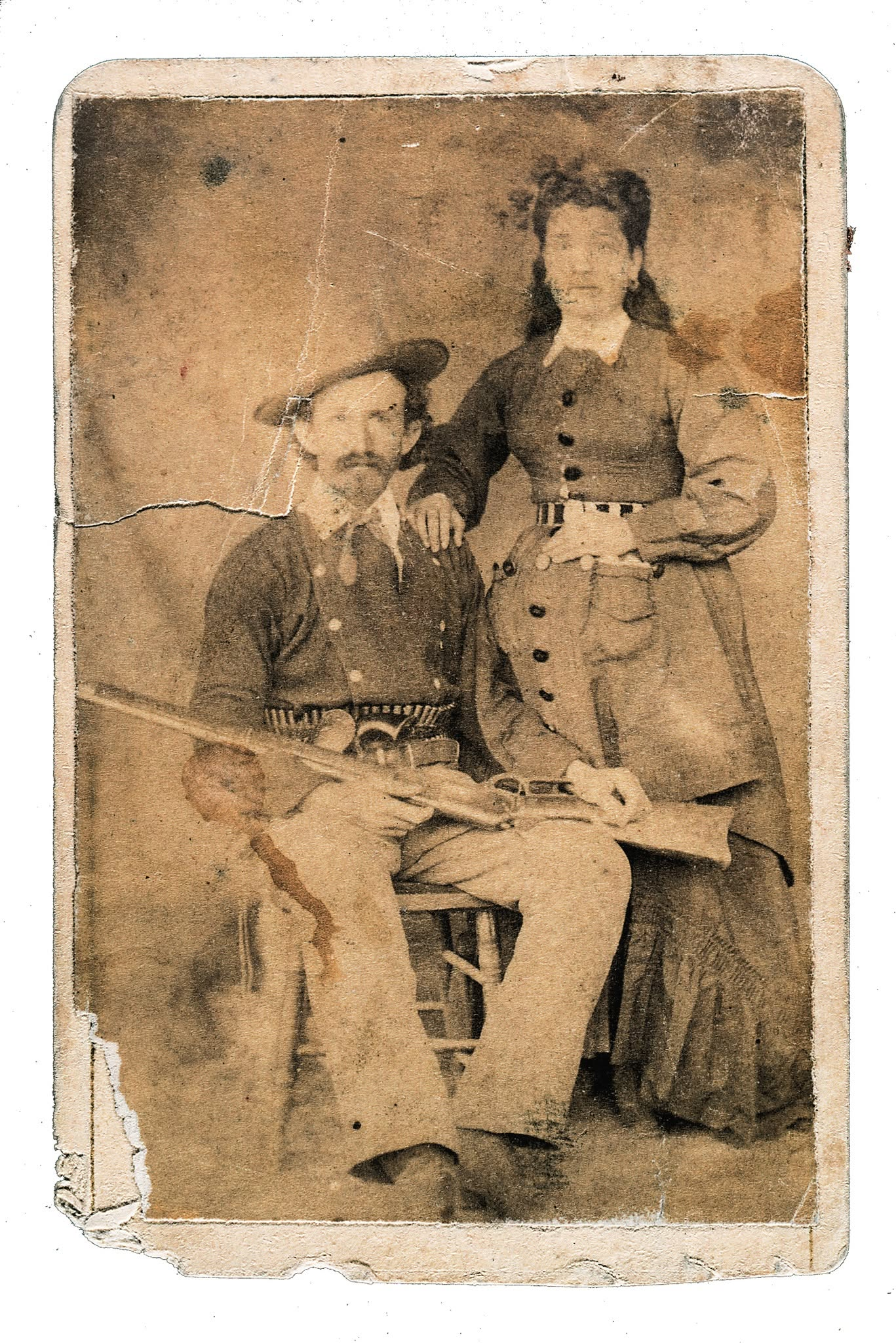
Blood stained photograph of Charlie and his wife which was taken from his body by Garrett and kept as a memento.

Bowdre worked as a cowboy on the ranches of Thomas Yerby and Pete Maxwell as the war went on, as well as being an active participant.

Bowdre married a twenty-three-year-old Mexican woman, Manuela Herrera (b. Maria Manuela Herrera in 1855), in 1878.

She was born to Jose Fernando Herrera, a friend and colleague of Bowdre, and Maria Juliana Martin. Manuela was a sister to Doc Scurlock's wife, María Antonia Miguela Herrera, known as Antonia. The fact that he was recently married when he died perhaps suggests that he would have been less likely to have been involved in the gang's activities during the few weeks that passed between his marriage and his death.

By December 1880, Charlie Bowdre was ready to quit riding with Billy the Kid and surrender for the murder of Buckshot Roberts, but he still joined the rest of the gang on a mission to ambush Pat Garrett in Fort Sumner.

A gun battle ensued, but Bowdre and most of the Kid's gang members escaped alive. On December 23, however, the gang was holed up in a rock house at Stinking Springs, New Mexico.

At dawn, Bowdre emerged to feed the horses and was shot multiple times by Garrett's posse, which had surrounded the building in the night. After being riddled with bullets he fell back into the doorway where, at the urging of Billy the Kid to "take a few of them with you when you die", Bowdre exited again, but was too weak and near death at that point and could not get his gun out of his holster. In the last seconds of his life he stumbled and fell towards Garrett repeating the phrase, "I wish...I wish..."

His remains were returned to his wife, and he was interred in the Fort Sumner graveyard next to Tom O'Folliard, another member of Billy's gang. They were joined later by Billy himself, after he was killed in July 1881.

== Portrayals ==
Charlie Bowdre was played by James Congdon in the 1958 film The Left Handed Gun, by Ron Soble in the John Wayne film Chisum, and by Charles Martin Smith in Sam Peckinpah's Pat Garrett & Billy the Kid (1973).

In the 1988 film Young Guns, he is portrayed by actor Casey Siemaszko. The circumstances of his death were the basis of a scene in Young Guns II, however, in the movie, Doc Scurlock played by Kiefer Sutherland, is the one who meets his fate outside the hut, and not Bowdre.

Actor Chris Bylsma was cast as Bowdre in the film The Kid directed by Vincent D'Onofrio.

== Bibliography ==
- Utley, Robert Marsahll (1989). Billy the Kid: A Short and Violent Life. University of Nebraska Press. p. 302. ISBN 0-8032-9558-8.
