= Doc Scurlock =

American Old West figure (1849–1929)

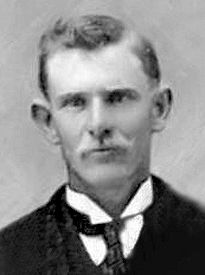
- Doc Scurlock, circa 1877
- Born: January 11, 1849; Tallapoosa County, Alabama, US
- Died: July 25, 1929 (aged 80); Eastland, Texas, US
- Resting place: Eastland City Cemetery
- Occupations: Gunman, outlaw, cowboy, vigilante
- Known for: Lincoln County Regulators

Josiah Gordon "Doc" Scurlock (January 11, 1849 – July 25, 1929) was an American Old West figure, cowboy, and gunfighter. A founding member of the Regulators during the Lincoln County War in New Mexico, Scurlock rode alongside such men as Billy the Kid.

== Early life ==
He was born in Tallapoosa County, Alabama, January 11, 1849, the sixth of 11 children born to Priestly Norman Scurlock (July 3, 1806 – June 22, 1876) and Esther Ann Brown (May 19, 1819 – June 1, 1903). Josiah was said to have studied medicine in New Orleans, thus receiving his nickname "Doc".

Described as 5 feet 8 inches (1.73 m) tall, weighing 150 pounds (68 kg), with brown eyes and dark blond hair, Doc went to Mexico in about 1870. While there, he and another man had an argument over a card game and drew their pistols. The other man shot first and the bullet went through Doc's mouth, knocking out his front teeth and coming out the back of his neck without any more serious damage. He quickly returned fire and killed the man who shot him.

== Cowboy ==
In 1871, Scurlock went to work as a line rider for John Chisum. He and other riders were also used to defend Chisum and his cattle holdings in the event cattle rustlers attempted to prey on them. Sometime during 1873, he and Jack Holt were surprised by a group of Indians, and Holt was killed. Scurlock found refuge among some rocks and, after a protracted fight, he killed the Indian leader. During the night he slipped away and walked 20 miles (32 km) for help. At some time after the fight, Holt's body was partially dismembered, as his right arm was removed at the elbow.

In September 1875, Scurlock's riding partner, Newt Higgins, was killed by Indians. Scurlock was so upset over this incident he told Chisum he wanted to quit. Chisum, however, would not hear of it and refused to pay him. Scurlock then made the newspapers when he stole three horses, two saddles, and a rifle and left for Arizona. Chisum sent some of his men after Scurlock and they caught up with him, but when he explained that he took the things because Chisum would not pay him, they agreed with him and let him go.

In Arizona, he met Charlie Bowdre and the two men opened a cheese factory on the Gila River. Some of Scurlock's and Bowdre's descendants have said that one of their first employees was Billy the Kid. After they closed the cheese factory in the spring of 1876, Scurlock and his best friend, Bowdre, returned to Lincoln County, New Mexico, where they bought a ranch on public domain land on the Rio Ruidoso from L. G. Murphy on credit, which made them victims of the L. G. Murphy & Co. monopoly.

Scurlock, Bowdre, Frank Coe, George Coe, and Ab Saunders stormed the very weak Lincoln jail on July 18, 1876, freeing cattle rustler Jesus Largo from the custody of Sheriff Saturnino Baca. They took Largo outside of town and hanged him. Scurlock accidentally shot and killed his friend, Mike G. Harkins, manager of John H. Riley's store at Blazer's Mill, while he was examining a pistol on September 2, 1876.

On October 19, 1876, Scurlock and María Antonia Miguela Herrera (June 13, 1860 – November 27, 1912) were married in Lincoln, New Mexico. (Around the same time, Antonia's sister, Manuela Herrera, married Charlie Bowdre, which made Bowdre a brother-in-law of Scurlock.) Ten children were eventually born of Scurlock and Antonia's union.

== Lincoln County War ==
For over a year, Scurlock was in several posses to pursue and arrest horse thieves. He, Bowdre, and others lynched some of the thieves they caught. In January 1877, Scurlock and a neighbor, George Coe, were arrested by Sheriff William J. Brady for suspicion of harboring a murdering fugitive and member of the Jesse Evans Gang named Frank Freeman. For the next few days, Scurlock and Coe received very harsh treatment from Brady. They were allegedly tortured, but were eventually released. In October 1877, the Evans Gang stole horses belonging to John Tunstall, Alexander McSween, and Richard "Dick" Brewer from Brewer's Rio Ruidoso ranch. Scurlock and Bowdre, as well as Brewer, went off in pursuit of the Evans Gang and located them, but were unable to regain possession of the stolen horses.

After Tunstall was murdered in February 1878, Scurlock became a founding member of the Regulators and was involved in most of the battles of the Lincoln County War. In the Gunfight of Blazer's Mills on April 4, Scurlock was shot in the leg by Buckshot Roberts. Scurlock later became the third and final leader of the Regulators, after prior leaders Dick Brewer and Frank McNab had been killed.

Scurlock served as a deputy sheriff under Sheriff John Copeland, who was a McSween partisan and replaced Sheriff Brady. On May 14, 1878, he led a posse of 18 to 20 men, which included Billy the Kid, Bowdre, George Coe, Brown, and Scroggins, to the Dolan-Riley cattle ranch, ostensibly in search of those implicated in the killing of MacNab and the wounding of Saunders. According to Riley, they drove off 26 horses and two mules, killed a herder named Wair; a Navajo Indian employed at the ranch as a cook; and a 15-year-old boy called Johnny. However, W.T. Thornton, Thomas B. Catron's law partner, reported that the latter two were only wounded. Writer Robert M. Utley says that they captured a man named "Indian" Manuel Segovia, the likely shooter of McNab, but he was shot while allegedly trying to escape.

Since Catron had foreclosed on the property of J. J. Dolan & Co., the horses appear to have been his property. As a result of his strong protest to the governor, Copeland was removed as sheriff due to his refusing to side with the Murphy-Dolan faction. The raid by the Regulators resulted in the removal of one of their partisans from a position of authority and his replacement with George Peppin, who was just as strongly attached to the other side.

When Billy attempted to make a deal with Governor Lew Wallace, Scurlock was captured and held in custody with him. He was held on suspicion of the murder of "Buckshot" Roberts. When Wallace's deal fell through, Billy and Scurlock were told they were going to be charged. Faced with extradition for murder, on June 17, 1879, Billy and Scurlock rode out of Lincoln. Sheriff Kimball did nothing to stop them. In August Billy and associates stole a large number of cattle from Chisum. After Chisum sent a posse after them, Scurlock decided to leave the gang.

== Later life ==
In about October or November 1879, Scurlock moved to Texas, where he settled down and became a highly respected citizen. On the 1880 census in Potter County, Texas, he was keeping the mail station.

Doc Scurlock died at age 80 from a heart attack in Eastland, Texas. He is interred in Eastland City Cemetery, along with his wife and other family members.

== Movie portrayals ==
In the western film, Young Guns, Scurlock was portrayed by actor Kiefer Sutherland, as a polite, moral, poetry writing cowboy. At the end of the film, Scurlock left Billy the Kid's posse, fleeing from New Mexico with an Asian woman he fell for earlier in the movie in the hopes of starting a new life in the East.

In the sequel, Young Guns II, Scurlock (again played by Sutherland) is serving as a school teacher in New York City when he is arrested and taken back to New Mexico, where he is saved from hanging by The Kid. He rejoins Billy's posse and is mortally wounded in an ambush led by John W. Poe, played by Viggo Mortensen, when he steps out of their hideout. Back inside, he staggers out again to be killed in a hail of bullets. This is based on the death of Charlie Bowdre in an ambush organized by Pat Garrett. In fact, Scurlock was married to a Mexican woman in 1876 and died peacefully in Texas many years after the period of time covered by the movie. The original "Young Guns II" screenplay accurately portrays Scurlock as heading off to Texas with his bride. It has been reported that Kiefer Sutherland, faced with scheduling conflicts, refused to return to the Young Guns franchise unless his character died in the movie's "Stinking Springs Shoot Out". Writer John Fusco fought against this demand, but ultimately rewrote the scene to accommodate Sutherland's schedule.

In the John Wayne film, Chisum, Scurlock is mentioned as one of the people Billy is recruiting in his crusade against Murphy. He appears during the climactic shootout, but it is unclear which out of half-a-dozen gang members (all played by unknown extras) is meant to be Scurlock.
