= Lincoln County Regulators =

American Old West posse in the Lincoln County War in New Mexico

The Lincoln County Regulators, or just the Regulators, were an American Old West deputized posse that fought in the Lincoln County War in New Mexico, during the late 19th century. They are well known for including Billy the Kid as a member.

== Members history and friendships ==
The Regulators were formed out of numerous small ranch owners and cowboys in the Lincoln, New Mexico area by 1876, before the Lincoln County War. Many of those who became best known as "Regulators" had a long history with one another previously. William H. Bonney, aka Billy the Kid or Henry McCarty, would become the best known, mostly because news accounts attached his name to everything the Regulators did. The Lincoln County War brought him to the front, but several of the other Regulators were actually the driving force behind the events, and had a history of killing alongside one another prior to the war.

Ab Saunders, Charlie Bowdre, Doc Scurlock, Frank Coe, and George Coe had previously killed rustlers together. On July 18, 1876, that group had stormed the Lincoln jail without opposition, removing horse thief Jesus Largo, and hanged him (no one was arrested). Saunders and Coe had tracked down cattle rustler Nicos Meras, shooting and killing him that same month in the Baca Canyon. Their association with Billy the Kid began when, in the spring of 1876, Billy (at the time known as either Henry Antrim or William Bonney) moved to Lincoln County and began working for Scurlock and Bowdre at their cheese factory. He later worked, for a time, for rancher Henry Hooker, and then for Saunders and the Coes on their ranch. By the time the Lincoln County War came along, those main core members, referred to as the "iron clad", were all more experienced and closer to being actual "gunmen" than was Billy the Kid.

== Formation and notoriety ==
The Lincoln County War began when a posse of three men, deputized by Sheriff William J. Brady, confronted and fatally shot English cattle and horse rancher John Henry Tunstall on February 18, 1878. The posse had ostensibly been chasing Tunstall to attach, i.e., seize by legal authority, some stock Tunstall and his men were driving from Tunstall's ranch on the Feliz River to Lincoln, but the posse's real motivation may have been to eliminate John Tunstall as an economic threat to businessmen James Dolan and L.G. Murphy, who allegedly had Sheriff Brady under their control.

The historian Robert Utley writes that Tunstall may have surrendered or he may just as easily have drawn his side arm and tried to defend himself from Deputies Morton, Hill, and Evans. Either way, shooting began and Tunstall died instantly when hit by two rifle bullets, one in the chest and another in the head. In the aftermath, some people "claimed that he was murdered in cold blood", while others "insisted he had been shot down while resisting arrest by a lawfully commissioned deputy sheriff of Lincoln County."

Tunstall's ranch-hands and other local citizens formed a group known as the Regulators to avenge his murder, and counter what they viewed as a corrupt territorial criminal justice system controlled by allies of Murphy, Dolan, and company. The Regulators obtained their legality from the authority of the Justice of the Peace of the town of Lincoln, John B. Wilson. Justice of the Peace Wilson issued warrants for the arrests of John Tunstall's killers, and appointed Regulator Dick Brewer a Special Constable to execute the warrants. Additionally, Regulator Robert Widenmann, who previously secured an appointment as a Deputy U.S. Marshal, was given permission to form a civilian posse and arrest the accused.

The Lincoln County War and the Regulators would launch Billy the Kid to everlasting fame. It is probable that in reality other Regulators, for example Doc Scurlock, were closer to actually being "gunmen" than Billy. It is likely that in some cases, Billy the Kid was credited with killings that in fact were carried out by other Regulators. By the Regulators' end, any killings committed by them had his name appended, whether he was the actual shooter or not. This would eventually be detrimental to his attempts at amnesty.

The Regulators would go through three different leaders, all but one being killed. Although Billy the Kid would achieve fame as a member of the Regulators, he never led them. Their first leader was Richard "Dick" Brewer, killed later by Buckshot Roberts and replaced by Frank McNab, who was killed by members of the Seven Rivers Warriors. McNab was replaced by the Regulators final leader, Doc Scurlock.

William Bonney, aka Billy the Kid, never made any effort to become well known, or to be the main subject of news reports on the events taking place during the range war. Frank Coe commented years later, "He never pushed in his advice or opinions, but he had a wonderful presence of mind."

== Known members ==
- Billy the Kid
- Charlie Bowdre
- Richard M. Brewer – the first leader
- Henry Newton Brown
- Roscoe Rustling Bob Bryant
- Jose Chavez y Chavez
- Frank Coe
- George Coe
- Jim French
- William McCloskey – traitor against the group according to the Kid and McNab.
- Frank McNab – second leader
- John Middleton
- Tom O'Folliard
- Ignacio Gonzales
- Tom Peterson
- Vicente Romero
- Yginio Salazar
- Ab Saunders
- John Scroggins – present at the Blazer's Mills gunfight
- Doc Scurlock – third and final leader
- "Tiger Sam" Smith – present at the Blackwater shootings, later killed by Natives.
- Matt "Steiny" Steinmueller
- "Dirty Steve" Stephens – present at the Blazer's Mills gunfight
- Fred Waite
- Robert Widenmann (Bob) – present at the murders of John Tunstall and Sheriff Brady
- Francisco Zamora
- Heika "Heik" Anena

== Timeline ==
- February 18, 1878, Tunstall was killed by Murphy-Dolan gunmen William Morton, Frank Baker, Jesse Evans and Tom Hill while he and his ranch-hands, Dick Brewer, Billy the Kid, John Middleton, Henry Newton Brown, Bob Widenmann, and Fred Waite, were driving nine horses from his ranch on the Rio Feliz to Lincoln. The next day, Bonney and Brewer swear out affidavits and warrants are issued by Justice of the Peace John Wilson for the sub-posse. While trying to serve the warrants, Waite, Bonney and Constable Martinez are detained by Sheriff William J. Brady. Waite and Bonney miss Tunstall's funeral, Martinez would be let go. On the 23rd Bonney and Waite are let out of jail.
- March 1, "Dick" Brewer is appointed town constable by Justice of the Peace John Wilson, Billy is his deputy. They are to bring in Tunstall's murderers. Others are deputized and call themselves "The Regulators".
- March 6, The Regulators arrest Bill Morton and Frank Baker. Three days later Morton, Baker and Regulator William McCloskey are killed at Agua Negra, with McCloskey believed to have betrayed the Regulators.
- March 9, Territorial Governor Samuel B. Axtell decreed that John Wilson, the Justice of the Peace, had been illegally appointed by the Lincoln County Commissioners. Wilson had deputized the Regulators and issued the warrants for Tunstall's murderers. Axtell's decree meant that the Regulators' actions, formerly considered legal, were now beyond the law. Axtell also was able to revoke Widenmann's status as a deputy U. S. marshal, making Sheriff Brady and his men the only law officers of Lincoln County.
- April 1, Jim French, Frank MacNab, John Middleton, Fred Waite, Henry Brown, Billy the Kid, and possibly Bob Widenmann shoot at the Sheriff and his deputies through makeshift portals of the adobe wall they were behind. Bonney is wounded by Matthews while attempting to recover the rifle taken from him by Brady. Sheriff Brady and Deputy Hindman are killed.
- April 4, There is a gun battle at Blazer's Mill with Buckshot Roberts. Buckshot and Brewer are killed, Middleton is badly wounded, Bonney is grazed by a bullet, George Coe has his trigger finger shot off.
- April 18, The Kid, Middleton, Waite and Brown are indicted for the murder of Sheriff Brady. Dolan, Evans, Matthews and others are indicted for the murder of Tunstall.
- April 29, Frank McNab is killed by members of the Seven Rivers Warriors. Ab Saunders is badly wounded, and Frank Coe captured.
- April 30, George Coe shoots and wounds Seven Rivers member "Dutch Charlie" Kruling in Lincoln. Seven Rivers members Tom Green, Charles Marshall, Jim Patterson and John Galvin are killed that same day, and although the Regulators are blamed, their involvement was never proven. Seven Rivers gang members at that time were beginning to turn on one another.
- May 15, The Regulators gained some revenge by storming the area around Seven Rivers, capturing and killing Manuel Segovia, the cowboy who had killed Frank McNab.
- July 15, the Regulators were surrounded in Lincoln at the McSween house. Facing them were the Dolan/Murphy/Seven Rivers cowboys.
- July 19, the house was set afire. As the flames spread and night fell, Susan McSween was granted safe passage out of the house while the men inside continued to fight the fire. By 9 o'clock, those left inside got set to break out the back door of the burning house. Jim French went out first, followed by Billy the Kid, Tom O'Folliard, and Jose Chavez y Chavez. The Dolan men saw the running men and opened fire, killing Harvey Morris, Alexander McSween's law partner. Some troopers moved into the back yard to take those left into custody when a close-order gunfight erupted. Alex McSween was killed, as was Seven Rivers cowboy Bob Beckwith. With McSween dead the war was over.

== Aftermath ==
Ultimately, the Lincoln County War accomplished little other than to foment distrust and animosity in the area and to make fugitives out of the surviving Regulators, most notably Billy the Kid. The Kid, Scurlock, Bowdre, Chavez y Chavez, Waite, Saunders, Brewer, Brown, McNab and the Coe cousins received the most notoriety as being "Regulators". Gradually, his fellow gunmen scattered to their various fates, and Billy the Kid was left with Charlie Bowdre, Tom O'Folliard, Dirty Dave Rudabaugh, and a few other friends with whom he rustled cattle and committed other petty crimes while negotiating for an amnesty that would never come, and evading capture.

== Post-war careers ==
- Ab Saunders died in 1884, in San Francisco, California, during surgery to correct problems he still suffered due to his wound received on April 29, 1878.
- Fred Waite headed back to what is now present-day Oklahoma where, as a member of the Chickasaw Nation, he settled down as a rancher, and ultimately went into politics.
- Frank and George Coe moved around for a time, eventually returning to Lincoln, where they became highly respected citizens, and successful ranchers.
- Jose Chavez y Chavez eventually became a police officer, but became involved in a murder for hire, for which he spent time in prison. After his release he lived a seemingly quiet life until dying in 1924.
- Robert A. Widenmann's post-New Mexico career took him to Great Britain, where he visited Tunstall's family, and to Haverstraw, N.Y. where he died on April 13, 1930, at the age of 78.
- Doc Scurlock moved to Texas, where he became a respected citizen in both Potter County, Texas, and Eastland County, Texas, dying at the age of 80.

Most of the some 40 plus Regulators were relative unknowns and their whereabouts after the war ended up being lost to history.

== Popular culture ==
- The Regulators were featured in the movie Young Guns, which only featured seven members.
- Two groups of gun-slinging self-appointed lawmen known as the "Regulators", one a band of tyrannical raiders based in the West Coast and one a loose association of DC bounty-hunters, can also be found in the computer game series Fallout.
- The Lincoln County Regulators are a popular bluegrass/folk band based in Scotland.
- Popular 1990s hip-hop artists Warren G and Nate Dogg penned the song "Regulate", the fictionalized telling of a lurid evening set in the inner city loosely based on the similarly scandalous escapades of members of the American Old West Regulators.

== See also ==
- John Chisum
- Lew Wallace
