= John Middleton (cowboy) =

American cowboy (1854–1885)

John Middleton (1854–1885) was a friend of Billy the Kid and a key member of the Lincoln County Regulators, who fought on behalf of John Tunstall during the Lincoln County War.

== Background ==
Born around 1854, Middleton came to Lincoln County in the New Mexico Territory from Texas in the mid-1870s and went to work for John Tunstall. Described as a heavyset, swarthy man with black hair and eyes and a large handlebar mustache, Middleton was known as a first-rate cowboy as well an excellent fistfighter and pistol marksman.

Middleton was close enough to John Tunstall to hear his last words just before he was shot down by Dolan gunmen William Morton, Jesse Evans and Tom Hill on February 18, 1878. After this, Middleton participated in most major Lincoln County Regulators operations of the Lincoln County War. That included the murder of Sheriff William Brady on April 1, 1878.

Three days later, Middleton was seriously wounded in the chest during the gunfight with Buckshot Roberts at the Gunfight at Blazer's Mill. Amazingly, he survived his wound and resumed his place with the Regulators once he recovered. By autumn of 1878, the war was over and Middleton and the last of the Regulators split up.

John Middleton's ultimate fate is unclear; some say he remained in the area, dying of smallpox on November 18, 1882, in San Lorenzo, New Mexico. Other accounts say he moved to Kansas, where he married and worked as a cowboy, dying in 1885, either by drowning in a stream or from the effects of his chest wound sustained years earlier at Blazer's Mill.
