= Jesse Evans Gang =

1876–80 gang in New Mexico, United States

- Years active: 1876-1880
- Territory: New Mexico
- Leader: Jesse Evans
- Activities: Cattle rustling, robbery
- Notable members: Pony Diehl; Curly Bill Brocius

The Jesse Evans Gang, also known as The Boys, was a gang of rustlers and robbers led by outlaw and gunman Jesse Evans, which lasted from 1876 until 1880. The gang was formed after Evans broke with the John Kinney Gang. After breaking away, he brought along with him Billy Morton, Frank Baker, Tom Hill, Dolly Graham, George Davis, Jim McDaniels, Buffalo Bill Spawn, Bob Martin, Manuel "Indian" Segovia and Nicholas Provencio.

== History ==
=== Early history ===
The gang initiated numerous acts of robbery and cattle rustling from 1876 through 1880, most committed in New Mexico. Sometime in the spring of 1876 Evans and other gang members killed Pancho Cruz, Roman Mes and Tomas Cuerele at Shedd's ranch at San Augustin, Dona Ana County. They then shifted their domain to Lincoln County, New Mexico. They raided John Chisum's ranch, whom Evans had once worked for, and the Mescalero Apache reservation. Sometime around the 1877 mark it is believed that Billy the Kid rode with them.

=== Lincoln County War ===
The gang was hired in late 1877 by the "Murphy-Dolan Faction", to harass the latter's opposition in Lincoln County, New Mexico. They began by rustling the cattle and horses of the Tunstall-McSween Faction. In February 1878, a posse was dispatched by Sheriff Brady to arrest rancher John Tunstall. That posse included Jesse Evans, William Morton, Frank Baker, Tom Hill and Dolly Graham, all members of Evans' gang. They ambushed and murdered Tunstall on February 18, 1878, which ignited the Lincoln County War. Several days later, on March 9, 1878, the Lincoln County Regulators, a vigilante posse formed by Tunstall and McSween supporters and at the time led by Dick Brewer caught Morton and Baker, and executed both men. On that same day Jesse Evans was injured and Tom Hill was killed while attempting to raid a ranch near Tularosa. Evans was arrested but managed to break out of jail. Evans returned and was present at the five-day siege at McSween's house, known as the Battle of Lincoln.

=== After the Lincoln County War ===
After the war Evans and Billy Mathews are said to have attempted to make peace with Billy the Kid, but the two killed lawyer Huston Chapman, putting them on the run from law enforcement. The gang fled down to Texas, but Texas Rangers began pursuing them relentlessly, and killed several gang members including Dolly Graham. The Rangers caught up with the gang, including Evans, in Presidio del Norte, Mexico, on July 3, 1880. The gunfight that followed would mark the end of the Jesse Evans Gang.

The Rangers engaged them in a shootout, during which Evans shot and killed Ranger George Bingham, and Ranger D.T. Carson was wounded by other gang members. In turn, Ranger Carson and Ranger Ed Sieker shot and killed gang member George Davis, and shot and wounded gang member John Gross. The remaining members were captured. Gross was sentenced to a long prison term, but spent less than four years. Evans was sentenced to ten years.

But in 1882 the outlaw walked out of prison a free man, and decided jail was not for him. His debt paid to society he was never heard from again. In 1948, however, almost seventy years after he disappeared, Jesse's brother died and his estate needed to be settled. It was then that a man claiming to be Jesse Evans appeared and revealed that he had been living in Florida under the alias Joe Hines. Joe Hines was able to prove to the satisfaction of a court of law that he was the one and only Jesse Evans of legend.

== Known members ==
This is a list of all the known members of the Jesse Evans gang:

- Jesse Evans, disappeared after being released from prison. A man claiming to be Evans appeared in 1948, to claim a parcel of land left to him by his younger brother, he had been living in Florida under the alias Joe Hines.
- William Morton, killed by the Regulators on March 9, 1878, Agua Negra Canyon, New Mexico.
- Frank Baker, killed by the Regulators on March 9, 1878, Agua Negra Canyon, New Mexico.
- Tom Hill, killed by a sheep herder on March 9, 1878, near Tularosa, New Mexico.
- George Davis, killed by Texas Rangers on July 3, 1880, Chinati Mountains, Texas.
- Manuel "Indian" Segovia, killed by the Regulators on May 19, 1878, Seven Rivers, New Mexico.
- Jimmy McDaniels, died of old age around 1950.
- Dick Lloyd, killed in Arizona in early 1880s.
- Charles "Pony" Diehl, went to Tombstone, Arizona and played a prominent role during the Clanton-Earp feud.
- Jack Long, went to Arizona and disappeared.
- George "Buffalo Bill" Spawn, nothing known of life after Lincoln County War.
- Nicholas Provencio, nothing known of life after Lincoln County War.
- Bob Martin, convicted of armed robbery in El Paso, Texas in 1878, and migrated to Cochise County, Arizona.
- William "Curly Bill" Brocius, aka William Bresnaham, convicted of armed robbery in El Paso, Texas in 1878, and migrated to Cochise County, Arizona.
- Roscoe Burrell, nothing known of life after Lincoln County War.
- Serafin Aragon, nothing known of life after Lincoln County War.
- Ponciano Domingues, nothing known of life after Lincoln County War.
- Billy Campbell, nothing known of life after Lincoln County War.
- John Selman
