= Jesse Evans =

19th-century American criminal

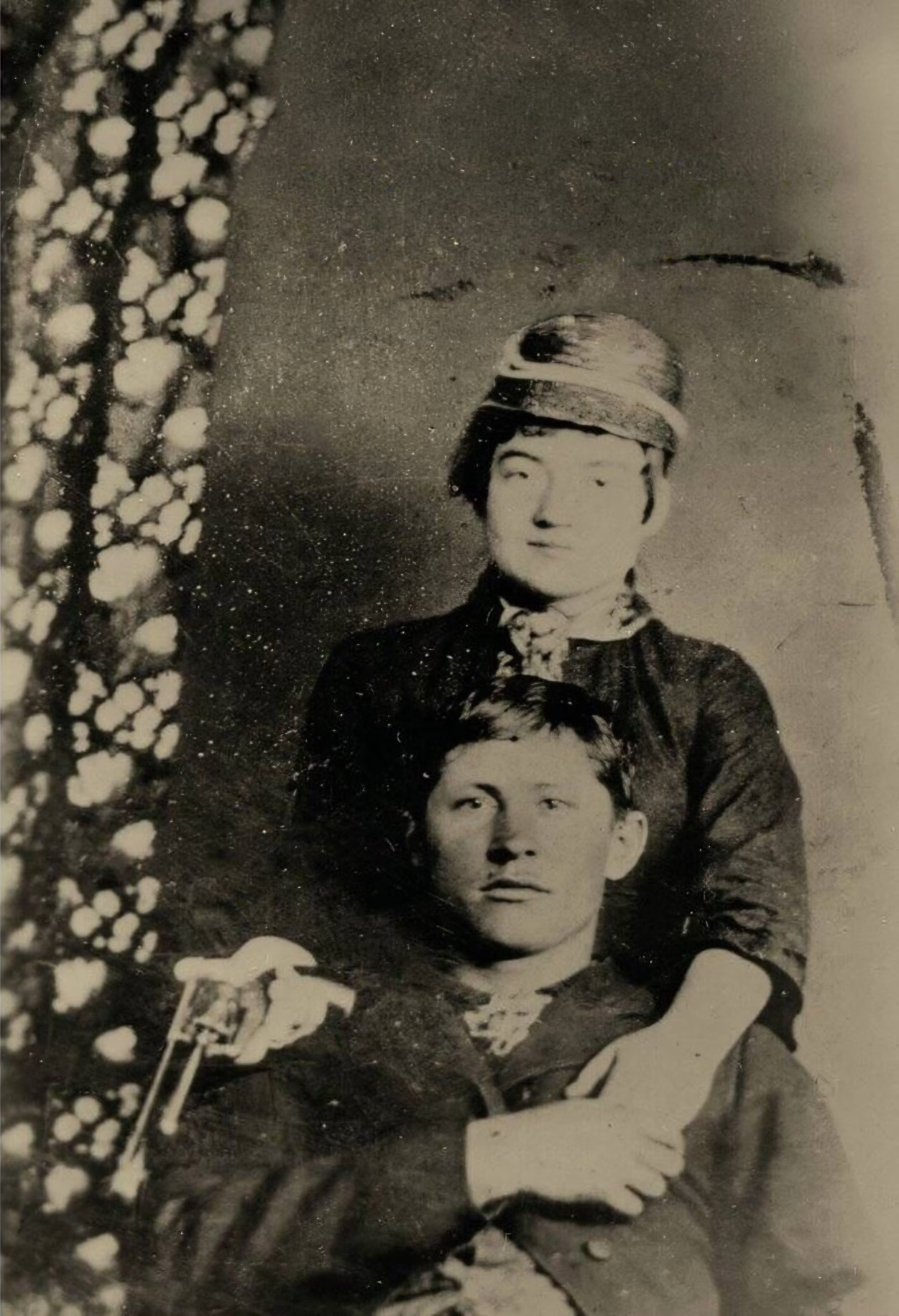
- Jesse Evans and a woman, around 1876
- Born: c. 1853; Missouri or Texas, U.S.
- Disappeared: 1882 (aged 28–29); Huntsville, Texas, U.S.
- Occupations: Outlaw, gunman

Jesse Evans (c. 1853 — disappeared 1882) was an American outlaw and gunman of the Old West, and the leader of the Jesse Evans Gang. He received some attention due to his disappearance in 1882, after which he was never seen or heard from again. Commentators speculated that Evans was living in Florida under the name Joe Hines in 1948, though no definitive proof was ever provided; and, he is presumed dead.

== Early outlaw life ==
Jesse J. Evans is believed to have been born around 1853 in Missouri, although some historians believe he was born in Texas. He was a graduate of Washington and Lee College in Virginia. He was arrested with both his parents on June 26, 1871, in Elk City, Kansas, for passing counterfeit money. He was released shortly thereafter, and by 1872 he was in the New Mexico Territory.

Evans began working as a cowboy and was employed by several ranches, including that of John Chisum. After ending his employment with Chisum, Evans ventured to both Las Cruces and La Mesilla, New Mexico, where he became associated with John Kinney. At the time, Kinney was leading one of the more well-known gangs in the New Mexico Territory, called the John Kinney Gang. Evans joined the gang, and over time he and Kinney became close.

On the night of December 31, 1875, Kinney, Evans, Pony Diehl, and Jim McDaniels went into Las Cruces. While there the gang members became involved in a disagreement and later a brawl with soldiers of the U.S. Cavalry stationed at Fort Seldon. The outlaws lost the fight and left, only to return and open fire on the saloon which resulted in several persons killed and wounded.

== Forming of his own gang ==
Kinney had been badly wounded in the earlier fight, and needed to heal. A short time after that night, while Kinney was still healing, Evans and gang member Samual Blanton shot and killed Quirino Fletcher in Las Cruces, for reasons still not known. There was also alleged to have been a third shooter present, a man named Morris, but that is unconfirmed.

Evans stood trial for the murder, but was acquitted. It was around this time that Evans broke away from the Kinney Gang to form his own gang. Several of the Kinney Gang members joined him in the new gang, including Billy Morton, Frank Baker, Jim McDaniels, Buffalo Bill Spawn, Dolly Graham, Tom Hill, Bob Martin, Nicholas Provencio, and Manuel Segovia. Although usually referred as the "Jesse Evans Gang", they referred to themselves as "The Boys". They were involved in numerous acts of robbery and cattle rustling between 1875 and 1880.

== Lincoln County War and after ==
In late 1877 the gang was hired by the "Murphy-Dolan faction" prior to and eventually during the Lincoln County War, to face off against Billy the Kid and his faction. Despite the fame that Billy the Kid would eventually receive due to the war, by many accounts Evans was the most feared of the two factions. Evans and members of his gang harassed rancher John Tunstall, and on February 18, 1878, Evans, Frank Baker, William Morton, and Tom Hill murdered Tunstall, which ignited the Lincoln County War.

Evans would figure prominently into the range war, often taking the lead on operations against the Lincoln County Regulators. His role is often downplayed, but in most documented accounts, Evans was at the front. In later letters written by Billy the Kid to Governor Lew Wallace, Evans was mentioned, and Billy Bonney even stated in one that he feared being assassinated by Evans. On March 6, 1878 William Morton and Frank Baker were tracked down by the Regulators and killed for the Tunstall murder, and on that same day Evans and Tom Hill were rustling sheep during which Hill was killed and Evans was wounded by the sheep farmer. On April 29, 1878, Evans led a posse that killed Regulator Frank McNab and badly wounded Regulator Ab Saunders.

On April 30, 1878, Seven Rivers Warriors members Tom Green, Charles Marshall, Jim Patterson and John Galvin were killed in Lincoln, and although the Regulators were blamed, that was never proven, and there were feuds going inside the Seven Rivers Warriors at that time. The Regulators reacted by tracking down Manuel Segovia, the Seven Rivers gang member believed responsible for the death of McNab, killing him. Starting on July 15, 1878, Evans and his gang were a main factor in the Battle of Lincoln, which ended in a draw with three dead on the Regulators side, and three dead on the Murphy-Dolan side, along with several wounded.

After the Lincoln War ended, Evans and gang member Billy Campbell on February 18, 1879, killed an attorney named Huston Chapman, who was the lawyer hired by Susan McSween on behalf of her husband Alexander McSween, who was killed during the Battle of Lincoln, and the gang was again on the run from lawmen. Texas Rangers caught up to them near Presidio del Norte, in Mexico. In the ensuing gunbattle, Evans shot and killed Ranger George Bingham, while gang member John Gross was wounded by the Rangers, and gang member George Davis was shot and killed by Rangers D.T. Carson and Ed Sieker. Ranger Carson was also shot and wounded. The gang had already lost several other members, killed prior to Presidio while Rangers were pursuing them, to include Dolly Graham. Evans was arrested, tried and sentenced to prison. However, he escaped while on work detail one day, but was recaptured a few months later. Sent to Huntsville Prison, he was released in 1882 and was never seen or heard from again. Where he went and what happened to him is a mystery.

== Joe Hines ==
In 1948, a probate investigator from St. Louis, Missouri, William V. Morrison, located an elderly man called Joe Hines in Florida, who had claimed the lands of his deceased brother.

During Morrison's interview, Hines said that of those involved in the Lincoln County War in New Mexico, three, including himself, remained alive, and that the other two were Jim McDaniels (an Evans Gang member) and Billy the Kid.

Hines told Morrison of his experiences in the range war and surprised him by claiming that Billy the Kid was still alive, but refused to reveal the name he had assumed or exactly where he was living. Some commentators have suggested that Hines was actually Evans, living under an assumed name.

Morrison privately continued his search for the man who claimed to be Billy the Kid, and in 1948 an elderly man named Frank J. Dalton in Lawton, Oklahoma claimed to be Jesse James, and said Billy the Kid was still alive in Hamilton Texas, where he was known as O. L. Roberts.

With some coaxing, Roberts did talk to Morrison, who found his story convincing enough to write a book detailing Roberts' exploits as Billy the Kid, but eventually his story was discredited by almost all historians. Hines won his case, and was granted his brother's land in North Dakota, although it was never shown that Hines had been Evans.

Morrison also attempted to track down former Evans Gang member Jim McDaniels, locating him in Round Rock, Texas. McDaniels, along with Severo Gallegos, Martile Able, Jose Montoya, and Bill and Sam Jones, all of whom had known Billy the Kid, signed affidavits claiming to verify that Roberts was, in fact, Billy the Kid.

== In popular culture and media ==
In the 1970 movie Chisum, Evans is portrayed by Richard Jaeckel. The character is aligned with the Murphy/Dolan faction and is shot dead by Billy the Kid when trying to escape in the aftermath of the Battle of Lincoln.

Evans appears in three western novels written by William W. Johnstone, although his three appearances present radical continuity problems for Johnstone's shared western universe. In The Last Gunfighter: Vengeance of the Mountain Man, he is among a group of outlaws who the villain tries to hire to kill the gunfighter Smoke Jensen. Evans refuses and leaves, and it's mentioned that he boasts of having backed down Billy the Kid, but that many people have been making this claim since Billy's death. Two books later, The Last Gunfighter: Battle of the Mountain Man features Evans in a more antagonistic role. Battle of the Mountain Man takes place during the Lincoln County War even though it references the events of Vengeance of the Mountain Man, which takes place long after the war. In Battle of the Mountain Man, Evans is a ruthless and arrogant figure who, around the time of Tunstall's death, leads a gang of rustlers who attack Jensen while he is delivering beef to John Chisum. Evans constantly underestimates Jensen even as the gunfighter kills his best men and only survives due to never personally facing Jensen. Evans is also a major antagonist in Rage of Eagles, the fifth book a series which crosses over with The Last Mountain Man series on occasion. Rage of Eagles ignores the events of Battle of the Mountain Man and features Evans in a mainly historically accurate role, only for him and his gang to be ambushed and wiped out by the protagonist and several of Billy the Kid's regulators a few days after Pat Garrett claims the bounty on Billy.
