= Richard M. Brewer =

American outlaw and gunman (1850–1878)

Dick Brewer
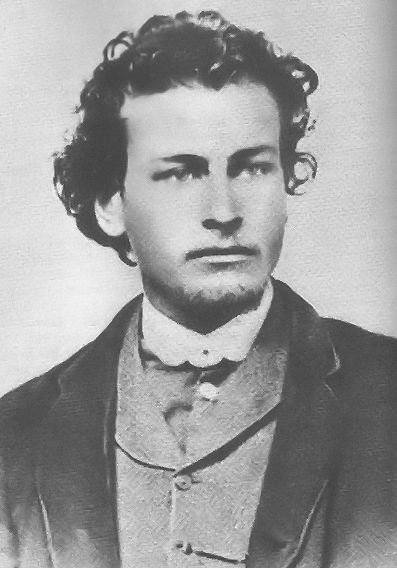
- Brewer, circa 1875
- Born: Richard Brewer; February 19, 1850; St. Albans, Vermont, U.S.
- Died: April 4, 1878 (aged 28); Blazer's Mills, New Mexico Territory
- Cause of death: Gunshot wound
- Resting place: Blazer Cemetery, Mescalero, Otero County, New Mexico
- Occupations: Cowboy, lawman
- Parents: Father: Rensselaer Brewer; Mother: Phebe Honsinger

Richard M. Brewer (February 19, 1850 – April 4, 1878), was an American cowboy and Lincoln County lawman. He was the founding leader of the Regulators, a deputized posse that fought in the Lincoln County War.

== Early life ==
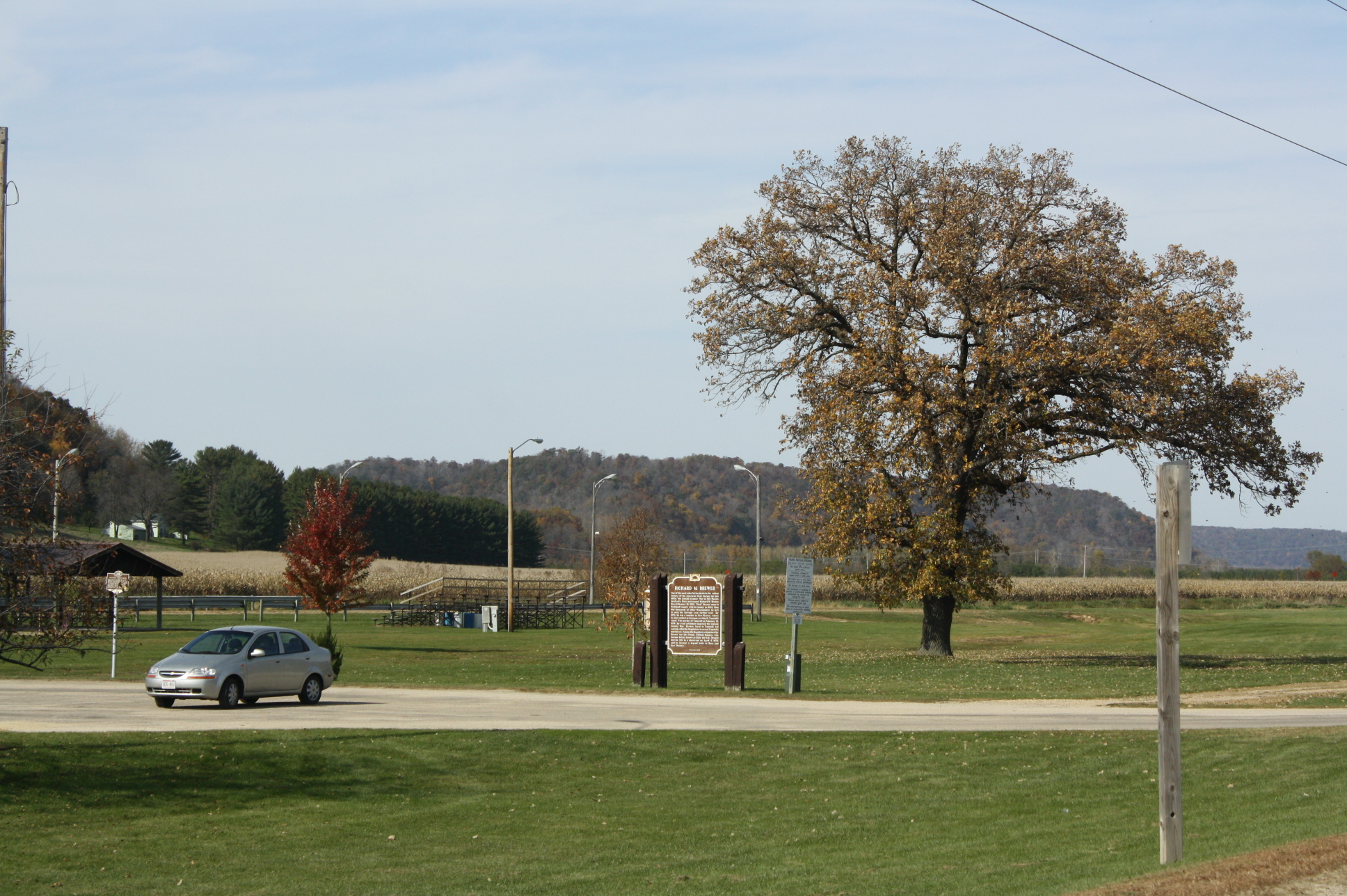
Commemorative sign for Brewer at Boaz Community Park

Brewer was born on February 19, 1850, in St. Albans, Vermont. At the age of four, he and his family moved to Boaz, Wisconsin. He moved on to Missouri before arriving in Lincoln County, New Mexico Territory. He tried farming as a profession, and bought a farm in Lincoln County with this in mind. In the spring of 1871, he began working for Lawrence Murphy, but soon left that job for unknown reasons. By 1876, he was working as a cattle foreman for cattleman John Tunstall, owner of one of the largest farms in the area.

== The Lincoln County War ==
On February 18, 1878, Tunstall was murdered. After the murder, a posse was deputized to serve arrest warrants on his killers, with Brewer chosen to lead the posse. The Regulators originated from that posse, which included Billy the Kid and Jose Chavez y Chavez.

Brewer established a bond of friendship with Billy the Kid, Jose Chavez y Chavez and the rest of Billy the Kid's gang, and he was often accompanied by gang members. Being one of the founders of the Regulators, Brewer sometimes assumed a leadership role when around Billy, Chavez and the rest of their company. He was the first leader of the Regulators during the early stages of the Lincoln County War. He was known to be the most mature of the group by all accounts, and the rest of the Regulators accepted him in that role.

The confirmed killings claimed to have been carried out by the Regulators during Brewer's period as leader were those of Lincoln County Sheriff William Brady, William Morton, Deputy Sheriff George W. Hindman, lawman/outlaw Frank Baker, Buckshot Roberts, and fellow Regulator William McCloskey, whom the Regulators believed to have betrayed them. Brewer did not agree with the killing of Sheriff Brady and Deputy Hindman, but supported and participated in the other murders.

Although most of those killed by the Regulators throughout their existence were publicly credited to Billy the Kid, most historians agree that there are doubts as to whether he was the actual killer in most cases, and agree that often their victims were killed during a shootout, with many members of the Regulators firing at the same time. It was, however, Billy the Kid who became known, and through whose notoriety, the fame of the Regulators spread.

== Death ==
Brewer was killed by an old American Bison hunter by the name of "Buckshot Roberts", during the Gunfight of Blazer's Mills, on April 4, 1878. Five other Regulators were wounded during this battle. Buckshot Roberts was also shot and killed during the gunfight, either by a shot fired by George Coe, whose finger was shot off by Roberts, or Charlie Bowdre.

== Portrayal in popular culture ==
- In the 1988 movie, Young Guns, Brewer was played by Charlie Sheen.
- In the 2015 Television Movie "Billy the Kid: New Evidence", Brewer was played by Gerard "Jard" Griesbaum.
