= Call of Juarez: Gunslinger =

2013 first-person shooter video game

- Developer: Techland
- Publishers: Ubisoft (2013-2018); Techland (2018-)
- Producers: Paweł Zawodny; Krzysztof Nosek
- Designers: Paweł Marchewka; Tomasz Klin
- Programmers: Sebastian Chain; Sebastian Kowal; Radosław Malicki; Paweł Nowak
- Artists: Paweł Selinger; Kamil Braun
- Writers: Rafał W. Orkan; Haris Orkin
- Composers: Paweł Błaszczak; Rod Abernethy
- Series: Call of Juarez
- Engine: Chrome Engine 5
- Platforms: PlayStation 3; Windows; Xbox 360; Nintendo Switch
- Release: PS3, Windows, Xbox 360: WW: May 22, 2013; Nintendo Switch: WW: December 10, 2019
- Genre: First-person shooter
- Mode: Single-player

Call of Juarez: Gunslinger is a 2013 Western-themed first-person shooter for PlayStation 3, Windows, Xbox 360, and Nintendo Switch. Developed by Techland and originally published by Ubisoft, it was released in May 2013 for PlayStation 3, Windows and Xbox 360. The Switch port was released in December 2019. It is the fourth game in the Call of Juarez series, although narratively, it is unrelated to the three previous titles (Call of Juarez, Call of Juarez: Bound in Blood, and Call of Juarez: The Cartel).

The game tells the story of Silas Greaves, a bounty hunter in the American West during the second half of the 19th century. Telling his story to a group of saloon patrons in 1910, Silas's increasingly grandiose and difficult-to-believe tales find him hunting Roscoe "Rustling Bob" Bryant, as he either teams up with or squares off against Wild West legends such as Billy the Kid, Pat Garrett, Newman Haynes Clanton, Johnny Ringo, Curly Bill Brocius, Henry Plummer, John Wesley Hardin, a Chiricahua war party, the Dalton Gang, George Curry, Kid Curry, Butch Cassidy, the Sundance Kid, Jesse James, and Frank James.

After The Cartel changed the series' setting from the Wild West to the modern-day, Gunslinger returned the series to a western setting. In making the game, the designers were very much trying to redeem the reputation of the Call of Juarez brand after the critically reviled and commercially unsuccessful The Cartel. In returning to the Wild West setting of the first two games in the series, the designers decided to focus on the importance of storytelling in myth-making. Basing the narrative structure on Bastion, they aimed to use the game's unreliable narrator to examine the fine line between fact and fiction in establishing the legends of some of the West's best-known figures.

Gunslinger received generally positive reviews, with critics praising the storytelling, the fast-paced arcade-style shooting mechanics, the graphics, the voice acting, and the humor. Many also felt that the game was good enough to erase the memories of The Cartel. Criticisms focused on a predictable ending and shallow boss battles. The Switch port also received generally positive reviews and was praised for its fidelity to the original, although some critics took issue with the controls. The game was a commercial success, becoming Ubisoft's second best-selling digital-only title of 2013, after Far Cry 3: Blood Dragon.

== Gameplay ==
Call of Juarez: Gunslinger is a first-person shooter in which there is, unlike the previous games in the Call of Juarez series, only one player character available - the bounty hunter Silas Greaves. Each level in the game features a series of primary objectives, which must be completed sequentially as the player moves through the map. Available weaponry includes six-shooters, quickshooters, rangers, shotguns, sawed-off shotguns, rifles, sawed-off rifles, and dynamite. Unique and more powerful weaponry can also be unlocked as the player proceeds through the game.

The campaign is in the form of a story told by Silas, who is quickly established as an unreliable narrator. As his audience challenges the inconsistencies in his increasingly grandiose tales, Silas often revises the story, which can result in abrupt changes to the in-game environment. For example, there is a shootout that Silas acknowledges didn't happen, with the story literally "rewinding" in order to allow him to alter his narrative; the appearance and immediate disappearance of an Apache war party; an entire section of a level which Silas reveals to be what didn't happen; the appearance of a character without explanation, forcing Silas to go back and create some narrative context; a scene in which Silas finds himself trapped in a cave, until he mentions a way out, which then literally forms in front of the player; a portion of a level which is played through three times, with major differences between each playthrough, as a different character tells the tale each time; a level in which the weather changes several times as Silas alters what time of year it took place; the appearance and immediate disappearance of a group of Pinkertons; a level which begins with Silas on a train with no explanation as to how he got there, until someone points out this omission, with the level restarting before Silas gets on board; a level in which the narrative pauses as Silas goes to the toilet, and we hear the other characters debating the authenticity of his stories before he returns and resumes his tale.

Gameplay in Gunslinger, showing the various meters on the HUD (Concentration meter is top left, experience is bottom left, sense of death is top right.)

As with previous Call of Juarez games, "Concentration mode" is an important gameplay element; the difference here is that Gunslinger features multiple types of concentration modes. The standard mode is charged by killing enemies, with headshots charging the meter faster than body shots. Once the player activates their concentration meter, the game goes into slow motion and all enemies are automatically highlighted in red. Other forms of concentration mode include falls, door breaches, Quick Time Events (QTEs), and "Sense of Death". Falls and door breaches work the same way as normal concentration mode, except they automatically happen at certain locations irrespective of whether the player's concentration meter is charged. Falls happen when Silas is falling and there are enemies below him. Breaches happen when Silas bursts through a door.

QTEs also happen automatically. Silas will automatically target an enemy and the player is required to press a specific button to shoot and kill that enemy. If done correctly, the reticle will automatically jump to the next enemy, and so on, up to five enemies. If the player fails at any point, the game exits concentration mode and continues normally. For Sense of Death, as the player avoids game over, by having their health dip low before increasing it again, they fill their Sense of Death meter. When this meter is full, it will automatically activate when Silas is one shot away from death. When that shot is taken, the game will go into slow motion and the player will be granted the ability to dodge left or right to avoid the fatal bullet.

Every kill in the game is rewarded with experience points. A basic kill, a long shot, a headshot, and shooting a running enemy all earn 50 points, with the point total being cumulative - so, for example, a long-range headshot will earn 150 points. Other point values include killing an enemy with an exploding barrel (100), a ricochet kill (100), killing two enemies with a single shot (150), or killing an enemy with falling environmental objects (200). The player can increase their experience points haul by achieving combos; multiple kills in quick succession which increase the combo score by one for each kill (so a 150-point kill might earn 300 or 450 points, and so on). The meter will reset after a few seconds if no kills are made. These experience points allow the player to level up their skills via three skill trees; Gunslinger (focuses on handguns), Ranger (rifles), and Trapper (shotguns). After beating the game, the player can start a New Game+, carrying over their unlocked skills, which allows them to eventually fully master all three categories.

A duel in Gunslinger. Players must keep the character's hand as close to their gun as possible to increase their draw speed, whilst simultaneously keeping the target hovering over the opponent to increase their focus.

The game also features numerous duels, usually at the end of a level. In these shootouts, the game switches to third-person and the character and enemy face off against one another. There are two gauges on-screen - focus and hand speed. The player must use the dual analog sticks (or mouse and keyboard) and attempt to control both gauges so as to achieve as high a percentage as possible. The focus gauge must be kept over the enemy and the higher the focus percentage, the smaller the gauge gets and the more precise the shot will be when taken. The speed gauge keeps the player's hand as close to their gun as possible without touching it, and the higher the speed percentage, the quicker the gun will be drawn. The player has two options in every duel - they can draw before their opponent and get a lower-scoring dishonourable kill or wait until the opponent has drawn and get a higher-scoring honourable kill.

Aside from the campaign, there is also an Arcade mode and a Duel mode. In Arcade mode, the player can pick from three different character classes, each with their own strengths and weaknesses. They must then face waves of enemies in locations taken from the campaign but modified specifically for Arcade play. In Duel mode, the player duels sequentially with all the end-of-level enemies from the campaign, with five lives to defeat all 15 opponents.

== Plot ==
The game begins in Abilene, Kansas in 1910, as legendary bounty hunter Silas Greaves enters a saloon and begins regaling those present (a sarcastic man named Jack, an old-timer called Steve, bartender Molly, a teenager named Dwight, and the barman, Ben) with tales of his adventures.

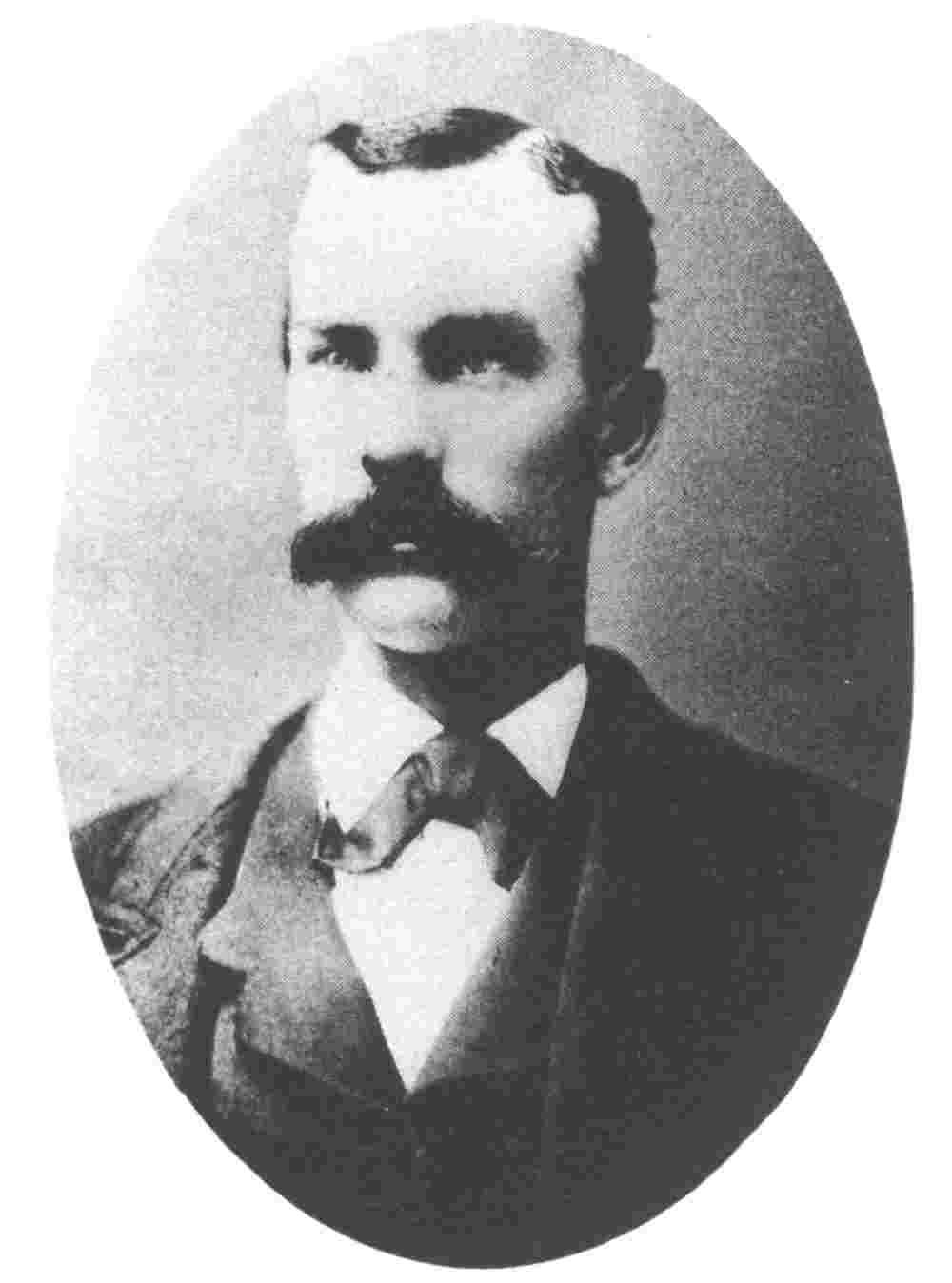
Johnny Ringo; one of the men Silas is hunting.

He begins in New Mexico Territory in December 1880. In the midst of the Lincoln County War, Silas is with the Regulators, an outfit led by Billy the Kid. He is hunting a man named Roscoe "Bob" Bryant who is riding with the John Kinney Gang, sworn enemies of the Regulators. After their hideout is attacked by a posse led by Pat Garrett, Billy and Silas are arrested, placed in a Lincoln jail, and sentenced to hang. However, four months later, Billy engineers a jailbreak and both he and Silas escape. Heading to Mexico, Silas is hired by the Rurales to track down the Cochise County Cowboys. Silas is especially keen to get his hands on cowboy Johnny Ringo, a past acquaintance of Bob's. He tracks the gang to Guadalupe Canyon, killing many of them, including their leader, Newman Haynes Clanton. Shortly thereafter, he tracks the remaining Cowboys, now led by Curly Bill Brocius, to Iron Springs, Arizona. Silas kills Bill, and several months later, he tracks down Ringo, also killing him.

After being well-paid for the deaths of Curly Bill and Ringo, Silas realises how much money is to be made in bounty hunting. He subsequently tracks and kills Henry Plummer, former sheriff of Bannack, Montana, who was accused of leading a gang of murderers and thieves called the Innocents. Next he tracks John Wesley Hardin, who he arrests in Abilene. He is then employed to hunt down a Chiricahua medicine man known as Grey Wolf who led a war party against the US Army in retaliation for an unprovoked massacre at his daughter's wedding. Grey Wolf, however, manages to elude Silas – the only outlaw to do so. He next tracks and defeats the Dalton Gang after their disastrous attempt to rob two banks at the same time in Coffeyville, Kansas.

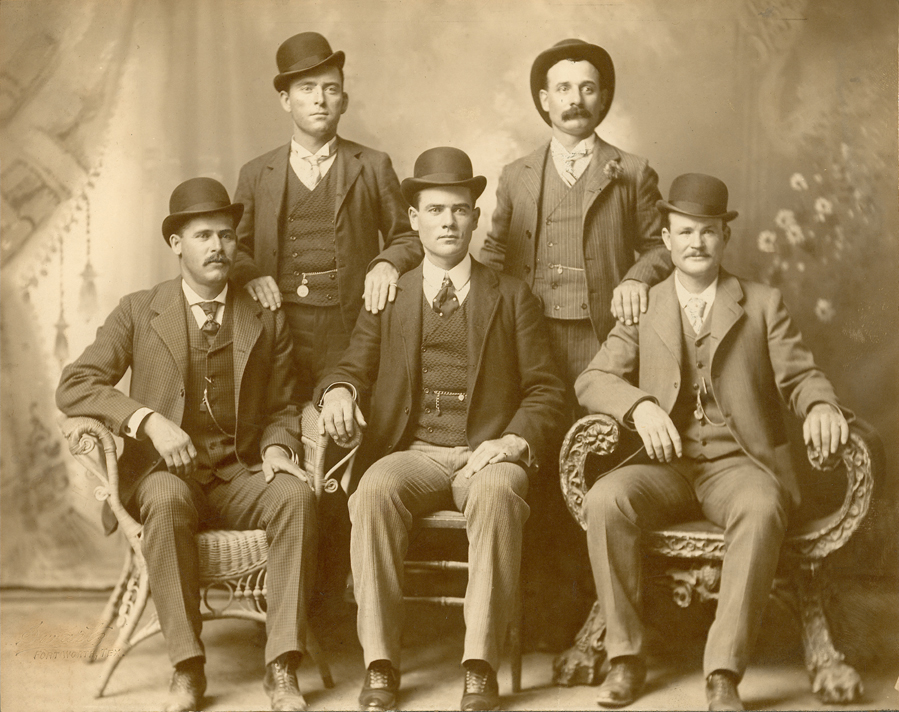
Sundance Kid (front row, left) and Butch Cassidy (front row, right), along with other members of the Wild Bunch

Silas then explains that he wants Bob dead because in 1868 in Juarez, Bob, Ringo, and Jim Reed were responsible for the deaths of Silas's two older brothers, and almost killed Silas himself. Returning to his story, in June 1899, Silas hears that Bob is riding with the Wild Bunch. However, after confronting and killing George Curry, Silas finds no trace of Bob. Five years later, he hears that the gang are back together, under the leadership of Kid Curry. He tracks them to Parachute, Colorado, eliminating most of them before confronting Curry, who taunts him by saying that Bob is in Bolivia with Butch Cassidy and the Sundance Kid. Frustrated, he kills Curry.

Silas then backtracks to November 1881, when Jim Reed was riding with the James–Younger Gang. After interrupting an attempt to rob the Rock Island Railroad near Winston, Missouri, Silas confronts and wounds Jesse James. Jim and Frank James escape into the Ozarks, but Silas quickly finds Frank, who points him towards Jim. Eventually, Silas finds and kills Jim.

Six months prior to Silas visiting Abilene, he hears that Butch and Sundance, who are thought dead, have returned to the United States. Hoping Bob may be with them, Silas tracks them down to a ghost town in the Wind River Range. Questioning his own morality, he notes, "by this point in my storied career, I'd killed more men than Bob Bryant ever had." He is then confronted by the ghosts of the men he's encountered. Eventually, he confronts Butch and Sundance, killing them both. But again, there's no sign of Bob.

At this point, Jack loses his temper with Silas, accusing him of making the whole thing up. Silas then reveals that Ben is actually Bob and that the purpose of his stories was to provoke reactions from the barman and determine the kind of man he had become. The player is presented with the choice of either killing Bob or letting him live. If the player chooses to kill him, everyone's attitude towards Silas changes. Molly goes to get the sheriff, as Steve ushers a shaken Dwight, to whom he refers as "Young Eisenhower", out of the saloon. As Silas leaves, Steve asks him where he's going, to which he replies, "Doesn't really matter, does it? I've sold my soul for revenge." If the player chooses not to kill Bob, Silas acknowledges that he's become a cold-blooded killer, and he can't remember what life was like before he began chasing revenge. He asks Dwight his name and is told it's Dwight Eisenhower and when he learns that Dwight is on his way to West Point, Silas tells him, "don't tear down the world out of anger and spite like I did. You build it up. You do something decent with your life." The game ends as he leaves the saloon.

== Development ==
=== Return to the Wild West ===
The first hint of the game came on November 23, 2011, when Ubisoft sent an email through UPlay to registered owners of The Cartel asking them which Call of Juarez game was their favourite and how would they rate The Cartel itself. The email also included a series of gameplay set-pieces, asking players which they'd most like to see in an "as yet unannounced" game, with options including "hunting an outlaw in the Rocky Mountains", "rescuing an innocent man about to be hanged", "guarding a fort against a group of outlaws", "defending a train", and "preventing outlaws from pillaging a gold mine".

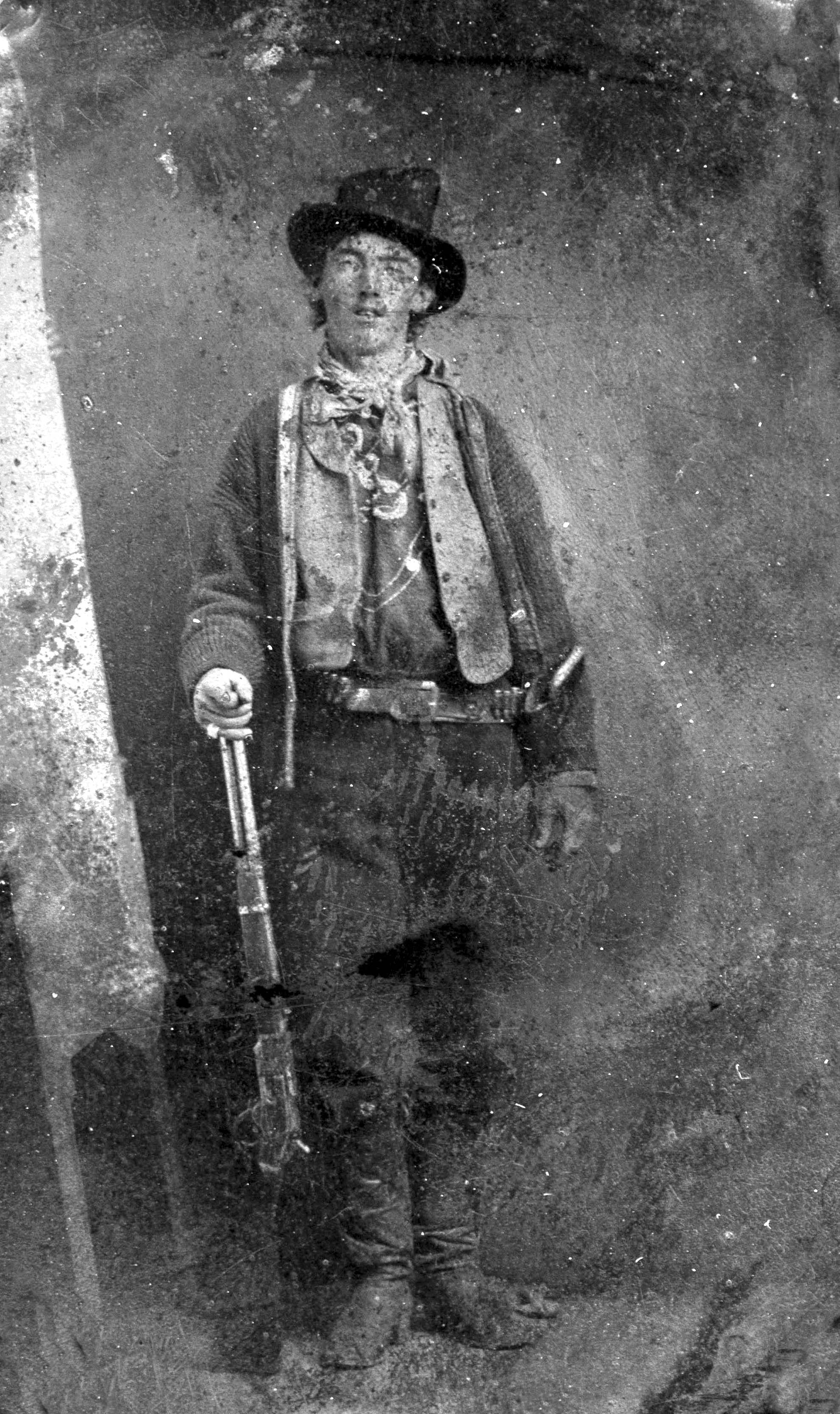
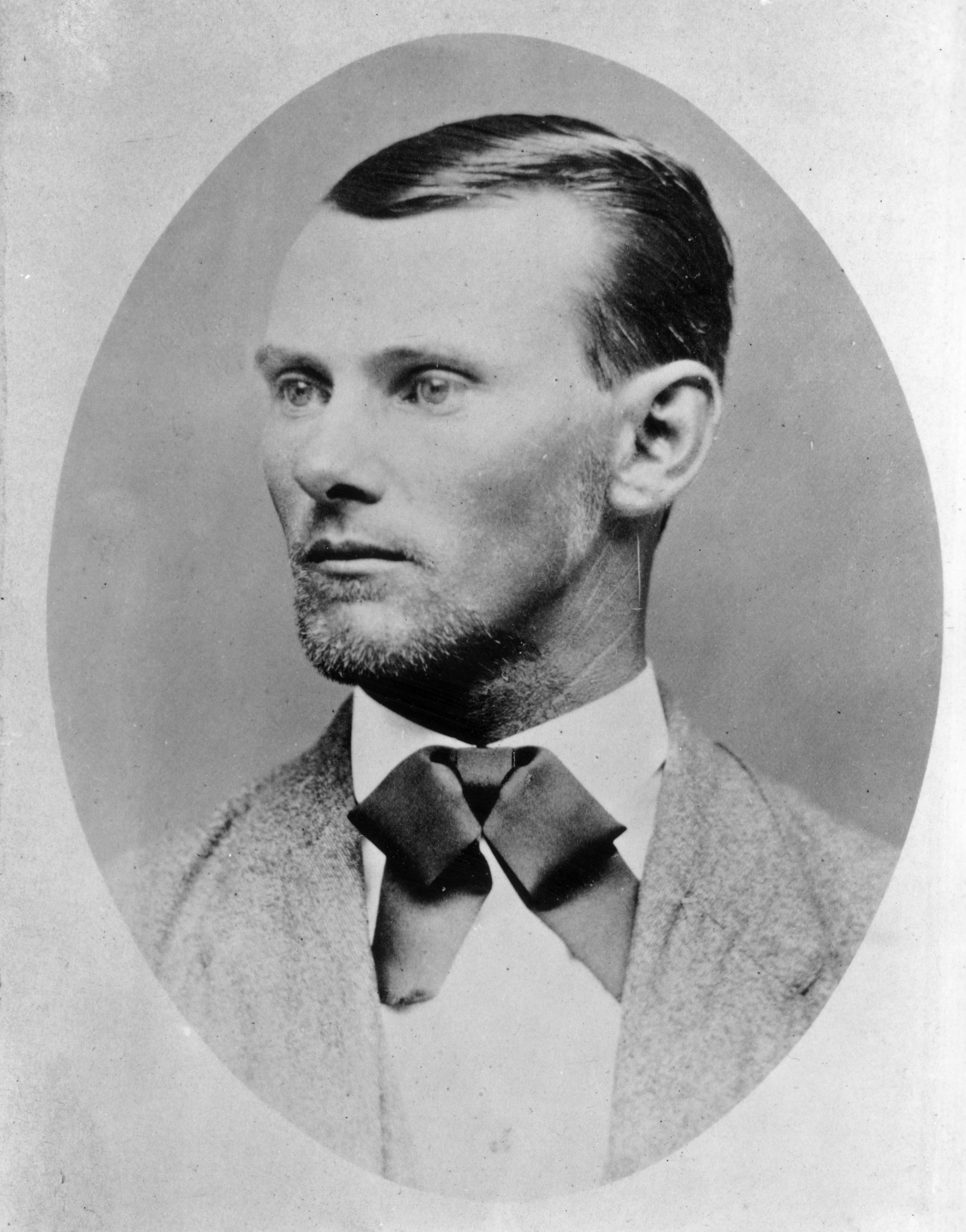
Billy the Kid (left) and Jesse James (right) - two of the legendary Wild West figures who appear in the game

Nothing more was heard about the game until September 5, 2012, when the official Call of Juarez Facebook page was updated with an image of a cowboy seated at a bar and the date "09.06.12" written above. Gunslinger was announced the following day, with Ubisoft revealing that Techland were once again developing, and that the game would be a digital-only budget title for Microsoft Windows (via UPlay and Steam), PlayStation 3 (via the PlayStation Store), and Xbox 360 (via Xbox Live Arcade). They emphasised that the game would feature legendary Wild West figures such as Billy the Kid, Pat Garrett, Wyatt Earp, Butch Cassidy, and Jesse James, and that for the first time in the series, an experience point-based skill progression system would be utilised, allowing players to customise their fighting style as the game progresses.

Addressing why the team had returned to the Wild West after setting The Cartel in the modern-day, Techland's international brand manager, Błażej Krakowiak, stated, "we did so for a number of reasons, but basically because of what we've heard from fans and the fact that we're ready to believe that this is where the series belongs." Similarly, Ubisoft associate producer Nicolas Joye said that the failure and negative fan reaction to The Cartel had been instructive, admitting they had tried things with the game which simply didn't work; "we learned a lot of lessons, in terms of production organisation, production value that we should put into the game, what to focus on." At PAX 2013, Ubisoft brand manager Aymeric Evennou echoed both Krakowiak and Joye in acknowledging that the franchise should remain in the Wild West, and that The Cartel had been a failure; "this is where the brand belongs. We tried something else, but now we're fully dedicated to please the fans."

The designers wanted to do more than return to the West just for the sake of it or just because fans wanted it, however. Instead, their aspirations went further, with Krakowiak explaining, "just going back to what worked is definitely not our ambition. We want to move forward on the storytelling side and the gameplay side." Indeed, Techland knew another subpar game would kill the franchise, with design expert Xavier Penin, who also contributed to the script, stating, "we were on a mission to save the Call of Juarez brand, literally."

=== Research ===
As with both the original Call of Juarez and Bound in Blood, the team did a lot of historical research during preproduction. However, as with both of those games, they didn't strictly adhere to historical precedent or realism. According to Krakowiak,

we learn the truth, and then we ignore half of it, because this is what everyone expects, this is how the whole thing actually works in our minds. We don't want to hear that Billy the Kid didn't kill twenty-one people, he killed maybe only seven [...] Finding this balance between the truth and legend is interesting.

Along the same lines, he stated, "we don't think it would be really interesting to focus purely on history. It's like with pirates. We have too many romantic ideas and expectations about them."

The weaponry in the game was approached similarly, achieving "a balance between realism and fun." In some early gameplay tests, the guns behaved exactly as they would have in reality, but according to Krakowiak, "it just wasn't fun. So we have made them more accurate, faster and so on. It's exactly what we did with Bound in Blood.

=== Narrative ===
In terms of the game's narrative, which is self-consciously a mixture of fact and fiction, Joye explains that in the earliest stages of development, the team tried to narrow down what makes this period of history so specific, and "what we came up was the stories, the legends, the mixture between myth and truth. So we really focused on the storytelling and narration."

The outline of the story was conceived by producer Krzysztof Nosek and writer Rafał W. Orkan, who brought it to Techland's regular writer, Haris Orkin, without characters or specific story elements in place. Wanting the actual narration to be as important as the narrative, they told Orkin that the storyline needed to be structured like Bastion, whereby things in the game world would change in front of the players' eyes, based upon what was being said in the narration. Orkin loved the idea, as it paralleled how the legends of the West were formed in the first place - myths and exaggeration overtook fact and reality, and so the question of truth versus embellishment became a major part of the story; "we decided our narrator would be unreliable and that the world would change as the story changed. I thought that perfectly mimicked how the history of the West was written in the first place." Orkin was particularly inspired by John Ford's The Man Who Shot Liberty Valance (1962) and Arthur Penn's Little Big Man (1970), both of which deal with myths overtaking reality in the public consciousness. A quote from Liberty Valance, "when the legend becomes fact, print the legend", became a central idea in Orkin's script.

Of the use of the unreliable narrator, Orkin says,

I thought that the use of this unreliable narrator would help us with a narrative problem always present in shooters. Ludonarrative dissonance, a term first coined by Clint Hocking, is when the game's mechanics directly clash with the narrative and story. Most playable characters in shooters are brutal mass murderers, mowing down hundreds if not thousands. Yet, we still want the player to believe the person they are piloting has a conscience and is not a complete homicidal maniac. In Gunslinger the storyteller is exaggerating his exploits to improve the story and make himself into more of a hero than he might have been. Since the player is playing his story, it makes sense (and makes fun of the fact) that he/she can defeat hundreds of enemies single-handedly.

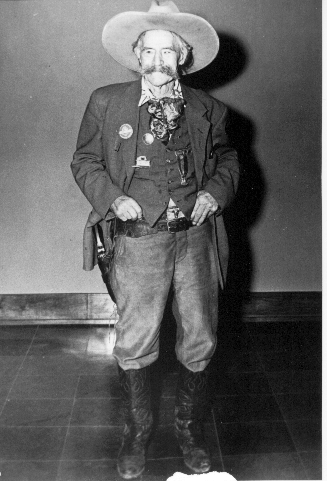
Frank Eaton, upon whom Silas was partially based

Silas himself was based partly on Clint Eastwood's character in Sergio Leone's Dollars Trilogy and partly on Frank Eaton.

=== Graphics and style ===
The importance of storytelling and the overlap between fact and myth also became important in relation to the game's graphical style. Many of the cutscenes employ a comic book aesthetic, with separate panels telling a dynamic story. According to Krakowiak, this is to continually reinforce to the player the idea that they are playing through a story being told by someone, who may not be entirely truthful; "the whole thing is a mix of historical truth and the legends built around it, so a comic book style seems to be tailor made for something like this."

This is also why the designers opted for a cel shaded in-game graphical style; "it's almost realistic. But we apply a slight cel-shaded approach, so the whole thing looks a bit like a 'Wild West Hero' story."

=== Digital storefront removal ===
On March 31, 2018, without any indication as to why, The Cartel and Gunslinger were removed from Steam, the PlayStation Store, and Xbox Live. On April 12, Ubisoft explained that the reason for the removal was "per the terms of agreement, Call of Juarez: The Cartel and Call of Juarez: Gunslinger licensing/publishing rights have reverted back to Techland, while others remain active with Ubisoft. This is why a few titles have recently been removed, but it is our understanding that Techland is working to bring those titles back." Gunslinger returned to all three platforms on April 30, with Techland stating, "as Techland Publishing moves forward as a leading publisher, we are delighted to welcome Call of Juarez: Gunslinger to our publishing division."

=== Nintendo Switch port ===
On October 8, 2018, the Call of Juarez Facebook page was updated for the first time in over five years, adding a banner with Silas and the tagline "Legends never die." Another new image showed Silas standing over a canyon with the quote, "I haven't been here in many years." On October 9, a Nintendo Switch version of the game was rated by the Entertainment Software Rating Board.

On October 17, Techland sent out Wild West-themed postcards to game journalists, complete with coffee stains, era-appropriate iconography, and a picture of Silas playing the game on Switch. The postcard also promised a reveal on October 24. That reveal proved to be the announcement of the port.

== Reception ==
Reception

Aggregate score
Aggregator	Score			
Aggregator	NS	PC	PS3	Xbox 360
Metacritic	72/100	79/100	75/100	76/100

Review scores
Publication	Score			
Publication	NS	PC	PS3	Xbox 360
4Players	59%			
Destructoid		8.5/10		
Game Informer			8/10	8/10
GameSpot				8/10
GamesRadar+			3.5/5	
IGN			7.5/10	
Nintendo Life	8/10			
PlayStation Official Magazine – UK			7/10	
Official Xbox Magazine (UK)				7/10
Official Xbox Magazine (US)				8/10
PC Gamer (US)		84/100		
Polygon		9/10	9/10	
TheGamer	3/5			
TheSixthAxis	8/10			

Call of Juarez: Gunslinger received "generally favorable" reviews across all systems, with the PC version holding an aggregate score of 79 out of 100 on Metacritic, based on twenty-three reviews, the PlayStation 3 version holding a score of 75 out of 100, based on sixteen reviews, the Xbox 360 version holding a score of 76 out of 100, based on thirty-six reviews, and the Nintendo Switch version holding a score of 72 out of 100, based on fourteen reviews.

Polygon's Justin McElroy scored the PC and PlayStation 3 versions 9 out of 10, praising the shooting mechanics, narration, and the inclusion of arcade mode. He concluded, "pure, outlandish Spaghetti Western gunfights have never been more thrilling." Destructoid's James Stephanie Sterling scored the PC version 8.5 out of 10 and was surprised by how polished the game was, especially considering how much they despised The Cartel. Calling it the "best damn game in the series", they wrote, "it packs more entertainment into its humble package than all the other Juarez games combined." They praised the writing, humour, art style, voice acting, the use of a metanarrative, and the shooting mechanics. Although they felt it was occasionally repetitive, especially in relation to the limited arsenal available to the player, they concluded, "I wholly recommend it to fans [...] Not only is Gunslinger the best Call of Juarez game, it's a damn fine and worthy shooter in its own right."

PC Gamer's Richard Cobbett scored the PC version 84 out of 100, lamenting that it was a short budget-game when the quality was good enough to support a full retail-game. He concluded, "it makes the idea of another Call of Juarez game at some time in the future surprisingly appealing." Game Informer's Dan Ryckert scored the PS3 and Xbox versions 8 out of 10, praising arcade mode, the shooting mechanics, and the narrative. He wrote, "the game certainly doesn't turn any FPS conventions on their ears, but it still presents tense and entertaining shootouts frequently."

GameSpot's Mark Watson scored the Xbox 360 version 8 out 10. Calling it a "remarkable shooter", "a breath of fresh air," and "tight and controlled," he praised the shooting mechanics, level design, humour, duelling ("precise and fun"), and arcade mode ("an absolute blast"). On the other hand, he was somewhat critical of the non-duel boss battles, which he found shallow. He concluded, "Call of Juarez: Gunslinger is a whole heap of Western fun and a thoroughly welcome return to form." Official Xbox Magazine's Scott Butterworth scored the Xbox version 8 out of 10 praising its "near AAA-caliber execution." He praised the shooting mechanics, although he would have preferred a cover system, and he found the level design suffered from a "lack of subtlety." Nevertheless, he concluded, "there's nothing wrong with doing something simple very, very well, and at this price, we're willing to forgive certain problems."

IGN's Colin Moriarty scored the PS3 version 7.5 out of 10, praising the storytelling, the gunplay, and the voice acting. However, he was very critical of the duelling system ("borderline nonsensical and immersion-breaking"). He concluded, "it has a lot of charm in its short but appropriately wild Old Western campaign, with an excellent storytelling twist and fast-paced arcadey gunplay against wily black-hats." GamesRadar+'s Lorenzo Veloria scored the PS3 version 3.5 out of 5. He thought the game succeeded in creating a score-based shooter with an interesting environment and narration, but he disliked the boss battles. He also praised the shooting mechanics and the graphics. He concluded, "those who want a solid Western shooter with exhilarating mechanics, you'll want to give this game a try." Writing for the UK's PlayStation Official Magazine, Emma Davis scored the PlayStation version 7 out of 10, writing, "simple, arcadey fun is on offer if you approach this on its own, rather silly terms."

=== Nintendo Switch ===
Nintendo Life's Chris Scullion scored the Switch version 8 out of 10, calling it "one of the better-looking first-person shooters we've seen on the Switch." Finding it to be "a solid port", he praised the adaptation to the Switch's Joy-Con, and concluded, "it's an entertaining adventure, which does clever things with its story structure." TheSixthAxis's Thomas Hughes scored it 8 out of 10, praising the use of motion control ("I can not stress enough just how fun this addition is."). He concluded, "the Switch port is an excellent way to experience the series for the first time."

TheGamer's Fox Tanner scored it 3 out of 5. He praised the narrative but was critical of the controls. He also disliked the implementation of motion control ("it often seems to impair more than aid"). Nevertheless, he found the game to be "arcadey shooting action at its absolute best," and he concluded, "it's more than worth the asking price of twenty dollars." 4Players's Benjamin Schmädig scored it 59%. He was critical of the graphics and frame rate ("so low that it is physically uncomfortable to play the game at times"), opining that the poor presentation made targeting very difficult. Arguing that it is "one of those games that should not have been published in its current form," he concluded, "Gunslinger joins the ranks of games that do not really fit the Switch."

=== Sales ===
The game was the third best-selling PSN title in May 2013, coming behind Far Cry 3: Blood Dragon and Terraria. In July, Ubisoft released its first quarterly financial report, in which they revealed that digital downloads were up 27% from the same time period the previous year. They cited the strong sales of Blood Dragon and Gunslinger.
