= Seven Rivers =

Seven Rivers may refer to:

- Rigvedic rivers, in the northwestern Indian subcontinent
- Seven Rivers, New Mexico, United States
  - Seven Rivers Warriors
  - Seven Rivers Formation
- Seven Rivers Cycling Team, a professional road bicycle racing team in Astana, Kazakhstan
- Seven Rivers of Gondor, in J. R. R. Tolkien's writings
- Seven Rivers, The Series, an extensive written work, by Johnny B. L. Burke

== See also ==
- River Seven, in North Yorkshire, England
