= Selman's Scouts =

- Founded: 1878
- Founders: John Selman; Tom Selman
- Founding location: Lincoln County, New Mexico
- Years active: September 1878-28 June 1880
- Membership: 13
- Leaders: John Selman; Tom Selman; Jesse Evans
- Activities: Robbery, cattle rustling and murders

Selman's Scouts, also called The Rustlers, the Wrestlers and later Selman-Evans gang, was a gang formed by brothers John and younger brother Tom Cat Selman in 1878 in Lincoln County, New Mexico, during the Lincoln County War, when they coalesced with the Murphy-Dolan faction. Sometimes they called themselves simply as Scouts because they claimed they were under the authority of Sheriff George Peppin.

They were notorious for their brutality and they robbed stores, rustled cattle and horses, ransacked villages, raped women and murdered men and boys. They were active in Seven Rivers, New Mexico, and it was composed by Texas desperadoes, including Augustus M. "Gus" Gildea, Reese Gobles (rumored that his body was found in a drift down the Pecos River), John Gross, Rustling Bob Irwin (he was found dead in the Pecos River, killed by his own party because he was involved in activities outside the gang), Charles Snow, John Nelson, Bill Dwyer, Bob Speakes, V. S. Whitaker, Jake Owens and Marion Turner. Edward "Little" Hart, who was also a member, was killed by Selman in a dispute over who should be leader, and by 1880 his brother Tom was apprehended and lynched by the Tin Hat Brigade.

In September 1878 the gang went on a three-week rampage through Lincoln County killing, raping, robbing anyone and destroying anything in their path. On 28 September 1878 they demolished Will Hudgen's saloon outside Fort Stanton after threatening and insulting his wife and sister. In Lincoln they ransacked houses, but were repulsed by gunfire when they attempted to take over Issac Ellis' store, and in the south they continued their depravities at José Chavez y Sanchez ranch shooting and killing two of his sons, Clato and Desiderio. They raped two women at Bartlett Ranch, in Rio Bonita they shot and killed three young boys, and they raided the George Coe ranch on the Hondo River, where they mortally wounded Martin Sanchez son.

In October 1878 the gang encamped on the Pecos River, they were playing poker game, an argument broke up and John shot and killed the chief on the spot. A large posse led by Lincoln resident Juan Patron chased the gang and killed several of them in a gun battle in the limit of Fort Sumner.

In March 1879 some of the gang members appeared in a most-wanted list made by New Mexico Governor Lew Wallace, including John and Tom Selman, Reese Gobles, Bob Speakes, Gus Gildea, Jake Owens and Rustling Bob Irwin. All were indicted in April for the murders in September 1878, but none came to trial. He left New Mexico and signed up 175 recruits renagades for a large-scale rustling operation in western Texas, but they schemed and began to fall apart and broke the association. John caught Mexican black smallpox, which wasted his body and pitted his face, and almost died.

When he recovered himself he reorganized the gang with Jesse Evans to terrorize between Fort Davis and Fort Stockton, Texas area. He really planned to organize it along John Kinney Gang or The Cowboys. He assumed the name Captain John Tyson and stayed on Fort Davis (he previously assumed the alias of John Goss/Gross and John Gunter/Gunther). They opened a butcher shop to expand their rustling and holdup operations. Local residents, unabled to cope called on Texas Rangers for help and Sergeant L. B. Caruthers recognized him as a fugitive from Shackelford County.

On 28 June 1880 he was arrested and imprisoned in the jail at Fort Davis. Jesse Evans and other gang members were later arrested and sentenced in October to the Huntsville Penitentiary after a gun battle in which one gang member and ranger were killed. John was not brought to trial and returned to Shackelford County to answer for his crimes. In August Rangers took him to Comanche County to await court, he was later moved to Albany, but guards, by prearrangment, removed his manacles, gave him a horse and reached Mexico.

== Bibliography ==
- DeArment, Robert K. (April 1, 1996). George Scarborough: The Life and Death of a Lawman on the Closing Frontier. University of Oklahoma Press. pp. 64–65. ISBN 9780806128504.
- Dolan, Samuel K. (December 4, 2020). Hell Paso: Life and Death in the Old West's Most Dangerous Town. Rowman & Littlefield. p. 456. ISBN 9781493041510.
- Mills, James B. (July 15, 2022). Billy the Kid: El Bandido Simpático. University of North Texas Press. p. 736. ISBN 9781574418798.
