= James W. Bell =

American sheriff

- Born: 1841 or 1853; Georgia or Maryland
- Died: April 28, 1881; Lincoln, New Mexico
- Occupations: Miner, Texas Ranger and deputy sheriff

James W. Bell (1841/1853–28 April 1881), also referred to as "Long" Bell, "Lone" Bell or Jim Long, was a Deputy Sheriff of the United States Marshals Service. He was shot and killed by Billy the Kid during his escape from Lincoln County jail on 28 April 1881.

== Biography ==
Bell was born in Georgia in 1853 with both father from Virginia, but some historians claimed he was born in Maryland in 1841. He was a miner and Texas Ranger. It is also claimed he was a private in Company D., Frontier Battalion, of Captain Dan W. Roberts, but according to Bill Reynolds he was Joseph William Bell, who was born on 17 May 1849 in Ohio.

On 13 December 1873 he enlisted as private in G. W. Campbell's Montague County Rangers and was discharged on 13 February 1877. In the spring of 1879 Oscar W. Williams, Bell's mining companion, organized a mining party from Dallas, Texas to New Mexico and Leadville, Colorado, and included Bell to take part in mining ventures. They travelled northwest across Staked Plains and arrived on 5 July 1879 at Tascosa, a small settlement in the Texas Panhandle. There were a strike twenty-four miles south of Santa Fe, in Carbonateville, near present-day Cerrillos, New Mexico, and when they arrived there, they were disbanded.

Williams and Bell remained together there and they set up camps, staked out some mining properties and made forays. White Oaks offered better promise and Bell drifted alone and arrived in 1880, being actively engaged in mining activities in Nogal and Jicarilla Mountains, where he had a fine prospect alongside R. D. Lypard.

On the evening of 22 November 1880 someone tried to steal his horses, and the next day he rode with a posse headed by Deputy Sheriff Will Hudgens to Blake's sawmill, gang's camp, near town, but it was deserted. They trailed the gang to Coyote Springs where several horses but no men were killed after a gunfight. They escaped and the posse returned to White Oaks. At that night the gang rode into White Oaks and shot Jim Redman in front of Will Hudgens saloon, and in response Jimmy Carlyle and Bell shot but failed. Bell and Carlyle trailed Billy the Kid, Billy Wilson and Dave Rudabaugh forty miles north to Jim Greathouse-Fred Kuch ranch, also called Greathouse ranch or tavern, where Carlyle was killed.

In 1881 he became one of Pat Garrett's deputy sheriffs in Lincoln County, and they became friends. He later was titled as United States Deputy Marshall, but no mention was found in United States Marshall archives, so he may have been employed on an "as-needed" service. On 15 December 1881 Pat Garrett and his pose headed to Puerto de Luna in pursuit of Billy the Kid hideout. Leaving Alexander Grzelachowski ranch, they followed them to Los Ojitos, Fort Sumner, where Tom O'Folliard was shot and killed, to Wilcox and Brazil ranch, the edge of the Llano Estacado, and finally to a rock hut in Stinking Springs, where they surrendered the next morning.

Bell joined the contingent as Garrett guard and they set off toward Las Vegas. On 26 December 1881 he helped load the prisoners aboard a wagon, where a large angry crowd was waiting, and while the posse were waiting to start the trip to Santa Fe, they gathered and intended to snatch Rudabaugh, who previously killed Las Vegas jailer during his escape.

== Death ==
Subsequently, Billy the Kid was sentenced to hang for the murder of Sheriff William Brady at Old Mesilla, and he was brought back to Lincoln. Bell and Robert Olinger were assigned as jailers and to guard him. Billy found a previously hidden revolver under the toilet seat or he wrested from Bell when they backed up the stairs to walk down, and on 28 April 1881 he shot Bell twice and killed him. Bell ran into Gottfried George Gauss, caretaker of the courthouse at that time, and expired the same moment.

George Washington Mitchell was appointed administrator of pitifully small Bell's state and property, which consisted of 7.75 dollars owed to I. N. Bell and 2.20 to J. Tomlinson.

Bodies of Olinger and Bell were sent to Fort Stanton, where Olinger was buried in the cemetery there, but it is uncertain where Bell was buried. He was sent to White Oaks, where his family lived, or Lincoln. In any case, on 19 July 2003 the White Oaks Cemetery Association, headed by Bessie Leslie, and cooperated by New Mexico Sheriffs' and Police Association, erected a monument to Bell. They chose Cedarvale Cemetery, White Oaks.

== Bibliography ==
- Garrett, Patrick Floyd; Nolan, Frederick W. (2000). The Authentic Life of Billy the Kid. University of Oklahoma Press.
- Haldane, Roberta Key (August 15, 2013). Gold-Mining Boomtown: People of White Oaks, Lincoln County, New Mexico Territory. University of Oklahoma Press. pp. 44–48. ISBN 9780806188300.
- Keleher, William Aloysius (2007). Simmons, Marc (ed.). Violence in Lincoln County, 1869-1881. Sunstone Press. p. 440. ISBN 9780865346222.
- Reynolds, William (1994). Trouble in New Mexico: The Outlaws, Gunmen, Desperados, Murderers and Lawmen for Fifty Turbulent Years.
