= Seven Rivers Warriors =

Outlaw gang of the Old West

The Seven Rivers Warriors was an outlaw gang of the Old West known primarily due to its part in the Pecos War and the Lincoln County War.

== Formation ==
The gang was initially formed during the mid-1870s by disgruntled small ranchers, feeling themselves victimized by the large cattle holdings of ranchers such as John Chisum. In 1876 they allied themselves with the Murphy-Dolan faction, mainly due to John Tunstall and Alexander McSween being allied with Chisum.

The gang was led, for the most part, by Henry M. "Hugh" Beckwith, whose brothers John and Bob were also members. The gang had certain influential connections with local law enforcement, which enabled them to engage in cattle rustling without interference: Bob Beckwith and Wallace Olinger were Deputy Sheriffs for Sheriff William J. Brady, and gang member Bob Olinger was a Deputy US Marshal. Tom Walker, an uncle to later famed Texas Ranger Lon Oden, also became a member.

== Lincoln County War ==
The gang began harassing the Tunstall-McSween faction in 1876, often riding with the Jesse Evans Gang and the John Kinney Gang, with both those gangs also being employed by the Murphy-Dolan faction. On February 18, 1878, members of the Evans Gang led by Jesse Evans killed John Tunstall, sparking the Lincoln County War. The Lincoln County Regulators were formed shortly thereafter to counter the gunmen hired by Murphy-Dolan. The Regulators included Billy the Kid, Richard "Dick" Brewer, Charlie Bowdre and Doc Scurlock, but numbered some forty riders in all.

On April 1, 1878, Sheriff Brady and Deputy Sheriff George Hindman were killed by Billy the Kid and other Regulators in Lincoln, New Mexico. On April 29, 1878, members of the Seven Rivers Gang killed Regulator Frank McNab and badly wounded Regulator Ab Saunders, in addition to capturing Frank Coe. On April 30, 1878, Seven Rivers members Tom Green, Charles Marshall, Jim Patterson and John Galvin were killed in Lincoln, and although the Regulators were blamed, that was never proven, and there were feuds going inside the Seven Rivers Warriors at that time.

What is known for certain is that Seven Rivers member "Dutch Charlie" Kruling was shot and wounded by Regulator George Coe on the morning of April 30. Some time after this, Seven Rivers gang member Wallace Olinger allowed Frank Coe to escape, giving him a pistol in the process. The Regulators tracked down and killed Seven Rivers rider Manuel Segovia on May 15, 1878, who was believed to have killed McNab with a shotgun.

What would become known as the Battle of Lincoln began on July 15, 1878, lasting five days, with Bob Beckwith being killed during a gun battle with the Regulators on July 19. For all practical purposes, the Lincoln County War ended after that siege, despite the fight itself being a draw and with all but one of the Regulators escaping.

== Downfall ==
After the range war came to an end, the Seven Rivers members began to turn on one another. Gang member Bill Johnson was killed by Hugh Beckwith on August 17, 1878, in Seven Rivers, New Mexico. John Beckwith was killed by fellow member John Jones on August 26, 1879, also in Seven Rivers. On November 23, 1879, gang member Tom Walker was killed in a saloon gunfight in Seven Rivers. Gang member and Deputy US Marshal Bob Olinger was killed by Billy the Kid, along with Deputy Sheriff James Bell, on April 28, 1881, during a jail escape. By this time the gang had fallen apart, with the members all going their own ways. Some went back to ranching or working as cowboys, while some became lawmen. Hugh Beckwith, the gang's leader, continued his outlaw life, but was shot and killed while committing the armed robbery of a general store in Presidio, Texas in 1892.
