= John Kinney (outlaw) =

American criminal (1847–1919)

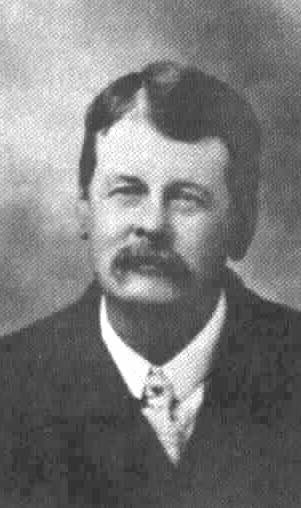
- Born: John Kinney; 1847; Hampshire County, Massachusetts
- Died: August 15, 1919 (aged 71–72); Prescott, Arizona, U.S.
- Occupations: former soldier and miner
- Organization: United States Army
- Status: deceased
- Conviction: cattle rustling
- Criminal charge: cattle rustling
- Penalty: imprisonment

Details
- Victims: 3
- Date: December 31, 1875
- Span of crimes: 1875–1883
- Killed: 2 soldiers
- Injured: 1 civilian
- Date apprehended: 1883

John Kinney (c. 1847 – August 25, 1919) was an outlaw of the Old West, who formed the John Kinney Gang.

Kinney was born in Hampshire County, Massachusetts around 1847. His family later moved to Iowa, and in 1865, after the Civil War ended, Kinney enlisted in the US Army. At the rank of sergeant, Kinney was mustered out of the army in 1873. He settled in Doña Ana County, New Mexico, and for reasons unknown organized a gang, which began committing acts of robbery and cattle rustling. Jesse Evans was one of the early members. On December 31, 1875, Kinney, Evans, Jim McDaniels and Pony Diehl entered a saloon in Las Cruces, New Mexico, where they became involved in a brawl with Cavalry soldiers from Fort Seldon. The outlaws were beaten badly and thrown out of the saloon. They returned shortly thereafter and opened fire, killing two soldiers and one civilian, and wounding two other soldiers and one civilian.

Not long afterwards, Evans broke away from the gang to form the Jesse Evans Gang. Kinney enlisted his gang in the El Paso Salt War. Then both gangs were later enlisted by the "Murphy-Dolan Faction" at the outset of the Lincoln County War, and it was Jesse Evans and members of his gang who killed John Tunstall, spurring Billy the Kid and his "Regulators" into action. During the battle and siege of the McSween house, Billy the Kid fired a shot that hit Kinney in the face, but he survived. In 1878, Kinney was arrested for the murder of Ysabel Barela, but was acquitted.

In 1883 Kinney was arrested for cattle rustling and sentenced to prison. Released in 1886, he did not return to his outlaw life. By that time all the members of his former gang were either dead or in prison or had disappeared. He served in the US Army during the Spanish–American War, and was successful as a miner in Chaparral Gulch, Arizona before retiring to Prescott, where he died on August 25, 1919.
