= John Wallace Olinger =

American Old West lawman (1849–1940)

Personal details
- Born: May 3, 1849 Delphi, Indiana
- Died: February 25, 1940 (aged 90) Van Nuys, California
- Cause of death: Broncho-pneumonia
- Occupation: Lawman

Military service
- Battles/wars: Lincoln County War

John Wallace Olinger (3 May 1849 - 25 February 1940) was a lawman from New Mexico.

While the family moved to Indian Territory, he went down to Seven Rivers, New Mexico, where he was a member of the Seven Rivers Warriors who fought in the Lincoln County War. He was deputized alongside his older brother Bob Olinger by George Peppin to fight against Lincoln County Regulators, led by Alexander McSween. A few months later, he participated in a gunfight on behalf of his ranch partner and wounded a man.

He was involved in a gun battle near Lincoln on 30 April 30 1878, when his posse caught up with Frank McNab, who was slain, Abe Sanders, who was seriously wounded, and Frank Coe, who was captured when he ran out of ammunition and later escaped custody in May, allowed by Olinger. In August, Olinger was arrested for shooting one party in a dispute involving his family's business partner, but he was later released and retired.

He later moved to Los Angeles where he died of broncho-pneumonia at Van Nuys, California on 25 February 1940.
