= Bob Olinger =

American Old West lawman (1850–1881)

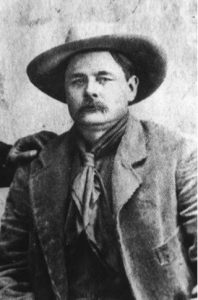

Personal details
- Born: Robert Ameridith Olinger c. 1850 Delphi, Indiana, United States
- Died: April 28, 1881 (aged 30–31) Lincoln, New Mexico, United States
- Resting place: Fort Stanton Cemetery, New Mexico
- Occupation: Lawman

Military service
- Battles/wars: Lincoln County War

Robert Ameredith B. "Pecos Bob" Olinger (1850 in Delphi, Indiana – April 28, 1881 in Lincoln, New Mexico) was a frontier lawman best known as the last victim of Billy the Kid and as a participant in the Lincoln County War.

== Early life and career ==
Ameredith Robert B. Olinger was born around March 1850 to William C. Olinger and his wife Rebecca Robinson in Carroll County, Indiana. They moved to Delaware, Polk County, Iowa and were living there at the time of the 1856 Iowa State Census. The Olingers then moved to Mound City, Linn County, Kansas Territory, arriving there in 1858. They were still there when the 1860 U.S. Census was taken. William C. Olinger died at age 37 in 1861. His widow, Rebecca, remarried to a Joshua Stafford. The Stafford-Olinger family was living in Scott, Bourbon County, Kansas in 1865. The family then moved to the Indian Territory, which would later become Oklahoma. The family then moved to Grayson County, Texas, about 1874, as Rebecca Stafford is listed on the County tax rolls for 1874, 1875 and 1876. Robert Olinger is listed in the 1875 Grayson County, Texas, tax rolls. His brother John Wallace Olinger and his ranching partner, William Harrison Johnson, arrived at Seven Rivers, New Mexico, and stayed at the Beckwith Ranch. Robert, along with his mother, arrived sometime later.

Bob Olinger later participated in the Lincoln County War as part of the Murphy-Dolan faction before being assigned as a deputy for famed lawman Pat Garrett after Garrett was elected Sheriff of Lincoln County in 1880. After the capture of Billy the Kid, Olinger was one of two deputies assigned to guard him in the Lincoln County Courthouse, the other being James Bell.

== Death ==
On April 28, 1881, while guarding Billy the Kid with Bell, Olinger left to go across the street to the Wortley Hotel to have lunch. During this time, "the Kid" overwhelmed Bell and shot him as Bell attempted to run down the courthouse stairs. Hearing the gunshots, Olinger assumed that Bell had killed the Kid and started back across the street to investigate. Meanwhile, the Kid had secured Olinger's shotgun, which he had left leaning against the wall and positioned himself in a second-floor window where he would see Olinger return. When Olinger was almost under him, the Kid was reported to have said "Hello Bob!" before shooting him with both barrels of ten-gauge buckshot. Olinger was struck in the breast and died instantly.

Earlier in the day, Olinger had loaded the death weapon in front of the Kid, and said menacingly, "The man that gets one of those loads will feel it." "I expect he will," replied Billy, "but be careful, Bob, or you might shoot yourself accidentally."

He is buried in an unmarked grave at Fort Stanton Cemetery, New Mexico.

== Controversy ==
Despite his service as a deputy, Olinger has been widely denounced as a "bully with a badge" and a serial murderer. Most notably, fellow deputy Pierce Jones brought charges against Olinger for shooting an unarmed Bob Jones in the back while serving a small civil fine. The charges were dismissed, but Olinger's reputation as a bully has persisted.
