= Roscoe "Rustling Bob" Bryant =

American outlaw

Roscoe Bryant
- Died: September 1878; Seven Rivers, New Mexico
- Occupation: Outlaw
- Organizations: John Kinney Gang; Lincoln County Regulators; Selman's Scouts

Roscoe "Rustling Bob" Bryant (died September 1878) was a member of the John Kinney Gang during New Mexico's Lincoln County War. He was killed by members of Selman's Scouts near Seven Rivers, New Mexico in September 1878.

Lincoln County Regulators were preparing an assault on the Chisums, and alongside forty men, including Roscoe Bryant, all fought at the Chisum War. On 18 August they rode up to the Feliz and helped themselves to Tunstall's cattle.

He participated in the Five Day Siege of the McSween house and was later involved with John Selman's cattle rustling operation.

His body was found near Reese Gobly and James Irvin, presumably murdered by their fellows.
