= Brass Target =

1978 American war film by John Hough

- Theatrical release poster
- Directed by: John Hough
- Screenplay by: Alvin Boretz
- Based on: The Algonquin Project; 1974 novel by Frederick Nolan
- Produced by: Berle Adams; Arthur Lewis
- Starring: Sophia Loren; John Cassavetes; George Kennedy; Robert Vaughn; Patrick McGoohan; Bruce Davison; Edward Herrmann; Max von Sydow
- Cinematography: Tony Imi
- Edited by: David Lane
- Music by: Laurence Rosenthal
- Color process: Metrocolor
- Production company: Metro Goldwyn Mayer
- Distributed by: United Artists
- Release date: December 22, 1978
- Running time: 111 minutes
- Country: United States
- Language: English
- Box office: $5,111,000 (domestic) or $2.5 million (US rentals)

Brass Target is a 1978 American suspense war film based on the 1974 novel The Algonquin Project by Frederick Nolan. The film was produced by Berle Adams and Arthur Lewis and directed by John Hough. It stars Sophia Loren, John Cassavetes, Robert Vaughn, George Kennedy, Patrick McGoohan and Max von Sydow.

The film's plot concerns General George S. Patton's fatal automobile crash and suggests that the crash was not an accident but the result of a conspiracy.

== Plot ==
In Europe, days after V-E Day, General Patton orders that hoarded Nazi gold be transported to the Reichsbank in Frankfurt. But before the shipment arrives in the city, the gold train is robbed and 59 U.S. Army military policemen are killed with poison gas in a railroad tunnel. A group of corrupt American officers, led by a colonel, is behind the crime. Patton launches an investigation that initially leads to OSS major Joe De Lucca, from whom the thieves took a plan from his wartime operations to steal the gold.

De Lucca begins his own investigation. He first visits his old wartime commander, Colonel Mike McCauley, who is now living in a requisitioned German castle. Meanwhile, as the investigation gets closer, the corrupt American officers hire a professional assassin named Webber to kill Patton and halt the inquiry.

Soon De Lucca meets Mara, a former girlfriend, who can help him find the culprits. But they first discover that Webber is on their trail and is also planning to kill Patton. They race against time across war-ravaged Europe to save the general and catch the villainous officers.

Webber, posing as an American soldier, kills General Patton in a staged traffic accident. At the precise moment when a military truck collides with Patton's car, Webber fires a rubber bullet, striking Patton and breaking his neck. De Lucca tracks down the assassin and kills him with his own weapon.

== Cast ==
- Sophia Loren as Mara
- John Cassavetes as Major Joe De Lucca
- George Kennedy as General George S. Patton
- Robert Vaughn as Colonel Donald Rogers
- Patrick McGoohan as Colonel Mike McCauley
- Bruce Davison as Colonel Robert Dawson
- Edward Herrmann as Colonel Walter Gilchrist
- Max von Sydow as Professional Assassin Shelley Martin Webber
- Ed Bishop as Colonel Frank Stewart
- Lee Montague as Lucky Luciano
- Hal Galili as Captain Levy
- Bernard Horsfall as Shelley
- John Junkin as Carberry
- Sigfrit Steiner as Herr Schroeder
- Reinhold Olszewski as General Ostranov
- Bob Cunningham as General Stackwood
- Heinz Bennent as Kasten
- Brad Harris as Lt. Rowan
- Claudia Butenuth as Hilde
- Yulian Panich as Russian Officer

== Production ==
=== Development ===
The film is based on the 1974 historical novel The Algonquin Project by British writer Frederick W. Nolan in which a fictional protagonist tries to stop the assassination of Patton in a staged car accident. For more than thirty years, the death of Patton had been regarded as an unfortunate accident; however, it was noted at the time that the release of this 1978 film had created fresh speculation and dubious interest into the general's death. MGM was accused of hyping the conspiracy theory in order to market the film. Numerous books have since been published on the subject culminating in the "sensationalist" but "widely read" 2008 best-seller Target: Patton, The Plot to Assassinate General George S. Patton.

Although approximately $2.5 billion in German gold, most of which is still missing, was determined to have been pilfered in several separate thefts, no train robbery occurred as depicted in the film. Brass Target, despite a lukewarm reception upon its release, is noted for its attention to historical detail in an early post-war Europe. The Cold War had not started but relations with the Russians are shown to have already become frosty.

=== Casting ===
Many American soldiers from the 66th MI Group who were stationed in Munich appear as extras in the film.

=== Filming ===
Brass Target was shot on location in Munich, Bavaria, West Germany and Switzerland.

== Release ==
Brass Target was released in theaters on December 22, 1978 in the United States and March 2, 1979 in the United Kingdom.

The film was released on DVD on August 30, 2012 by the Warner Archive Collection. MGM Home Entertainment (under license from WB) released Brass Target on DVD as part of its Sophia Loren Collection.

== Reception ==
Vincent Canby of The New York Times wrote in his review: "It is the dubious premise of The Brass Target, a film full of dubiety, that Gen. George S. Patton was assassinated in Germany in 1945 by a motley crew of United States Army officers in an attempt to hide their theft of $250 million in Nazi gold. History says that General Patton died in Germany in 1945 following an automobile accident, but Frederick Nolan, who wrote The Algonquin Project, this film's source material, has connected various unsolved mysteries to make a wobbly case for his conspiracy theory. As historical speculation goes, it's less interesting than wondering where we might be today if Ford's Theater had been playing Uncle Tom's Cabin that fateful night in 1865, instead of Our American Cousin. Would Lincoln have attended, or might he have said, "Mary, I just can't sit through it again"? You may elect not to sit through international claptrap like this film, which doesn't measure up even to The Cassandra Crossing ... The Brass Target, which has been rated PG ("Parental Guidance Suggested"), contains a lot of violence, all of it simulated but random in the way of simple-minded movie-making."
