= Sudden =

Fictional character created by English author Oliver Strange

James Green aka "Sudden" is a fictional character created by an English author, Oliver Strange, in the early 1930s as the hero of a series, originally published by George Newnes Books Ltd, set in the American Wild West era. Oliver Strange died in 1952, and the series was revived by Frederick H. Christian in the 1960s. Christian classified the books as "Piccadilly westerns", that is, books written by English authors, simply drawing on the conventions of the genre, with no first-hand experience of America. Sudden is portrayed as an intrepid and accurate gunfighter in search of two men who cheated his foster father. James Green earns the nickname "Sudden" because of his lightning speed with a gun. Sudden is portrayed as a stereotypical gunfighter: an intelligent and resourceful drifting cowboy who is respectful of the law, unwilling to use a gun unless absolutely necessary, humanitarian, brave, strong, and fair. The first book was published in 1930 and was followed by 10 more until the 1940s and featured vivid descriptions of the western American landscape, rare in an author at that time. The series became popular for its exciting narrations combining elements of mystery, suspense, and action, with engaging characters, in a Wild West setting of dusty towns, ranches, and saloons.

== Plot ==
Sudden's background story is not explicitly detailed, but it is mentioned several times that, as a young man, he promises his dying foster father that he will find the two men who cheated him and take revenge. In Sudden—Outlawed, which goes back to the beginning of his story, he has returned to Texas from an Eastern education, but sets out on his quest for revenge on the death of his foster parent, using the name James Green. Almost at once, he himself is wrongly accused of murder and robbery and becomes an outlaw. In Sudden (1933), he is approached by the Governor of Arizona, Bleke, who, after a brief interview in the small New Mexico Town of Juniper, appointed Green a United States Deputy Sheriff, and subsequently sent on (typically undercover) missions to maintain law and order. In The Range Robbers, in fact the first book to be written, his story is resolved. He is revealed to be Donald Peterson, son of one of the men he has been hunting, and he marries Noreen, who turns out to be the abducted daughter of his foster father. The other object of his search is the villain of this story, whom Sudden exposes and kills.

The second story to be written, The Law o' the Lariat, follows on from The Range Robbers. In it Sudden, this time calling himself Jim Severn, has temporarily left his wife and family to go and help another rancher. However, the original situation outlined in The Range Robbers, of a once-outlaw turned undercover lawman, forced to move from place to place on his own quest for vengeance, provided a framework for any number of more or less self-contained stories, and Strange devoted the rest of the series to these earlier adventures.

The stories in the series follow very conventional and repetitive plot lines. A plot line typically revolves around Sudden arriving in a town that either has several unlawful elements or recent conflicts and mysterious deaths. Sudden earns the respect of the townspeople, fights against all odds, defeats the villains, protects the wronged, and then rides out into the sunset to continue his search.

Many events are repeated in all the stories, for example, fist fights in which the cowboy faces a bigger adversary without using any weapons, and emerges victorious; gun fights describing Sudden's lightning speed; and kidnapping-cum-rescue-cum-chase sequences as the climax. Often he acts as a detective, piecing together clues, and revealing the villain in a well-attended denouement, leading to a violent resolution. Further, in every book, Sudden befriends a young man who acts as a capable sidekick, and this young friend falls in love and inevitably wins the hand of the girl he loves; the only exception is The Range Robbers where the romantic involvement is that of Sudden himself and Noreen. One of the young men he befriends, however, reappears in more than one of the stories.

== After Oliver Strange ==
After Strange's death in 1952 the novels were still selling well, and an editor at Corgi Books in England had the idea of continuing the series, with the approval of Strange's family . Under the name of Frederick H. Christian he produced "modest little three-weeks-to-write westerns", which also sold successfully. Christian not only copied two novels with almost similar story lines, but also botched up the narrative in Sudden Strikes Back, where a bully tries to ride Sudden's horse and gets thrown down; the name of the girl who watches is given as "Noreen," Sudden's wife who he meets only much later in The Range Robbers (according to Oliver Strange) which describes an almost identical incident. Similarly, Sudden at Bay has strong resemblances to Sudden (1933). In Dead or Alive!, Christian makes Sudden a widower with references to Noreen clearly suggesting her death.

== Books ==
The Range Robbers was the first book published, but when Oliver Strange continued the series, he went back and forth with Sudden's history and so the publication order is not the same as the chronological order. All Sudden novels are out of print today.

Oliver Strange wrote 10 Sudden books –

- The Range Robbers (1930)
- The Law o' the Lariat (1931)
- Sudden (1933)
- The Marshal of Lawless (1933)
- Sudden—Outlawed (1934)
- Sudden—Gold Seeker (1937)
- Sudden Rides Again (1938)
- Sudden Takes the Trail (1940)
- Sudden Makes War (1942)
- Sudden Plays a Hand (1950)

Frederick H. Christian wrote 5 Sudden books –

- Sudden Strikes Back (1966)
- Sudden—Troubleshooter (1967)
- Sudden at Bay (1968)
- Sudden—Apache Fighter (1969)
- Sudden—Dead or Alive! (1970)
