= Stinking Springs =

Ranch in Taiban, New Mexico

Coordinates: 36.6508°N 108.7179°W

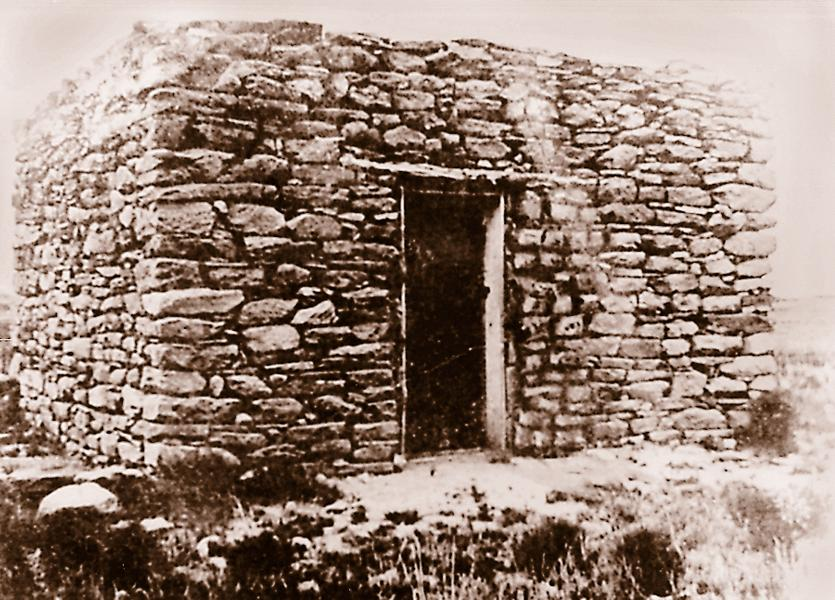
Stinking Springs rock house

Stinking Springs was a ranch and an overnight way station for cattle drivers and shepherds located near the present site of Taiban, New Mexico. On 23 December 1880 sheriff Pat Garrett and his posse found Billy the Kid and the Regulators in a stone hut, where it began a shoot-out which killed Charlie Bowdre and captured Billy, Dave Rudabaugh, Tom Pickett and Billy Wilson. Only the foundation remains nowadays.

The musical production The Lighter Side of Stinking Springs centers around the stonehouse. The song is simple and includes the reprisal of The Ballad of Stinking Springs.

== Bibliography ==
- Metz, Leon Claire (1 March 1983). Pat Garrett: The Story of a Western Lawman. University of Oklahoma Press. p. 328. ISBN 9780806118383.
