= John M. Larn =

American lawman and outlaw (1849–1878)

John Larn
- Born: March 1, 1849; Mobile, Alabama, U.S.
- Died: June 23, 1878 (aged 29); Albany, Texas
- Occupation(s): Lawman and cattle rustler
- Known for: Operated a cattle rustling ring with John Selman; second sheriff of Shackelford County, Texas

John M. Larn (March 1, 1849 – June 23, 1878) was a western American lawman and later outlaw who, with gunfighter John Selman, operated a cattle rustling ring in Shackelford County, Texas, for over a year.

== Life ==
Larn was born in Mobile, Alabama on March 1, 1849. He traveled to Colorado as a teenager where he found work as a ranch hand until murdering his employer during an argument over a horse. Fleeing to New Mexico, Larn killed a local sheriff he had thought was tracking him. After settling in Fort Griffin, Texas, Larn once again was employed by local rancher Bill Hays as a trail boss. It was also around this time, while traveling to California, that Larn had supposedly murdered two Mexicans after an argument and had their bodies dumped in the Pecos River.

Deciding to stay in Fort Griffin, Larn eventually married Mary Matthews, a younger sister of John Alexander Matthews and within several years had become a well known citizen of Shackelford County. After years of service with the local vigilante committees, Larn was elected county sheriff in April 1876. Shortly after becoming elected, Larn agreed to a contract with the local territorial garrison to deliver three steers of cattle per day. Larn however, began planning with longtime friend and recently deputized John Selman to rustle cattle from neighboring ranchers in place of his own. Suspicions were soon raised as ranchers noticed while their herds were slowly shrinking, Larn's remained the only ranch unaffected and, after discovering the scheme, Larn was eventually forced to resign on March 7, 1877.

No charges were brought against him however; Leslie continued to live in Shackelford County until June 1878 when Larn wounded a local rancher by the name of Treadwell (who had reportedly uncovered the cattle rustling). Larn was soon arrested by Sheriff William Cruger on June 22, 1878, and taken to Albany where Cruger ordered the local blacksmith to shackle Larn to the floor of the jail house as to prevent a breakout by Larn's supporters. However, when vigilantes from Fort Griffin arrived the following night, finding they could not lynch Larn they instead shot him as he was still shackled in his cell.

Police appointments
Preceded by Henry Carter Jacobs	Sheriff of Shackelford County, Texas; 1876–1877	Succeeded by William R. Cruger
