= Ben Wittick =

American photographer (1845–1903)

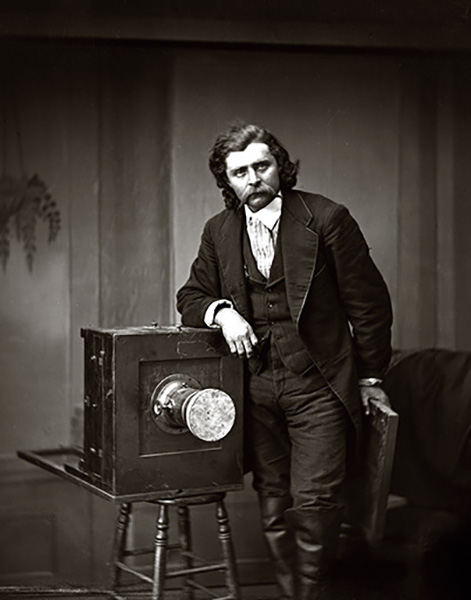
- Born: George Benjamin Wittick; January 1, 1845; Huntingdon, Pennsylvania
- Died: August 30, 1903 (aged 58); Fort Wingate, New Mexico
- Other name: Benjamin Wallace
- Occupation: Photographer
- Years active: 1870–1903
- Known for: Photography of the American frontier
- Notable work: Photograph of Geronimo (1887); Possibly photo of Billy the Kid (c. 1880)

Signature
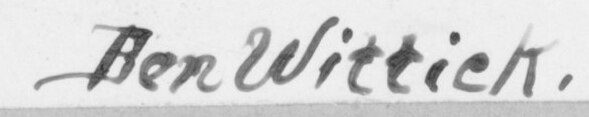

George Benjamin Wittick (January 1, 1845 – August 30, 1903) was an American photographer. He is known for his photos of the American frontier and of Native Americans.

He started his photography work in the town of Moline, Illinois, then traveled to the southwest. In 1900, he established his final studio at Fort Wingate, New Mexico.

== Biography ==
George Benjamin Wittick was born January 1, 1845 in Huntingdon, Pennsylvania to Conrad Wittick and Barbara Petrie who were German immigrants. Around 1854, he travelled westward with his parents, where they settled in the town of Moline, Illinois.

Wittick served in the American Civil War for the Union when he was 16, before being discharged in Minnesota in 1865. He married Frances “Fannie” Averill in 1866. Wittick had six children total. In his hometown of Moline, he apprenticed in photography at a gallery operated by a Mr. Mangold. After 1870, he started some of his travels west, where he went on to photograph many landscapes, portraits and Native American tribes, including the Hopi, Navajo, Apache, and Zuni. In 1878, he arrived in New Mexico via the Atlantic and Pacific Railroad. Wittick is often attributed with taking the only authenticated photo of Billy the Kid c. 1880. In 1887, he photographed Geronimo kneeling with a rifle.

He died August 30, 1903, in Fort Wingate, New Mexico, after a rattlesnake bite from which he never recovered. He was bitten weeks prior, while handling the snake before he left Fort Wingate. His death was said to have been foretold by a Hopi medicine man. He was buried in Moline, Illinois in 1903.
