= Tom Pickett (outlaw) =

American cowboy, gambler, lawman and outlaw

- Born: 1858; Clarksville, Red River, Texas, US
- Died: May 14, 1934 (aged 75–76); Winslow, Arizona, US
- Occupations: Cowboy, cattle rustler, professional gambler, lawman, bartender, prospector, cowhand, stage driver
- Spouse: Catherine Kelly

Tom Pickett (1858 – May 14, 1934) was a 19th-century American cowboy, professional gambler and, as both a lawman and outlaw at various points in his life, was an associate of Dave Rudabaugh and later Billy the Kid.

== Biography ==
Born in Clarksville, Red River County, Texas, Pickett began rustling cattle as a teenager growing up in Decatur and was eventually arrested for stealing cattle at age 17. His father, then a member of the state legislature and ex-Confederate officer, was forced to mortgage the family home in order to pay his son's fine.

While in Kansas City, he would meet outlaw Dave Rudabaugh and traveled with him to the New Mexico Territory after being indicted in Cooke County for cattle rustling in 1879. He served as a peace officer for the Dodge City Gang in Las Vegas until the two were run out of town after Rudabaugh killed a deputy sheriff.

He later had a brief stint as town marshal of Golden, New Mexico. However, he was later run out of town by a lynch mob in 1882. Living in Mexico for a time, he was one of several men who were charged with the murders of four Mexicans at Seven Rivers, New Mexico on January 8, 1884, although he managed to avoid arrest.

He settled in Holbrook, Arizona and, in 1888, married Catherine Kelly. After his wife and baby died in childbirth the following year, he returned to drifting, working at various times as a bartender, prospector and cowhand, and was a stage driver for the Fort Apache–Holbrook line for several years. Between 1912 and 1914, he was also a deputy U.S. Marshal.

He eventually had to have his right leg amputated, and he returned to northern Arizona to live out his final years where he was appointed a deputy U.S. marshal, although he resigned on May 16, 1922. He died of nephritis at the age of 76 in Winslow, Arizona on May 14, 1934.

== Bibliography ==
- Neal, Bill. Encyclopedia of Western Gunfighters. Norman: University of Oklahoma Press, 1991. ISBN 0-8061-2335-4
- Philip J. Rasch, "He Rode With the Kid: The Life of Tom Pickett." London. English Westerners' 10th Anniv. Pubn., 1964.
- Roth, Mitchel P. Historical Dictionary of Law Enforcement. Westport, Connecticut: Greenwood Publishing Group, 2001. ISBN 0-313-30560-9
