= John Selman =

El Paso Texas lawman and Old West outlaw (1839–1896)

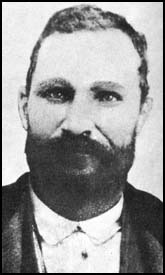
- Born: John Henry Selman Sr. November 16, 1839; Madison County, Arkansas, U.S.
- Died: April 5, 1896 (aged 56); El Paso, Texas, U.S.
- Cause of death: Gunshot wound
- Occupations: Lawman and outlaw
- Spouse(s): Edna Degraffenreid (1865-1879); Romula Granadine (1893-1896)

John Henry Selman (November 16, 1839 – April 5, 1896) was sometimes identified as an outlaw and sometimes a working lawman of the Old West. He is best known as the man who fatally shot John Wesley Hardin in the Acme Saloon in El Paso, Texas, on August 19, 1895.

== Early life, service with the Confederacy ==
John Henry Selman was born in Madison County, Arkansas. He was the son of Jeremiah Selman. The Selman family moved to Grayson County, Texas, in 1858.

After his father's death on December 16, 1861, Selman joined the 22nd Texas Cavalry and served during the Civil War.

On August 17, 1865, Selman married Edna Degraffenreid. The couple had four children. He and his family eventually moved to Fort Griffin in Shackelford County, Texas.

== Life as a lawman ==
In 1877, Selman became a deputy inspector for hides, working under fellow inspector, ex-Shackleford County sheriff, John M. Larn.

Selman and Larn fought against rustlers and vigilante justice in the lawless area of northwest Texas. The two were involved in several shootouts with bandits and outlaws during the period that followed. Then, on June 24, 1878, vigilantes shot Larn to death in an Albany, Texas, jail cell.

Larn had been arrested after six hides, which did not belong to him, had been found behind his house. Even though Selman was out of town at the time, he was implicated in the theft. Hunted by the very same vigilantes who had had run-ins with him in the past, Selman had become a wanted man.

== Life as an outlaw ==
Selman went into hiding during this time, as he was also facing charges stemming from his desertion from the Confederate Army. Selman went to Mexico. However, the end of the war and the resulting dissolution of the Confederacy rendered any prior charges null, and Selman was free to return to the United States.

Selman's wife died in 1879, while giving birth to a stillborn child. The other four children were placed in the custody of his wife's niece. Selman by this time was living in Lincoln County, New Mexico.

This was during the Lincoln County War. He organized a band, "Selman's Scouts" (known locally as "The Rustlers"). The group was accused of numerous acts of rape and murder in the area. However, no charges were ever filed against him there.

Roscoe "Rustling Bob" Bryant was involved with John Selman's cattle rustling operation. As a member of "Selman's Scouts", Bryant was killed by his members near Seven Rivers, New Mexico in September, 1878. His body was found near the corpses of Reese Gobly and James Irvin.

By 1880, the band had been driven from Lincoln County, and began operating in Jeff Davis County, Texas. Selman was captured shortly thereafter by Texas Ranger Joe McKidrict, and taken to Shackelford County for trial.

== Escape and return to law enforcement ==
Selman escaped, and fled again to Chihuahua, Mexico, where he hid out until around 1888, when his name was cleared and all charges against him were dropped.

While in Mexico, he sent for his children. The two youngest boys joined their father, but the two oldest remained in Brown County, Texas – never to see their father again. He then moved to El Paso, Texas, and on August 23, 1893, he married Romula Granadine. He began working as a constable, and spent time gambling.

On April 5, 1894, Selman killed a former Texas Ranger named Bass Outlaw. Outlaw had recently been fired, due to his drinking and the threats he had made against a judge. Selman, encountering an inebriated Outlaw, had suggested that Outlaw needed to go home and sleep it off. When Outlaw declined to go home, however, the two instead walked to "Tillie Howard's", a local brothel favored by Outlaw. Outlaw created a disturbance at Howard's place, resulting in his fatal shooting of Texas Ranger Joe McKidrict. He also drew on Selman, who was shot and wounded twice in the thigh. Selman returned fire and killed Outlaw. Selman was not arrested for the shooting, which was ruled justified.

== The murder of John Wesley Hardin ==
El Paso policeman and Selman's son, John Jr., arrested the mistress of gunman John Wesley Hardin, Beulah M'rose (or "the widow M'Rose"), for "brandishing a gun in public." Hardin confronted the younger Selman about it and the two men had a verbal dispute.

In accounts supported by members of Selman's family Hardin pistol-whipped "Young John" Selman, and threatened his life. After hearing of the argument the elder Selman approached Hardin on the afternoon of August 19, 1895. The two exchanged angry words. That night Hardin went to the Acme Saloon and played dice. Shortly before midnight Selman walked into the saloon to confront Hardin. Drawing his gun at the door he walked up behind Hardin. He fired, shooting Hardin in the back of the head – supposedly as Hardin went for his gun – killing him instantly.

As Hardin lay on the floor, Selman fired three more shots into him. Selman was arrested, charged with murder and stood trial. He testified that he realised that Hardin had noticed him enter in the mirror and that Hardin had gone for his gun. Selman swore he fired in self-defense. A hung jury resulted in his release on bond, pending retrial.

== Death ==
On the night of April 5, 1896, Selman was killed in a shootout with US Marshal George Scarborough. Period newspaper accounts differ as to the exact nature of their bad blood; one account attributes it to an ongoing gambling dispute, while another states that Selman (who was tastefully described as having lived a "stormy life") had become an unpredictably violent drunk after the publicity and controversy of killing John Wesley Hardin. It was also widely speculated that Scarborough resented Selman's killing of his old friend Bass Outlaw; given that Outlaw's last act was to kill one of his own fellow Marshals (and seriously wound Selman) in a drunken frenzy at a whorehouse, this seems an unlikely grudge to hold.

Instead, especially considering Old John's dedication to his son, it is far more likely that Scarborough's testimony when tried for killing Selman was truthful, to wit: John Selman Jr. (known as "Young John") had fallen in love and eloped with a Mexican girl, whose father, an ambassador, disapproved. When they were found the father had the younger Selman jailed in Juarez. On the night of his death, Selman Sr., who was drinking with Scarborough, said he wanted to talk privately. According to Scarborough, they exited to the alley where Selman attempted to enlist him in a conspiracy to cross the border the next morning and stage a jail break to free Young John. Scarborough expressed sympathy but declined, stating "no bad breaks must be made in Juarez", whereupon Selman flew into a rage, exclaiming "You God damned son-of-a-bitch, I am going to kill you!" Selman drew first and Scarborough then shot him in self-defense. Selman died hours later.

When it was found that Selman's gun was not at the scene Scarborough was arrested for murder. Just before his trial, a thief, Cole Belmont, was arrested and it was then discovered that he had Selman's gun. The thief said he saw the shooting and stole the gun before the crowd arrived. Scarborough was acquitted and released.

== Notes ==
- : John Henry Selman; at FrontierTimes.com
- Selman Guest Ranch, Harper County, Oklahoma; selmanguestranch.com
