= Billy Wilson (outlaw) =

Old west outlaw and later lawman

David Lawrence Anderson (1862 – June 4, 1918) was a 19th-century American outlaw, better known under the alias Billy Wilson, who rode with Billy the Kid following the Lincoln County War. In his later years, he also served as a law enforcement officer and a U.S. customs inspector.

== Early years ==
Born in Trumbull County, Ohio, he moved with his family to southern Texas in the early 1870s. Working as a cowboy during his late teens, he moved to White Oaks, New Mexico in 1880 where he became the owner of a local livery stable. Closing his business the following year, he apparently received counterfeit money from the sale and was eventually indicted for passing the money in Lincoln County.

== Billy the Kid gang ==
Forced to go on the run, he joined Billy the Kid and his gang rustling cattle in the local area. From February to May 1880, Anderson stole horses from the Mescalero Apache reservation as well as cattle from ranchers on the Colorado River to whom they sold for $10 a head to White Oaks businessman Thomas Cooper. During the summer they also stole cattle from rancher John Newcomb and sold them along with an additional 20 beef cattle to butcher John Singer in Las Vegas, New Mexico.

On November 29, Anderson and Billy the Kid were traveling in the open country near White Oaks when they were suddenly pursued by a local 8-man posse. Both their horses were killed during the chase however they were both able to escape on foot. Later meeting up with Dave Rudabaugh, the three rode into White Oaks the following day and attempted to gun down deputy sheriff James Redman but were forced to flee after a crowd of 30 or 40 local residents took to the streets. He and the others were tracked to a ranch house 40 miles away by a 12-man posse but they managed to escape. During the shootout, deputy sheriff Jimmy Carlyle was killed and their pursuers burned the hideout in frustration following their escape.

Following the siege at Stinking Springs (near present-day Taiban, New Mexico), he was arrested with the rest of Billy the Kid's gang after surrendering to Pat Garrett and convicted in December 1880. Anderson later escaped from custody in Santa Fe and escaped to Texas where he lived under his birth name David L. Anderson.

== Texas years ==
Starting a ranch in Uvalde County, Texas, he eventually married and had two children. Thanks in part to the efforts of Pat Garrett and others, Anderson received a presidential pardon from President Grover Cleveland in 1896 and worked as a U.S. customs inspector for a time.

== Death of Anderson ==
Serving as sheriff of Terrell County, Anderson was eventually ambushed and killed by cowboy Ed Valentine when he responded to a call at a local saloon in Sanderson. Warned that the suspect was armed, the sheriff knew the man and did not consider him a threat. When he entered the saloon the cowboy shot him, killing him instantly. Later the suspect was shot and killed by a deputy when he stepped outside the building. Sheriff Anderson was well liked by the public, and was buried in Brackettville, Texas, after a very emotional funeral at which many Sanderson citizens were in attendance.

== See also ==
- List of people pardoned or granted clemency by the president of the United States

Police appointments
Preceded by J.J. Allen	Sheriff of Terrell County, Texas; July 7, 1915–June 4, 1918	Succeeded by John Nichols
