= Frederick Nolan (writer) =

English editor and writer (1931–2022)

- Born: Frederick William Nolan; 7 March 1931; Liverpool, England
- Died: 15 June 2022 (aged 91); Chalfont St. Giles, England
- Other names: Donald Severn; Daniel Rockfern; Christine McGuire; Frederick H. Christian
- Occupations: Editor and writer

Frederick William Nolan (7 March 1931 – 15 June 2022) was an English editor and writer, mostly known as Frederick Nolan; he also used the pen names Donald Severn, Daniel Rockfern, Christine McGuire, and Frederick H. Christian.

== Early life and education ==
Nolan was born on 7 March 1931 in Liverpool, England, where he was educated, as well as in Aberaeron in Wales.

== Career ==
At the age of 21, Nolan began the research that established him as one of England's leading authorities on the American West. In 1954, he co-founded The English Westerners' Society.

At the start of his career, Nolan became first a reader, and later an editor, for Corgi (Bantam) Books in London. Moving to London in the early 1960s made it possible for him to pursue the other consuming interest of his life: American musical theatre. During this time, he also began writing Western fiction as Frederick H. Christian, a pseudonym derived from his own, his wife Heidi's, and his oldest son's first names.

Over the next decade, while working in publishing – with Transworld, then Penguin, Collins, and Granada in London, and later with Ballantine and Warner in New York – he produced fourteen Westerns as well as a considerable body of journalism.

On 4 July 1973, Nolan quit his job as a highly paid publishing executive and signed a contract to write eight full-length novels in a year. The first of these was The Oshawa Project (published in the U.S. as The Algonquin Project), which MGM later filmed as Brass Target (1978). Since that time, Nolan completed more than seventy books, a similar number of biographical studies, and articles for historical journals.

One of the foremost authorities on the life and times of American outlaw Billy the Kid, and the history of the American West in general, Nolan appeared frequently in television documentaries dealing with the subject, as well as lecturing to historical societies in the U.K. and U.S., and on cruise ships.

His Westerns include the Angel series of books as well as five additional books in the Sudden series created by Oliver Strange. These have latterly been reissued under new titles, while the Angel series now appears under the pseudonym Daniel Rockfern (which is an anagram of "Frederick Nolan").

== Personal life ==
Nolan died in Chalfont St. Giles, don 15 June 2022, at the age of 91.

== Honorable recognitions ==
In 1993, Nolan received the Border Regional Library Association of Texas Award for Literary Excellence. In 2001, he was awarded the first France V. Scholes Prize for outstanding research from the Historical Society of New Mexico. The same year, he received the first J. Evetts Haley Fellowship from the Haley Memorial Library in Midland, Texas. In 2005, the Western Outlaw-Lawman History Association (WOLA) gave him its highest honour, the Glenn Shirley Award, for his lifetime contribution to outlaw-lawman history. In 2006, The Westerners Foundation named his The West of Billy the Kid one of the 100 most important 20th-century historical works on the American West. In 2007, the National Outlaw-Lawman Association (NOLA) awarded him its William D. Reynolds Award in Recognition of Outstanding Research and Writing in Western History. A year later, True West Magazine named him "Best Living Non-fiction Writer".

== Selected bibliography ==
=== Novels ===
- The Oshawa Project (1974; published in the U.S. as The Algonquin Project, 1975; a bestseller on both sides of the Atlantic, filmed as Brass Target in 1978)
- No Place to Be a Cop (1974)
- The Mittenwald Syndicate (1976; another best-selling thriller about the Reichsbank robbery in Germany at the end of World War II)
- Carver's Kingdom (1980; historical novel about the building of the American Transcontinental railroad)
- White Nights, Red Dawn (1980; historical novel set amid the turmoil of the Russian Revolution)
- A Promise of Glory (1983; historical novel about an American family during the Revolution)
- Blind Duty (1983; historical novel about the same family during the American Civil War)
- Field of Honour (1985; historical novel about a family during the Spanish–American War)
- Wolf Trap (1983; thriller about the 1942 assassination of Reinhard Heydrich in Prague)
- Red Centre (1987; a hi-tech espionage thriller)

Garrett Dossier:

- Sweet Sister Death (1989; a prescient thriller featuring a terrorist strike in New York)
- Alert State Black (1989; Charles Garrett fights terrorism in Germany)
- Designated Assassin (1990; this time the terrorists are Irish)
- Rat Run (1991; Garrett combats a group planning the biggest ecological disaster ever)

=== As Christine McGuire ===
- Until Proven Guilty (1993)
- Until Justice Is Done (1995)
- Until Death Do Us Part (1997)

=== As Frederick H. Christian ===
- Sudden Strikes Back (1966)
- Sudden at Bay (1968)
- Sudden, Apache Fighter (1969)
- Sudden – Troubleshooter (1967)
- Sudden, Dead or Alive! (1970)

=== As Daniel Rockfern ===
- Standoff at Liberty
- Ride Out to Vengeance
- Ambush in Purgatory
- Long Ride into Hell
- Ride Clear of Daranga
- Bad Day at Agua Caliente
- Massacre in Madison
- Showdown at Trinidad
- Shootout at Fischer's Crossing
- Manhunt in Quemado
- Duel at Cheyenne

=== Non-fiction works ===
- The Life and Death of John Henry Tunstall (2009)
- Rodgers & Hammerstein: The Sound of Their Music (2002)
- The Lincoln County War: A Documentary History (2009)
- Bad Blood: The Life and Times of the Horrel Brothers
- Portraits of the Old West (1997)
- Lorenz Hart: A Poet on Broadway (1995)
- The West of Billy the Kid (1998)
- Pat Garrett's The Authentic Life of Billy, the Kid (editor)
- The Wild West: History, Myth and the Making of America (2003)
- Tascosa, Its Life and Gaudy Times (2007)
- The Billy the Kid Reader (editor; 2007)
- Deep Trails in the Old West (editor)

=== Translated from French ===
- Lucky Luke: Jesse James
- Lucky Luke: The Stage Coach
- Lucky Luke: The Dashing White Cowboy

(and 15 other titles in the series)
