= John Kinney Gang =

19th-century American criminal gang

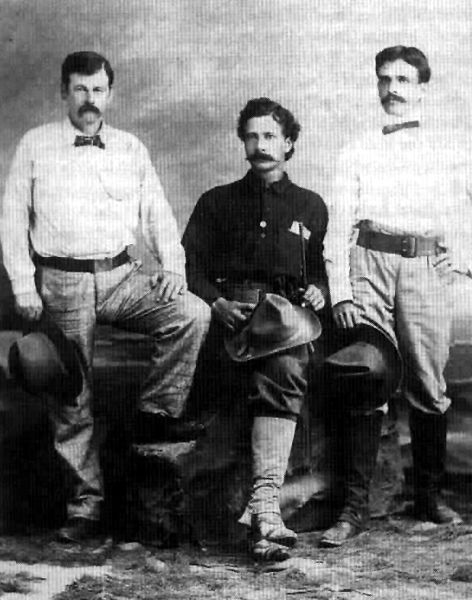
- John Kinney Gang members with John Kinney at left side
- Founded: 1880s
- Founder: John Kinney
- Founding location: Doña Ana County, New Mexico
- Years active: December 31, 1875 – 1883
- Membership: 17
- Activities: Robbery and cattle rustling

The John Kinney Gang, also known as the Rio Grande Posse, was an outlaw gang of the Old West which operated during the mid-1870s into the mid-1880s.

The gang was organized by outlaw John Kinney, in Doña Ana County, New Mexico. From its beginning, the gang primarily committed acts of robbery and cattle rustling. On December 31, 1875, the gang was involved in a gunfight with US Cavalry soldiers in a saloon in Las Cruces, New Mexico. According to different accounts, they killed one or two soldiers and a civilian outright and wounded three soldiers

They became best known when they were enlisted by the "Murphy-Dolan Faction" during the Lincoln County War, to counter Billy the Kid and his "Regulators". Former gang member Jesse Evans and his gang were also enlisted by "Murphy-Dolan". Lincoln County Sheriff George Peppin deputized the gang members to make them "official" during this time.

After the Lincoln County War ended, they resumed their previous criminal activities, with some members remaining with the Kinney Gang, while others joined the Jesse Evans Gang or John Selman's gang.

The Kinney Gang disbanded when John Kinney was arrested in 1883 for rustling. He was released from prison in 1886, but by that time all former gang members had either disappeared, were in prison or dead. John Kinney did not return to his former outlaw life, instead serving in the US Army during the Spanish–American War, and lived until 1919.

== Known members ==
- John Kinney (leader)
- Jim Wallace
- R. L. Bryan
- John Chambers
- Caleb Hall
- Edward Hart
- James Hurley
- John W. Irving
- George A. Rose
- John Y. Thorton
- Ben Waters
- Roscoe "Rustling Bob" Bryant
- Jim McIntire
- Jesse Evans
- Jim McDaniels
- Charles Ray aka Pony Diehl
- Doroteo Saenz

== See also ==
- Outlaws of the American Old West
