= Billy the Kid =

American outlaw and gunfighter (1859–1881)

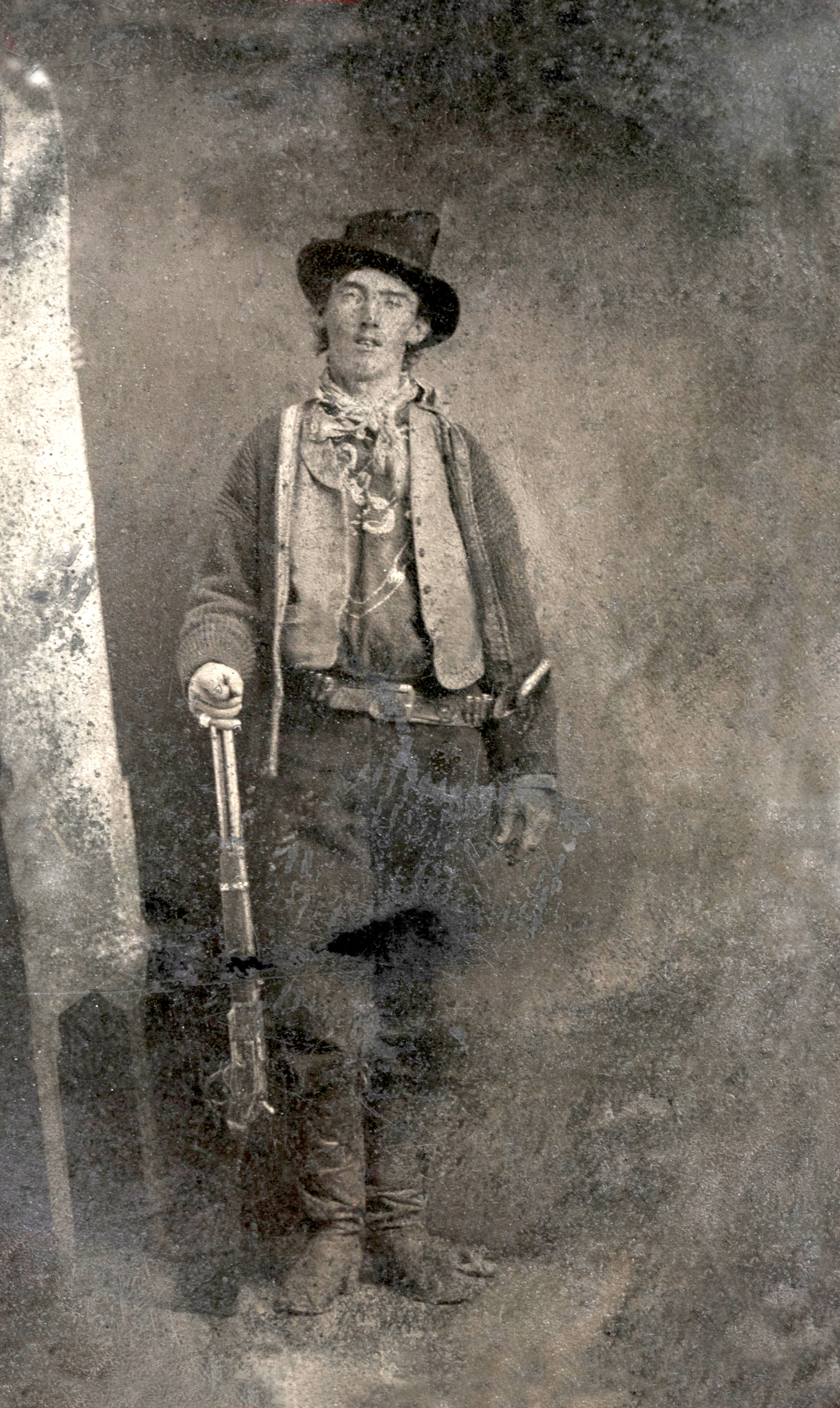
- Portrait attributed to Ben Wittick, c. 1880
- Born: Henry McCarty; September 17 or November 23, 1859; New York City, U.S.
- Died: July 14, 1881 (aged 21); Fort Sumner, New Mexico, U.S.
- Cause of death: Gunshot wound
- Resting place: Old Fort Sumner Cemetery; 34°24′13″N 104°11′37″W
- Other names: William H. Bonney; Henry Antrim; Kid Antrim
- Occupations: Cattle rustler; cowboy and ranch hand; gambler; horse thief; outlaw

Henry McCarty (September 17 or November 23, 1859 – July 14, 1881), alias William H. Bonney, better known as Billy the Kid, was an American outlaw and gunfighter of the Old West who was linked to nine murders. He was solely responsible for four of them, and he may have played a role in five, alongside other men. He is also noted for his involvement in New Mexico's Lincoln County War.

McCarty was orphaned at the age of 15. His first arrest was for stealing food at the age of 16 in 1875. Ten days later, he robbed a Chinese laundry and was arrested again, but escaped shortly afterwards. He fled from New Mexico Territory into neighboring Arizona Territory, making himself both an outlaw and a federal fugitive. In 1877, he began to call himself "William H. Bonney".

After killing a blacksmith during an altercation in August 1877, Bonney became a wanted man in Arizona and returned to New Mexico, where he joined a group of cattle rustlers. He became well known in the region when he joined the Regulators and took part in the Lincoln County War of 1878. He and two other Regulators were later charged with killing three men, including Lincoln County Sheriff William J. Brady and one of his deputies.

Bonney's notoriety grew in December 1880 when the Las Vegas Gazette, in Las Vegas, New Mexico, and The Sun, in New York City, carried stories about his crimes. Sheriff Pat Garrett captured Bonney later that month. In April 1881, Bonney was tried for and convicted of Brady's murder and was sentenced to hang in May of that year. He escaped from jail on April 28, killing two sheriff's deputies in the process, and evaded capture for more than two months. Garrett shot and killed Bonney, by then aged 21, in Fort Sumner on July 14, 1881. During his short career as an outlaw, Bonney was the subject of numerous U.S. newspaper articles, some as far away as New York.

During the decades following his death, stories spread that Bonney had survived, and a number of men claimed to be him. The legend of Billy the Kid endures in American culture, and he remains one of the most notorious figures from the era, whose life and likeness have been frequently dramatized in the Western genre. More than 50 films and several broadcast programs have featured Billy the Kid.

== Early life ==
Henry McCarty was born to parents of Irish Catholic ancestry, Catherine (née Devine) and Patrick McCarty, in New York City. While his birth year has been confirmed as 1859, the exact date of his birth has been disputed as either September 17 or November 23 of that year. There is uncertainty among historians about the exact place and date of McCarty's birth. Census records indicate that his younger brother Joseph McCarty was born in 1863.

Following her husband's death, Catherine McCarty and her sons moved to Indianapolis, Indiana, where she met William Henry Harrison Antrim. The McCarty family moved with Antrim to Wichita, Kansas in 1870. After moving again a few years later, Catherine married Antrim on March 1, 1873, at the First Presbyterian Church in Santa Fe, New Mexico Territory, and the McCarty boys served as witnesses. Shortly afterward, the family moved from Santa Fe to Silver City, New Mexico and Joseph adopted Antrim's surname. Shortly before McCarty's mother died of tuberculosis on September 16, 1874, William Antrim abandoned the McCarty boys, leaving them orphans.

=== First crimes ===
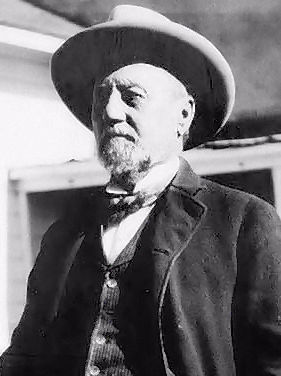
Henry Hooker, one-time employer of Billy the Kid, at his Sierra Bonita Ranch in southeast Arizona

McCarty was 14 years old when his mother died. Sarah Brown, the owner of a boarding house, gave him room and board in exchange for work. On September 16, 1875, McCarty was caught stealing food. Ten days later, McCarty and George Schaefer robbed a Chinese laundry, stealing clothing and two pistols. McCarty was charged with theft and was jailed. He escaped two days later and became a fugitive, as reported in the Silver City Herald the next day, the first story published about him. McCarty located his stepfather and stayed with him until Antrim threw him out; McCarty stole clothing and guns from him. It was the last time the two met.

After leaving Antrim, McCarty traveled to southeastern Arizona Territory, where he worked as a ranch hand and gambled his wages in nearby gaming houses. In 1876, he was hired as a ranch hand by well-known rancher Henry Hooker. During this time, McCarty became acquainted with John R. Mackie, a Scottish-born criminal and former U.S. Cavalry private who, following his discharge, remained near the U.S. Army post at Camp Grant in Arizona. The two men soon began stealing horses from local soldiers. McCarty became known as "Kid Antrim" because of his youth, slight build, clean-shaven appearance, and personality.

At some point in 1877, McCarty began referring to himself as "William H. Bonney". His birth name of McCarty was unknown by the public, and remained obscured even to researchers until it was uncovered by historian Robert N. Mullin in the mid 20th century.

On August 17, 1877, Bonney was at a saloon in the village of Bonita when he got into an argument with Francis P. "Windy" Cahill, a blacksmith who reportedly had bullied him and on more than one occasion called him a "pimp". Bonney, in turn, called Cahill a "son of a bitch", whereupon Cahill threw him to the floor, and the two struggled for Bonney's revolver. Bonney shot and mortally wounded Cahill. A witness said, "[Billy] had no choice; he had to use his equalizer." Cahill died the following day. Bonney fled but returned a few days later and was apprehended by Miles Wood, the local justice of the peace. He was detained and held in the Camp Grant guardhouse, but escaped before law enforcement could arrive.

Bonney stole a horse and fled Arizona Territory for New Mexico Territory, but Apaches took the horse from him, leaving him to walk many miles to the nearest settlement. At Fort Stanton, starving and near death, he went to the home of a friend and Seven Rivers Warriors gang member John Jones, whose mother Barbara nursed him back to health. After regaining his health, Bonney went to Apache Tejo, a former army post, where he joined a band of rustlers who raided herds owned by cattle magnate John Chisum in Lincoln County. After he was spotted in Silver City, his involvement with the gang was mentioned in a local newspaper.

== Lincoln County War ==
=== Prelude ===
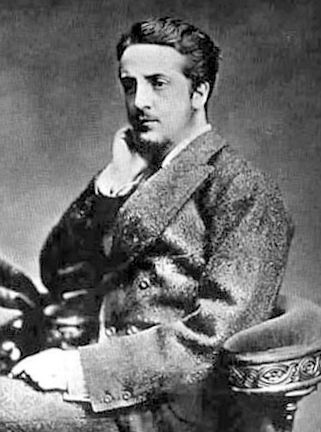
John Henry Tunstall, 1872

After returning to New Mexico, Bonney worked as a cowboy for English businessman and rancher John Henry Tunstall (1853–1878), near the Rio Felix, a tributary of the Pecos River, in Lincoln County (now in Chaves County). Tunstall and his business partner and lawyer Alexander McSween were opponents of an alliance formed by Irish-American businessmen Lawrence Murphy, James Dolan, and John Riley. The three men had wielded an economic and political hold over Lincoln County since the early 1870s, due in part to their ownership of a beef contract with nearby Fort Stanton and a well-patronized dry goods store in the town of Lincoln.

By February 1878, McSween owed $8,000 to Dolan, who obtained a court order and asked Lincoln County Sheriff William J. Brady to attach nearly $40,000 worth of Tunstall's property and livestock. Tunstall put Bonney in charge of nine prime horses and told him to relocate them to his ranch for safekeeping. Meanwhile, Sheriff Brady assembled a large posse to seize Tunstall's cattle.

On February 18, 1878, Tunstall learned of the posse's presence on his land and rode out to intervene. During the encounter, one member of the posse shot Tunstall in the chest, knocking him off his horse. Another posse member took Tunstall's gun and killed him with a shot to the back of his head. Tunstall's murder ignited the conflict between the two factions that became known as the Lincoln County War.

=== Build-up ===
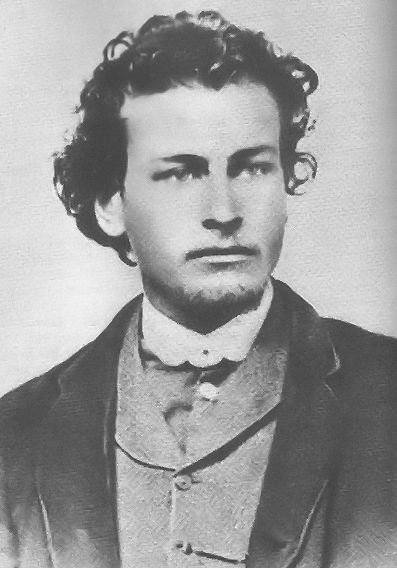
Dick Brewer, c. 1875

After Tunstall was killed, Bonney and Dick Brewer swore affidavits against Brady and those in his posse, and obtained murder warrants from Lincoln County justice of the peace John B. Wilson. On February 20, 1878, while attempting to arrest Brady, the sheriff and his deputies found and arrested Bonney and two other men riding with him. Deputy U.S. Marshal Robert Widenmann, a friend of Bonney, and a detachment of soldiers captured Sheriff Brady's jail guards, put them behind bars, and released Bonney and Brewer.

Bonney then joined the Lincoln County Regulators; on March 9, they captured Frank Baker and William Morton, both of whom were accused of killing Tunstall. Baker and Morton were killed while allegedly trying to escape.

On April 1, the Regulators ambushed Sheriff Brady and his deputies; Bonney was wounded in the thigh during the battle. Brady and Deputy Sheriff George W. Hindman were killed. On the morning of April 4, 1878, Buckshot Roberts and Dick Brewer were killed during a shootout at Blazer's Mill. Warrants were issued for several participants on both sides, and Bonney and two others were charged with killing Brady, Hindman, and Roberts.

==== Battle of Lincoln (1878) ====
On the night of Sunday, July 14, McSween and the Regulators—now a group of fifty or sixty men—went to Lincoln and stationed themselves in the town among several buildings. At the McSween residence were Bonney, Florencio Chavez, Jose Chavez y Chavez, Jim French, Harvey Morris, Tom O'Folliard, and Yginio Salazar, among others. Another group led by Marin Chavez and Doc Scurlock positioned themselves on the roof of a saloon. Henry Newton Brown, Dick Smith, and George Coe defended a nearby adobe bunkhouse.

On Tuesday, July 16, newly appointed sheriff George Peppin sent sharpshooters to kill the McSween defenders at the saloon. Peppin's men retreated when one of the snipers, Charles Crawford, was killed by Fernando Herrera. Peppin then sent a request for assistance to Colonel Nathan Dudley, commandant of nearby Fort Stanton. In a reply to Peppin, Dudley refused to intervene but later arrived in Lincoln with troops, turning the battle in favor of the Murphy-Dolan faction.

A gunfight broke out on Friday, July 19. McSween's supporters gathered inside his house. When Buck Powell and Deputy Sheriff Jack Long set fire to the building, the occupants began shooting. Bonney and the other men fled the building when all but one room were on fire. During the confusion, McSween was shot and killed by Robert W. Beckwith, who was then shot and killed by Bonney.

== Outlaw ==
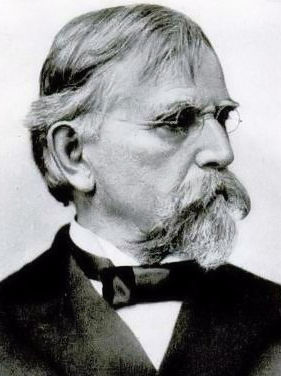
New Mexico Territorial Governor Lew Wallace in 1893

Bonney and three other survivors of the Battle of Lincoln were near the Mescalero Indian Agency when the agency bookkeeper, Morris Bernstein, was murdered on August 5, 1878. All four were indicted for the murder, despite conflicting evidence that Bernstein had been killed by Constable Atanacio Martinez. All of the indictments except Bonney's were later quashed.

On October 5, 1878, U.S. Marshal John Sherman informed newly appointed Territorial Governor and former Union Army general Lew Wallace that he held warrants for several men, including "William H. Antrim, alias Kid, alias Bonny [sic]" but was unable to execute them "owing to the disturbed condition of affairs in that county, resulting from the acts of a desperate class of men". Wallace issued an amnesty proclamation on November 13, 1878, which pardoned anyone involved in the Lincoln County War since Tunstall's murder. It specifically excluded persons who had been convicted of or indicted for a crime, and therefore excluded Bonney.

On February 18, 1879, Bonney and friend Tom O'Folliard were in Lincoln and watched as attorney Huston Chapman was shot and his corpse set on fire. According to eyewitnesses, the pair were innocent bystanders forced at gunpoint by Jesse Evans to witness the murder. Bonney wrote to Governor Wallace on March 13, 1879, with an offer to provide information on the Chapman murder in exchange for amnesty. On March 15, Governor Wallace replied, agreeing to a secret meeting to discuss the situation. He met with Wallace in Lincoln on March 17, 1879. During the meeting and in subsequent correspondence, Wallace promised Bonney protection from his enemies and clemency if he would testify before a grand jury. (Note: For years, Wallace denied that he had agreed to the bargain with Bonney; however, in a newspaper article published in 1902, Wallace changed his story and said he had promised him a pardon in exchange for the testimony.)

On March 20, Wallace wrote to Bonney, "to remove all suspicion of understanding, I think it better to put the arresting party in charge of Sheriff Kimbrell [sic], who shall be instructed to see that no violence is used." (Note: Letter from Governor Wallace to W.H. Bonney, March 20, 1879.) Bonney responded on the same day, agreeing to testify and confirming Wallace's proposal for his arrest and detention in a local jail to assure his safety. On March 21, he let himself be captured by a posse led by Sheriff George Kimball of Lincoln County. As agreed, Bonney provided a statement about Chapman's murder and testified in court. But after his testimony, the local district attorney refused to set him free. Still in custody several weeks later, Bonney began to suspect Wallace had used subterfuge and would never grant him amnesty. He escaped from the Lincoln County jail on June 17, 1879.

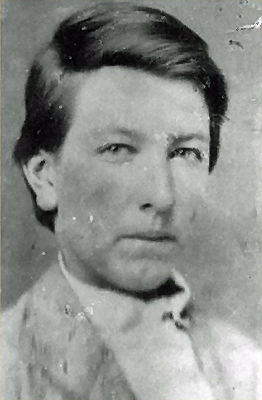
Tom O'Folliard, c. 1875

Bonney avoided further violence until January 10, 1880, when he shot and killed Joe Grant, a newcomer to the area, at Hargrove's Saloon in Fort Sumner. The Santa Fe Weekly New Mexican reported, "Billy Bonney, more extensively known as 'the Kid', shot and killed Joe Grant. The origin of the difficulty was not learned." According to other contemporary sources, Bonney had been warned that Grant intended to kill him. He walked up to Grant, told him he admired his revolver, and asked to examine it. Grant handed it over. Before returning the pistol, which he noticed contained only three cartridges, Bonney positioned the cylinder so the next hammer fall would land on an empty chamber. Grant suddenly pointed his pistol at Bonney's face and pulled the trigger. When it failed to fire, Bonney drew his own weapon and shot Grant in the head. A reporter for the Las Vegas Optic quoted Bonney as saying the encounter "was a game of two and I got there first".

In 1880, Bonney formed a friendship with a rancher named Jim Greathouse, who later introduced him to Dave Rudabaugh. On November 29, 1880, Bonney, Rudabaugh, and Billy Wilson ran from a posse led by sheriff's deputy James Carlysle. Cornered at Greathouse's ranch, he told the posse they were holding Greathouse as a hostage. Carlysle offered to exchange places with Greathouse, and Bonney accepted the offer. Carlysle later attempted to escape by jumping through a window, but he was shot three times and killed. The shootout ended in a standoff; the posse withdrew, and Bonney, Rudabaugh, and Wilson rode away.

A few weeks after the Greathouse incident, Bonney, Rudabaugh, Wilson, O'Folliard, Charlie Bowdre, and Tom Pickett rode into Fort Sumner. Unbeknownst to Bonney and his companions, a posse led by Pat Garrett was waiting for them. The posse opened fire, killing O'Folliard; the rest of the outlaws escaped unharmed.

=== Capture and escape ===
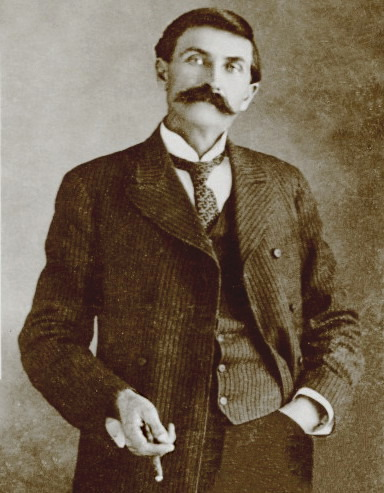
Sheriff Pat Garrett, c. 1903

On December 13, 1880, Governor Wallace posted a $500 bounty for Bonney's capture. Pat Garrett continued his search for Bonney; on December 23, following the siege in which Bowdre was killed, Garrett and his posse captured Bonney along with Pickett, Rudabaugh, and Wilson at Stinking Springs. The prisoners, including Bonney, were shackled and taken to Fort Sumner, then later to Las Vegas, New Mexico. When they arrived on December 26, they were met by crowds of curious onlookers.

The following day, an armed mob gathered at the train depot before the prisoners, who were already on board the train with Garrett, departed for Santa Fe. Deputy Sheriff Romero, backed by the angry group of men, demanded custody of Dave Rudabaugh, who during an unsuccessful escape attempt on April 5, 1880 shot and killed deputy Antonio Lino Valdez in the process. Garrett refused to surrender the prisoner, and a tense confrontation ensued until he agreed to let the sheriff and two other men accompany the party to Santa Fe, where they would petition the governor to release Rudabaugh to them. In a later interview with a reporter, Bonney said he was unafraid during the incident, saying, "if I only had my Winchester I'd lick the whole crowd." The Las Vegas Gazette ran a story from a jailhouse interview following Bonney's capture; when the reporter said Bonney appeared relaxed, he replied, "What's the use of looking on the gloomy side of everything? The laugh's on me this time."

After arriving in Santa Fe, Bonney, seeking clemency, sent Governor Wallace four letters over the next three months. Wallace refused to intervene, and he went to trial in April 1881 in Mesilla, New Mexico. Following two days of testimony, Bonney was found guilty of Sheriff Brady's murder; it was the only conviction secured against any of the combatants in the Lincoln County War. On April 13, Judge Warren Bristol sentenced him to hang, with his execution scheduled for May 13, 1881. Poet and journalist Arthur Chapman wrote in an essay that upon sentencing, the judge told Bonney he was going to hang until he was "dead, dead, dead", and his response was, "you can go to hell, hell, hell." Although this fabricated story eventually entered legend, according to the historical record, he did not speak after the reading of his sentence.

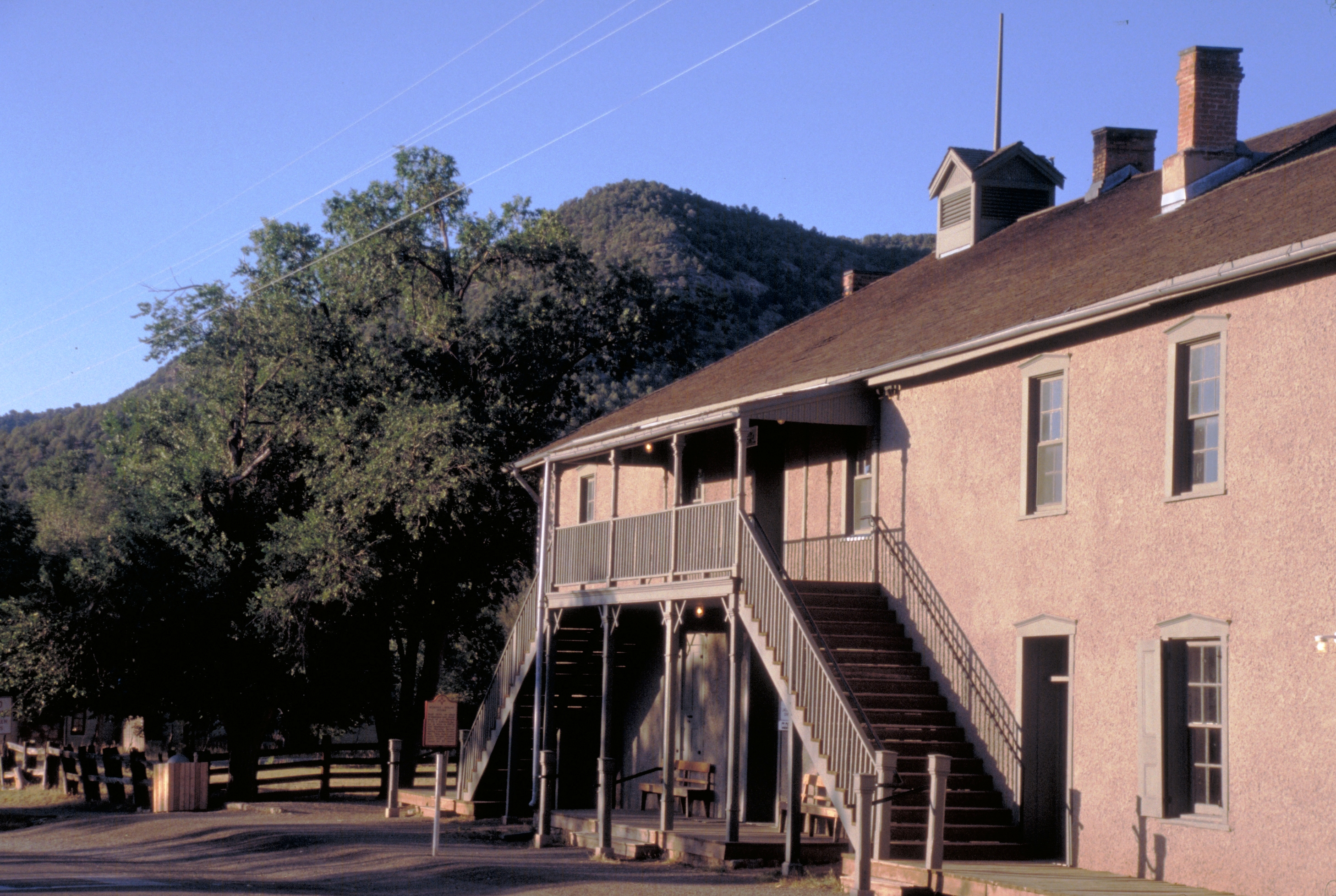
Courthouse and jail, Lincoln, New Mexico

Following his sentencing, Bonney was moved to Lincoln, where he was held under guard on the top floor of the town courthouse. On the evening of April 28, 1881, while Garrett was in White Oaks collecting taxes, Deputy Bob Olinger took five other prisoners across the street for a meal, leaving James Bell, another deputy, alone with Bonney at the jail. He asked to be taken outside to use the outhouse behind the courthouse; on their return to the jail, Bonney—who was walking ahead of Bell up the stairs to his cell—hid around a blind corner, slipped out of his handcuffs, and beat Bell with the loose end of the cuffs. During the ensuing scuffle, Bonney grabbed Bell's revolver and fatally shot him in the back as Bell tried to get away.

Bonney, with his legs still shackled, broke into Garrett's office and took a loaded shotgun left behind by Olinger. He waited at the upstairs window for Olinger to respond to the gunshot that killed Bell and called out to him, "Look up, old boy, and see what you get." When Olinger looked up, Bonney shot and killed him. After about an hour, Bonney freed himself from the leg irons with an axe. He obtained a horse and rode out of town; according to some stories, he was singing as he left Lincoln.

=== Recapture and death ===
While Bonney was on the run, Governor Wallace placed a new $500 bounty on the fugitive's head. Almost three months after his escape, Garrett, responding to rumors that Bonney was in the vicinity of Fort Sumner, left Lincoln with two deputies on July 14, 1881, to question resident Pete Maxwell, a friend of Bonney's. Maxwell, son of land baron Lucien Maxwell, spoke with Garrett the same day for several hours. Around midnight, the pair were sitting in Maxwell's darkened bedroom when Bonney unexpectedly entered.

Accounts vary as to the course of events. According to the canonical version, when he entered the room, Bonney failed to recognize Garrett due to the poor lighting. Drawing his revolver and backing away, Bonney asked "¿Quién es? ¿Quién es?" (Spanish for "Who is it? Who is it?"). Recognizing Bonney's voice, Garrett drew his revolver and fired twice. The first bullet struck Bonney in the chest just above his heart, while the second missed.

A few hours after the shooting, a local justice of the peace assembled a coroner's jury of six people. The jury members interviewed Maxwell and Garrett, and Bonney's body and the location of the shooting were examined. The jury certified the body as Bonney's and, according to a local newspaper, the jury foreman said, "It was the Kid's body that we examined." Bonney was given a wake by candlelight; he was buried the next day and his grave was denoted with a wooden marker.

Five days after Bonney's killing, Garrett traveled to Santa Fe, New Mexico, to collect the $500 reward offered by Governor Lew Wallace for his capture, dead or alive. William G. Ritch, the acting New Mexico governor, refused to pay the reward. Over the next few weeks, the residents of Las Vegas, Mesilla, Santa Fe, White Oaks, and other New Mexico cities raised over $7,000 in reward money for Garrett. A year and four days after Bonney's death, the New Mexico territorial legislature passed a special act to grant Garrett the $500 bounty reward promised by Governor Wallace.

Because people had begun to claim Garrett unfairly ambushed Bonney, Garrett felt the need to tell his side of the story and called upon his friend, journalist Marshall Upson, to ghostwrite a book for him. The book, The Authentic Life of Billy, the Kid, (Note: The full title of the Garrett-Upson book was The Authentic Life of Billy, the Kid, the Noted Desperado of the Southwest, Whose Deeds of Daring and Blood Made His Name a Terror in New Mexico, Arizona and Northern Mexico. By Pat. F. Garrett, Sheriff of Lincoln Co., N.M., By Whom He Was Finally Hunted Down and Captured by Killing Him.) was first published in April 1882. Although only a few copies were sold after its release, it later became a reference for historians who wrote about Bonney's life.

== Rumors of survival ==
Over time, legends grew claiming that Bonney was not killed, and that Garrett staged the incident and death out of friendship, so that Bonney could evade the law. During the next 50 years, a number of men claimed they were Billy the Kid. Most of these claims were easily disproven, but two have remained topics of discussion and debate.

In 1948, a central Texas man, Ollie P. Roberts, also known as Brushy Bill Roberts, began claiming he was Billy the Kid and went before New Mexico Governor Thomas J. Mabry seeking a pardon. Mabry dismissed Roberts' claims, and Roberts died shortly afterward. Nevertheless, Hico, Texas, Roberts' town of residence, capitalized on his claim by opening a Billy the Kid museum.

John Miller, an Arizona man, also claimed he was Bonney. This was unsupported by his family until 1938, some time after his death. Miller's body was buried in the state-owned Arizona Pioneers' Home Cemetery in Prescott, Arizona; in May 2005, Miller's teeth and bones were exhumed and examined, without permission from the state. DNA samples from the remains were sent to a laboratory in Dallas and tested to compare Miller's DNA with blood samples obtained from floorboards in the old Lincoln County courthouse and a bench where Bonney's body allegedly was placed after he was shot. According to a July 2015 article in The Washington Post, the lab results were "useless".

In 2004, researchers sought to exhume the remains of Catherine Antrim, Bonney's mother, whose DNA would be tested and compared with that of the body buried in William Bonney's grave. As of 2012, her body had not been exhumed.

In 2007, author and amateur historian Gale Cooper filed a lawsuit against the Lincoln County Sheriff's Office under the state Inspection of Public Records Act to produce records of the results of the 2006 DNA tests and other forensic evidence collected in the Billy the Kid investigations. In April 2012, 133 pages of documents were provided; they offered no conclusive evidence confirming or disproving the generally accepted story of Garrett's killing of Bonney, but confirmed the records' existence, and that they could have been produced earlier. In 2014, Cooper was awarded $100,000 in punitive damages but the decision was later overturned by the New Mexico Court of Appeals. The lawsuit ultimately cost Lincoln County nearly $300,000.

In February 2015, historian Robert Stahl petitioned a district court in Fort Sumner, asking the state of New Mexico to issue a death certificate for Bonney. In July 2015, Stahl filed suit in the New Mexico Supreme Court. The suit asked the court to order the state's Office of the Medical Investigator to officially certify Bonney's death under New Mexico state law.

== Photographs ==
As of 2025, only one authenticated photograph of Billy the Kid exists; other photographs purported to depict him are disputed.

=== Dedrick ferrotype ===
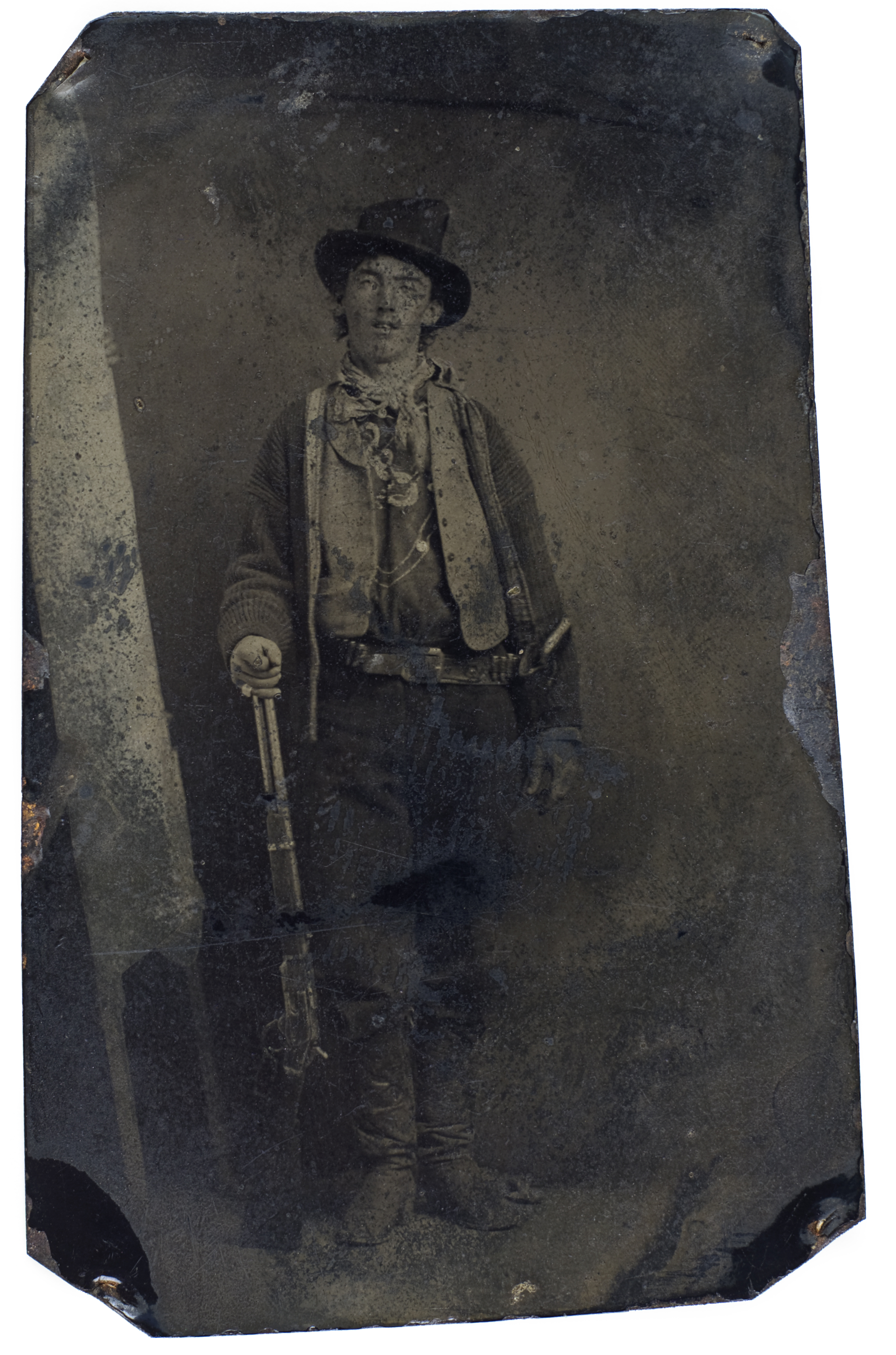
Unretouched original ferrotype of Billy the Kid, c. 1880

One of the few remaining artifacts of Bonney's life is a 2-by-3-inch (5.1-by-7.6-centimeter) ferrotype photograph of him, attributed to photographer Ben Wittick in late 1879 or early 1880. The image shows Bonney wearing a vest under a sweater, a slouch hat, and a bandana, while holding an 1873 Winchester rifle with its butt resting on the floor. For years, this was the only photograph of Bonney accepted by scholars and historians. The original ferrotype survived because Bonney's friend Dan Dedrick kept it after the outlaw's death. It was passed down through Dedrick's family and was copied several times, appearing in numerous publications during the 20th century. In June 2011, the original plate was bought at auction for $2.3 million by businessman William Koch.

The image shows Bonney wearing his holstered Colt revolver on his left side. This led to the belief that he was left-handed, without taking into account that the ferrotype process produces reversed images. In 1954, western historians James D. Horan and Paul Sann wrote that Bonney was right-handed and carried his pistol on his right hip. The opinion was confirmed by Clyde Jeavons, a former curator of the National Film and Television Archive. Several historians have written that Bonney was ambidextrous.

=== Croquet tintype ===
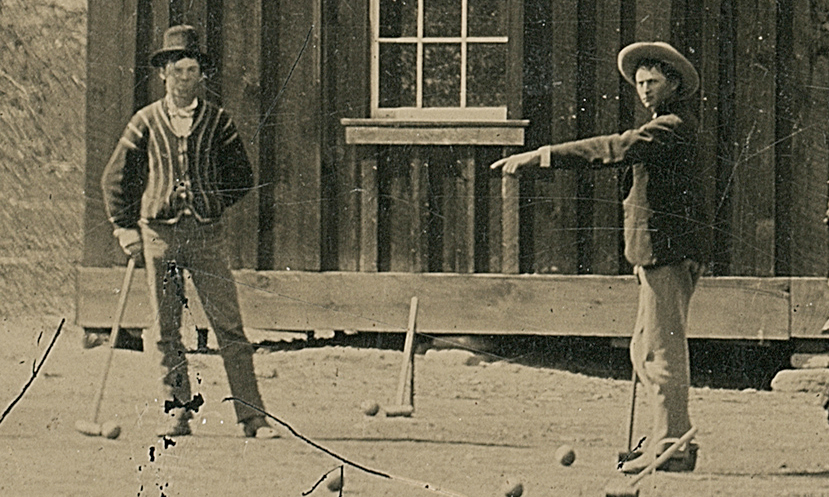
Detail from photograph purporting to show Bonney (left) playing croquet in 1878

A 4-by-6-inch (100 mm × 150 mm) ferrotype purchased in 2010 at a memorabilia shop in Fresno, California, has been claimed to show Bonney and members of the Regulators playing croquet. If authentic, it is the only known photo of Billy the Kid and the Regulators together and the only image to feature their wives and female companions. Collector Robert G. McCubbin and outlaw historian John Boessenecker concluded in 2013 that the photograph does not show Bonney. Whitny Braun, a professor and researcher, located an advertisement for croquet sets sold at Chapman's General Store in Las Vegas, New Mexico, dated to June 1878. Kent Gibson, a forensic video and still-image expert, offered his facial recognition software and stated that Bonney is indeed one of the individuals in the image.

In August 2015, Lincoln State Monument officials and the New Mexico Department of Cultural Affairs stated that, despite the new research, they could not confirm that the image showed Bonney or others from the Lincoln County War era, according to Monument manager Gary Cozzens. A photograph curator at the Palace of the Governors archives, Daniel Kosharek, said the image is "problematic on a lot of fronts", including the small size of the figures and the lack of resemblance of the background landscape to Lincoln County or the state in general. Editors from the True West Magazine staff said, "no one in our office thinks this photo is of the Kid [and the Regulators]."

In early October 2015, Kagin's, Inc., a numismatic authentication firm, said the image was authentic after a number of experts, including those associated with a 2015 National Geographic Channel program, examined it.

== Posthumous pardon request ==
In 2010, New Mexico Governor Bill Richardson turned down a request for a posthumous pardon of Bonney for the murder of Sheriff William Brady. The pardon was considered to fulfill Governor Lew Wallace's 1879 promise to Bonney. Richardson's decision, citing "historical ambiguity", was announced on December 31, 2010, his last day in office.

== Grave markers ==
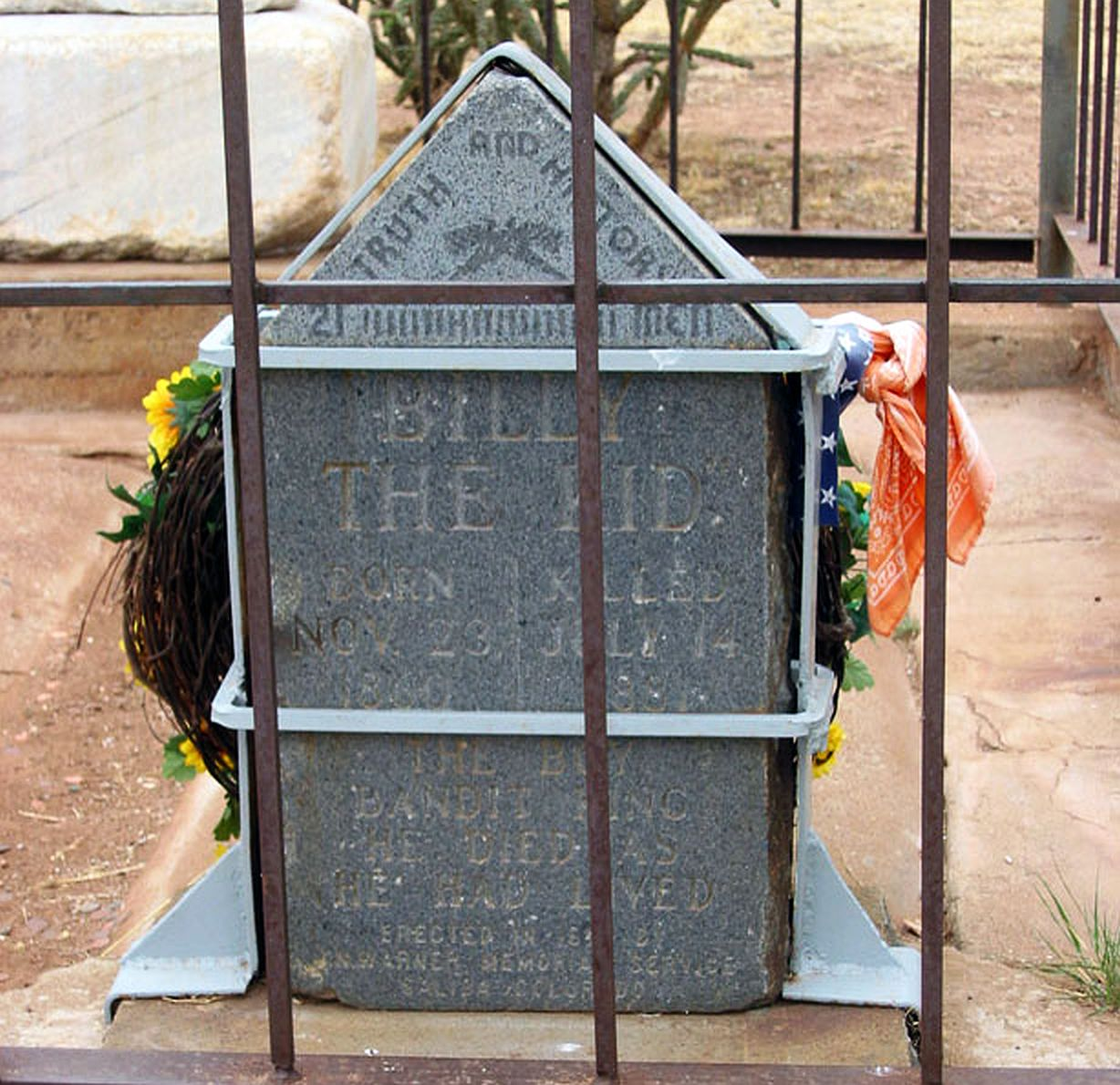
Grave marker for Billy The Kid, also at Fort Sumner, New Mexico

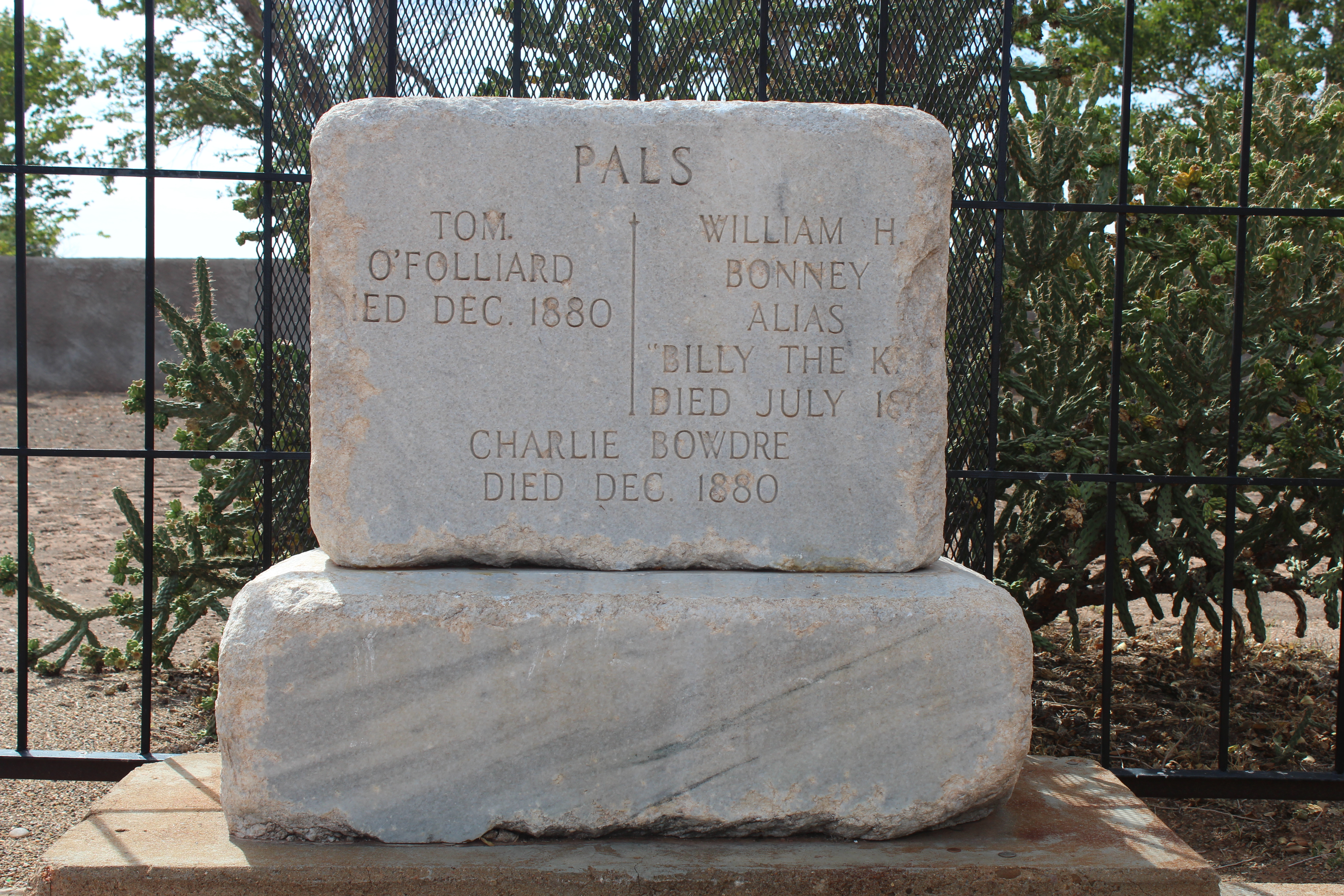
William H. Bonney (aka Billy the Kid), along with Tom O'Folliard and Charlie Bowdre "Pals" Headstone. (Photo taken in September 2012)

In 1931, Charles W. Foor, an unofficial tour guide at Fort Sumner Cemetery, campaigned to raise funds for a permanent marker for the graves of Bonney, O'Folliard, and Bowdre. As a result of his efforts, a stone memorial bearing the names of the three men and the dates of their deaths beneath the word "Pals" was erected at the center of the burial area.

In 1940, stone cutter James N. Warner of Salida, Colorado, made and donated to the cemetery a new marker for Bonney's grave. It was stolen on February 8, 1981, but recovered days later in Huntington Beach, California. New Mexico Governor Bruce King arranged for the county sheriff to fly to California to return it to Fort Sumner, where it was reinstalled in May 1981. Although both markers are behind iron fencing, a group of vandals entered the enclosure at night in June 2012 and tipped the stone over.

== In literature and the arts ==
The life and likeness of Billy the Kid have been frequently represented in comics, literature, film, music, theater, radio, television, and video games.

== See also ==
- Folklore of the United States
- List of Old West gunfighters
- List of Old West lawmen

== Sources ==
- Boomhower, Ray E. (2005). The Sword and the Pen. Indianapolis: Indiana Historical Society Press. p. 103. ISBN 0-87195-185-1.
- Cooper, Gale (2017). The Lost Pardon of Billy the Kid: An Analysis Factoring in the Santa Fe Ring, Governor Lew Wallace's Dilemma, and a Territory in Rebellion. Albuquerque, New Mexico: Gelcour Books. ISBN 978-0986070723.
- Etulain, Richard W. (2020). Billy the Kid: A Reader's Guide. University of Oklahoma Press. p. 177. ISBN 978-0-8061-6807-4.
- Jacobsen, Joel (1994). Such Men as Billy the Kid: The Lincoln County War Reconsidered. Lincoln: University of Nebraska Press. ISBN 978-0-8032-2576-3. OCLC 29429457.
- Lemay, John (September 16, 2020). The Man Who Invented Billy the Kid: The Authentic Life of Ash Upson. Bicep Books. ISBN 978-1-953221-91-9.
- Metz, Leon C. (1983) [1974]. Pat Garrett: The Story of a Western Lawman (reprint, revised ed.). Norman: University of Oklahoma Press. ISBN 978-0-8061-1838-3. OCLC 18722891.
- Nolan, Frederick W. (2009a). The Life and Death of John Henry Tunstall. Santa Fe, New Mexico: Sunstone Press. ISBN 978-0-86534-722-9. OCLC 440562959.
- Nolan, Frederick W. (1992). The Lincoln County War: A Documentary History. Norman: University of Oklahoma Press.
- Nolan, Frederick W. (1998). The West of Billy the Kid. Norman: University of Oklahoma Press. ISBN 0-8061-3082-2.
- Nolan, Frederick W. (2009) [1992]. The Lincoln County War: A Documentary History (revised ed.). Santa Fe, New Mexico: Sunstone Press. ISBN 978-0-86534-721-2. OCLC 319064671. Archived from the original on June 11, 2019.
- Nolan, Frederick (October 20, 2014). The Billy the Kid Reader. University of Oklahoma Press. ISBN 978-0-8061-8254-4.
- Simmons, Mark (2006). Stalking Billy the Kid: Brief Sketches of a Short Life. Sunstone Press. ISBN 0-86534-525-2.
- Utley, Robert M. (1987). High Noon in Lincoln: Violence on the Western Frontier. Albuquerque: University of New Mexico Press. ISBN 978-0-8263-1201-3. OCLC 15629305.
- Utley, Robert M. (1989). Billy the Kid: A Short and Violent Life. Lincoln: University of Nebraska Press. ISBN 978-0-8032-9558-2. OCLC 37868038. Archived from the original on June 11, 2019.
- Wallis, Michael (2007). Billy the Kid: The Endless Ride. New York: W.W. Norton & Co. ISBN 978-0-393-06068-3. OCLC 77270750.
