= Seven Rivers, New Mexico =

Coordinates: 32°35′42″N 104°25′18″W

Seven Rivers, New Mexico was formerly a ghost town, located between Carlsbad and Artesia, New Mexico. The town itself was first settled in the mid-1860s, and for a time thrived as a trading post. Its name derives from seven creeks that flowed through it, into the Pecos River. The Seven Rivers Warriors, a gang that operated on the Murphy-Dolan side of the Lincoln County War, used the town as its refuge. Both the Jessie Evans Gang and the John Kinney Gang also frequented the town during that time. The town grew in the 1880s with the addition of a schoolhouse, hotel, post office and saloons. The town eventually declined until only the cemetery remained until 1988, when the Brantley Dam was constructed and the cemetery was moved to Artesia.
