= Young Guns (film) =

1988 film by Christopher Cain

- Theatrical release poster
- Directed by: Christopher Cain
- Written by: John Fusco
- Produced by: Christopher Cain; Joe Roth
- Starring: Emilio Estevez; Kiefer Sutherland; Lou Diamond Phillips; Charlie Sheen; Dermot Mulroney; Casey Siemaszko; Terry O'Quinn; Jack Palance; Terence Stamp
- Cinematography: Dean Semler
- Edited by: Jack Hofstra
- Music by: Anthony Marinelli; Brian Banks
- Production company: Morgan Creek Productions
- Distributed by: 20th Century Fox (United States and Canada); Vestron International Group (International)
- Release date: August 12, 1988
- Running time: 107 minutes
- Country: United States
- Language: English
- Budget: $11 million
- Box office: $56 million

Young Guns is a 1988 American Western action film directed and produced by Christopher Cain and written by John Fusco. The film depicts a heavily fictionalized version of the actions of Billy the Kid and the Regulators during the Lincoln County War, in New Mexico in 1877–78. It stars Emilio Estevez as Billy, and Kiefer Sutherland, Lou Diamond Phillips, Estevez's brother Charlie Sheen, Dermot Mulroney, and Casey Siemaszko as other Lincoln County Regulators. The supporting cast features Terence Stamp, Terry O'Quinn, Brian Keith, and Jack Palance.

The first film to be produced by Morgan Creek Productions, Young Guns received mixed reviews, with critics polarized over its inaccuracies and story, despite praise for the cast's performances, and opened at number one at the US box office and eventually grossed $56 million against an $11-million budget. Because of the film's cast, it is often associated with the "Brat Pack" set of 1980s actors.

A sequel, Young Guns II, was released in 1990, with the principal cast reprising their roles.

== Plot ==
In Lincoln County, New Mexico, English cattleman John Tunstall hires a wayward young gunman named William “Billy the Kid” Bonney to join the "Regulators" who lived and worked on his ranch: Doc Scurlock, Jose Chavez y Chavez, Dick Brewer, "Dirty" Steve Stephens, and Charlie Bowdre. Tunstall tries to educate and civilize the young men in his employ, and clashes with rival rancher Lawrence Murphy, a well-connected Irishman in league with the corrupt Santa Fe Ring.

One of Murphy's hired hands, McCloskey, joins up with Tunstall, while Doc attempts to court Murphy's Chinese ward, Yen Sun. As New Year's Day starts, Murphy's men kill Tunstall, leading his lawyer friend Alexander McSween to arrange for the Regulators to be deputized and given warrants for the killers' arrest. Hotheaded Billy challenges Dick's authority as the group's foreman, as the Regulators attempt to take Murphy's henchmen in alive. Instead, Billy kills several unarmed men, including McCloskey, whom he suspected of feeding Murphy information. Newspapers paint the Regulators as a deadly gang headed by a larger-than-life outlaw, "Billy the Kid".

With bounty hunters seeking them all over the West and unsure where to go, Chavez leads the others on a peyote trip. One of the men on their warrants, Buckshot Roberts, tracks them down, and a shootout ensues. Roberts barricades himself in an outhouse and kills Dick, and as a reaction, the rest of the Regulators shoot up the outhouse, presumably killing Roberts. This leads the others to flee, while an injured Doc goes a separate way. Chavez reveals that Murphy's corruption led to the brutal murders of his mother and her Navajo tribe, and urged the others to abandon their need for bloodshed. Still, Billy takes charge as their new leader, determined to avenge Tunstall.

Doc visits Yen Sun before rejoining the gang, and they kill the corrupt Sheriff William J. Brady and his men. They meet with a furious Alex, who explains that their badges have been revoked. Though they are now wanted men, Billy insists their actions will bring attention to Murphy's corruption. While Charlie revisits a brothel, Billy kills an arrogant bounty hunter at a cantina, and the gang flees to Mexico, where Charlie marries a local woman. Soon-to-be-sheriff Pat Garrett warns Billy that Murphy's men will attempt to take Alex's life the following day.

At Alex's house in Lincoln, the gang is surrounded by Murphy's men and famed bounty hunter John Kinney. Realizing they were lured into a trap, the Regulators survive an entire day's shootout. Corrupt U.S. Army troops arrive in town, as does Murphy himself with Yen, who runs inside and is reunited with Doc. Murphy orders the soldiers to set fire to the house. Alex's wife is allowed to leave unharmed and Chavez slips away. Trapped in the burning attic, the gang throws Alex's possessions out of the window, including a trunk with Billy inside, allowing him to surprise their attackers. In the chaos, Chavez returns with their rescued horses, and Charlie and Kinney shoot each other dead. Doc and Yen ride away, and Steve is shot dead after getting a wounded Chavez onto the remaining horse to ride. Alex is gunned down by a Gatling gun, and Billy escapes after shooting Murphy between the eyes, killing him.

A narrated epilogue from Doc reveals that Chavez took work at a farm in California, while Doc moved east and married Yen Sun, while Alex's widow became one of the most prominent cattlewomen ever, and Murphy's ring of corruption collapsed, especially when Governor Axtell was forced to resign by President Hayes. Billy continued to ride until he was killed by Garrett and was buried next to Charlie at Fort Sumner, where someone later carved the epitaph: "PALS".

== Cast ==
- Emilio Estevez as William H. "Billy the Kid" Bonney, an orphaned renegade outlaw who leads the Regulators
- Kiefer Sutherland as Josiah Gordon "Doc" Scurlock, Billy's right hand in the Regulators
- Lou Diamond Phillips as Jose Chavez y Chavez, a Mestizo member of the Regulators
- Charlie Sheen as Richard "Dick" Brewer, Tunstall's foreman, the founder and original leader of the Regulators
- Dermot Mulroney as "Dirty" Steve Stephens, the crude-minded member of the Regulators
- Casey Siemaszko as Charlie Bowdre, the tense and dumbfounded member of the Regulators
- Terence Stamp as John Tunstall, an English rancher who employed the ranch hands whom he mentored and turned Regulators upon his death
- Jack Palance as Lawrence Murphy, an Irish rancher connected to the Santa Fe Ring
- Terry O'Quinn as Alexander McSween, a lawyer who opposed the Ring and deputized the Regulators
- Sharon Thomas as Susan McSween, Alex's wife
- Alice Carter as Yen Sun, a Chinese emigrant and Murphy's mistress who catches Doc's eye
- Geoffrey Blake as J. McCloskey, one of Murphy's henchmen posing as one of Tunstall's regulators
- Brian Keith as Buckshot Roberts, a seasoned bounty hunter hired by Murphy to eliminate the Regulators
- Patrick Wayne as Pat Garrett, a lawman who was once allied with the Regulators
- Danny Kamin as Sheriff William J. Brady; the corrupt Sheriff of Lincoln County on Murphy's payroll
- Allen Keller as John Kinney, a civil war veteran turned bounty hunter on Murphy's payroll
- Victor Izay as Judge John B. Wilson, the elected judge in Lincoln County
- Thomas Calloway as Texas Joe Grant, a suave and sharp dressed bounty hunter from Texas with a finely crafted pistol
- Lisa Banes as Mallory
- Pat Finn-Lee as Janey
- Craig Erickson as George Peppin, interim sheriff of Lincoln County, appointed after Brady is killed
- Jeremy Lepard as James Dolan
- Gary Kanin as Nathan Dudley

In addition, Tom Cruise briefly appears in a non-speaking cameo role as one of Murphy's henchmen that is shot and killed by Charlie during the climactic shootout. Cruise made the appearance while visiting friends on the set. Country musician Randy Travis has a cameo as a Gatling gunner.

== Production ==
Screenwriter John Fusco developed an interest in Billy the Kid and the Lincoln County War while living in the American Southwest in the 1970s. He spent five months in New Mexico researching the incident and Billy's life. He first met director Christopher Cain while working as a script doctor on his film The Principal. Cain committed to the project after reading just sixteen pages of Fusco's first draft, and suggested Emilio Estevez for the leading role, following their collaboration on That Was Then... This Is Now. Cain initially wanted Sutherland to portray Billy, but Estevez convinced him he was suitable for the part.

Filming took place mainly on location in Santa Fe County, New Mexico. The town of Los Cerrillos was redressed to look like an 1870s Lincoln County.

Estevez later said "John Fusco wrote a magnificent script, but then it was turned into what I call Hollywood's first heavy-metal western. It was just an excuse for a personality piece featuring all these young actors, and I was very disappointed."

== Music ==
James Horner, whom director Cain had previously worked with on The Stone Boy (1984) and Where the River Runs Black (1986), was originally hired as the film's composer. His score was rejected however, and was replaced by a new score composed by Brian Banks and Anthony Marinelli shortly before release. Some early promotional materials still list Horner as the composer.

== Historical accuracy ==
In a June 1990 magazine, New Mexico historian Paul Andrew Hutton regarded Young Guns as more historically accurate in some ways than earlier cinematic incarnations of the Lincoln County War and Billy the Kid, though he noted some inaccuracies. Author Johnny D. Boggs notes that much of the script was fictionalised with some characters and events changed for dramatic effect. Tunstall was killed on February 18, not on New Year's Day. The Red Sand Creek massacre is fictional. The portrayal of the gunfight at the McSween house, is considered one of the most historically inaccurate portions of the film. Bowdre, Stephens and John Kinney survived. McSween was killed by Murphy-Dolan men, not an Army Gatling gun. Murphy's death also did not collapse the Santa Fe Ring.

The relationship between Tunstall and Murphy was particularly close to the historical reality (as it was in Chisum). The killings of Hill and McCloskey are also particularly close to the historical record as well. The portrayals of Josiah Gordon "Doc" Scurlock, Jose Chavez y Chavez, Richard "Dick" Brewer, and Charlie Bowdre, all of whom are not in earlier cinematic versions of the story are regarded as realistic, John Chisum is omitted (the character did appear in the sequel).

Artistic licenses include the age of John Tunstall, who was 24 years old at death, but is played by then-49-year-old Terence Stamp and is depicted as a father figure to the Regulators, when in fact he was only six years older than Billy and was more of a mentor. Doc Scurlock's romance with Yen Sun is completely fictional; the real Scurlock was married to a Hispanic woman named María Antonia Miguela Herrera before the Lincoln County War started, and Murphy was not known to have a Chinese mistress.

The climactic siege at Alexander McSween's property is truncated for the film; the real event lasted five days while the film only shows two days. Lawrence Murphy is shown killed by Billy during the siege, when in fact he was not present for the battle, and died of cancer several months later.

The film cuts down the number of Regulators from the historical eleven to six. The AFI Catalog notes that characteristics of Regulators John Middleton and Yginio Salazar are absorbed into the film's depictions of Stephens and Chavez.

== Release ==
Young Guns opened August 12, 1988 in the United States and Canada. Internationally, it was distributed by Vestron. It opened the Deauville Film Festival on September 2, 1988 before starting its international release in Japan on November 12, 1988. It opened in Australia in December and in the United Kingdom in 1989.

=== Home media ===
The film was released on video by Vestron Home Video on January 4, 1989, and on DVD on March 17, 1998, by Artisan Home Entertainment. This film was released on UMD for PlayStation Portable on October 10, 2005. On December 5, 2023, Lionsgate Home Video released the film in 4K in a standard edition as well as a Best Buy exclusive Steelbook. Both the standard and Steelbook releases contain two discs: the 4K Blu-ray, along with a remastered in 4K 1080p Blu-ray.

== Reception ==
=== Box office ===
The movie was a box-office hit, and grossed $45.7 million in the US and Canada. Internationally it grossed $11 million for a worldwide total of $56 million.

=== Critical response ===
Young Guns received mixed reviews from critics. It holds a 43% rating on Rotten Tomatoes based on 40 reviews, with an average rating of 4.7/10 with the consensus: "Young Guns rounds up a posse of attractive young leads, but this cheerfully shallow Brat Pack western ultimately has too much hat and not enough cattle." Metacritic gave the film a score of 50 based on 13 people, indicating "mixed or average reviews". Audiences polled by CinemaScore gave the film an average grade of "A-" on an A+ to F scale. Ian Nathan of Empire gave the film two out of five, praising Estevez's performance but felt the cast to be underused, and criticised the lack of depth, ultimately feeling the film to be "badly realised and altogether a bit flat". Alex von Tunzelmann of The Guardian gave the film a grade of B, feeling the film to be "good, solid, brainless fun" but criticised its inaccuracies and portrayal of the characters as cartoon characters, feeling the film made history "actually less colourful". Casimir Harlow praised the cast's performances (especially Estevez's portrayal of Billy) and the film's soundtrack, calling Young Guns a "cracking, wild whirlwind of a ride". Michael Cavender praised the sets, performances but felt Sheen, Palance and Wayne to be underused.

== Sequels ==
A sequel, titled Young Guns II, was released in 1990. The film focuses on Billy and the surviving Regulators time as outlaws between 1879 and his official death in 1881. Principal cast members Estevez, Sutherland, and Phillips returned, as did writer John Fusco. William Petersen replaced Patrick Wayne as Pat Garrett. Other new cast members included Christian Slater, Alan Ruck, and James Coburn.

In 2025, Estevez announced that a third film, titled Young Guns III: Dead or Alive, was in development and would begin production in the fall.

== See also ==
- List of films featuring hallucinogens
- Gore Vidal's Billy the Kid, 1989 television film
- List of works about Billy the Kid
