= Gunfight at Blazer's Mill =

Shootout between the Lincoln County Regulators and Buckshot Roberts

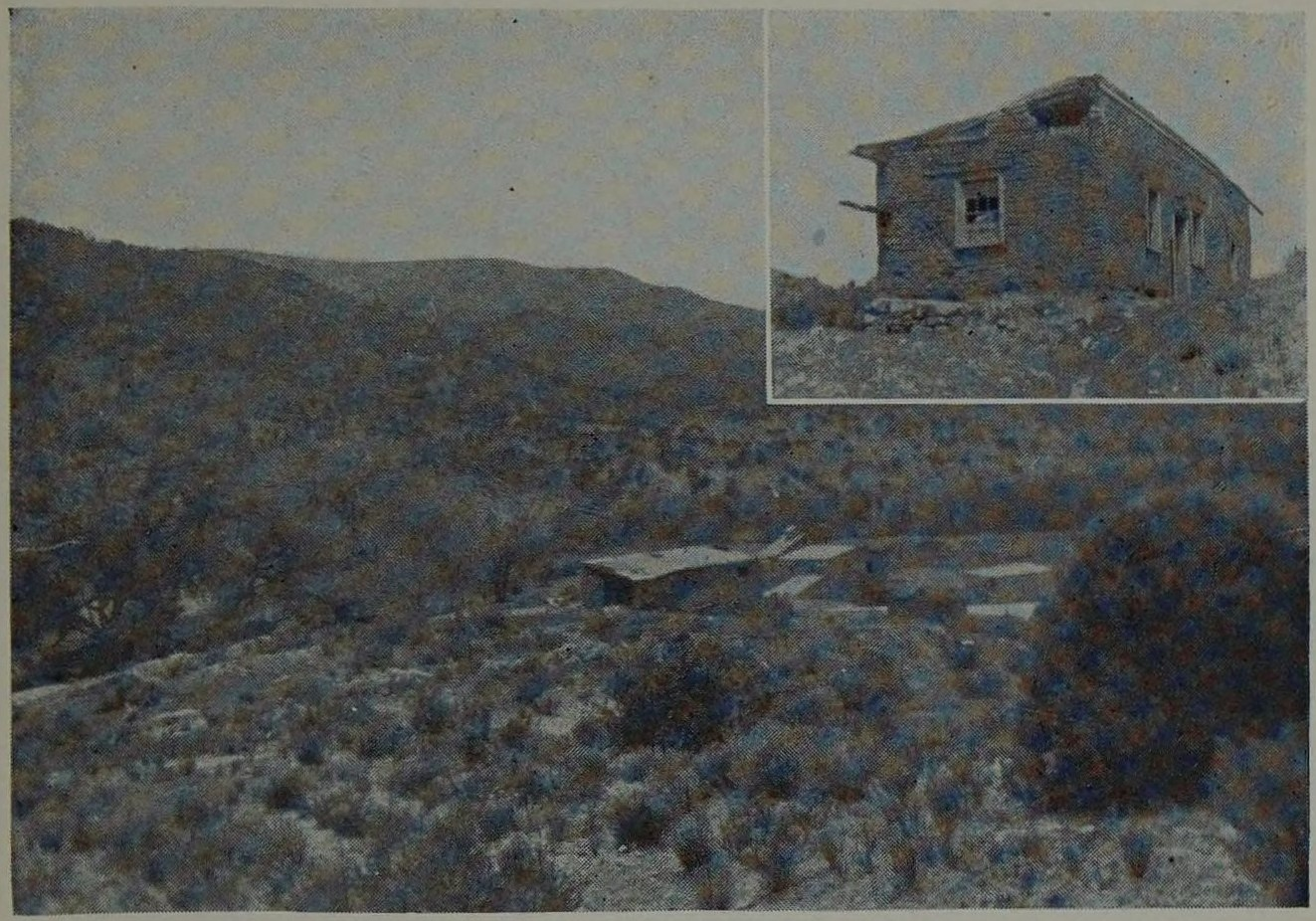
Blazer’s Mill, where took place the fight with Buckshot Roberts. The inset shows what remains of the building in which Roberts took refuge. (c. 1927 photograph)

The Gunfight at Blazer's Mill (April 4, 1878) was a shootout between what were known as the Lincoln County Regulators and buffalo hunter Buckshot Roberts.

== The gunfight ==
The Regulators, including Billy the Kid, Charlie Bowdre, and led by Richard "Dick" Brewer, were in the process of hunting down anyone believed to have been associated with the murder of John Tunstall, which had sparked the Lincoln County War. Roberts had been implicated in crimes associated with the "Murphy-Dolan" faction, but in reality it is believed he wanted nothing to do with the ongoing range war.

Blazer's Mill was located on a hillside between Lincoln, New Mexico and Tularosa, and was owned by Dr. Joseph H. Blazer, a dentist. The area included a large two-story house, a large square office building, a sawmill, a grist mill, several one story adobe structures and houses, a post office, a general store, and a number of corrals and barns. Three days earlier, the Regulators had killed Sheriff Brady and Deputy Hindman, and were in Blazer's Mill to have a good meal at Mrs. Godfrey's Restaurant. (See Dead Right: the Lincoln County War. Clifford Caldwell)

The Regulators known to be present that day included Brewer, Bowdre, William McCarty (aka Billy the Kid), Doc Scurlock, Frank McNab, George Coe, Frank Coe, John Middleton, Jim French, Henry Newton Brown, Fred Waite, and several lesser-known others.

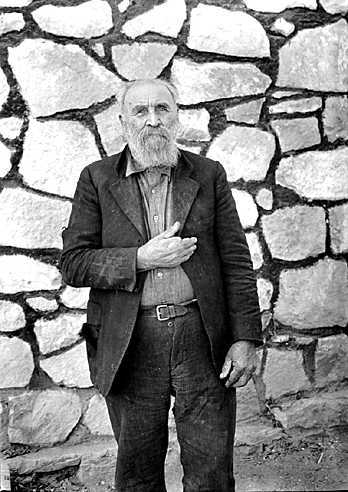
George W. Coe, survivor of the Blazer's Mill fight, in 1934

Buckshot Roberts wanted no part in the Lincoln County War and had made plans to leave the area, selling his ranch and waiting for the check from his buyer. On the day in question, Roberts rode his mule into Blazer’s Mills, a sawmill and trading post located on the Rio Tularosa. Looking to collect his check, he was shocked to discover that the entire upper echelon of the Regulators were eating lunch in a nearby building. They had left the area around Lincoln, New Mexico after killing Sheriff Brady just three days earlier. One of them, Frank Coe, sat with Roberts on the steps of the main house and tried to talk him into surrendering. The old gunman refused, believing he would be killed by the vengeful cowboys.

Regulator chief Dick Brewer grew impatient with the stand-off and sent a few of his men outside to take Roberts into custody. At the sight of the armed, quickly walking cowboys, Roberts jumped up, aiming his Winchester. Both he and Charlie Bowdre fired at the same time. Roberts was struck in the stomach while his shot hit Bowdre’s belt buckle, severing his gun belt and knocking the wind from him. Dangerously wounded, Roberts kept pumping bullets at the Regulators as he retreated to the doorway. John Middleton was seriously wounded in the chest. One slug grazed Doc Scurlock and another struck George Coe in the right hand, costing him his trigger finger. Once Roberts' rifle clicked empty, Billy the Kid dashed from cover to finish off the wounded gunman, only to be knocked senseless by the barrel of the Winchester.

Barricading himself in the house, Buckshot Roberts ignored both his painful wound and the Regulators’ gunshots, armed himself with a single-shot .50-70 Government Springfield rifle belonging to Blazer (one source claims it was a Sharps rifle which belonged to Dr. Appel) and readied himself for a fresh onslaught. Stunned by the turn of events, the Regulators tended to their wounded and tried to get Roberts to come out. Frustrated that none of his men dared to approach the fortified adversary, Brewer circled around the main house, and took cover behind some stacked logs and opened fire on the room where the wounded man was lying prone on a mattress in front of the barricaded doorway. Roberts, seeing the cloud of gun smoke from the log pile, opened fire when Brewer put his head up again, striking the cowboy in the eye. The Regulators, demoralized by their casualties, pulled out and left the area. Buckshot Roberts died the next day and he and Dick Brewer were buried side by side near the big house where the gunfight occurred.
