= Billy the Kid (TV series) =

American Western drama series

- Title card for the first season
- Genre: Western
- Created by: Michael Hirst
- Written by: Michael Hirst
- Starring: Tom Blyth; Eileen O'Higgins; Daniel Webber; Alex Roe
- Country of origin: United States
- Original language: English
- No. of seasons: 3
- No. of episodes: 24

Production
- Executive producers: Michael Hirst; Donald De Line; Darryl Frank; Justin Falvey; Otto Bathurst; Toby Leslie; Rola Bauer
- Producers: Nick Iannelli; Tom Blyth
- Production location: Alberta
- Cinematography: Ronald Paul Richard; Paul Sarossy
- Running time: 45–54 minutes
- Production companies: Amblin Television; One Big Picture; De Line Pictures; MGM Television; MGM+ Studios

Original release
- Network: Epix
- Release: April 24 – June 5, 2022
- Network: MGM+
- Release: October 15, 2023 – November 23, 2025

Billy the Kid is an American Western drama television series created by Michael Hirst set in the 19th-century American Old West. It stars Tom Blyth as outlaw and gunfighter Billy the Kid. The series premiered on Epix on April 24, 2022. In January 2023, the series was renewed for a second season, split into two parts. The first part premiered on the rebranded MGM+ on October 15, 2023, with the second part premiering on June 2, 2024. In October 2024, the series was renewed for a third and final season that premiered on September 28, 2025.

== Cast and characters ==
=== Main ===
- Tom Blyth as Henry McCarty / Billy the Kid
  - Jonah Collier portrays a young Henry McCarty
- Eileen O'Higgins as Kathleen McCarty (season 1; guest season 2)
- Daniel Webber as Jesse Evans
- Alex Roe as Sheriff Pat Garrett (seasons 2–3; guest season 1)

=== Recurring ===
Tunstall–McSween Faction & Lincoln County Regulators

- Luke Camilleri as Alexander "Alex" McSween (seasons 1–2)
- Horatio Hirst (Note: Credited as "Horatio James" for the first two seasons.) as Charlie Bowdre
- Brendan Fletcher as George Coe
- Nuria Vega as Dulcinea del Tobosco
- Veronica Long as Manuela Bowdre
- Lisa Chandler as Susan "Sue" McSween (season 2; guest season 1)
- Benjamin Sutherland (guest season 1) and Linus Roache (season 2) as John Tunstall
- Josh Cruddas as Fred Waite (season 2; guest season 3)
- Reilly Dolman as Richard "Dick" Brewer (season 2)
- Tom Carey as John Middleton (season 2)
- Pepe Johnson as Tom O'Folliard (seasons 2–3)
- Javier Lacroix as Juan Patrón (seasons 2–3)
- Josh Zaharia as Diego Patrón (season 2)
- Sean Depner as Henry Brown (season 3)
- Augusto Bitter as Garcia (season 3)

Murphy–Riley Faction & Jesse Evans Gang

- Sean Owen Roberts as Bob Olinger
- Dakota Daulby as John Beckwith (seasons 1–2)
- Ian Tracey as Frank Baker (seasons 1–2)
- Vincent Walsh as Major Lawrence Murphy (seasons 1–2; guest season 3)
- Shaun Benson as John Riley
- Chad Rook as James Dolan (season 1; guest season 2)
- Bill MacDonald as Sheriff William Brady (seasons 1–2)
- Mark Krysko as Andrew "Buckshot" Roberts (season 2)
- Quentin Schneider as William Morton (season 2)

Other

- Zak Santiago as Sheriff Saturnino Baca (seasons 1–2; guest season 3)
- Jason Burkart as Sam Wortley (seasons 2–3; guest season 1)
- Matthijs van de Sande Bakhuyzen as Edgar Walz (season 2; guest season 3)
- David Cubitt as Thomas Catron (seasons 2–3)
- David LeReaney as Judge John Wilson (season 2; guest season 3)
- Ty Olsson as Colonel Nathan Dudley (season 2)
- Shaun Smyth as Pete Maxwell (season 3)
- Hannah Galway as Emily Walz (season 3)
- Anthony F. Ingram as Milt Virdin (season 3)

=== Guest ===
- Joey Batey as Patrick McCarty (season 1)
- Leif Nystrom and Nash Nystrom as Joe McCarty (season 1)
- Timothy Webber as Moss (seasons 1–2)
- Jamie Beamish as Henry Antrim (season 1)
- Ryan Kennedy as Ash Upson (season 1)
- Michael Adamthwaite as Alias (season 1)
- Christie Burke as Barbara Jones (season 1)
- Guillermo Alonso as Melquiades Segura (season 1)
- Siobhan Williams as Irene Riley (season 1)
- Ty Provost as José Chávez (season 1)
- Jasmine Vega as Ana Baca (seasons 2–3)
- Guilherme Babilônia as Yginio del Tobosco (season 2)
- Manuel Uriza as Antonio del Tobosco (season 2)
- Ana-Maria Alvarado as Isabella del Tobosco (season 2)
- Iván López as José (season 2)
- Kurtis Sanheim as Lieutenant George Smith (season 2)
- Andrew David Long as Dr. Clay (season 2)
- Sage Kitchen as Alice Clay (season 2)
- Jason Cermak as Huston Chapman (season 2)
- Anthony Lemke as Governor Lew Wallace (seasons 2–3)
- Hugo Raymundo as Miguel Otero (season 3)
- Charlie Gould as Rachel (season 3)
- Thomas Elms as James Bell (season 3)
- Bradley Stryker as John Selman (season 3)
- Christopher Heyerdahl as McDaniels (season 3)
- Paul McGillion as Madison (season 3)

== Episodes ==
=== Series overview ===
| Season | Episodes | | Originally released | | |
| Season | Episodes | | First released | Last released | Network |
|---|---|---|---|---|---|
| 1 | 8 | | April 24, 2022 | June 5, 2022 | Epix |
| 2 | 8 | 4 | October 15, 2023 | November 5, 2023 | MGM+ |
| 2 | 8 | 4 | June 2, 2024 | June 23, 2024 | MGM+ |
| 3 | 8 | | September 28, 2025 | November 23, 2025 | MGM+ |

=== Season 1 (2022) ===
| No. overall | No. in season | Title | Directed by | Written by | Original release date |
|---|---|---|---|---|---|
| 1 | 1 | "The Immigrants" | Otto Bathurst | Michael Hirst | April 24, 2022 |
| 2 | 2 | "The Rattler" | Otto Bathurst | Michael Hirst | April 24, 2022 |
| 3 | 3 | "Antrim" | Rachel Leiterman | Michael Hirst | April 24, 2022 |
| 4 | 4 | "Interlude" | Rachel Leiterman | Michael Hirst | May 1, 2022 |
| 5 | 5 | "The Little Bit of Paradise" | Michael Nankin | Michael Hirst | May 8, 2022 |
| 6 | 6 | "Fate" | Michael Nankin | Michael Hirst | May 15, 2022 |
| 7 | 7 | "At the House" | David Frazee | Michael Hirst | May 22, 2022 |
| 8 | 8 | "The Rampage" | David Frazee | Michael Hirst | June 5, 2022 |

=== Season 2 (2023–24) ===
| No. overall | No. in season | Title | Directed by | Written by | Original release date |
|---|---|---|---|---|---|
Part 1
| 9 | 1 | "The Road to Hell" | Rachel Leiterman | Michael Hirst | October 15, 2023 |
| 10 | 2 | "Sickness" | Rachel Leiterman | Michael Hirst | October 22, 2023 |
| 11 | 3 | "The Agony" | David Frazee | Michael Hirst | October 29, 2023 |
| 12 | 4 | "The Day of the Dead" | David Frazee | Michael Hirst | November 5, 2023 |
Part 2
| 13 | 5 | "A Debt Collected" | Adam Kane | Michael Hirst | June 2, 2024 |
| 14 | 6 | "The Plea" | Adam Kane | Michael Hirst | June 9, 2024 |
| 15 | 7 | "The Blood-Soaked Bible" | John Fawcett | Michael Hirst | June 16, 2024 |
| 16 | 8 | "An Invitation" | John Fawcett | Michael Hirst | June 23, 2024 |

=== Season 3 (2025) ===
| No. overall | No. in season | Title | Directed by | Written by | Original release date |
|---|---|---|---|---|---|
| 17 | 1 | "The Beginning of the End" | Rachel Leiterman | Michael Hirst | September 28, 2025 |
| 18 | 2 | "Two Shots" | Rachel Leiterman | Michael Hirst | October 5, 2025 |
| 19 | 3 | "Take Your Medicine" | Adam Kane | Michael Hirst | October 12, 2025 |
| 20 | 4 | "The Shepherd's Hut" | Adam Kane | Michael Hirst | October 19, 2025 |
| 21 | 5 | "Breaking the Shackles" | David Frazee | Michael Hirst | October 26, 2025 |
| 22 | 6 | "The Chain Gang" | David Frazee | Michael Hirst | November 9, 2025 |
| 23 | 7 | "The Last Buffalo" | Adam Kane | Michael Hirst | November 16, 2025 |
| 24 | 8 | "The Redeemed" | Adam Kane | Michael Hirst | November 23, 2025 |

== Production ==
=== Development ===
On May 4, 2021, it was announced that Epix greenlit the series for an eight-episode first season, which will be written and executive produced by Michael Hirst. It was also announced that Otto Bathurst will direct the first two episodes. Production companies involved with the series include Epix, MGM International TV Productions and Nordic Entertainment Group. On January 10, 2023, the series was renewed for a second season. On October 1, 2024, the series was renewed for a third and final season.

=== Casting ===
On May 13, 2021, it was announced that Tom Blyth had been cast in the series' title role. On August 27, 2021, it was announced that Daniel Webber had been cast as Jesse Evans.

=== Filming ===
Principal photography for the series took place in and around Calgary, Alberta, Canada.

== Release ==
The first episode was screened in March 2022 at the Series Mania festival in Lille, France. The first season premiered in the United States on Epix on April 24, 2022. The first part of the second season premiered on the rebranded MGM+ on October 15, 2023, with the second part premiering on June 2, 2024. The third and final season premiered on September 28, 2025.

In Australia, it was distributed by Stan. In Canada and Latin America, it was made available to stream on Paramount+.

== Reception ==
Review aggregator Rotten Tomatoes reported an approval rating of 50% with an average rating of 5.90 out of 10.
