= Susan McSween =

American businesswoman and rancher

Susan McSween (née Hummer; December 30, 1845 – January 3, 1931) was a prominent cattlewoman of the 19th century, once called the "Cattle Queen of New Mexico", and the widow of Alexander McSween, a leading factor in the Lincoln County War, who was shot and killed by members of the Murphy-Dolan faction.

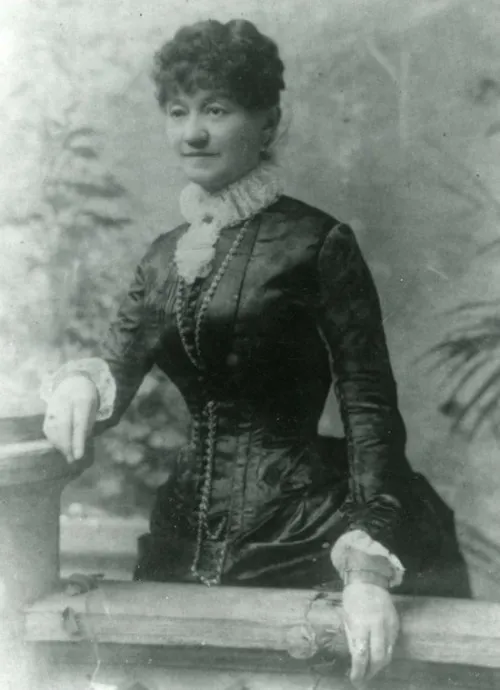
Susan McSween

== Early life, Lincoln County War ==
Born in Adams County, Pennsylvania, from a German Baptist (Dunkard) background, she left home at an early age after her mother had died and her father remarried. She married Alexander McSween on August 23, 1873 in Atchison, Kansas and they settled in Eureka, Kansas. In 1875, the couple moved to Lincoln, New Mexico, where her husband had accepted a job with the company of Lawrence Murphy. Working alongside James Dolan, McSween soon lost his desire to work for the company, and had by that time become friends with John Tunstall, a wealthy English rancher. Through Tunstall, the couple met John Chisum, and by 1877 the three men had established a rival business to the Murphy-Dolan businesses who had completely monopolized every business transaction in Lincoln. The Murphy-Dolan faction was backed by the infamous Santa Fe Ring.

Problems between the two factions began there, and on February 18, 1878, outlaw Jesse Evans and members of his gang working with "the boys" from the rival faction of James Dolan also known as The Santa Fe Ring, shot and killed Tunstall, which sparked the Lincoln County War. By that time, Tunstall and McSween had hired gunmen to counter those hired by Murphy-Dolan. While the latter had hired outlaw gangs like the Seven Rivers Warriors, John Kinney Gang, and the Jesse Evans Gang, Tunstall hired individuals, to include Billy the Kid, Chavez y Chavez, Dick Brewer, Charlie Bowdre, Doc Scurlock and others. The two factions clashed over Tunstall's death, with numerous people being killed by both sides culminating in the Battle of Lincoln, in which Susan McSween was present. Her husband was killed at the end of that battle, despite his being unarmed and attempting to surrender.

Susan McSween hired attorney Huston Chapman to pursue charges against those responsible for her husband's death and had him assist in negotiating with Governor Lew Wallace on amnesty for the Lincoln County Regulators who had defended her husband and sought vengeance for Tunstall's death. Colonel Nathan Dudley was one of her main targets, and he did stand trial, but was acquitted. Lawrence Murphy had died before the end of 1878, and James Dolan was charged in Tunstall's murder, but acquitted, and could never be linked directly to Alex McSween's murder. Jesse Evans killed Chapman, then fled the territory, after which eventually the whole matter simply went away.

== After the range war ==
Susan struggled in the aftermath of the Lincoln County War to make ends meet in New Mexico Territory. She sought and received help from John Tunstall's family in England. She served as executor of John's estate and that of her husband, managing to free herself of their accrued debts by liquidating the estate assets. In 1880 she married George Barber, a young law clerk and later attorney, who aided in her recovery. Barber's work as a surveyor for John Chisum resulted in Chisum gifting 40 head of cattle to Susan worth about $400 to start her into the cattle business. Later the couple divorced.

Susan took over 1,158 acres of land on the West side of the Mescalero Apache Indian Reservation in the years after the Lincoln County War ended. By 1890 she had expanded the acreage of the ranch and ran at least 5,000 head of cattle under the Three Rivers Cattle Company brand in Three Rivers. By some estimates she owned upward of 8,000 By the mid-1890s her ranch holdings were some of the largest in the territory. She became extremely wealthy through cattle sales and mining a small silver vein on the property. She was also known for the fruit orchards she planted with trees she obtained from John Chisum.

On April 21, 1892, the Old Abe Eagle of Lincoln reported that she had driven 700 to 800 cattle from her ranch to Engle, the most accessible railroad point, from which place they were shipped "in 38 foot New England Cars" to the Jones and Nolan feed lots in Grand Summit and Strong City, Kansas.

The New York Commercial Advertiser said:

"Near the town of White Oaks, New Mexico, lives one of the most remarkable women of this remarkable age, at the present time a visitor in this city (New York). The house in which she lives; a low, whitewashed adobe building, is covered with green vines and fitted out with rich carpets, artistic hangings, books and pictures, exquisite china and silver, and all the dainty belongings with which a refined woman wishes to surround herself. The house was built with her own hands. The huge ranch on which it is located with its 8,000 cattle, is managed entirely by her. It is she who buys or takes up the land, selects and controls the men, buys, sells and transfers the cattle. She is also a skillful and intelligent prospector, and found the valuable silver mine on her territory in which she now holds a half interest."

== Last years/death ==
In 1902 she sold her ranch holdings (with the exception of the ranch house) to Monroe Harper, moving to a house and later a cottage in White Oaks, New Mexico, by that time a declining boomtown. Over time, she went through the money she had accrued making frequent trips to El Paso to divest herself of the jewelry she had acquired in order to support herself, although she was supported in later life by her nephew Edgar Shields.

She died from pneumonia, an impoverished woman in White Oaks, on January 3, 1931, aged 85, and is buried there in the Cedarvale Cemetery.

== In popular culture and media ==
- She is portrayed by Sharon Thomas in the 1988 movie Young Guns. The epilogue states that following the death of her husband she became a prominent cattlewoman; however she was not depicted in the film's sequel.
- She is portrayed by Lynda Day George in the 1970 John Wayne film, Chisum.
- In the Shadow of Billy the Kid: Susan McSween and the Lincoln County War (2013) by Kathleen P. Chamberlain, a professor of history at Eastern Michigan University.
- Violence in Lincoln County 1869-1881, William A. Kelleher, University of New Mexico Press 1957
- McSween is mentioned in the 2019 semi-biographical novel of John Chisum's life, by Russ Brown, titled Miss Chisum.
- She is portrayed by Lisa Chandler in the 2022 series Billy the Kid.

== Bibliography ==
- Chamberlain, Kathleen P. (2013). In the Shadow of Billy the Kid: Susan McSween and the Lincoln County War. UNM Press. p. 297. ISBN 9780826352798.
