= The Left Handed Gun =

1958 film by Arthur Penn

- Theatrical release poster
- Directed by: Arthur Penn
- Screenplay by: Leslie Stevens
- Based on: "The Death of Billy the Kid" (1955 teleplay) by Gore Vidal
- Produced by: Fred Coe
- Starring: Paul Newman; Lita Milan; John Dehner; Hurd Hatfield
- Cinematography: J. Peverell Marley
- Edited by: Folmar Blangsted
- Music by: Alexander Courage
- Production company: Haroll Productions
- Distributed by: Warner Bros. Pictures
- Release date: May 7, 1958
- Running time: 102 minutes
- Country: United States
- Language: English

The Left Handed Gun is a 1958 American Western film directed by Arthur Penn, in his feature directorial debut, about outlaw Billy the Kid. It stars Paul Newman as Billy and John Dehner as Pat Garrett, along with Lita Milan and Hurd Hatfield. The film attempts to portray Billy the Kid as a misunderstood youth who got mixed up in a cattle war and was dragged down by the hostile population of New Mexico.

The film is based on Gore Vidal's 1955 teleplay "The Death of Billy the Kid", which aired on The Philco-Goodyear Television Playhouse, in which Newman also played the title character. Vidal revisited and revised the material for the 1989 TV movie titled Billy the Kid. The title refers to the belief that Billy the Kid was left handed, and he shoots left-handed in the film, though this was a false conclusion drawn from a reversed photograph.

The Left Handed Gun was released by Warner Bros. on May 7, 1958.

== Plot ==
Drifter William Bonney, known as "Billy The Kid", befriends a cattle boss named John Tunstall, who is known as "The Englishman". Tunstall is murdered by corrupt rival cattlemen led by the local sheriff in the Lincoln County War. Bonney plans to avenge the crime by hunting down those responsible and killing them in provoked gunfights. His violent actions endanger his surviving friends and the territorial amnesty proclaimed by New Mexico Territory governor Lew Wallace. Billy's former friend, Pat Garrett, becomes a sheriff and sets out to hunt him down.

Billy's worshipful companion, Moultrie, lionizes Billy's actions, fueling a series of dime novels that transform Bonney into a legend. Billy is disgusted with his fictionalization, and he rejects Moultrie. Embittered, Moultrie betrays Bonney to Garrett. In a final showdown, Garrett ambushes and kills the exhausted Bonney, who faces his nemesis unarmed in the hopes of ending his own life.

== Cast ==
Credits from the AFI Catalog of Feature Films.

- Paul Newman as Billy the Kid
- Lita Milan as Celsa
- John Dehner as Pat Garrett
- Hurd Hatfield as Moultrie
- James Congdon as Charlie Bowdre
- James Best as Tom Folliard
- Colin Keith-Johnston as John Tunstall
- John Dierkes as Alexander McSween
- Bob Anderson as Hill
- Wally Brown as Deputy Moon
- Ainslie Pryor as Joe Grant
- Martin Garralaga as Saval
- Denver Pyle as Ollinger
- Paul Smith as Smith
- Nestor Paiva as Pete Maxwell
- Jo Summers as Bride
- Robert Foulk as Sheriff William J. Brady
- Anne Barton as Mrs. Hill

== Reception ==
The film was a flop in the United States, but was praised by French film critics for its bold experimentation with the stereotyped American Western genre. Arthur Penn's direction received some praise, with Variety noting "shows himself in command of the medium, using motion picture technique and advantages...not available elsewhere, to their fullest value."

In 1961, it won the Grand Prix of the Belgian Film Critics Association.

== Comic book adaptation ==
- Dell Four Color #913 (July 1958)

== See also ==
- List of American films of 1958
