= George Peppin =

American sheriff in New Mexico (1841–1904)

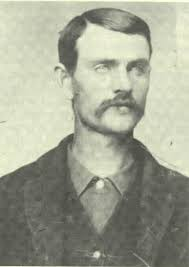
- Born: c. October 1841; Mountsville, Vermont
- Died: September 14, 1904; Lincoln County, New Mexico

George Peppin (c. October 1841 – September 14, 1904) was a corrupt sheriff in Lincoln County, New Mexico, who figured prominently into the Lincoln County War.

== Early life ==
Peppin was born at Mountsville, Vermont around October 1841, and later moved to California. He joined the Union Army as a part of the 5th Infantry California Volunteers in 1861.

He served with them until the end of the Civil War, mustering out in Mesilla, New Mexico having seen little to no combat action. He began working as a stone mason, and built many of the houses and structures of Lincoln, New Mexico.

== Murphy-Dolan association ==
Some time around 1874 Peppin became associated with James Dolan, a partner to Lawrence Murphy in a local mercantile and banking operation. By 1876, rancher and businessman John Tunstall had partnered with Alexander McSween to form a rival business, which developed into tensions between the Murphy-Dolan and Tunstall-McSween factions. By this time, Peppin was working as a Deputy Sheriff for Sheriff William J. Brady. The Sheriff's Office sided with the Murphy-Dolan faction, who soon after hired the Jessie Evans Gang and the John Kinney Gang as gunmen to harass the competition through cattle rustling. Tunstall hired Billy the Kid, Dick Brewer, Charlie Bowdre, Frank Coe, George Coe, Doc Scurlock and John Middleton to counter the hired guns employed by Murphy-Dolan.

== Lincoln County War ==
On February 18, 1878, John Tunstall was shot and killed, officially while resisting arrest, by Lincoln County Deputies William Morton, Jesse Evans, and Tom Hill.

The Lincoln County Regulators, led by Dick Brewer, were formed to bring to justice those involved in the Tunstall's death, and several were killed over the following months, to include the Regulator leader Dick Brewer, and with Buckshot Roberts, William Morton and Frank Baker being killed by the Regulators, and later Sheriff Brady himself along with Deputy George W. Hindman.

Peppin was present during the Sheriff Brady shootout, but was not wounded. Following Brady's death, John Copeland was appointed to the office of sheriff, but was dismissed shortly thereafter, allegedly due to his refusing to take the side of the Murphy-Dolan faction, and he was replaced by Peppin, whose loyalties were with Murphy-Dolan, and with his weak demeanor he was easily influenced by that faction.

Peppin continued to use deputized members of the Murphy-Dolan faction, include Jessie Evans, one of the Deputies who had slain Tunstall. He then led a campaign against the Regulators, resulting in the death of Regulator Frank McNabb and with Regulator Ab Saunders being seriously wounded during the gunfight at the Fritz Ranch.

Peppin then led a posse into Lincoln on July 15, 1878, to clash with the rest of the Regulators, assembled by Alexander McSween. In what would become known as the Battle of Lincoln, Peppin and his posse well outnumbered the besieged Regulators, and received assistance from the US Cavalry under the command of Colonel Nathan Dudley. That battle ended in a draw. McSween and his business partner Harvey Morris, along with Regulator Tom Cullin were killed, as were Peppin's men, "Dutch Charlie" Kruling, Bob Beckwith, and Charlie Crawford. Other Regulators escaped, and although the tensions continued for some time afterward, for all practical purposes the Lincoln County War ended there.

== Aftermath ==
Peppin lived in fear following the range wars end, resigning as sheriff immediately afterward, and begging for sanctuary at Fort Stanton, where for a time he worked as a butcher. He also worked as a butcher for rancher Pat Coghlan for a time during this period, before returning to work as a mason. He testified in the court of inquiry on behalf of Colonel Nathan Dudley, and later testified against Billy the Kid in the killing of Sheriff Brady. Peppin lived out the remainder of his life in solitude, dying on 14 September 1904 in Lincoln County.
