= Chisum =

1970 American Western film by Andrew V. McLaglen

- Theatrical release poster
- Directed by: Andrew V. McLaglen
- Written by: Andrew J. Fenady
- Produced by: Andrew J. Fenady
- Starring: John Wayne; Forrest Tucker; Christopher George; Ben Johnson; Bruce Cabot; Glenn Corbett; Patric Knowles; Andrew Prine; Richard Jaeckel; Lynda Day; Geoffrey Deuel; Pamela McMyler
- Cinematography: William H. Clothier
- Edited by: Robert L. Simpson
- Music by: Dominic Frontiere
- Production company: Batjac Productions
- Distributed by: Warner Bros.
- Release dates: June 24, 1970 (Premiere); July 29, 1970
- Running time: 111 min.
- Country: United States
- Language: English
- Budget: $4 million
- Box office: $6,000,000 (rentals)

Chisum is a 1970 American Western film directed by Andrew V. McLaglen, starring John Wayne in the title role, and adapted for the screen by Andrew J. Fenady from his short story "Chisum and the Lincoln County War". The supporting cast features Forrest Tucker, Christopher George, Ben Johnson, Glenn Corbett, Andrew Prine, Bruce Cabot, Patric Knowles, Richard Jaeckel, Lynda Day, Pedro Armendáriz Jr., John Agar, John Mitchum, Ray Teal, Christopher Mitchum, and Hank Worden, with Geoffrey Deuel and Pamela McMyler receiving "introducing" credits. The picture was filmed in Panavision and Technicolor.

Chisum is based on the Lincoln County War of 1878, and although it changed a number of details, many of the historical figures in the film (such as Chisum, Tunstall, McSween, Murphy, Brady, Evans, Garrett, and Billy the Kid) were in the New Mexico Territory at the time and did play a part in the conflict.

== Plot ==
In 1878, Lincoln County, New Mexico, John Chisum, a kindly and successful cattle baron, finds his peace threatened when amoral Lawrence Murphy and his business partner James Dolan forcibly buy up most of the land and businesses in the area. Initially, Chisum tries to not get involved, though he does allow ranchers forced out by Murphy to water their herds on his land.

Bribed by Murphy, corrupt Sheriff Brady secretly hires Neemo and his group of banditos, who kill two of Chisum's men and steal a herd of horses. Chisum and his men pursue the thieves, retrieve the horses, and discover the American money in the Mexican outlaw's pocket. They are assisted by Billy "the Kid" Bonney, a notorious killer, who was recently hired and given a chance to reform by John Henry Tunstall, Chisum's philanthropic British neighbor.

Chisum's niece Sallie arrives in Lincoln to live with her uncle, and Billy begins to court her. Alexander McSween, invited by Murphy to be his lawyer, arrives with his wife Sue on the same stagecoach. During Sallie's welcome party, Murphy sends Jess Evans and his gang to rustle Chisum's cattle, which are being taken to the United States Army to feed the Native Americans on a nearby reservation. A wandering Pat Garrett warns Chisum's men of the approaching riders; during the subsequent shootout, one of Chisum's wranglers dies and the cattle stampede away. Chisum sends for Justice J.B. Wilson to try Murphy's men for murder, but the damage is done and the Army starts buying its cattle from Murphy. McSween, not liking Murphy's methods, switches sides.

McSween, Tunstall, and Chisum open a new store and bank to combat Murphy's monopoly. Billy, Garrett, and several of Chisum's men go to Santa Fe to get supplies to stock the store. Billy is nearly killed when Murphy has Evans attack the wagon train as it is returning to Lincoln; in response, Tunstall decides to go to Santa Fe to ask Governor Axtell to intervene in the land war. Deputies Morton and Baker stop Tunstall on the road, falsely accuse him of rustling, shoot him dead, and plant a gun so it looks like Tunstall drew first.

Justice Wilson arrives in Lincoln during Tunstall's funeral. Brady refuses to go after his own men, so Wilson deputizes Chisum and Garrett, and they track and capture the fugitive deputies in a nearby town. On the way back, Chisum separates from the group to get the judge. Billy, wanting revenge for his friend and mentor, and skeptical that justice will be done in Lincoln, knocks out Garrett and kills Morton and Baker. He then rides into town, publicly murdering Brady before fleeing. Murphy convinces Governor Axtell to fire Justice Wilson and appoint bounty hunter Dan Nodeen, who harbors an old grudge against Billy, as sheriff.

While a large posse scours the countryside to find Billy, he gathers his allies, starting with two of Tunstall's wranglers, Charlie Bowdre and Tom O'Folliard. They break into McSween's store to get dynamite to rob Murphy's bank, but Nodeen notices them inside, and a protracted firefight breaks out between Murphy's and Billy's men. McSween, unarmed and wanting no part of the battle, asks that his wife and he be allowed to leave, but only Sue is allowed to go. When the shooting resumes, she flees to get Chisum, so Murphy has his men erect barricades in the streets of the town. McSween comes out to bargain with Murphy, and Nodeen shoots him in cold blood.

Chisum and his men arrive in Lincoln, driving Murphy's own cattle before them to break through the barricades. Murphy's men are defeated, with Billy personally pursuing and killing Evans. Chisum gets into a fistfight with Murphy, ending with both men falling from a balcony. Murphy is impaled on a decorative bull's horn he was using as a weapon; Nodeen, his paymaster dead, leaves town, pursued by Billy.

Garret and Sallie begin a relationship. He is appointed sheriff of Lincoln County, and the next governor of the territory, Lew Wallace, declares amnesty for those involved in the land war. With peace restored, Chisum goes up a hill to survey his land.

== Cast ==
- John Wayne as John Chisum
- Forrest Tucker as Lawrence Murphy
- Christopher George as Dan Nodeen
- Ben Johnson as James Pepper
- Glenn Corbett as Pat Garrett
- Andrew Prine as Alex McSween
- Bruce Cabot as Sheriff Brady
- Patric Knowles as Henry Tunstall
- Richard Jaeckel as Jess Evans
- Lynda Day as Sue McSween
- Geoffrey Deuel as Billy "The Kid" Bonney
- Pamela McMyler as Sallie Chisum
- John Agar as Amos Patton
- Lloyd Battista as Neemo
- Robert Donner as Morton
- Ray Teal as Justice J.B. Wilson
- Edward Faulkner as James Dolan
- Ron Soble as Charlie Bowdre
- John Mitchum as Baker
- Glenn Langan as Colonel Nathan Dudley
- Alan Baxter as Governor Samuel Beach Axtell
- Alberto Morin as Juan Delgado
- Bill Bryant as Jeff
- Pedro Armendáriz Jr. as Ben
- Christopher Mitchum as Tom O'Folliard
- John Pickard as Sergeant Braddock
- Abraham Sofaer as Chief White Buffalo
- Gregg Palmer as Karl Riker
- Hank Worden as Stationmaster Elwood
- Pedro Gonzalez Gonzalez as Mexican Rancher

== Production ==
The film was based on a screenplay by Andrew J. Fenady called Chisum and the Lincoln County Cattle War. Originally set up at 20th Century Fox, the project moved to Warner Bros.-Seven Arts in August 1969 because John Wayne wanted to make the film that year, but Fox's production schedule was full. Michael Wayne, John's son and the film's executive producer, took on the project of making Chisum because he felt the story summed up his father's political views. As is the case with many of Wayne's films, in this, his 200th starring role, the sizeable cast is packed with familiar faces from earlier John Wayne films, among them Sands of Iwo Jima (Wayne, John Agar, Forrest Tucker, and Richard Jaeckel).

The picturesque vistas in the film were captured by cinematographer William H. Clothier in Durango, Mexico, where the film was shot. John Wayne was on the set of Chisum when he heard he was nominated for the Academy Award for Best Actor for his work in True Grit, an award he would go on to win.

During filming, John Mitchum, brother of Robert, introduced John Wayne to his patriotic poetry. Seeing that Wayne was greatly moved by Mitchum's words, Forrest Tucker suggested Mitchum and Wayne should collaborate to record some of the poetry, which eventually resulted in the Grammy-nominated spoken-word album, America, Why I Love Her (1973).

The song "The Ballad of John Chisum", which is heard during the opening credits of the film, features verses spoken by William Conrad, while the song heard later in the film, "Turn Me Around", is sung by Merle Haggard.

== Box office and reception ==
The film premiered in Dallas, Texas, on June 24, 1970. It grossed $6 million at the box office.

U.S. President Richard Nixon commented on the film during a press conference in Denver, Colorado, on August 3, 1970. In doing so, he used the film as a context to explain his views on law and order:

Over the last weekend I saw a movie—I don't see too many movies but I try to see them on weekends when I am at the Western White House or in Florida—and the movie that I selected, or, as a matter of fact, my daughter Tricia selected it, was Chisum with John Wayne. It was a western. And as I looked at that movie, I said, "Well, it was a very good western, John Wayne is a very fine actor and it was: a fine supporting cast. But it was just basically another western, far better than average movies, better than average westerns."

I wondered why it is that the western survives year after year after year. A good western will outdraw some of the other subjects. Perhaps one of the reasons, in addition to the excitement, the gun play, and the rest, which perhaps is part of it but they can get that in other kinds of movies but one of the reasons is, perhaps, and this may be a square observation–is that the good guys come out ahead in the westerns; the bad guys lose.

In the end, as this movie particularly pointed out, even in the old West, the time before New Mexico was a state, there was a time when there was no law. But the law eventually came, and the law was important from the standpoint of not only prosecuting the guilty, but also seeing that those who were guilty had a proper trial.

Director Andrew V. McLaglen called the film one of his favorites and said: "I wanted Billy the Kid to just be Billy the Kid, a human being, not a bad little boy. Fenady was sort of a scholar about the Lincoln County Cattle War, which was a conflict over water and cattle—trading cattle—and John Chisum actually became a very powerful landowner. It was an American story."

== Home media ==
Warner Home Video released Chisum on Blu-ray on June 7, 2016.

== See also ==
- John Wayne filmography
- List of American films of 1970
