= John Chisum =

American businessman, rancher (1824–1884)

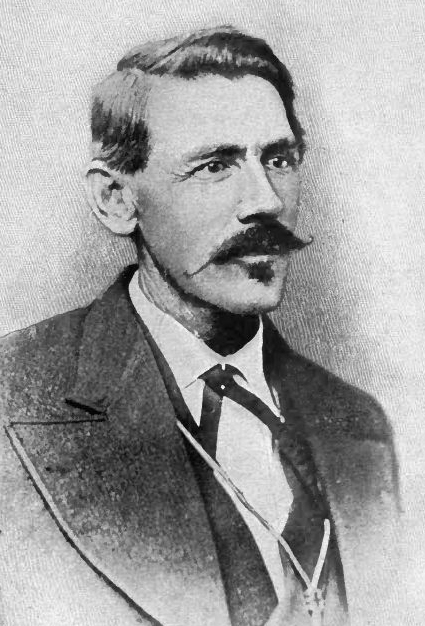
Portrait of John Simpson Chisum (1824–1884), taken from The Story of the Outlaw: A Study of the Western Desperado (1907)

John Simpson Chisum (August 15, 1824 – December 22, 1884) was a wealthy cattle baron on the frontier in the American West in the mid-to-late 19th century. As a rancher, he established large herds throughout the New Mexico territory, becoming known as the "Cattle King of the Pecos"; though his business ventures embroiled him in various conflicts, such as the Pecos War and the Lincoln County War. He is remembered as one of the most influential American cattlemen, and his name and life were remembered through memorials, books, films and shows.

== Early life ==
John Chisum was born in Hardeman County, Tennessee on August 15, 1824. In 1837, he moved with his family southwest across the Mississippi River to the newly independent Republic of Texas the year after the Texas Revolution, later finding work as a building contractor. He also served as a county clerk in Lamar County, Texas. He was of Scottish, English, and Welsh descent.

In 1854, Chisum became engaged in the cattle and ranching business and became one of the first to send his herds farther west from Texas to the newly established New Mexico Territory. He obtained land along the Pecos River by right of occupancy and eventually became the owner of a large ranch in the Bosque Grande region and Lincoln County, New Mexico, with a county seat and largest town of Lincoln, about forty miles south of the military post at Fort Sumner, with over 100,000 head of cattle.

In the years immediately after the American Civil War in 1866–1867, Chisum formed a partnership with cattlemen Charles Goodnight and Oliver Loving to assemble and drive herds of cattle for sale to the United States Army cavalry in Fort Sumner and farther north at the former longtime Royal Spanish colonial city, later then the Mexican provincial capital, becoming the new American territorial capital of Santa Fe. Chisum and his other ranching cattlemen partners also provided cattle to feed miners farther to the north in the Colorado Territory as well as provide cattle to the Bell Ranch in nearby Tucumcari, New Mexico.

== Feuds in New Mexico ==
Chisum staked his grazing territory alongside the Pecos River, releasing many cattle, which also got him in feud with various smaller ranchers and outlaws known as the Seven Rivers Warriors, as well as the Apache living at the Mescalero Apache Reservation. The range war, which lasted between 1876 to 1877, became known as the Pecos War. During the conflict, Chisum rode out together with his men to the house of the Beckwith family, laying siege to it, before falling back at the behest of his cowboys.

At the same time, he became an business associate of lawyer Alexander McSween. His employee and close friend, James Pepper, was also closely associated with him during this era. Together with John Tunstall, the alliance resulted in a multitude of businesses, such as the Lincoln County Bank. This and further actions resulted in Chisum becoming an opponent of a monopoly known as the "House", ruled by Santa Fe Ring members Lawrence Murphy and James Dolan.

The ensuing Lincoln County War lasted between 1878 to 1881, resulting in several men dead. When former Civil War general in the Union Army of Lew Wallace, took office as the newly appointed 11th Territorial Governor of New Mexico on October 1, 1878, he proclaimed an amnesty for all those involved in the bitter feud of the last several years in the central part of the Territory. When William H. Bonney, more famously later known as Billy the Kid surrendered to the authorities, he was told he would be charged with the shooting death of previous Lincoln County Sheriff William J. Brady, violating the earlier amnesty decree of Governor Wallace.

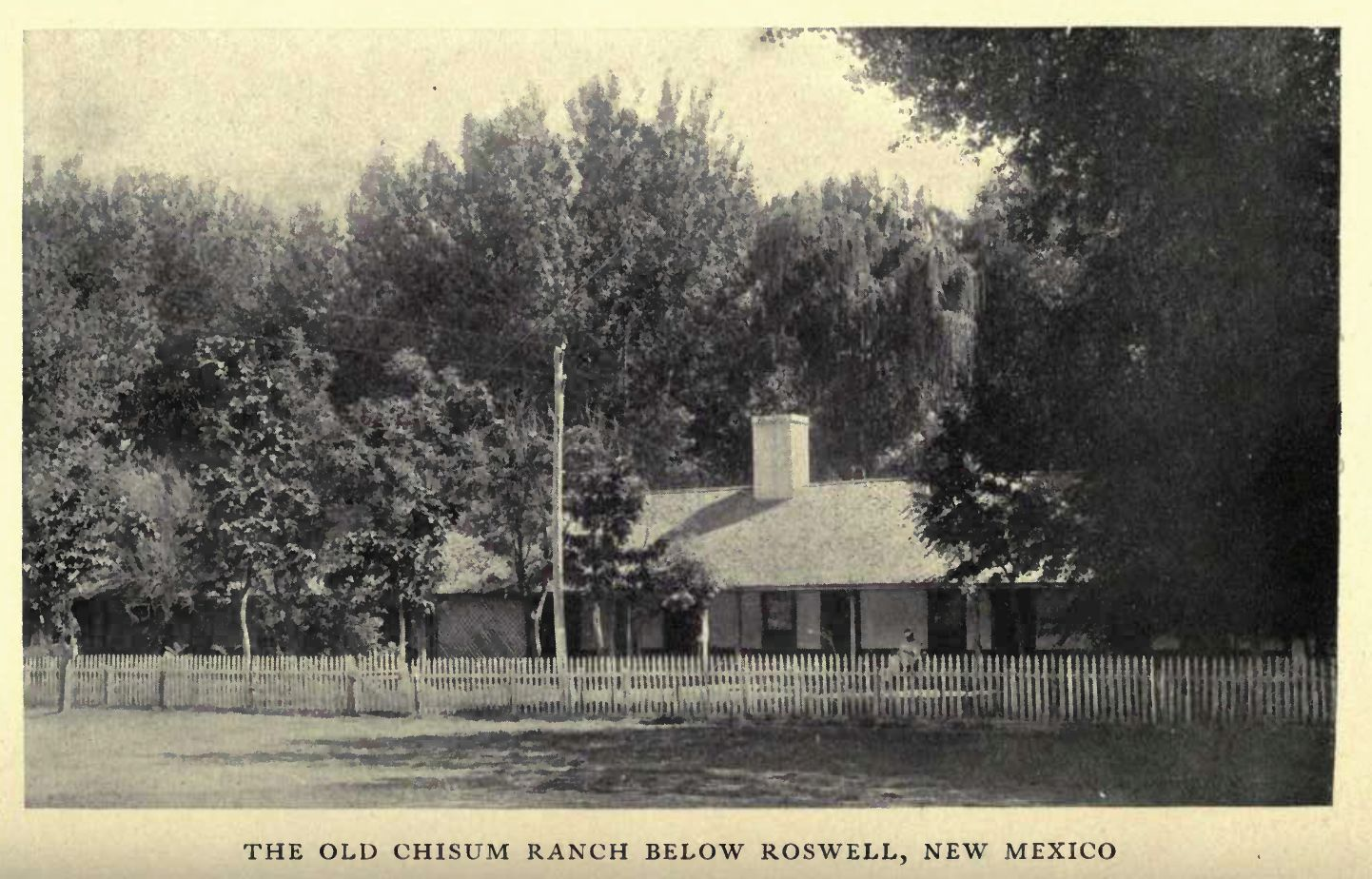
Chisum Ranch near Roswell, (Chaves County), to the east of Lincoln County, in the New Mexico Territory

Billy the Kid escaped from prison and went to see Chisum to collect a $500 debt. Chisum refused payment, claiming that he instead had given the Kid some horses, supplies, and protection over the years before. Bonney threatened then to steal $500 worth of cattle from Chisum to make up this disputed sum. The Kid's gang also stole from other local cattlemen and became a serious crime problem in Lincoln County. Ultimately, Chisum, with Pecos Valley rancher Joseph C. Lea, and James Dolan sought somebody capable of hunting down the Kid and either arresting or killing him. In 1880, they persuaded Pat Garrett, a former buffalo hunter and cowboy, to run for the office of Lincoln County Sheriff.

Garrett's specific task, if elected, was to apprehend Billy's gang, consisting then of Dave Rudabaugh, Billy Wilson, Tom O. Folliard, and Charlie Bowdre. In December 1880, Sheriff Garrett and his posse shot Folliard and Bowdre dead. By July 1881, Garrett finally tracked down and allegedly killed Billy the Kid.

== Death and legacy ==
Chisum died in Eureka Springs, Arkansas, on December 22, 1884, aged 60, due to complications from surgery to remove a growth from his jaw. He was unmarried and left his estate / ranches worth $500,000 to his brothers Pitzer and James. Chisum had an extended family living with him at the South Springs ranch in Roswell, and this family, along with hired help, often numbered two dozen at the main ranch headquarters. Chisum's niece Sallie Lucy Chisum, daughter of his brother James, became a beloved figure in the area, where she lived until 1934.

All of the land and properties had been sold by 1899 to pay off debts. Sallie kept a diary or journal that has acquired historical importance because of its references to events and people of New Mexico history such as the Lincoln County War of Billy the Kid and Pat Garrett, both of whom she knew. She and John Chisum are honored by statues to their memory in the towns of Artesia and Roswell, New Mexico. In 1958, he was inducted into the Hall of Great Westerners of the National Cowboy & Western Heritage Museum, in Oklahoma City, state capital of Oklahoma John Chisum fathered 2 daughters with his former freed slave mistress Jensie.

When Chisum moved west, he took Jensie and their two daughters to Bonham, Texas; bought them a house and left money to care for the girls. His eldest daughter Almeady "Meady" Chisum went on to marry Bob Jones, prominent rancher of Southlake, Texas. Among their grandchildren is Dr. William LaRue Jones, Professor Emeritus of Orchestral Studies at the University of Iowa's School of Music and current music director of the Ottumwa (Iowa) Symphony Orchestra.

== In popular culture and literature ==
The 1970 movie Chisum, starring John Wayne in the title role, along with Forrest Tucker, Ben Johnson, Christopher George, Bruce Cabot, Patric Knowles, Glen Corbett, Patricia McMyler, Andrew Prine, Lynda Day George, Richard Jaeckel, and Geoffrey Deuel portrayed some of the events of the Lincoln County War.

In the 1990 film Young Guns II, Chisum was portrayed by actor James Coburn. While only a brief appearance, the $500 debt became the crux of the main scene with Billy the Kid gunning down two of Chisum's hired gunmen. Chisum then later joined other businessmen in hiring Pat Garrett to hunt down Billy.

Chisum's life, from 1837 until his death in 1884, is detailed in a semi-biographical 2019 novel of historical fiction, by Russ Brown, centred on his relationship with the black woman and emancipated slave named Jensie, with whom he had children, titled Miss Chisum, subtitled "A Colorful 19th Century Texas Romance"

== See also ==
- Empire Ranch
