= Lincoln County War =

1878–1881 conflict in the Old West of the US

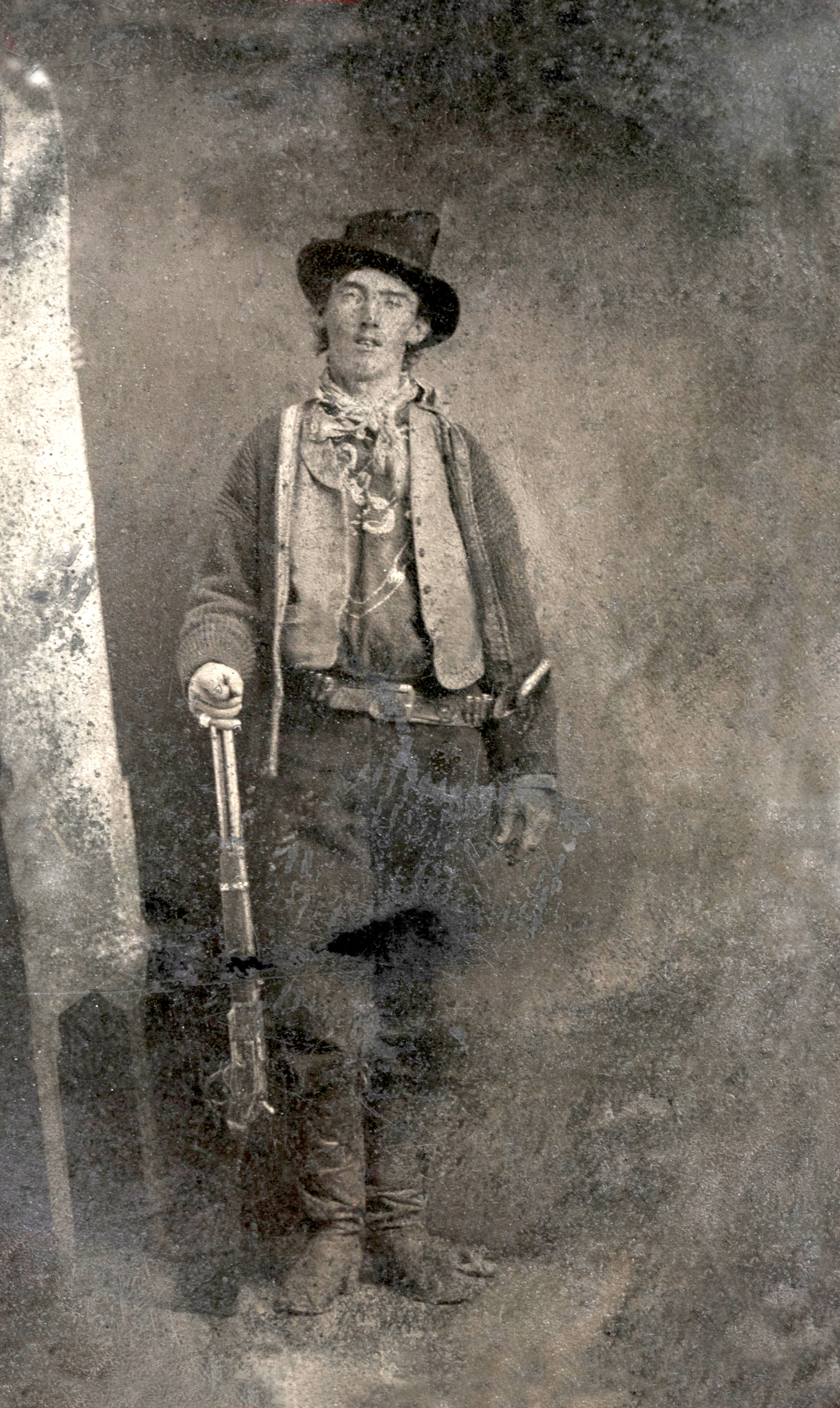
- Billy the Kid poses for a photo with his gun during the Lincoln County War.
- Date: February 18 – July 20, 1878 or July 14, 1881 (when Billy the Kid was killed)
- Location: Lincoln County, New Mexico Territory
- Caused by: Revenge killings
- Result: Regulators were suppressed and both factions collapsed

Parties
Murphy-Dolan-Riley Faction; General Store Monopoly; New Mexico lawmen; Jesse Evans Gang; Seven Rivers Warriors; John Kinney Gang	Tunstall-McSween-Chisum Faction; H. Tunstall & Co shop and bank; New Mexico lawmen (briefly); Lincoln County Regulators

Lead figures
Lawrence Murphy #; James Dolan; John Riley; William J. Brady †; George Peppin; Jesse Evans; Hugh Beckwith	John Tunstall †; John Chisum; Alexander McSween †; Dick Brewer †; Frank McNab †; Doc Scurlock; Billy the Kid †

Number
16	64

Casualties and losses
15 killed; 11 wounded	8 killed; 12 wounded

The Lincoln County War was an Old West conflict between rival cattle ranchers and business factions which began in 1878 in Lincoln County, New Mexico Territory, the predecessor of the state of New Mexico, and continued until 1881. The feud became famous because of the participation of William H. Bonney a.k.a. "Billy the Kid". Other notable participants included Lincoln County Sheriff William J. Brady, prominent cattle rancher John Chisum, lawyer and businessman Alexander McSween, James Dolan and Lawrence Murphy.

The conflict began between two factions competing for profits from dry goods and cattle interests in the county. The older, established faction was dominated by James Dolan, an Irish descendant, who operated a dry goods monopoly through a general store referred to locally as "The House". English-born John Tunstall and his business partner Alexander McSween opened a competing general store in 1876, with backing from established cattleman John Chisum. The two sides gathered lawmen, businessmen, Tunstall's ranch hands and criminal gangs to their assistance. The Dolan faction was allied with Lincoln County Sheriff Brady and aided by the Jesse Evans Gang. The Tunstall-McSween faction organized their own posse of armed men, known as the Lincoln County Regulators, and had their own lawmen consisting of Town of Lincoln's Town Constable Richard M. Brewer and Deputy U.S. Marshal Robert A. Widenmann.

The conflict was marked by revenge killings, starting with the murder of Tunstall by members of the Evans Gang. In revenge for this, the Regulators killed Sheriff Brady and others in a series of incidents. Further killings continued unabated for several months, climaxing in the Battle of Lincoln, a five-day gunfight and siege that resulted in the death of McSween and the scattering of the Regulators. Pat Garrett was named Lincoln County's new County Sheriff in 1880 as well as appointed as a Special Deputy U.S. Marshal and he hunted down Billy the Kid, killing Billy and two other former Regulators in the process.

The war was fictionalized by several Hollywood movies, including The Left Handed Gun in 1958, John Wayne’s Chisum in 1970, Sam Peckinpah's Pat Garrett and Billy the Kid in 1973 and Young Guns in 1988. Ron Hansen's novel The Kid (2016) and the television series Billy the Kid (2022–25) are also inspired by the Lincoln County War.

== Background ==
On November 1876, a wealthy Englishman named John Tunstall arrived in Lincoln County, New Mexico, where he intended to develop a cattle ranch, general store and bank in partnership with the young attorney Alexander McSween and cattleman John Chisum. At the time Lincoln County was dominated both economically and politically by Lawrence Murphy and James Dolan as the proprietors of LG Murphy and Co., later James J. Dolan and Co.; the only store in the county. The factions were divided along ethnic and sectarian lines, with the Murphy faction being mostly Irish Catholic, while Tunstall and his allies were mostly English Protestant. LG Murphy and Co. had lent thousands of dollars to the Territorial Governor and the Territorial Attorney General who eventually held the mortgage on the company.

Tunstall, McSween, and Chisum established a cattle business with the aim of supplying beef contracts in the New Mexico Territory. This venture further put them into conflict with Murphy and Dolan, who had already secured contracts to supply beef to both the Mescalero Apache Reservation and Fort Stanton. At that time, the latter's monopoly over the cattle industry was disliked by many farmers who were forced to pay high prices to them while selling their cattle for low prices. Some settlers, however, sided against Tunstall, McSween and Chisum, due to recent violent events that happened during the Pecos War. In fact, the Seven Rivers Warriors was a collective of smaller ranchers siding with Murphy and Dolan and had formed during the Pecos War to oppose Chisum, the owner of a large cattle ranch. Such aspects of the Lincoln County War qualified it as a range war in the eyes of historians like Emerson Hough. However, this is disputed by historians Francis and Roberta Fugate, who described it as competition over several other businesses more prominent than the minor cattle feud.

=== The Fritz insurance policy ===
The main event that resulted in the beginning of the Lincoln County War was controversy over the disbursement of Emil Fritz's insurance policy. Emil Fritz was a partner of L. G. Murphy. When he died in 1874, the executors of the estate hired Alexander McSween to collect his insurance policy. After collecting the policy, McSween refused to give the money to the executor of the estate because Murphy's The House general store claimed that the money was owed to them as a debt and McSween suspected that the executor of the estate would give the money to them. McSween also knew how badly in need of cash The House was and, as a business competitor, was likely loath to have the money go to them, whether their claim was legitimate or not.

During February 1878, in a court case that was eventually dismissed, they obtained a court order from a Lincoln County, New Mexico to seize all of McSween's assets. But, allegedly, mistakenly included all of Tunstall's assets with those of McSween. County Sheriff Brady was tasked with carrying out the court order. Brady formed a posse to attach Tunstall's remaining assets at his ranch 70 miles from the Town of Lincoln. Dolan also enlisted the John Kinney Gang, Seven Rivers Warriors and the Jesse Evans Gang, with their job mainly to harass and rustle cattle from Tunstall's and Chisum's ranches; as well as being the faction's hired gunmen.

== War ==
On February 18, 1878, members of the Sheriff's posse caught up to Tunstall while he and his ranch-hands, Richard M. Brewer a.k.a. Dick Brewer, Billy the Kid, John Middleton, Henry Newton Brown, Robert A. Widenmann, and Fred Waite were herding his last nine horses back to Lincoln. Frank Warner Angel, a Special Investigator for the Secretary of the Interior, later determined that Tunstall was shot in "cold blood" by Jesse Evans, William Morton, and Tom Hill. Tunstall's murder was witnessed from a distance by several of his men, including Richard Brewer and Billy the Kid. Tunstall's murder set off the Lincoln County War. Tunstall's cowhands and other local citizens formed a group known as the Regulators to avenge his murder, since the Territorial criminal justice system was controlled by allies of Murphy and Dolan. While the Regulators at various times consisted of dozens of American and Mexican cowboys, the main dozen or so members were known as the "iron clad"; including McCarty, Richard "Dick" Brewer, Frank McNab, Doc Scurlock, Jim French, John Middleton, George Coe, Frank Coe, Jose Chavez y Chavez, Charlie Bowdre, Tom O'Folliard, Fred Waite (a Chickasaw), and Henry Newton Brown.

The Regulators set out to apprehend the Sheriff's posse members who had murdered Tunstall. After the Regulators were deputized by the Lincoln County justice of the peace, together with Constable Martinez, they attempted to serve the legally issued arrest warrants on Tunstall's murderers. Sheriff Brady arrested and jailed Martinez and his deputies in defiance of their deputized status. They gained release and searched for Tunstall's murderers, finding Buck Morton, Dick Lloyd, and Frank Baker. Morton surrendered after a five-mile (8 km) running gunfight on the condition that he and his fellow Deputy Sheriff, Frank Baker, who had no part in the Tunstall murder but was riding with Morton and Lloyd, would be returned alive to Lincoln. The Regulators' captain Dick Brewer assured them they would be taken to Lincoln, but other Regulators insisted on killing the prisoners.

=== Blackwater massacre ===
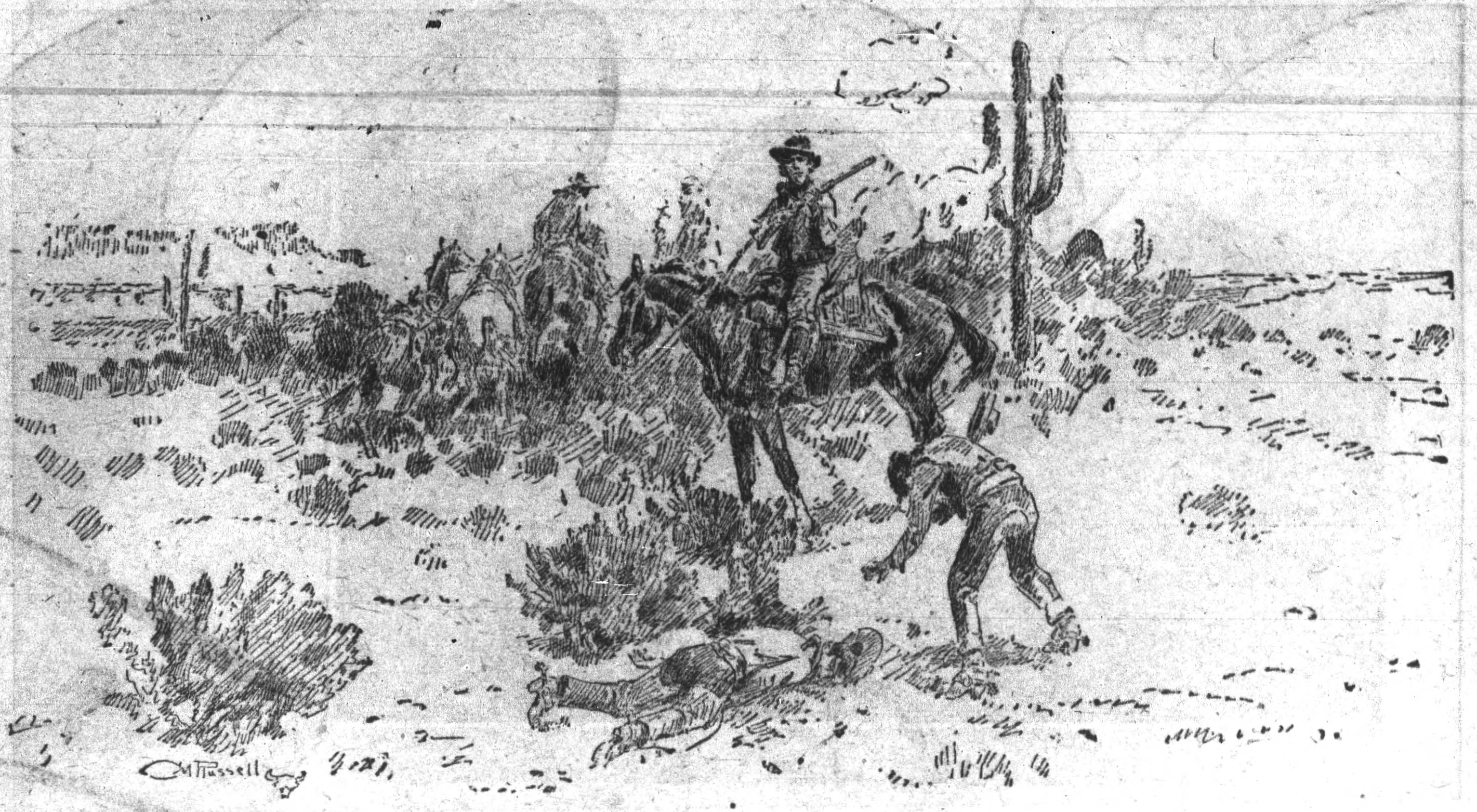
Blackwater massacre, art by Charles Russell.

On March 9, 1878, the third day of the journey back to Lincoln, the Regulators killed McCloskey, Morton, and Baker in the Capitan foothills along the Blackwater Creek. They claimed that Morton murdered McCloskey and tried to escape with Baker, forcing them to kill the two prisoners. Few believed the story, as they thought it unlikely that Morton would have killed his only friend in the group. As the bodies of Morton and Baker each bore eleven bullet holes, one for each Regulator, Utley believes that the Regulators murdered them and killed McCloskey for opposing them. Nolan writes that Morton took ten bullets, and Baker was shot five times. That same day, Tunstall's other two killers, Tom Hill and Jesse Evans, were shot while trying to rob a sheep drover near Tularosa, New Mexico. Hill died and Evans was severely wounded. While Evans was at Fort Stanton for medical treatment, he was arrested on an old federal warrant for stealing stock from an Indian Reservation.

=== Killing of William Brady ===
Sheriff Brady asked for assistance from the Territorial Attorney General Thomas Benton Catron to end this "anarchy". Catron referred the topic to the Territorial Governor Samuel B. Axtell. The Governor decreed that John Wilson, the Justice of the Peace, had been appointed illegally by the Lincoln County Commissioners. Wilson had deputized the Regulators and issued the warrants for Tunstall's murderers. Axtell's decree meant that the Regulators' actions, formerly considered legal, were now illegal. Axtell was also able to get Widenmann's status as a Deputy U.S. Marshal revoked, making Sheriff Brady and his men the only law enforcement officers in Lincoln County.

On April 1, 1878, the Regulators French, McNab, Middleton, Waite, Brown and McCarty (Billy the Kid) made ready in the corral behind Tunstall's store before attacking Brady and his Deputies on the main street of Lincoln. Brady died of at least a dozen gunshot wounds and his Deputy George W. Hindman was fatally shot as well. McCarty and French broke cover and dashed to Brady's body, possibly to get his arrest warrant for McSween or to recover McCarty's rifle, which Brady had kept from a prior arrest. A surviving Deputy, Billy Matthews, wounded both men with one bullet that passed through both of them. French's wound was so severe that he had to be temporarily harbored by Sam Corbet in a crawlspace in Corbet's house. Widenmann was also in the corral, but whether he participated was never ascertained: he claimed he was feeding Tunstall's dog.

=== Battle of Blazer's Mill ===
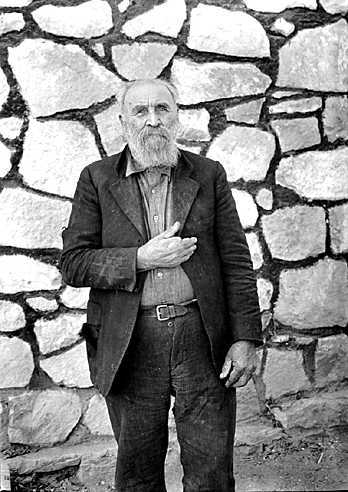
George W. Coe, survivor of the Blazer's Mill fight, in 1934

Three days after the murders of Brady and Hindman, the Regulators headed southwest from the area around Lincoln, reaching Blazer's Mill, a sawmill and trading post that supplied beef to the Mescalero Apaches. They came upon the rancher Buckshot Roberts, listed on their arrest warrant as one of Tunstall's murderers. Roberts met them outside, where Frank Coe, a neighbor of Roberts, tried to persuade him to surrender. But the latter refused due to fears of extrajudicial action from the Regulators. A gunfight ensued, with George Coe being wounded in the hand, while Roberts was hit in the stomach.

Roberts then retreated inside the mill and held his ground. The Regulators first attempted to rush Roberts, which only resulted with him knocking out Billy the Kid. Afterwards, they attempted to surround the house and fire from covered positions. Dick Brewer, who was shooting behind a log pile, was shot by Roberts in the eye, killing him. Several more Regulators were wounded. As the fight dragged on, the Regulators finally retreated, though Roberts died moments later from his wound.

=== Gunfight at Fritz Ranch ===
After Brewer's death, the Regulators elected McNab as their captain. On April 29, 1878, new Lincoln County Sheriff Peppin was directing a posse that included the Jesse Evans Gang and the Seven Rivers Warriors. They engaged in a shootout with the Regulators McNab, Saunders and Frank Coe at the Fritz Ranch. McNab died in the gunfire, Saunders was badly wounded and Frank Coe was captured.

The next day, the Seven Rivers members Tom Green, Charles Marshall, Jim Patterson and John Galvin were killed in Lincoln and, although the Regulators were blamed, this was never proven. Frank Coe escaped custody some time after his capture, allegedly with the assistance of Deputy Sheriff Wallace Olinger, who gave him a pistol.

The day after McNab's death the Regulators known as the "iron clad" assumed defensive positions in the Town of Lincoln, trading shots with Dolan's men and, allegedly, members of the U.S. Army Cavalry. "Dutch Charley" Kruling, a Dolan man, was wounded by rifle fire from George Coe. By allegedly shooting at U.S. government troops, the Regulators gained a new set of enemies. On May 15, the Regulators tracked down and captured the Jesse Evans gang member Manuel Segovia, who is believed to have shot McNab. They shot him during an alleged escape. Around the time of Segovia's death, the Regulator "iron clad" gained a new member, a young Texas cowboy named Tom O'Folliard, who soon became McCarty's best friend.

=== Battle of Lincoln ===
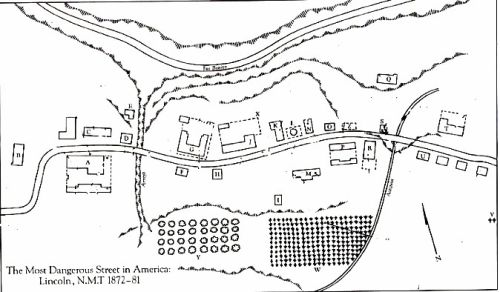
A map of Lincoln, New Mexico, as it appeared between 1872 and 1881

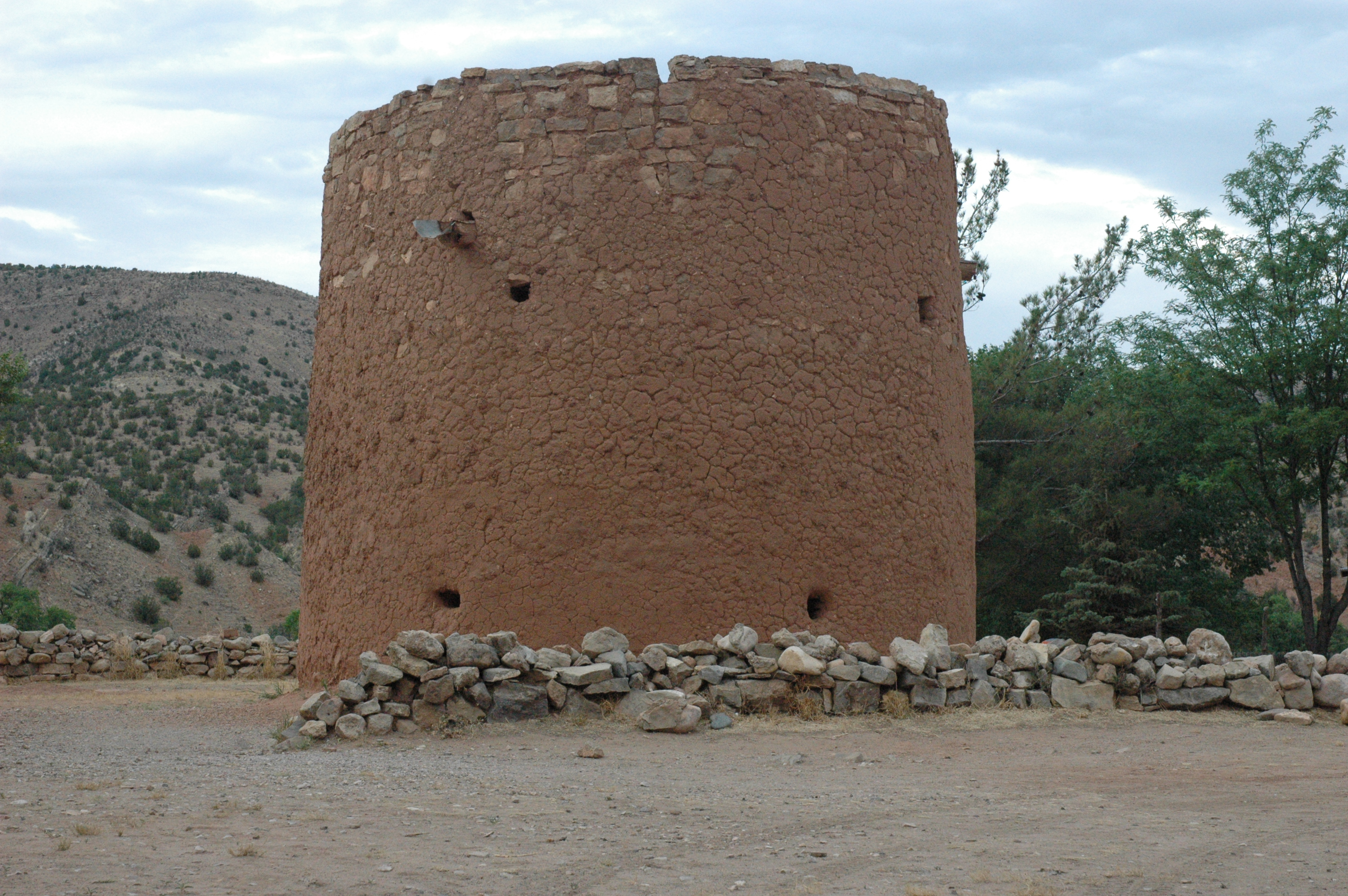
The Torreon, where Murphy's sharpshooters were stationed

A large confrontation between the two forces occurred on the afternoon of July 15, 1878, when the Regulators were surrounded in Lincoln in two different positions; the McSween house and the Ellis store. Opposing them were the Dolan/Murphy/Seven Rivers cowboys. In the Ellis store were Scurlock, Bowdre, Middleton, Frank Coe, and several others. About 20 Mexican Regulators, commanded by Josefita Chavez, were also positioned around town. In the McSween house were Alex McSween and his wife Susan, Billy the Kid, Henry Brown, Jim French, Tom O'Folliard, Jose Chavez y Chavez, George Coe, and a dozen Mexican vaqueros.

During the next three days, the men exchanged shots and shouts. Tom Cullens, one of the McSween house defenders, was killed by a stray bullet. Around this time, Henry Brown, George Coe, and Joe Smith left the McSween house and went to the Tunstall store, where they chased two Dolan men into an outhouse with rifle fire and forced them to dive into the bottom to escape. The impasse continued until the arrival of US Army troops commanded by Colonel Nathan Dudley. When these troops pointed cannons at the Ellis store and other positions, Billy the Kid, Doc Scurlock and his men, as did Chavez's cowboys, fled from their positions and barricaded themselves at the McSween house.

On the afternoon of July 19, the Murphy-Dolan faction set the house afire. As the flames spread and night began, Susan McSween and the other woman and five children were granted safe passage out of the house, while the men inside continued to fight the fire. By 9 pm, those left inside got set to flee out the back door of the burning house. Billy the Kid and Jim French assessed their situation, and figured out a way to escape by using pistol fire as cover and escaping. Jim French went out first, followed by Billy the Kid, O'Folliard, and Jose Chavez y Chavez. The Dolan men saw them running and began shooting, killing Harvey Morris, McSween's law partner. Some troopers moved into the back yard to take those left into custody when a close-quarters gunfight erupted. Alexander McSween and the Seven Rivers cowboy Bob Beckwith both died. Three other Mexican Regulators got away in the confusion, to rendezvous with the "iron clad" members yards away.

== Aftermath ==
The Lincoln County War accomplished little other than to foster distrust and animosity in the area. The surviving Regulators, most notably Billy the Kid, continued as fugitives. Gradually, his fellow gunmen scattered to their various fates. Billy rode with Bowdre, O'Folliard, Dave Rudabaugh and a few other friends, with whom he rustled cattle and committed other crimes. Eventually Lincoln County, New Mexico Sheriff and Special Deputy U.S. Marshal Pat Garrett and his posse tracked and killed O'Folliard, Bowdre, and, in July 1881, the "Kid". The three men were buried at Fort Sumner, New Mexico.

The Posse Comitatus Act, signed into law June 18, 1878, would have prevented the use of federal troops for domestic law enforcement, but President Hayes invoked the Insurrection Act of 1807 on October 7.

Murphy died of cancer on October 20, 1878, about the age of 47. Susan McSween hired attorney Huston Chapman to pursue charges against Dolan and others, in addition to working for amnesty for the Regulators. On February 18, 1879, one year to the day after Tunstall was murdered, Evans and Billy Campbell killed Chapman, then fled the territory. That murder also was attributed to Dolan, though his involvement was never proven. Dolan was indicted for the murder of Tunstall, but was acquitted. He later acquired all of Tunstall's property before dying on his ranch in 1898, aged 49. Susan McSween took over a large sum of land in the years after the Lincoln County War ended, establishing a ranch in Three Rivers, New Mexico. By the mid-1890s her ranch holdings were some of the largest in the territory. She averaged during this time between 3,000 and 5,000 head of cattle. She died a wealthy woman on January 3, 1931, aged 85.

== In popular culture ==
- Billy the Kid (1930)
- The Kid from Texas (1950)
- The Left Handed Gun (1958)
- Chisum (1970)
- Pat Garrett and Billy the Kid (1973)
- Young Guns (1988)
- Young Guns II (1990)
- Old Henry (film) (2021)
- Jury of Six, a novel by Matt Braun
- Miss Chisum, a novel by Russ Brown
- The Kid (2019)
- Billy the Kid (2022)

== See also ==
- Pecos War

== Bibliography ==
- Bean, Christopher. "The Colfax County War: Violence and Corruption in Territorial New Mexico by Corey Recko." Southwestern Historical Quarterly 128.2 (2024): 215-216.
- Caldwell, C. R. (2010). Dead Right: The Lincoln County War. Lulu.com. ISBN 9780615171524.
- Chamberlain, Kathleen (2013). In the Shadow of Billy the Kid: Susan McSween and the Lincoln County War. University of New Mexico Press. ISBN 978-0-8263-5279-8.
- Dickson, Brandon (October 2023). "The Posse That Killed John Tunstall: The story of what happened to them". The Tombstone Epitaph. CXXXXXIII (10). Tombstone, AZ: 1, 8–9, 13. ISSN 1940-221X.
- Haldane, Roberta Key. Gold-Mining Boomtown: People of White Oaks, Lincoln County, New Mexico Territory (University of Oklahoma Press, 2013) Double quote.
- Nolan, Frederick (2009) [1992]. The Lincoln County War: A Documentary History. Santa Fe, NM: Sunstone Press. ISBN 978-0-86534-721-2.
- Nolan, Frederick (1998). The West of Billy the Kid. Norman: University of Oklahoma Press. ISBN 0-8061-3082-2.
- Recko, Corey. The Colfax County War: Violence and Corruption in Territorial New Mexico (University of North Texas Press, 2024).
- Roberts, Calvin A.; Roberts, Susan A. (2004). A History of New Mexico. University of New Mexico Press. ISBN 978-0826335074.
- Utley, Robert M. (1987). High Noon in Lincoln: Violence on the Western Frontier. Albuquerque: University of New Mexico Press. ISBN 0-8263-1201-2.
- Utley, Robert M. (1989). Billy the Kid: A Short and Violent Life. University of Nebraska Press. ISBN 0-8032-9558-8.
- Wallis, Michael (2007). Billy the Kid: The Endless Ride. New York: W.W. Norton. ISBN 978-0-393-06068-3.
