= America, Why I Love Her =

1973 spoken word album by John Wayne

Studio album by John Wayne
- Released: March 1, 1973
- Genre: Poetry
- Label: RCA Victor
- Producer: Billy Liebert

America, Why I Love Her is an album of poetry recited by John Wayne. It was released on the RCA Victor label (LSP-4828) on March 1, 1973. It consists of patriotic poems written by actor John Mitchum, the brother of Robert Mitchum.

== Concept ==
The idea for the album came about when actor Forrest Tucker heard John Mitchum recite his poem "Why Are You Marching, Son?". Tucker and Mitchum were on location with Wayne, shooting the 1970 Western film Chisum. Tucker asked him to read it for Wayne, and halfway through the reading, Wayne had tears in his eyes. Wayne reportedly told Mitchum, "I've never recorded anything in my life, but I'm going to record an album of your poetry".

On the album, Wayne reads Mitchum's poetry with backing from an orchestra and choir. Billy Liebert arranged and conducted the orchestra and also produced the album.

In an interview upon the album's release, Wayne explained his attraction to the material: "John Mitchum thinks like I think and writes like I wish I could". Wayne added that he hoped that the album would cause "a little bit of rapport between everybody in our country".

== Critical reception ==
Mary Campbell of the Associated Press wrote that the album was "tastefully done, not over-produced, and the poems don't sound like the work of an amateur". She chose "My Roots Are Buried Here" as the album's best track.

In The Atlanta Constitution, Terry Kay wrote that Wayne's face on the album cover "has the toughness of Nevada seen from the air" and that the album "makes one want to snap to and salute". He recommended the album and noted that some would likely "snicker and giggle" over such things, but they would do so in private, as doing so publicly might offend someone, "and that could be dangerous".

For his performance on the album, Wayne was nominated in 1974 for the Grammy Award for Best Spoken Word Album.

== Chart performance ==
In its first two weeks of release, America, Why I Love Her sold more than 100,000 copies. It was on the pop album chart for 16 weeks and peaked at No. 66 on April 27, 1973.

The album fared even better on Billboard magazine's Hot Country Albums chart. It debuted on March 24, 1973, and peaked at No. 13.

== Further releases ==
The popularity of the album led to the release of both a single and a book.

Of the tracks included on the album, "The People" received the most airplay and was released as a single. Wayne cited "The People" and "Why I Love Her" as his favorite tracks. "The People" asserts that the greatness of America is found in its people and provides examples of such greatness, including Sandy Koufax staring down a batter, Fred Astaire dancing on gossamer wings, Billy Graham bringing God to millions, and Mahalia Jackson closing her eyes in devotion.

In 1977, a follow-up book with the same title was published by Simon and Schuster. The book included photographs and text, as well as the words and music from the album.

The album was re-released when Wayne died in 1979. After the September 11 attacks, the album was re-released on compact disc.

== Track listing ==
Side A

1. "Why I Love Her" [2:56]
2. "The Hyphen" [2:29]
3. "Mis Raices Estan Aqui (My Roots Are Buried Here)" [2:41]
4. "The People" [3:46]
5. "An American Boy Grows Up" [4:29]

Side B

1. "Face the Flag" [3:52]
2. "The Good Things" [2:40]
3. "The Pledge of Allegiance" [4:19]
4. "Why Are You Marching, Son?" [3:58]
5. "Taps" [3:01]
