= Alexander McSween =

American Old West figure (1837–1878)

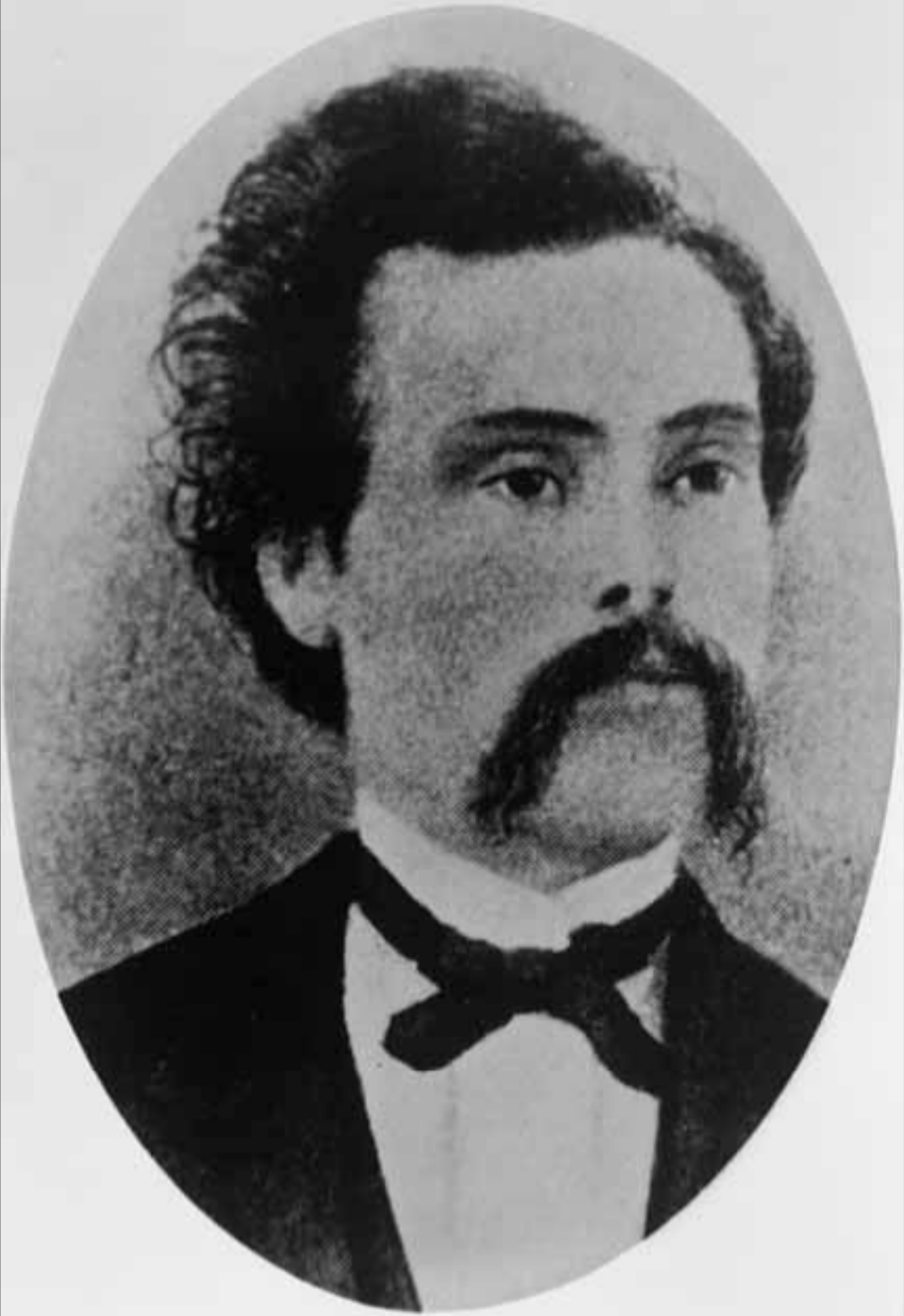
- McSween c. 1875-1876
- Born: June 15, 1837; Canada
- Died: July 19, 1878 (aged 41); Lincoln, New Mexico, U.S.
- Occupation: Lawyer
- Known for: Death in Battle of Lincoln
- Spouse: Susan McSween (m. 1873)

Alexander McSween (June 15, 1837 — July 19, 1878) was a prominent figure during the Lincoln County War of the Old West, and a central character, alongside John Tunstall, in opposing businessmen and gunmen Lawrence Murphy and James Dolan.

== Early life ==
Of Scottish descent, Alexander Anderson McSween was born on June 15, 1837, in Canada, in either Nova Scotia or Prince Edward Island. His widow later claimed that in his youth McSween was a Presbyterian preacher. According to Robert Utley, however, McSween's name does not appear in the records of any Presbyterian seminary or list of ministers.

Afterwards McSween attended law school for one year, in St. Louis, Missouri, before moving to Kansas, then to New Mexico Territory. He married Susan Hummer on August 23, 1873, in Atchison, Kansas, and they settled in Eureka, Kansas. In 1875, the couple moved to Lincoln, New Mexico, where her husband had accepted a job as a lawyer for the mercantile company and bank of Irish Catholic immigrants Lawrence Murphy and James Dolan.

After he arrived in Lincoln County, New Mexico, however, McSween left Dolan and Murphy to work for English rancher and businessman John Tunstall, with whom he became close friends and, by 1876, business partners.

== Lincoln County War ==
When the trouble between the two factions began, Murphy-Dolan accused McSween of embezzlement, and they hired gunmen from the Evans and Kinney gangs to rustle Tunstall's cattle and harass him.

In response, McSween and Tunstall prepared for war and hired a gang of cowboys called the Lincoln County Regulators to protect them and their properties. The Regulators included Billy the Kid, Dick Brewer, George Coe, and Frank Coe, and others.

On February 18, 1878, Tunstall was shot and killed, officially while resisting arrest, by Lincoln County Deputies William Morton, Jesse Evans, and Tom Hill.

Soon after, McSween arranged for the Regulators to be sworn in as special Constables by the Lincoln County Justice of the Peace, who had long been allied to him and to Tunstall. On March 6, 1878, the Regulators arrested Frank Baker and Deputy William Morton, and subjected them both to summary execution

On April 1, 1878, Billy the Kid, Jim French, Frank McNab, John Middleton, Fred Waite, Henry Brown, entered Lincoln and ambushed and murdered Lincoln County Sheriff William Brady and Deputy George Hindman.

According to historian Robert Marshall Utley, the assassination of Sheriff Brady had been ordered by Alexander McSween, who knew that the Sheriff was carrying an arrest warrant for him. For this reason, Billy the Kid ran from the place of ambush in order to remove the arrest warrant from the Sheriff's pocket. Instead, the Kid was driven back and slightly wounded, by the gunfire of Deputy William Matthews.

On April 4, 1878, there was a gun battle at Blazer's Mill between Buckshot Roberts, a bounty hunter working for the Murphy-Dolan faction, and the Regulators. Both Roberts and Regulator Dick Brewer were killed, Middleton was badly wounded, the Kid was grazed by a bullet, and George Coe had his trigger finger shot off.

On April 18, 1878, Billy the Kid, John Middleton, Fred Waite and Henry Newton Brown were indicted for the murder of Sheriff Brady. On the same day, Dolan, Deputy Jesse Evans, Deputy William Matthews and others were indicted for the murder of John Tunstall. On May 15, 1878, Manuel Segovia, the cowboy who had killed Frank McNab, was captured.

== Battle of Lincoln ==
On July 15, 1878, the Regulators were surrounded in Lincoln at the McSween home, along with McSween and his law partner, Harvey Morris. Facing them were the Dolan/Murphy/Seven Rivers cowboys, led by Sheriff George Peppin. On July 19, after numerous exchanges of gunfire over a four-day period, the house was set afire. As the flames spread and night fell, Susan McSween was granted safe passage out of the house while the men inside continued to fight the fire.

By 9 p.m., the Regulators and McSween made plans to break free of the house. Jim French went out first, followed by Billy the Kid, Tom O'Folliard, and Jose Chavez y Chavez. The Dolan gang saw the running men and opened fire, killing Morris. Some US Cavalry troopers had arrived by that time with instructions to make arrests to avoid murders by the Dolan Faction. The soldiers had moved into positions in the back yard to take those left into custody. However, a close-order gunfight erupted. McSween, whose white shirt made him an easy target, was killed, as was Seven Rivers cowboy Bob Beckwith.

== Legacy ==
With McSween dead, the Lincoln County War was effectively over. His widow, Susan McSween, remarried some time later, to a businessman named George Barber, but that marriage ended in divorce. Susan would later purchase a ranch in Three Rivers, New Mexico, to become one of the most prominent cattlewomen of the Old West. In 1902, politician Albert Fall acquired the ranch and Susan moved to White Oaks, New Mexico, where she remained until her death in January 1931, at age 85.

== In popular culture and media ==
The 1970 movie Chisum, starring John Wayne in the title role, portrayed some of the events in which McSween was involved, with Andrew Prine playing McSween.

McSween was portrayed by Terry O'Quinn in the 1988 movie Young Guns. Unlike with many other actual characters depicted in this movie and its sequel, McSween's death was portrayed more or less accurately, with a scene showing him shot and killed in the Battle of Lincoln.

McSween is mentioned in the 2019 semi-biographical novel of John Chisum's life, by Russ Brown, titled Miss Chisum.
