= William J. Brady =

New Mexico sheriff (1825–1878)

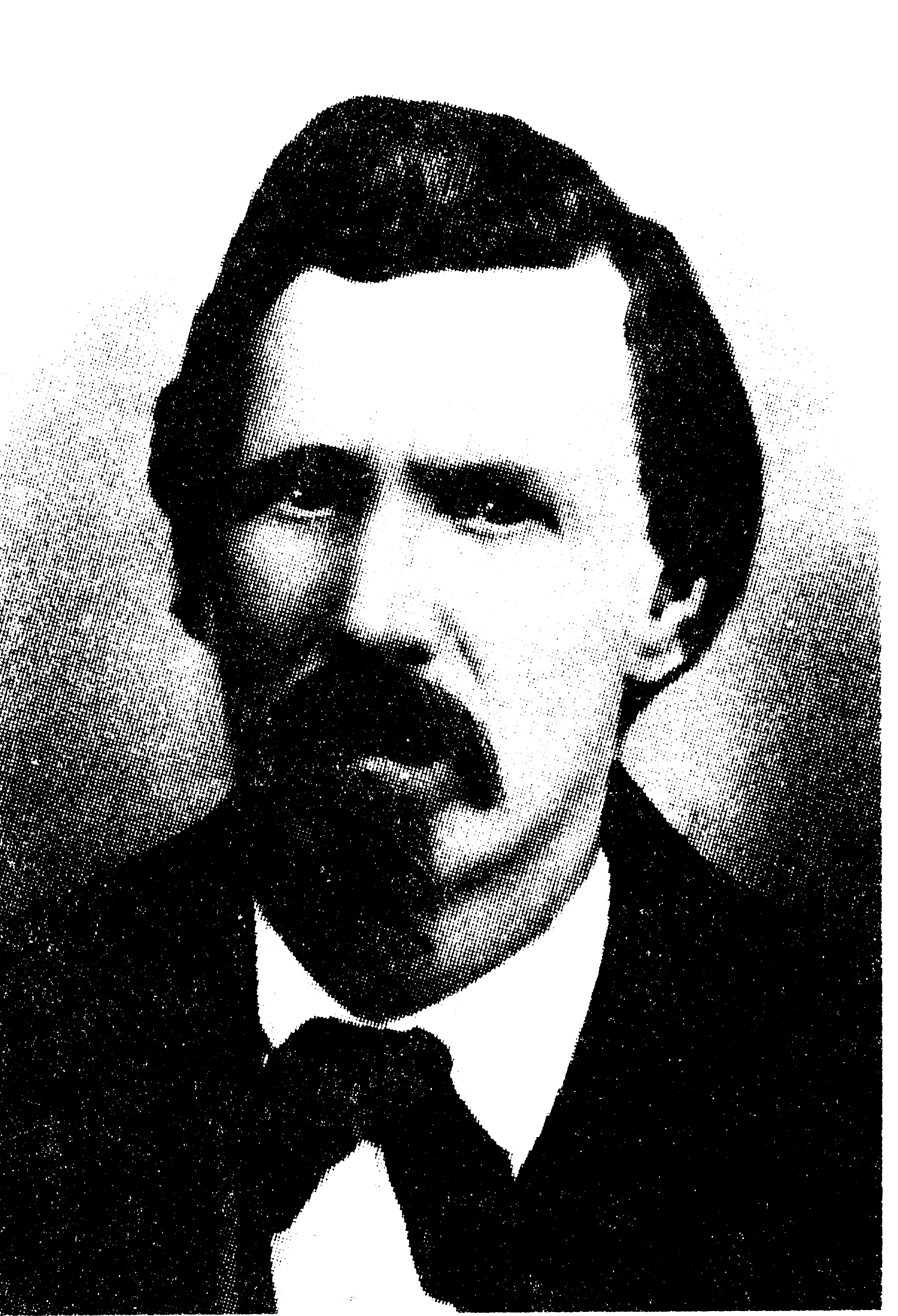
- Brady in 1872, Territorial Legislature photograph
- Born: August 16, 1829; County Cavan, Ireland
- Died: April 1, 1878 (aged 48); Lincoln, New Mexico Territory, U.S.
- Cause of death: Gunshot wound
- Occupations: Lawman, soldier, politician
- Years active: 1851–1878
- Known for: Lincoln County War

William J. Brady (August 16, 1829 – April 1, 1878) was an Irish-born American soldier, politician, and former stationed head of fort stanton in Fort Stanton NM law enforcement officer who served as the sheriff of Lincoln County during the Lincoln County Wars in New Mexico, United States. He was murdered in an ambush, aged 48, by the Lincoln County Regulators and Billy the Kid.

== Early life ==
William J. Brady was born in the parish of Urney and Annagelliffe just north of the town of Cavan, County Cavan, Ireland, on August 16, 1829. He was baptized into the Catholic Church in Ireland that same day.

Brady's parents, John Brady and Catherine Darby, were Irish Catholic tenant farmers, and rented a seven-acre potato farm from a local Anglo-Irish landlord. William was the firstborn of an eventual eight children. He attended the newly opened National school and graduated in 1844. As the eldest son, William was trained to take over the family's rented plot of land.

After the death of his father in 1846, he took over as head of the family and worked very hard to keep his mother and siblings alive during the Great Famine. Brady and his widowed mother attended the Cavan Tenant-Rights Meeting in July 1850, and both signed a petition demanding that the House of Commons change the laws regarding tenant farming in Ireland. In the summer of 1851, Brady left Ireland for the United States.

== Military service ==
=== Frontier Soldier ===
Soon after his arrival in New York in July 1851, Brady enlisted in the U.S. Army. Military records reveal Brady to have been five feet eight inches tall, with brown hair, blue eyes, and a fair complexion. He gave his occupation as a farmer from Cavan, Ireland. Brady was assigned to Company F, First Regiment Mounted Rifles, under the overall command of Colonel William Wing Loring. He spent the next five years stationed at Fort McIntosh, near San Antonio, Texas, where he was promoted to the rank of Sergeant. Upon his reenlistment in 1856, Brady's commanding officer, Captain Andrew Porter, praised him as, "A faithful and excellent soldier and honest and sober man." Sgt. Brady was transferred to Fort Craig, New Mexico, where he served in combat against both the Apache and the Navajo.

In 1859, Sgt. Brady was assigned to the garrison at Fort Union, which was vulnerable to attacks by the Comanche and Kiowa. Upon arrival there, however, Brady led several patrols that helped map the area, but did not encounter either tribe or experience combat.

In January 1861, as the outbreak of the American Civil War grew increasingly imminent, Colonel Andrew Porter, Sgt. Brady, and the majority of the Fort Union garrison were transferred to Fort Craig, in order to defend New Mexico Territory from invasion by Texas-based units of the Confederate Army.

Brady's term of enlistment expired and he was honorably discharged at Fort Craig on March 2, 1861. In Brady's file, Colonel Porter wrote, "Excellent: a brave man and an honest and gallant soldier. He has enjoyed this character during two enlistments in my company."

=== Civil War ===
Although Brady had repeatedly offered to serve as a commissioned officer for the Union Army in the East, Brady was informed that the Southwest needed defending, too. For this reason, Brady enrolled in the 2nd New Mexico Infantry Regiment at Albuquerque on August 19, 1861. He was later promoted to 1st Lieutenant by Governor Henry Connelly under General Orders from the War Department. After three weeks of recruiting and training, Brady and his regiment were assigned to garrison and defend Fort Craig against potential Confederate attack.

He fought against the Confederate Army at the Battle of Glorieta Pass and stayed with his unit when it was incorporated into the 1st Regiment New Mexico Volunteer Cavalry.

After the Confederate troops left New Mexico, he was assigned as a recruiting officer in Polvadera, New Mexico.

The following year Brady was assigned as the acting commander at Fort Stanton, and in 1864 was confirmed as commandant there. He led several successful campaigns against the Navajo and Apaches. During his term as commandant of Fort Stanton, Brady's repeated complaints to the Quartermaster Department about the failure of necessary supplies to arrive ultimately exposed war profiteering by Captain G.D. Morton and Federal Indian Agent Lorenzo Labadie, who had been diverting beef, food, and clothing supplies intended for New Mexico military posts for personal gain.

He served as commandant at several other New Mexico forts until his discharge in October 1866 at the brevet rank of Major.

== Personal life ==
In 1862, while assigned to Albuquerque by the U.S. Army, Lt. Brady became engaged to María Bonifacia Chávez, a Mexican-American woman from Corrales. The previous husband of María Bonifacia Chávez, a teamster and civilian employee of the U.S. Army named Juan Montoya, had disappeared along with their son while delivering military supplies and was later ruled by military investigators to have been killed by the Indians. In a 11 July 1892 request for her late husband's military pension, María Bonifacia alleged that her wedding to Lt. Brady took place in Albuquerque on 16 November 1862. As of 1986, however, searches by local historians in both Roman Catholic, military, and civil marriage records had been unable to confirm Mrs. Brady's claims. In 1862, New Mexico did not have mandatory marriage registration, which only became the law the following year. NM Laws 1862–63, pg. 64. However, New Mexico did not recognize common law marriage.

Brady and his wife and children settled on a ranch on the Río Bonito, four miles east of Lincoln, New Mexico.

== Lincoln County ==
He was first elected Sheriff of Lincoln County on September 6, 1869, and took office in January 1870.

In 1871, Brady was elected as the first representative from Lincoln County to sit in the Territorial Legislature. He lost his seat in the next election. In 1876 he was elected again as sheriff.

Although Lincoln sheriffs had tried for eight years to get money from the county for a jail, Brady finally got funds ($3,000) to build an underground holding area in 1877.

Prior to that, the sheriff used the military jail at Fort Stanton. The new jail was twenty feet wide by thirty feet long, and ten feet deep. It was lined with rough logs and divided into two cells with a ladder and a trap door for access. Light, when available, was by candles.

Conditions were so bad and escapes so common that the county anted up for a real jail in 1880. One of the causes was the successful escape in November 1877 by the Jesse Evans Gang.

== Lincoln County War ==
Brady sided with the Murphy-Dolan faction in the Lincoln County War and was personally involved in Tunstall's murder. Lawrence Murphy owned the mercantile (the dry goods store) and bank in Lincoln, and Sheriff Brady owed him money. This put him up against John Tunstall, Alexander McSween, Billy the Kid, and the Regulators.

In the Spring of 1877, Brady was beaten up by two bravados, believed to be John Tunstall’s cowboys, in the middle of the main street of Lincoln. But their identity was never confirmed. People speculated that they worked for Tunstall.

On April 1, 1878, Regulators Jim French, Frank McNab, John Middleton, Fred Waite, Henry Newton Brown and Billy the Kid ambushed Brady and four of his deputies on the main street of Lincoln as reprisal for Tunstall's murder. They fired on the five men from behind an adobe wall. Brady, aged 48, died of at least a dozen gunshot wounds. Deputy George W. Hindman was hit twice, fatally.

Once the shooting stopped, Billy the Kid and Fred Waite broke cover and dashed to Brady's corpse, Waite to take Brady's rifle and Billy to retrieve a pearl-handled revolver which Brady had kept. A surviving deputy, Billy Matthews, wounded both men with a rifle bullet that passed through the flesh of Billy's right thigh but shattered the leg of Waite. They still managed to escape, though Waite was laid up for a few days following.

Brady was first replaced by John Copeland as sheriff. Copeland refused to take sides in the conflict. Dolan used his influence to have him replaced by George Peppin.

It was for the murder of Brady that Billy the Kid was convicted by a territorial court in April 1881, and sentenced to death, a conviction that led to his famous escape from the Lincoln County jail and his subsequent killing by Sheriff Pat Garrett.

== Cultural depictions ==
- Brady was portrayed by Bruce Cabot in the film Chisum (1970).
- Brady was portrayed by Danny Kamin in the film Young Guns (1988).
- Brady was portrayed by Bill MacDonald in the TV Series Billy The Kid (2022).

== Sources ==
- Ball, Larry D. (1992). Desert Lawmen: the high sheriffs of New Mexico and Arizona, 1846–1912. Albuquerque, New Mexico: University of New Mexico Press. ISBN 978-0-8263-1346-1.
- Lavash, Donald R. (1986). Sheriff William Brady: Tragic Hero of the Lincoln County War. Santa Fe, New Mexico: Sunstone Press. ISBN 978-0-86534-064-0.

Police appointments
Preceded by Mauricio Sanchez	Sheriff of Lincoln County, New Mexico; 1870–1872	Succeeded by Lewis G. Gylam
Preceded by Saturnino Baca	Sheriff of Lincoln County, New Mexico; 1877–1878	Succeeded by John Copeland
