= Nathan Dudley =

Union Army officer (1825–1910)

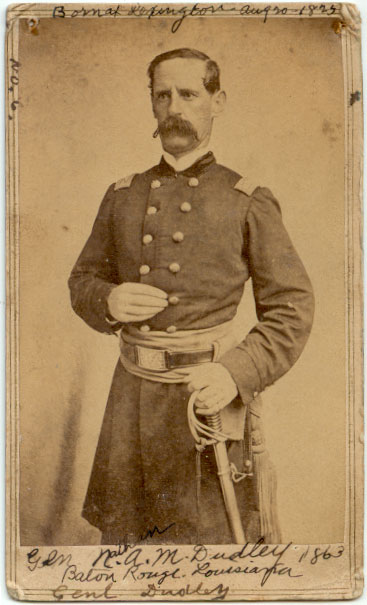
- Nathan Dudley in 1863
- Born: Nathan Augustus Monroe Dudley; August 20, 1825
- Died: April 29, 1910 (aged 84)
- Buried: Arlington National Cemetery
- Allegiance: Union Army
- Service years: 1861–1904
- Rank: Colonel and Brigadier general
- Conflicts: American Civil War

Nathan Augustus Monroe Dudley (August 20, 1825 – April 29, 1910) was a soldier who served as a colonel of Volunteers and sometimes as an acting brigadier general of Volunteers for the Union Army during the American Civil War. He later served in the New Mexico Territory.

== Early military career ==
Dudley led the 30th Massachusetts Volunteers and spent time as an aide to Nathaniel Prentice Banks, Major General of Volunteers and commander of the XIX Corps. At the beginning of the War he was serving as a regular army captain, commanding Company E of the 10th U.S. Infantry Regiment. On January 19, 1865, President Abraham Lincoln nominated Dudley for the award of the honorary grade of brevet brigadier general of volunteers to rank from the same date, January 19, 1865, and the U.S. Senate confirmed the award on February 14, 1865. After the war he reverted to his regular rank and transferred to the Third U. S. Cavalry. He eventually was promoted to Lt. Colonel of the Ninth Cavalry and finally to Colonel of the First U. S. Cavalry. He spent much of his career on the Indian frontier and performed well in his duties, which has been somewhat overshadowed by his part in the Lincoln County War. He was well-liked by his men but often not so well-liked by his fellow officers. He was convicted at two Courts-Martial of offenses that could have ended his career, and Colonel Hatch of the Ninth Cavalry tried to get Dudley retired as being unfit for service due to alcohol.

== Lincoln County War ==
Dudley's part in the Lincoln County War of 1877–1879 in New Mexico Territory is at best controversial and at worst despicable and incompetent. He was the commanding officer of the local Fort Stanton. Despite orders not to interfere in civilian matters, he did, nominally to protect civilians, but in fact, he seems to have favored the Murphy-Dolan faction throughout the range war. Attempts to have him removed as commander went all the way to the Secretary of War, but were refused. Susan McSween, the wife of one of the key participants, Alexander McSween, had charges filed in 1879 against Dudley.

Dudley was removed by General Hatch as commander on March 7, 1879, and a court of inquiry into his actions was commissioned. In July 1879, the inquiry ruled that a court martial against Dudley was not justified, and Dudley was transferred to Fort Union, also in New Mexico Territory. In November 1879 Dudley was also found not guilty in his trial for an arson, a crime committed during the Battle of Lincoln. Susan McSween's husband, Alexander, was shot and killed while unarmed, and in the presence of Col. Dudley, while McSween was fleeing the burning house. He was disgraced and never to serve in a position of command again.

== Subsequent career ==
Towards the end of his career, he assisted Colonel George Buell's expedition against the Apache chief Victorio, which indirectly led to Victorio's death at the hands of the Mexican army. In 1887, as a colonel of the 1st Cavalry, he helped suppress the rebellion on the Crow reservation, during which the leader of a faction of the Crow, Sword Bearer, was killed. Promoted in 1904, during his retirement, to regular army brigadier general, Dudley died in 1910, aged 84, and was interred in Arlington National Cemetery under an ornate tombstone of his own design.

== See also ==
- List of Massachusetts generals in the American Civil War
- Massachusetts in the American Civil War
