= Lincoln, New Mexico =

Unincorporated community in Lincoln County, New Mexico, United States

- Unincorporated community
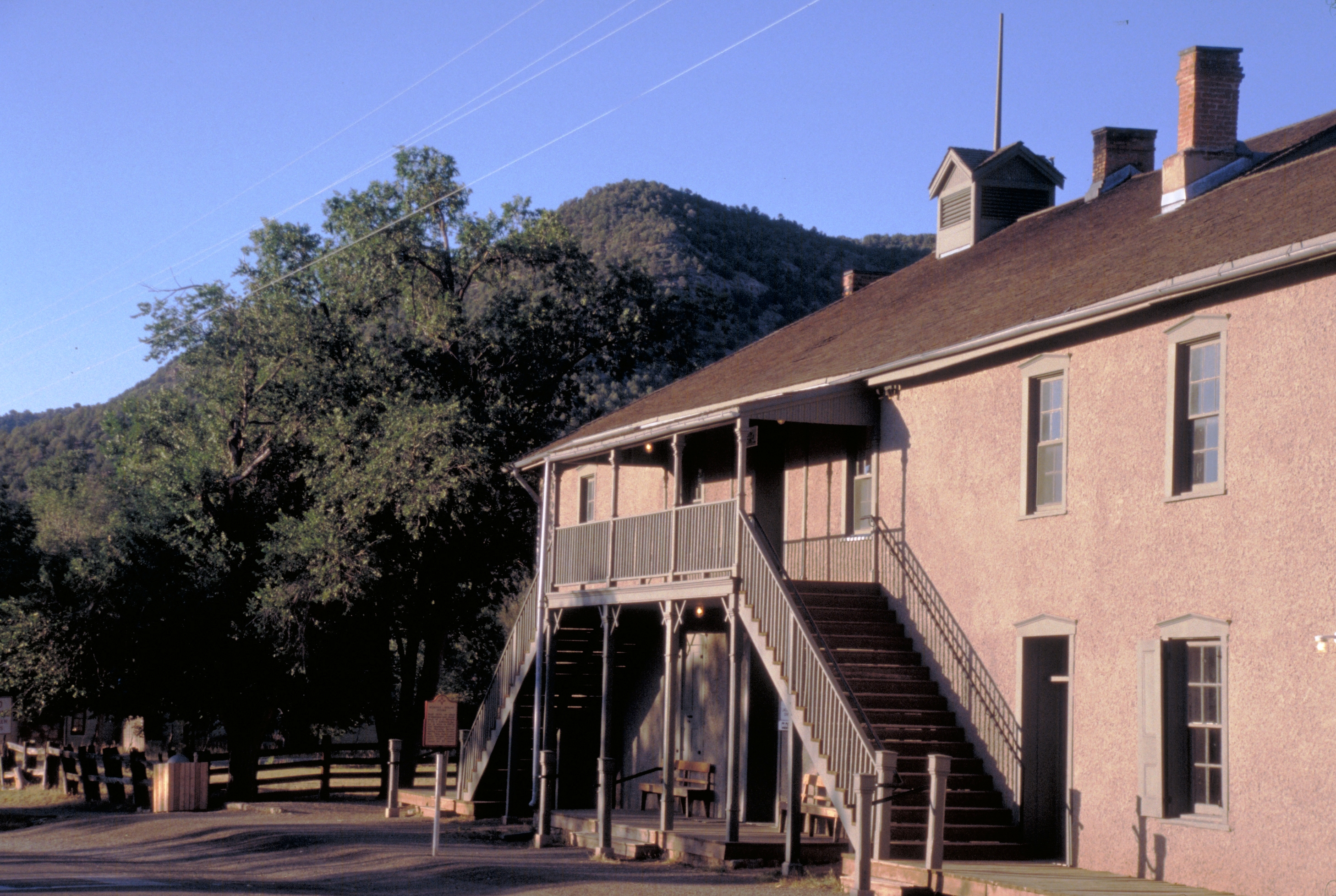
- Lincoln Courthouse and Jail, where Billy the Kid was held

- Location within New Mexico Location within the United States
- Coordinates: 33°29′31″N 105°23′02″W
- Country: United States
- State: New Mexico
- County: Lincoln

Population (2010)
  - Total: 189
- Time zone: UTC-7 (Mountain (MST))
  - Summer (DST): UTC-6 (MDT)

Lincoln is an unincorporated village in Lincoln County, New Mexico, United States.

== Description ==
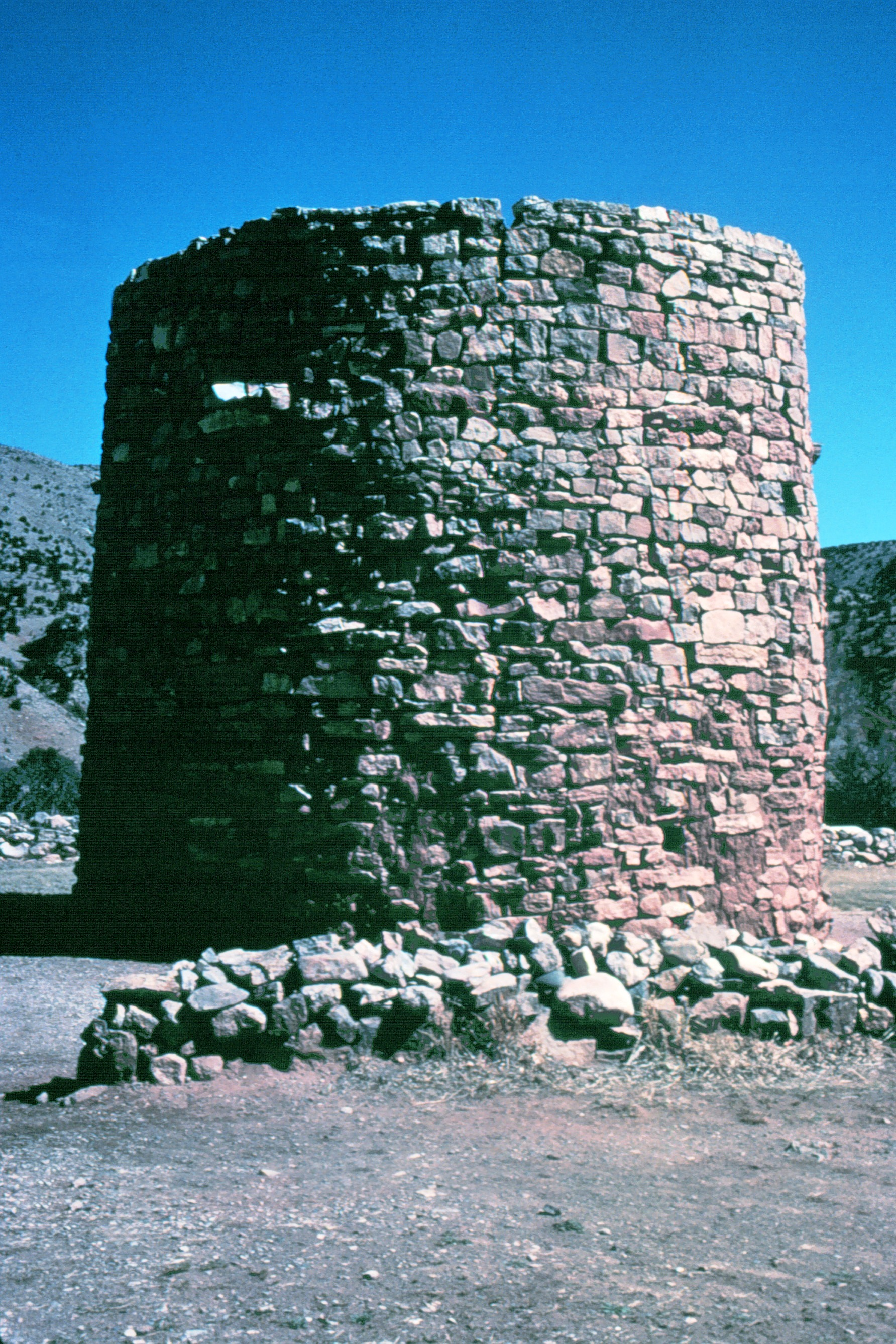
The Torreon, a rock fort tower where settlers hid during Indian raids.

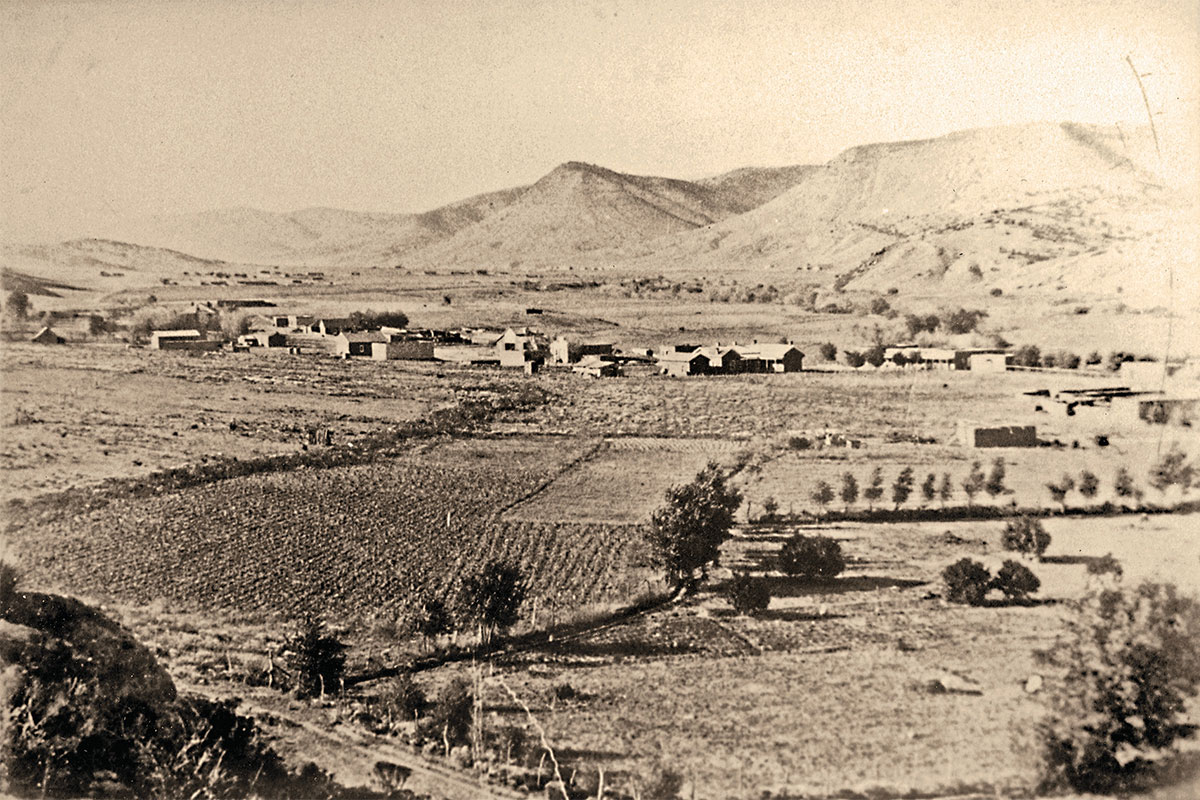
Lincoln in the 19th century.

The community sits in the Bonito Valley between the Sacramento Mountains and the Capitan Mountains at an elevation of 5,696 feet (1,736 m). The village is located approximately 57 miles (92 km) west of Roswell (by road) and just north of the Lincoln National Forest. Lincoln is the primary community in zip code 88338, which had a population of 189 residents in the 2010 census. The village is centered around a 1 mile (1.6 km) stretch of U.S. Route 380 (also known as the Billy the Kid Trail), which is the village's only street. Numerous historic structures dating as far back as the late 1800s still remain, many of which have been preserved and now operate as public museums.

Originally called La Placita del Rio Bonito (The Place by the Pretty River) by the Hispanic families who settled it in the 1850s, the name of the community was changed to Lincoln when Lincoln County was created on January 16, 1869. Lincoln was at the center of the Lincoln County War, 1876-1879, and is primarily known today for its historical ties to Billy the Kid. The village holds an annual festival called Old Lincoln Days in August featuring an open-air enactment of The Last Escape of Billy the Kid.

Lincoln has been Federally designated as the Lincoln Historic District, and also as a New Mexico State Monument called the Lincoln Historic Site. These designations, along with the efforts of generations of local residents, have made Lincoln one of the best preserved old west towns left in existence and the most visited monument in the State of New Mexico.

For about a year during World War II, the Old Raton Ranch, an abandoned Civilian Conservation Corps camp on the outskirts of Lincoln, was used to confine Japanese American railroad workers and their families. All 32 internees came from Clovis, New Mexico; the town's entire Japanese American population was placed under house arrest shortly after the attack on Pearl Harbor brought the U.S. into the war, and the Immigration and Naturalization Service "evacuated" them to Lincoln on January 23, 1942. Unlike the "assembly centers" where most Japanese Americans spent the first months of their wartime incarceration, access to school, employment and recreational activities was not permitted in Lincoln. On December 18, 1942, the internees were transferred to several of the more public concentration camps run by the War Relocation Authority.

== Tourism and entertainment ==
=== Historic attractions ===
Lincoln has numerous historic structures, nine of which are open to the public as museums operated by New Mexico Historic Sites. These include the Courthouse where Billy the Kid killed deputies James W. Bell and Bob Olinger, the Tunstall Store, the Convento, the Torreon and others. The Anderson Freeman Visitor Center has interpretive displays and artifacts that depict the history of Lincoln and the Bonito Valley.

=== Nearby attractions ===
- Fort Stanton Historic Site
- Smokey Bear Historical Park
- Snowy River Cave

== Notable people ==
- Richard Farnsworth (1920–2000), actor and stuntman

== See also ==
- Lincoln County War
