= McNulty =

- Language: Irish

Origin
- Meaning: "son of the Ulsterman"
- Region of origin: Ulster, Ireland

Other names
- Variant forms: McAnulty, McEnulty, (Donlevy)

McNulty is an Irish surname. It is derived from the Gaelic Mac an Ultaigh meaning "son of the Ulsterman". Usually considered a branch of the Ulaid ruling dynasty of Mac Duinnshléibhe (MacDonlevy), a branch of Dál Fiatach, who fled Ulaid to Ailech after the former's conquest in 1177 by the Normans. DNA analysis points to descent from other Ulaid families as well. After the Battle of Kinsale in 1602, some McDonlevys and McNultys migrated to the province of Connacht where their name is now also common.

== Origin ==
The name is said to have arisen from a branch of the ruling Ulaid dynasty of Mac Duinnshléibhe (MacDonlevy) who had migrated to what is now County Donegal in the Republic of Ireland after John de Courcy's conquest of Ulaid in 1177. Here some of the MacDonlevys were nicknamed Ultagh/Ultach. However, historical records such as the 1659 "Census" as well as Griffith's Valuation (1848–1864) show that concentrations of McNultys were found in parts of Ireland where the MacDonlevys had little presence, coupled with DNA analysis showing that the McNultys may actually derive from other Gaelic families that migrated from Ulaid and not just the MacDonlevy's. The names Ultagh/Ultach and Mac an Ultaigh applied to only those that fled Ulaid and was not used for those that remained.

Regardless of their actual origin, the first McNulty to be recorded is found in the Annals of the Four Masters under the year 1281, where an "Murtough Macan-Ulty" is listed as a distinguished fatality at the battle of Desertcreagh in present-day County Tyrone, Northern Ireland.

The probable transition of the name Mac an Ultaigh from the Ultagh MacDonlevy's can be seen around 1601 where one "Morris Ultagh" is recorded as "Morris m'Nich Ultagh". The surname prefix "m'Nich" appears to be an English confusion of the female prefix Nic with the male prefix Mac.

Other variant spellings of McNulty include McNaulty, McNalty, and rarely as O'Nalty, Nolty, McNult, McEnulty and McKnulty. and others. McNulty has been Anglicized as North.

In County Clare and its adjacent County Tipperary in the southwest of the Republic of Ireland, the toponymics Connoulty and Kinoulty are encountered, and are believed to be Anglicisations of Mac an Ultaigh.

== Diaspora ==
By 1980, there were 19,469 persons surnamed McNulty in the United States Social Security Administration data base. The surname McNulty was, then, the 2332 most frequently occurring surname in that database. Some of the first McNulty immigrants to North America arrived in Philadelphia and New York City in the very early 19th century and, later, more numerously, in both Philadelphia and New York City between 1840 and 1860, during which period the Great Famine of Ireland occurred.

There are an estimated 421 persons surnamed McNulty in Australia. Denis McInulty, one of the first McNulty to arrive in Australia, arrived there from Scotland on 16 May 1846 on the prisoner transport the China under a 10-year sentence of the Glasgow Justiciary Court.

In the United Kingdom the surname McNulty is shared by an estimated 7,318 people and is approximately the 1,472th most popular surname in the country.

== Notable McNultys ==
=== Actors ===
- Amybeth McNulty, Irish Canadian television actress
- Christina McNulty, Canadian silent film actress
- Clare McNulty, American actress
- Geraldine McNulty, English actress
- Jennie McNulty, American actress
- Kevin McNulty (actor), Canadian actor
- Marguerite McNulty, American actress
- Mariana McNulty, American actress who used the stage name Penny Singleton
- Matthew McNulty, English actor
- Neil McNulty, Scottish actor
- Owen Patrick Eugene McNulty, Irish actor who used the stage name Dennis Day
- Patricia McNulty, American actress

=== Musicians ===
- Ann McNulty, stage, radio and recording artist
- Chris McNulty, Australian jazz vocalist
- Daniel McNulty, Irish composer
- Mal McNulty, English musician
- Mario J. McNulty, American producer
- Paul McNulty (piano maker), American piano maker
- Thomas Francis McNulty, American composer

=== Military ===
- F. Lynn McNulty, American CIA operative
- James F. McNulty (rear admiral), American Navy rear admiral
- John McNulty (U.S. Marine Corps), American marine
- John R. McNulty, American soldier
- Richard R. McNulty, American Navy rear admiral
- William A. McNulty, American soldier

=== Politicians ===
- Anthony F. McNulty, American member of the Pennsylvania House of Representatives
- Caleb J. McNulty, American politician
- Clifford McNulty, American member of the Florida House of Representatives
- Des McNulty, Scottish politician
- Francis McNulty (Kansas politician), former state Representative
- Francis McNulty Jr., American politician
- Francis J. McNulty, former Delaware state Representative
- Frank McNulty (Colorado legislator), American politician
- Frank Joseph McNulty, American politician
- James McNulty (Canadian politician), Canadian politician
- James Barrett McNulty, American politician
- James F. McNulty Jr., American politician
- John F. McNulty, American politician
- John J. McNulty, American politician
- John J. McNulty Jr., American politician
- Joseph McNulty, American politician
- Justin McNulty, Irish politician and Gaelic football player
- Mark McNulty (politician), American politician
- Martin McNulty Crane, American politician
- Michael R. McNulty, former US Representative
- Paul McNulty, American politician
- Peter H. McNulty, American politician
- Raymond J. McNulty, American politician
- Tim McNulty (politician), American politician
- Thomas F. McNulty, American politician
- Tony McNulty, English politician
- William McNulty Brodhead, American politician

=== Sportspeople ===
- Arthur McNulty, English football player
- Bill McNulty, American baseball player
- Billy McNulty, Scottish football player
- Brandon McNulty, American cyclist
- Carl McNulty, American basketball player
- Dave McNulty, British swimming coach
- Doug McEnulty, American football NFL player
- Enda McNulty, Irish Gaelic footballer
- Geoff McNulty, Canadian lacrosse player
- Jimmy McNulty (footballer), English footballer
- Jim McNulty (ice hockey), Canadian ice hockey player
- Joe McNulty, Irish footballer
- Joe McNulty (skier), American skier
- Joel McNulty, American hurdler
- John McNulty (American football), American football coach
- John F. McNulty Jr., American athletics coach
- Josh McNulty, English rugby player
- Marc McNulty, Scottish footballer
- Mark McNulty, Irish/Zimbabwean golfer
- Mike McNulty (boxing manager), American boxing manager
- Pat McNulty, American baseball player
- Pat McNulty (footballer), Australian rules football player
- Paul McNulty (American football), American football player
- Peter McNulty (Gaelic footballer), Irish Gaelic footballer
- Steve McNulty, English footballer
- Tim McNulty (rally driver), Irish rally driver
- Thomas McNulty (footballer), English footballer

=== Writers ===
- Bernard McNulty, Irish-American literary figure
- Charles McNulty, American journalist
- Edward McNulty, Irish novelist
- Faith McNulty, American author
- Fran McNulty, Irish journalist
- John McNulty (journalist), American journalist
- John K. McNulty, American legal scholar
- Phil McNulty, English sports writer

=== Other ===
- Anna McNulty, Canadian YouTuber
- David L. McNulty, U.S. Marshal
- Deborah McNulty, American make-up artist
- Eileen McNulty, American tax commissioner
- Elizabeth McNulty, American beauty pageant titleholder, Miss Louisiana USA 2007, and Top 15 Miss USA 2007
- James McNulty (Irish activist), Irish republican
- James A. McNulty, the American priest
- James F. McNulty (chief executive), American businessman
- James J. McNulty, American businessman
- John McNulty (artist), Irish artist
- John McNulty (bishop), English priest
- John McNulty (steamboat captain), American sailor
- John L. McNulty, American priest
- Kathleen McNulty, Irish American computer programmer
- Kevin McNulty (judge), American judge
- Patrick J. McNulty, American judge
- Peter McNulty (film editor), American film editor
- Robert W. McNulty, American dentist
- Roy McNulty, Northern Irish businessman
- Sallie Keller McNulty, American statistician
- William Charles McNulty, American artist
- William N. McNulty, a Roman Catholic priest and the hero of the 1880 Garret Mountain May Day riot

== Fictional characters ==
- Jimmy McNulty, a character on HBO drama The Wire
  - Elena McNulty (Jimmy's estranged wife), Sean James McNulty (Jimmy's and Elena's eldest son) and Michael Barnes McNulty (Jimmy's and Elena's youngest son) also appear as characters on The Wire.
- Liam McNulty, a fictional character in BBC Scotland soap opera River City
- Middenface McNulty, post-apocalyptic science fiction character
- McNulty Rugrats
  - There are 7 McNulty characters in the Emmy nominated animated TV series.
  - 5 McNulty brother Rugrats (Timothy, Todd, Ty, Teddy and Terry)
  - The brothers' grandfather Conan
  - The brothers' mother Colleen
- Lt. Ray McNulty and his son Van McNulty are characters in the U.S. TV series Smallville
- Meet Mr. McNutley was a successful CBS television network series that ran 44 episodes from 1953 to 1955. The show's title and the last name of its main character were changed to "McNulty" in the second episode. The show was, later, again, retitled the Ray Milland Show. Milland played the show's main character Prof. Ray McNulty. The U.S. television actress Phyllis Avery played the professor's wife Peggy McNulty.
- The eye patched rogue and heel Red McNulty "of Dublin, Ireland" and the outright villain Ivan Koloff "The Russian Bear" were ring personas of Canadian wrestler Oreal Perras (Oreal James Perras), a former WWE World Heavyweight Champion who fought 3,962 documented career bouts.
- Stephen Graham played the character Peter McNulty in 2 episodes of the TV series Jump.
- Thelma Ritter won the Oscar for Best Supporting Actress for her portrayal of Ellen McNulty in the 1951 film the Mating Season.
- Actress Gene Tierney played Maggie Carleton McNulty in the Mating Season (1951).
- There is a McNulty character in both the movie Trancers and its sequel Trancers II. In both movies the McNulty character is portrayed by actor Art LaFleur.
- Maggie Cline became famous in vaudeville singing popular Irish songs, including "How McNulty Carved His Duck".
- There is a Moshi Monsters moshling character in the puppies set named McNulty.
- Patrick McNulty, the main character in the Twilight Zone episode "A Kind of a Stopwatch"
- Lt. Nulty, Los Angeles, California police detective, a featured character in Raymond Chandler's second Philip Marlowe detective novel, Farewell, My Lovely, which was thrice produced as a movie under various titles (1942, 1944, and 1975) and was adapted for radio broadcast.
- In 23 episodes of the NBC television drama E-Ring, Dennis Hopper played the character Colonel Eli McNulty, who in story is a combat decorated former POW and Vietnam War veteran and principal staff officer of a "Special Operations Division".

== Places ==
- McAnulty College and Graduate School of Liberal Arts, Duquesne University
- McNulty Gulch near Leadville, Colorado in the U.S. Ten Mile Mining District.
- McNulty Campus at the United States Merchant Marine Academy, King's Point, New York, named after Vice Admiral Richard R. McNulty, the Academy's "father" and its third superintendent.
- McNulty Hall, a residence hall at Johnson and Wales University in Providence, Rhode Island, is named after Lieutenant Colonel John F. McNulty Jr., who was the University's Dean of Students for near 3 decades and its Athletic Director.
- McNulty Hall, which is Seton Hall University's Technology and Research Center is named after Monsignor John L. McNulty, the University's 13th President.
- McNulty Lake is a lake in Lee County, Arkansas
- The community of McNulty, Oregon is named after Oregon pioneer John McNulty, as are the Warren, Oregon headquartered McNulty Water Association, which serves some 700 families in Columbia County, Oregon west of St. Helens, Oregon and McNulty Way in St. Helens, Oregon.
- McNulty Reservoir Dam in Eagle County, Colorado, named after Colorado's McNulty family cattle ranchers, who settled in Eagle County, Colorado, in the 1880s, eventually, operating a 2500-acre cattle ranch there near Leadville, Colorado
- McNulty Reservoir (Malheur County, Oregon), named after the Northwest US pioneer John McNulty.
- Downtown McNulty Station in St. Petersburg, Florida is named after John T. McNulty, who became Chief of the St. Petersburg Fire Department in the year 1913.
- Upper McNulty Reservoir in Oregon, US, named after Columbia River pioneer John McNulty.

== McNulty rhyolite ==
Found in a single location on the earth's surface, that is McNulty Gulch near Leadville Colorado, McNulty rhyolite is a comparatively rare gem rock quality variety of rhyolite rock. McNulty rhyolite appears in the official U.S. Department of Interior, United States Geological Survey Lexicon of Geological Names of the United States.

== Nulty ==
This is a variant of McNulty. Notable bearers of the name are:

- Mark Nulty (born 1967), former Irish cricketer
- Thomas Nulty (1818–1898), Bishop of Meath, Ireland

== See also ==
- List of Celtic tribes
- Irish medical families
- Irish royal families
- List of Irish kingdoms
- Fiatach Finn
- Dál Fiatach
- Haughey
- Hoey
- Clan MacLea
- Livingstone (name)
- Nulton (surname)
- O'Donnell dynasty
- Ó Duinnshléibhe
