= John McNulty =

John McNulty may refer to:

- John McNulty (journalist) (1895–1956), American journalist and author
- John McNulty (American football) (born 1968), American football coach
- John McNulty (steamboat captain) (1830–?), Columbia River steamboat captain
- John McNulty (artist) (born 1949), Irish artist
- John McNulty (U.S. Marine Corps) (fl. c. 1918), U.S. Marine Corps’ World War I war hero
- John McNulty (bishop) (1879–1943), English prelate of the Roman Catholic Church
- John F. McNulty Jr. (1917–2004), college track coach
- John J. McNulty Jr. (1922–2009), New York political power broker
- John J. McNulty, III, Col., Chief of U.S. Army House Liaison Division at the Pentagon during Gulf War
- John K. McNulty (born 1934), American legal scholar
- John L. McNulty (1898–?), president of Seton Hall University
- John R. McNulty (1832–1912), Confederacy (American Civil War) war hero
- John F. McNulty (1896–1984), member of the Maryland House of Delegates
- John J. McNulty (1883–1947), member of the Minnesota Legislature
- John McNulty, see Jonathan Letterman, Medical Director of the Army of the Potomac XII Corps
- John McNulty (Seanad candidate), whose nomination caused a political controversy in Ireland in 2014
