= James McNulty =

James or Jim McNulty may refer to:

- James T. Nulty (1857–1935), U.S. inventor and legislator
- James McNulty (Irish activist) (1890–1977), member Clan na Gael, commanded Doe Battalion of Irish Volunteers during Easter Rising
- James A. McNulty (1900–1972), American Roman Catholic bishop
- James McNulty (Canadian politician) (1918–2011), Canadian politician
- James F. McNulty Jr. (1925–2009), United States Representative from Arizona
- James McNulty (physician) (1926–2017), Western Australia Commissioner for Health
- James F. McNulty (U.S. radio engineer) (1929–2014), the co-inventor with Frederick G. Weighart of digital radiography
- James F. McNulty (rear admiral) (1929–2006), naval warfare and nautical educator
- Jim McNulty (ice hockey) (1930–2006), Canadian AHL hockey player
- James Barrett McNulty (1945–2016), former mayor of Scranton
- Jimmy McNulty (footballer) (born 1985), British footballer
- James J. McNulty, former C.E.O. of the Chicago Mercantile Exchange
- James F. McNulty (chief executive), executive for Parsons Corporation

== Fictional characters ==
- Jimmy McNulty, fictional character on the American television series The Wire
