= Francis McNulty =

Francis McNulty may refer to:

- Francis McNulty (Kansas politician) (1842/6–1885), American pioneer and member of the Kansas Legislature
- Francis J. McNulty, Delaware state legislator
- Francis McNulty Jr., member of the Iowa House of Representatives, 1896–1898
