= Rhyolite (disambiguation) =

Rhyolite (/ˈraɪ.ə.laɪt, ˈraɪ.oʊ-/ RY-ə-lyte, RY-oh-) is a type of volcanic rock. Rhyolite may also refer to

- Rhyolite, Nevada, a ghost town in the U.S.
- McNulty rhyolite, a geological formation in Colorado, U.S.
- Rhyolite Head, a headland in Antarctica
- Rhyolite Islands in Antarctica
- Aquacade (satellite) formerly known as Rhyolite
