= Senator McNulty =

Senator McNulty may refer to:

- Francis J. McNulty, Delaware State Senate
- James F. McNulty Jr. (1925–2009), Arizona State Senate
