= Thomas McNulty =

Thomas McNulty may refer to:

- Thomas McNulty (footballer) (1929–1979), English football player
- Thomas F. McNulty (1906–?), American radio broadcasting executive
- Thomas Francis McNulty (1858–1932), American Democratic Party political operative and epithetist
- Thomas Nulty (1818–1898), or McNulty, Irish Roman Catholic bishop
