= William McNulty =

William McNulty may refer to:

- William N. McNulty (1829–1922), American Roman Catholic priest
- William Charles McNulty (1889–1963), American artist
- William A. McNulty (1910–2005), U.S. Army officer
- Bill McNulty (born 1946), American baseball player.
- Billy McNulty (born 1949), Scottish football goalkeeper
- William McNulty, founder of Team Rubicon in 2010
