= List of Old West lawmen =

This is a list of Old West lawmen: notable people who served in various law enforcement positions during the Old West period.

Name	Portrait	Life	Years active	Comments	Ref.
John Hicks Adams	No image available	1830–1878	1864–1878	Sheriff, Santa Clara County, California, Deputy U.S. Marshal, Arizona Territory	
Alfred Shea Addis		1832–1886	1883–1886	Territorial Marshal, Tucson, Arizona 1883–1886; Deputy US Marshal, Grant County	
Samuel B. Amidon		1863-1925	1897-1901	County Attorney, Sedgwick County, Kansas. Prosecuted Carrie Nation, once advised Bill Dalton, member of the Dalton Gang and leader of the Doolin-Dalton Gang	
William "Red" Angus	No image available	1849–1922	1888–1893	Sheriff, Johnson County, Wyoming	
Elfego Baca		1865–1945	1884–1890	New Mexico	
Phillip Cuney "P.C." Baird	No image available	1862–1928	1882–1884; 1888–1898	Sheriff and Texas Ranger, Mason County, Texas	
Mariano Barela	No image available	1837–1892		Sheriff and U.S. Marshal, Mesilla, New Mexico	
Joel Almon Bascom	No image available	1832–1912		Chief of Police, Provo, Utah and constable of Mona, Utah	
John Watson Bell Bascom	No image available	1869–1948		Deputy Sheriff, Uintah County, Utah and constable of Naples, Utah	
Charlie Bassett		1847–1896	1873–1879	Sheriff of Ford County, Kansas, Marshal of Dodge City [In Dodge Peace Commission Photograph Bassett is seated in the front row at far left]	
Johnny Behan		1845–1912	1871–1882	Sheriff, Cochise County, Arizona Territory	
Horace Bell		1830–1918		Los Angeles Ranger	
James W. Bell	No image available	1853–1881		Deputy Sheriff, Lincoln County, New Mexico	
Sam Bernard	No image available	1880–1964		Deputy Lincoln County, New Mexico, Hillsboro, New Mexico	
Carl P.F. "Charles" Birkenfeld	No image available	1852–1923	1904–1917	Constable, Pima County, Arizona	
N. K. Boswell		1841–1904		Sheriff, Laramie, Wyoming	
William J. Brady		1829–1878	1869–1878	Sheriff, Lincoln County, New Mexico	
Billy Breakenridge		1846–1931		Deputy Sheriff and U.S. Marshal, Cochise County, Arizona Territory	
William L. Brooks		1832–1874		Marshal, Newton, Kansas and Dodge City, Kansas	
Charles "Charley" J. Brown	No image available	1845–1884	1875–1884	Sheriff, Pembina County, Dakota Territory; Deputy U.S. Marshal, Dakota Territory	
Henry Newton Brown		1857–1884		Marshal, Tascosa, Texas (ghost town) and Caldwell, Kansas	
Neal "Skinny" Brown	No image available	1844–1926	1879–1895	Assistant Marshal, Dodge City, Kansas; U.S. Marshal, Oklahoma Territory	
Seth Bullock		1849–1919		Sheriff, Lewis and Clark County, Montana; Sheriff, Lawrence County, South Dakota; U. S. Marshal Dakota Territorych	
Mathew Caldwell	No image available	1798–1842		Gonzales Ranging Company of Mounted Volunteers 1836, Sheriff of Gonzales (Guadalupe, Dewitt, Caldwell, Lavaca) Counties 1837, Gonzales & Seguin Texas Rangers 1839	
Frank M. Canton		1849–1927		Sheriff, Johnson County, Wyoming; Deputy U.S. Marshal, Oklahoma Territory; Under Sheriff, Q County, Oklahoma	
James W. Carr	No image available	1845–1926		Marshal Silverton, Colorado; Marshal Rico, Colorado; Deputy Sheriff Ouray County, Colorado; Deputy Sheriff Dolores County, Colorado	
Charles Francis Colcord		1859–1934		Deputy U.S. Marshal, Oklahoma Territory; Chief of Police, Oklahoma, Oklahoma Territory	
David J. Cook		1842–1907		Marshal, Denver, Colorado	
"Longhair" Jim Courtright		1848–1887		Omaha, Nebraska Marshal, Marshal, Lake Valley, New Mexico; Sheriff, Fort Worth, Texas; Detective, Fort Worth, Texas	
Frank Dalton		1859–1887		Deputy U.S. Marshal, Fort Smith, Arkansas, Oklahoma Territory	
Ben Daniels		1852–1923		US Marshal, Pima County, Arizona sheriff, superintendent of Yuma Territorial Prison	
James "Jim" M. Dodson	No image available	1876–1890		Prescott, Arizona City Marshal; Arizona State Penitentiary Wall Guard (post retirement)	
Ed Drew		1865–1911		Pinal County, Arizona deputy sheriff	
Morgan Earp		1851–1882		Deputy Sheriff, Ford County, Kansas; Marshal, Butte, Montana; U.S. Deputy Marshal, Arizona Territory; Deputy Policeman/Marshal, Arizona Territory	
Virgil Earp		1843–1906		Deputy Policeman and Assistant Marshal, Dodge City, Kansas; Deputy U.S. Marshal, Prescott, Arizona; Deputy U.S. Marshal, Tombstone, Arizona; Marshal/Chief of Police, Tombstone, Arizona; Sheriff, Colton, California; Deputy Sheriff Esmeralda County, Nevada	
Warren Earp		1855–1900		U.S. Deputy Marshal, Cochise County, Arizona Territory; Special Ranger (Arizona Cattleman's Association)	
Wyatt Earp		1848–1929		Constable, Lamar, Missouri; Marshal (for 1 hour), Ellsworth, Kansas; Deputy Policeman, Wichita, Kansas; Assistant Marshal, Dodge City, Kansas; Deputy Sheriff, Pima County, Arizona, Arizona Territory); Deputy Policeman and Assistant Marshal, Tombstone, Arizona, Arizona Territory; Deputy U.S. Marshal, Arizona Territory	
Stringer W. Fenton	No image available	1865–1936		Marshal, Indian Territory, Oklahoma, Osage County	
John King Fisher		1854–1884		acting sheriff of Uvalde County, Texas	
Camillus Sidney Fly	No image available	1849–1901		Sheriff, Cochise County, Arizona Territory	
Pat Garrett		1850–1908		Sheriff, Lincoln County, New Mexico; Sheriff, Doña Ana County, New Mexico; Customs Collector, El Paso, Texas; Texas Ranger Captain, Texas	
Lee Hall		1849–1911		Texas Ranger	
Wiley G. Haines	No image available	1860–1928		Undersheriff, County P, Oklahoma Territory; Deputy U.S. Marshal, Oklahoma Territory; Chief, Osage Indian Police	
John Coffee "Captain Jack" Hays		1817–1883		Captain in the Texas Rangers; first sheriff of San Francisco (1850)	
Jack Helm	No image available	1838–1873		Sheriff, DeWitt County, Texas	
James Butler "Wild Bill" Hickok		1837–1876		Marshal, Abilene, Kansas and Hays City, Kansas	
John Henry "Doc" Holliday		1851–1887		Special Police Officer, Tombstone, Arizona Territory; Deputy U.S. Marshal Arizona Territory	
John R. Hughes		1855–1947		Texas Ranger	
James B. Hume		1827–1904		Marshal, Placerville, California; Undersheriff, El Dorado County, California; Sheriff, El Dorado County, California; Chief Detective, Wells, Fargo & Co.	
Grant Johnson	No image available	1858–1929		Deputy U.S. Marshal, Indian Territory	
John "Liver-Eating" Johnson	No image available	1824–1900		Deputy Sheriff/Town Marshal	
John B. Jones		1834–1891		Texas Ranger	
Jeff Kidder	No image available	1875–1908		Arizona Ranger	
John M. Larn	No image available	1849–1877		outlaw and Sheriff, Shackelford County, Texas	
James Franklin "Bud" Ledbetter	No image available	1852–1937		Deputy Sheriff, Johnson County, Arkansas; Deputy U.S. Marshal, Oklahoma Territory; Sheriff, Muskogee County, Oklahoma	
Isaiah W. Lees	No image available	1830–1902		Detective, San Francisco, California	
William Sidney "Cap" Light	No image available	1864–1893		Deputy Sheriff, Belton, Texas, Temple, Texas and Creede, Colorado	
Steve "Big Steve" Long	No image available	d. 1868		outlaw and Deputy Marshal, Laramie, Wyoming Territory	
Harry Love		1809–1868		Captain, California State Rangers (1853–1855)	
Chris Madsen	No image available	1851–1944		U.S. Marshal, Oklahoma Territory	
Bat Masterson		1853–1921		Deputy Sheriff/Sheriff Ford County, Kansas; Marshal, Trinidad, Colorado; U. S. Deputy Marshal, Dodge City, Kansas; Peace Commissioner/Deputy U.S. Marshal, Southern District of New York	
Ed Masterson		1852–1878		Marshal, Dodge City, Kansas	
James Masterson		1855–1895		Dodge City, Kansas, Ford County, Kansas, Ingalls, Kansas, Deputy U.S. Marshal	
Andrew "Andy" Mather	No image available	1851–1929		Texas Ranger, Williamson County, Texas, Co. E, Frontier Battalion, under Captain Maltby	
Mysterious Dave Mather		1851–?	1880–1885	Assistant Marshal Dodge City Kansas; Town Marshal New Kiowa Kansas	
Joseph McNulty		1841–1909		Sheriff, Rooks County, Kansas	
Tolbert "Tol" Fannin McKinney	No image available	1857–1938		Lt. Texas Ranger, Co. D & E.; Frontier Battalion under Captains John R. Hughes & John H Rogers; Deputy Sheriff in Uvalde, Zavala, Bandera, Brewster, and El Paso Counties, Texas	
Leander H. McNelly		1844–1877		Texas Ranger	
William H. "High Water Bill" Moorhead	No image available	1867–1870		First sheriff of Pembina County, Dakota Territory which also made him the first sheriff in what is now the State of North Dakota; also served as Pembina town marshal, and Pembina County deputy sheriff. Nicknamed "High Water Bill" for his predictions on how high the flooding Red River of the North would get each spring, predictions that usually included the exchange of money and property.	
David Neagle	No image available	1847–1926		Deputy Sheriff, Cochise County, Arizona Territory; Marshal, Tombstone, Arizona Territory; Detective, US Marshal, San Francisco, California	
Evett Dumas Nix		1861–1946		US Marshal, Fort Smith, Arkansas, Nasty Nate, Kansas	
Robert Bob Olinger		1841–1881	1878–1881	Deputy Sheriff, Lincoln County, New Mexico	
William Owen "Buckey" O'Neill		1860–1898		Sheriff, Yavapai County, Arizona	
Commodore Perry Owens		1852–1919		Sheriff, Apache County, Arizona	
Allan Pinkerton		1819–1884		Pinkerton Detective Agency Founder	
Robert Pinkerton	No image available	1848–1907		Pinkerton Detective	
William A. Pinkerton	No image available	1846–1923		Pinkerton Detective	
Henry Plummer		1837–1864		Marshal, Nevada City, California; Sheriff Bannack, Montana	
Robert Jack Price	No image available	1848–1930		Constable	
Alexander Ramsey	No image available	1847–1875		Marshall, Hays City, Kansas, later, sheriff, Ellis County, Kansas, shot and captured Henry Born "Dutch Henry", shot and killed nine other outlaws in discharge of his duties	
Bass Reeves		1832–1910		Deputy U.S. Marshal, Indian Territory	
Porter Rockwell		1813–1878		Utah Territory	
George Scarborough	No image available	1859–1903		El Paso, Texas Sheriff, killed John Selman	
John Selman		1839–1896		El Paso, Texas Constable, killed John Wesley Hardin	
Charles A. Shibell		1841–1908	1875–1880; 1888	Sheriff Pima County Arizona	
Charles Sims	No image available	1879–1945		Town Marshal Rosedale, Oklahoma	
Charlie Siringo		1855–1928		Pinkerton detective	
Sam Sixkiller	No image available	1842–1886		Captain, U.S. Indian Police, Indian Territory; Deputy U.S. Marshal, Indian Territory	
John Slaughter		1841–1922		Sheriff and Texas Ranger, Cochise County, Arizona, Arizona Territory	
Lot Smith		1830–1892		Sheriff Davis County, Utah; in March 1853, Farmington, then known as Little Cottonwood, was approved by Utah Territorial Legislature as the County seat of Davis County; a year later, Lot Smith, who also served in Mormon Battalion at age 16, was appointed county's first sheriff	
Thomas Smith		1830–1870		Marshal and Deputy U.S. Marshal, Kit Carson, Colorado and Abilene, Kansas	
Con Stapleton	No image available	1848–1879		Marshal, Deadwood, South Dakota	
Dallas Stoudenmire		1845–1882		El Paso, Texas Marshal and Texas Ranger; Deputy U.S. Marshal	
Michael Sughrue	No image available	1844–1901		Sheriff, Clark County, Kansas; Marshal Ashland, Kansas; Deputy Sheriff, Ford County, Kansas; Deputy Marshal, Dodge City, Kansas	
Henry Andrew "Heck" Thomas		1850–1912		Deputy U.S. Marshal, Oklahoma Territory	
Ben Thompson		1842–1884		Marshal, Austin, Texas	
Bill Tilghman		1854–1924		Deputy Marshal, Dodge City, Kansas; Deputy U.S. Marshal, Oklahoma Territory; Sheriff, Lincoln County, Oklahoma; Chief of Police, Oklahoma City, Oklahoma	
James Timberlake		1846–1891		Deputy Marshal, Liberty, Missouri; County Sheriff, Clay County, Missouri; Constable, Liberty, Missouri	
Paden Tolbert		1863–1904		Deputy U.S. Marshal, Indian Territory	
Max Ventura	No image available	1866–		U.S. Marshal, Indian Affairs Delegate, North Dakota Territory	
John Joshua Webb	No image available	1847–1882		Deputy Marshal, Dodge City, Kansas; Marshal, Las Vegas, New Mexico	
Franklin Pierce West	No image available	1852–1886		Indian Territory Deputy Marshal	
William Fletcher Wheeler	No image available	1824–1894		Montana Territory U.S. Marshal 1869–1878, Lt Col, 1st MN Vol Inf, 1858–61, Capt, Co F, 4th MN Inf, 1861–64 (WIA at Vicksburg, Mississippi), 3rd U.S. Marshal in the Montana Territory, 1869–78; founder of Montana Historical Society	
Fred White		1849–1880		Marshal Tombstone, Arizona Territory; died in the line of duty	
Robert Widdowfield		1846–1878		Wyoming Deputy sheriff, first Wyoming officer to be killed in the line of duty	
Robert Widenmann	No image available	1852–1930		Deputy U.S. Marshal New Mexico Territory	
Charlie Wilson	No image available	1860–1889		City Marshal, Oceanside, California 1888–1889	
Jefferson "Keno" Wilson	No image available	1862–1934			

== See also ==
- List of Arizona Rangers
- List of cowboys and cowgirls
- List of Old West gunfighters
