= Tim McNulty =

Tim McNulty may refer to:

- Tim McNulty (rally driver)
- Tim McNulty (politician)
