= Rogues' gallery =

Police collection of mug shots

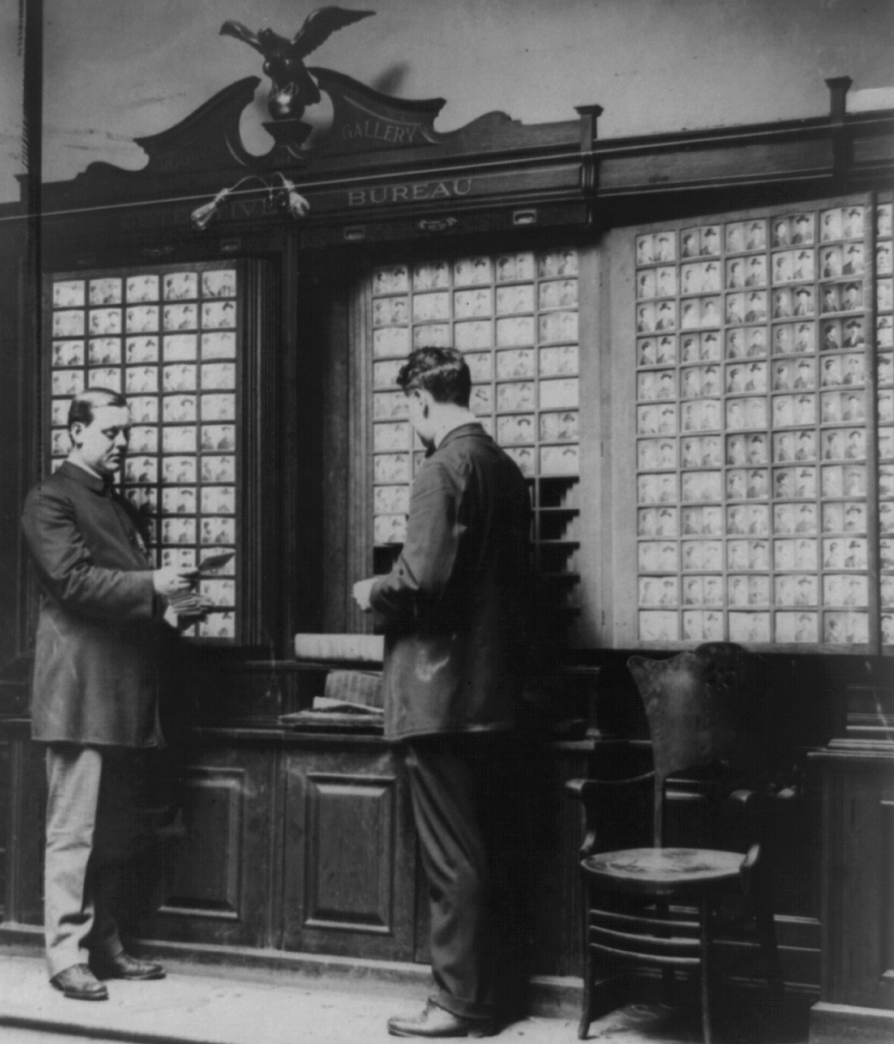
New York City Police Department rogues gallery, July 1909

A rogues' gallery (or rogues gallery) is a police collection of mug shots or other images of criminal suspects kept for identification purposes.

== History ==
In 1855, Allan Pinkerton, founder of the Pinkerton National Detective Agency, established a rogues' gallery – a compilation of descriptions, methods of operation (modi operandi), hiding places, and names of criminals and their associates. Another early collection was established circa 1854 or 1855 by the detective Isaiah W. Lees of the San Francisco Police Department.

Inspector Thomas Byrnes of the late-19th-century New York City Police Department popularized the term with his collection of photographs of known criminals, which was used for witness identification. Byrnes published some of these photos with details of the criminals in Professional Criminals of America (1886).

== See also ==
- Criminal record
- Public enemy
- Wanted poster
