= 91st Delaware General Assembly =

American legislative session

←	90th	92nd	→

Overview
- Legislative body: Delaware General Assembly
- Term: January 8, 1901 – January 6, 1903

The 91st Delaware General Assembly was a meeting of the legislative branch of the state government, consisting of the Delaware Senate and the Delaware House of Representatives. Elections were held the first Tuesday after November 1 and terms began in Dover on the first Tuesday in January. This date was January 1, 1901, which was two weeks before the beginning of the first administrative year of Governor John Hunn and Philip L. Cannon as Lieutenant Governor.

Currently the distribution of the Senate Assembly seats was made to seven senators for New Castle County and for five senators each for the Kent and Sussex counties. Likewise the current distribution of the House Assembly seats was made to fifteen representatives for New Castle County and for ten representatives each for the Kent and Sussex counties. The actual population changes of the county did not directly affect the number of senators or representatives at this time.

In the 91st Delaware General Assembly session both chambers had a Republican majority.

== Leadership ==
Senate

- Henry C. Ellison, Republican of New Castle County.

House of Representatives

- James V. McCommons, Republican of Kent County.

== Members ==
=== Senate ===
About half of the State Senators were elected every two years for four-year terms. Each was from a district in a specific county, with the number of districts determined by the state constitution, not the size of the population.

New Castle County

- 1. Samuel M. Knox
- 2. Francis J. McNulty
- 3. Webster Blakely
- 4. Benjamin A. Groves
- 5. Robert McFarlin
- 6. Henry C. Ellison
- 7. George M. D. Hart

Kent County

- 1. James R. Clements
- 2. James F. Allee Sr.
- 3. Stephen Slaughter
- 4. George D. Harrington
- 5. S. John Abbott

Sussex County

- 1. Simeon S. Pennewill
- 2. Charles Wright
- 3. Elisha H. F. Farlow
- 4. Isaiah J. Brasure
- 5. Franklin C. Maull

=== House of Representatives ===
All the State Representatives were elected every two years for two-year terms. Similarly to the State Senators, each was from a district in a specific county, with the number of districts determined by the state constitution.

New Castle County

- 1. James Hitchens
- 2. Samuel H. Baynard Sr.
- 3. James W. Robertson
- 4. Thomas M. Monaghan
- 5. John E. Healey
- 6. Frank P. Ewing
- 7. William R. Flinn
- 8. Richard T. Pilling
- 9. William Chandler
- 10. Chauncey P. Holcomb
- 11. John W. Dayett
- 12. Theodore F. Clark
- 13. James T. Shallross
- 14. Richard Hodgson
- 15. Andrew J. Wright

Kent County

- 1. Thomas C. Moore
- 2. John L. Scotten
- 3. John W. Hutchinson
- 4. James P. Aaron
- 5. Cornelius B. Hope
- 6. John H. Gooden
- 7. James V. McCommons
- 8. William G. Hardesty
- 9. David Vinyard
- 10. John M. White

Sussex County

- 1. George B. Clendaniel
- 2. Robert R. Layton
- 3. Walter M. Hearn
- 4. William J. West
- 5. Richard W. Ralph
- 6. Shadrack Short
- 7. Daniel J. Long
- 8. Harry S. Prettyman
- 9. Eli Pepper
- 10. Ebenezer W. Warren

== Places with more information ==
- Delaware Historical Society; website; 505 North Market Street, Wilmington, Delaware 19801; (302) 655-7161.
- University of Delaware; Library website; 181 South College Avenue, Newark, Delaware 19717; (302) 831-2965.
