= Ermine and Rhinestones =

1925 film directed by Burton L. King

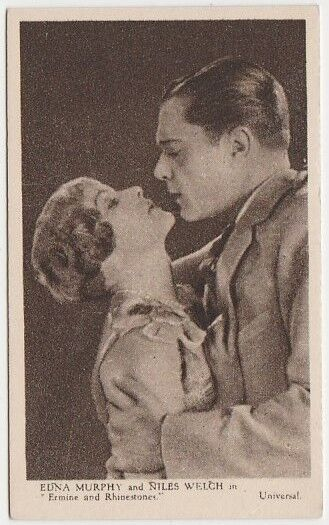
- Publicity photo for the film on a tobacco card
- Directed by: Burton L. King
- Written by: William B. Laub; Louise Winter
- Produced by: Burton L. King
- Starring: Edna Murphy; Niles Welch; Ruth Stonehouse
- Edited by: William B. Laub
- Production company: Burton King Productions
- Distributed by: Jans Film Service
- Release date: October 1, 1925
- Running time: 60 minutes
- Country: United States
- Languages: Silent; English intertitles

Ermine and Rhinestones is a 1925 silent film, written by Louise Winter, and directed by Burton L. King.

== Plot ==
Billy Kershaw, the son of a manufacturer in a small western town, comes to New York City on business. He becomes engaged to wealthy Peggy Rice, a member of the modern jazz set, who prefers to "play the field" with other men. Sometime before, Billy had sent Jim Gorman to jail for theft, causing Gorman's girl, Minette Christie, to leave town. At a fashion show, Peggy persuades Billy to buy her an ermine wrap, trimmed with rhinestones, which is modeled by a girl who turns out to be Minette. Billy realizes that Peggy is no more than a gold digger and breaks the engagement. Gorman shows up and attempts to kill Minette, for he believes she turned him in. Billy, however, defeats Gorman in a fight, and at the very last minute saves Minette from being gassed to death in her apartment. Billy comes to realize that Minette is the girl for him.

== Cast ==
- Edna Murphy as Minnette Christie
- Niles Welch as Billy Kershaw
- Ruth Stonehouse as Peggy Rice
- Coit Albertson as Pierce Ferring
- Sally Crute as Alys Ferring
- Bradley Barker as Jim Gorman
- Marguerite McNulty as Nita Frost
