= Edward McNulty =

Matthew Edward McNulty
- Born: 1856
- Died: 1943 (aged 86–87)
- Occupations: Playwright, novelist
- Known for: Childhood friend and primary biographical source on George Bernard Shaw

(Matthew) Edward McNulty (1856–1943) was an Irish playwright and novelist, known for his penned portrayals of Irish peasant life. Two of McNulty's plays, the 1914 comedy The Lord Mayor and the 1921 comedy The Courting of Mary Doyle, were successfully produced at the Abbey Theatre. McNulty's other works include the novels Misther O’Ryan (1894), The Son of a Peasant (1897), Maureen (1904) and Mrs. Mulligan’s Millions (1918). All of these novels were published by Edward Arnold, London, except Mrs. Mulligan’s Millions, which was also a play and was published separately as a novel and as a play by Maunsel, Dublin. The play The Lord Mayor was published by Talbot, Dublin. McNulty's other remaining play, The Courting Couple, was published by Gill, Dublin, posthumously, in 1944. McNulty's close personal friend, the Nobel laureate in literature and literary critic, George Bernard Shaw (1856–1950), referred to McNulty as a “genius”.

McNulty is today most remembered, though, as an indispensable historical source used in both live interview and archive by biographers of the eminent Irish playwright and socialist, George Bernard Shaw, himself a founder of the Fabian Society. The importance of McNulty as a primary biographical source on Shaw will quickly become apparent to any reader upon their perusal of just the first volume of Michael Holyroyd's three volume Bernard Shaw, Random House, NY 1988. 41 pages of McNulty's manuscript recollections of Shaw, including copies of Shaw's letters to him, were obtained from McNulty's estate by the University of North Carolina, Chapel Hill and are housed in its Rare Book Collection. A few pages of this uncopyrighted cache are reprinted with attribution as “Shaw as a Boy” at pp. 17–21 of Shaw Interviews and Recollections, A.M. Gibbs, ed., University of Iowa Press, Iowa City, 1990.

McNulty was the childhood friend of Shaw, the impoverished and neglected son of an abusive father and a neglectful mother. Shaw would drag McNulty to Dublin's National Gallery, where the oddly matched pair (the tall, thin and fair Shaw and the short, dark and pudgy McNulty), both talented artists, would wander for hours studying the gallery's paintings, until they could recognize the technique of any Flemish or Italian painter of the human figure on sight.

The two boys were inseparably bound. In fact, the earliest photograph of Shaw, taken by T. McKay and Co. in 1874 when Shaw was just 15, is with McNulty at his side. The pair took an art class together and, first, as noted above, dreamed of becoming successes as great artists. Then, later, they replaced this ambition with the dream of becoming successes as great literary figures, with Shaw taking a brief solo sojourn to dream of founding his own religion to achieve wealth, power and success. Both McNulty and Shaw achieved their dream of becoming literary figures, although, Shaw, quite more grandiosely.

McNulty and Shaw, who both lived to what for then was quite advanced age, maintained their intimate friendship throughout McNulty's slightly shorter life, through a tremendous and consuming, often, even, twice daily, written correspondence, when residing in different cities.
