= Nulton (surname) =

Nulton is a surname. Notable people who have had this name include:

- Ira Nulton, bassist of the Maine-based punk band The Stains
- Louis McCoy Nulton (1869–1954), United States Navy admiral, superintendent of US Naval Academy
- Lucy Nulton (1903–2000), American educator, folklorist

== See also ==
- McNulty (name)
- Nilton (name)
