= 88th Delaware General Assembly =

American legislative session

←	87th	89th	→

Overview
- Legislative body: Delaware General Assembly
- Term: January 7, 1895 – January 5, 1897

The 88th Delaware General Assembly was a meeting of the legislative branch of the state government, consisting of the Delaware Senate and the Delaware House of Representatives. Elections were held the first Tuesday after November 1 and terms began in Dover on the first Tuesday in January. This date was January 7, 1895, which was two weeks before the beginning of the first administrative year of Governor Joshua H. Marvil. He died and was replaced by William T. Watson.

Currently the distribution of the Senate Assembly seats was made to three senators for each of the three counties. Likewise the current distribution of the House Assembly seats was made to seven representatives for each of the three counties. The actual population changes of the county did not directly affect the number of senators or representatives at this time.

In the 88th Delaware General Assembly session both chambers had a Republican majority.

== Leadership ==
=== Senate ===
- William T. Watson, Kent County, Republican

=== House of Representatives ===
- Henry H. McMullen, New Castle County, Republican

== Members ==
=== Senate ===
Senators were normally elected by the public for a four-year term; although many were selected to fill the remainder of a vacant position.

New Castle County

- Samuel Alrichs
- Robert J. Hanby
- John C. Pyle

Kent County

- John W. Fennimore
- Thomas T. Lacey
- William T. Watson
  - Hezekiah Harrington

Sussex County

- John M. C. Moore
- George F. Pierce
- William T. Records

=== House of Representatives ===
Representatives were elected by the public for a two-year term.

New Castle County

- John W. Jolls
- Henry H. McMullen
- Walter S. Money
- Frederic Pyle
- George W. Reynold
- Francis M. Walker
- William Wilson Jr.

Kent County

- Alexander M. Daly
- William R. Davis
- Ezekiel Fleming
- Elwood C. Killen
- Horace R. Mustard
- Clarence D. Sypherd
- Thomas A. Watson

Sussex County

- Newell Ball
- Horace Brown
- Edward S. Burton
- Charles L. Moore
- Henry H. Morgan
- John M. Robbins
- George H. Townsend

== Places with more information ==
- Delaware Historical Society; website; 505 North Market Street, Wilmington, Delaware 19801; (302) 655-7161.
- University of Delaware; Library website; 181 South College Avenue, Newark, Delaware 19717; (302) 831-2965.
