= 92nd Delaware General Assembly =

American legislative session

| ← | 91st | 93rd | → |

Overview
- Legislative body: Delaware General Assembly
- Term: January 6, 1903 – January 3, 1905

The 92nd Delaware General Assembly was a meeting of the legislative branch of the state government, consisting of the Delaware Senate and the Delaware House of Representatives. Elections were held the first Tuesday after November 1 and terms began in Dover on the first Tuesday in January. This date was January 6, 1903, which was two weeks before the beginning of the third administrative year of Governor John Hunn and Philip L. Cannon as Lieutenant Governor.

The distribution of the Senate seats was seven senators for New Castle County and five senators each for the Kent and Sussex counties. Likewise the distribution of the Assembly seats was fifteen representatives for New Castle County and ten representatives each for the Kent and Sussex counties. The actual population changes of the county did not directly affect the number of senators or representatives at this time.

In the 92nd Delaware General Assembly both chambers had a Republican majority.

== Leadership ==
Senate

- Henry C. Ellison, Republican of New Castle County.

House of Representatives

- Henry S. Anthony, Republican of Kent County.

== Members ==
=== Senate ===
About half of the State Senators were elected every two years for a four-year term. They were from a district in a specific county, with the number of districts determined by the state constitution, not the size of the population.

New Castle County

- 1. George W. Sparks
- 2. Francis J. McNulty
- 3. Thomas J. Stirling
- 4. Benjamin A. Groves
- 5. Artemus Smith
- 6. Henry C. Ellison
- 7. John A. Latta

Kent County

- 1. Thomas C. Moore
- 2. James R. Clements
- 3. James F. Allee Sr.
- 4. George D. Harrington
- 5. Alvin B. Conner

Sussex County

- 1. Simeon S. Pennewill
- 2. Isaiah J. Brasure
- 3. David O. Moore
- 4. Charles Wright
- 5. Thomas W. Jefferson

=== House of Representatives ===
All the State Representatives were elected every two years for a two-year term. They were from a district in a specific county, with the number of districts determined by the state constitution, not the size of the population.

New Castle County

- 1. Henry G. Buckmaster
- 2. James P. Jones
- 3. John Bancroft
- 4. Thomas M. Monaghan
- 5. William M. Connelly
- 6. Abraham L. Tyre
- 7. William R. Flinn
- 8. William M. Eastburn
- 9. John W. Morrison
- 10. Chauncey P. Holcomb
- 11. David C. Rose Jr.
- 12. William A. Price
- 13. Leonard V. Aspril Jr.
- 14. Edward H. Hart
- 15. Samuel C. Derrickson

Kent County

- 1. Henry S. Anthony
- 2. Charles H. Paradee
- 3. George Cook
- 4. William H. Gehman
- 5. Thomas M. Gooden
- 6. Samuel Carl Hughes
- 7. Thomas E. Warren
- 8. Joseph Frazier
- 9. James W. Powell
- 10. Lavinus Austin

Sussex County

- 1. John W. Bennett
- 2. Oliver A. Newton
- 3. Frank Allen
- 4. Henry C. Riggin
- 5. Samuel J. Lowe
- 6. Rufus D. Lingo Jr.
- 7. John G. Townsend Jr.
- 8. Frank W. Lawson
- 9. Thomas R. Purnell
- 10. Joseph D. Thompson

== Places with more information ==
- Delaware Historical Society; website; 505 North Market Street, Wilmington, Delaware 19801; (302) 655-7161.
- University of Delaware; Library website; 181 South College Avenue, Newark, Delaware 19717; (302) 831-2965.
