= Rhyolite Islands =

Island group in Palmer Land, Antarctica

- Location within Antarctica

Geography
- Location: Rymill Coast, Palmer Land
- Coordinates: 69°40′S 68°35′W

Rhyolite Islands (69°40′S 68°35′W) is a group of islands and rocks which extend 4 nautical miles (7.4 km) in an east–west direction, lying close off the Rymill Coast of Palmer Land opposite the north side of the mouth of Eureka Glacier, in George VI Sound. Surveyed in 1948 by Falkland Islands Dependencies Survey (FIDS) and so named from the rock of which the islands are largely composed. The name "Grupo Maipo," after the Chilean oil tanker Maipo, may refer to these islands roughly charted by the Chilean Antarctic Expedition, 1947, in about 6954S, 6833W.

== See also ==
- List of Antarctic and sub-Antarctic islands
