= Daniel McNulty =

Daniel ("Dal") McNulty (20 June 1920 – 21 October 1996) was an Irish composer distinguished for his contributions to inspirational church music.

== Life ==
McNulty was born in Dublin and was blinded by an accident at age 4. He attended St. Mary's School for the Blind, studied at the Royal Irish Academy of Music and received a BMus (Bachelor of Music degree) from University College Dublin in 1944. He was organist and choirmaster at St. John's Augustinian Church, Dublin, from 1939, where he founded a boys choir, the Austin Singers. From 1967, he took on an additional appointment as organist of the newly opened Church of the Holy Spirit, Ballyroan. By external examination, he also became a Fellow of the Royal College of Organists, London (1942). His organ recitals were regularly broadcast on RTÉ and Vatican Radio. It is also for his compositions of sacred choral music, synthesizing elements of Irish folk song, for which McNulty was knighted to the Order of St. Gregory by Pope John Paul II in 1984. He died in Dublin.

== Music ==
McNulty's compositions divide into three periods. These are an early period of sacred choral works; a middle period, consisting almost exclusively of orchestral and instrumental works; and a third period, again of sacred choral works. His most renowned works are five masses, the first of which (1968) introduced his late period of composition and his return to exclusive composition of sacred choral music. These masses are still being sung in some Roman Catholic churches in the Republic of Ireland as part of the Sunday Liturgy. McNulty's secular or middle period compositions include Divertimento (for orchestra), three sinfoniettas (no. 1: The Four Provinces, 1957; no. 2, The Shamrock, 1958; no. 3, 1965), two piano concertinos (both 1964), Captain Thompson's Exploits (piano and orchestra), arrangements of Irish traditional music, solo piano pieces and songs.
