= Joseph McNulty =

American politician

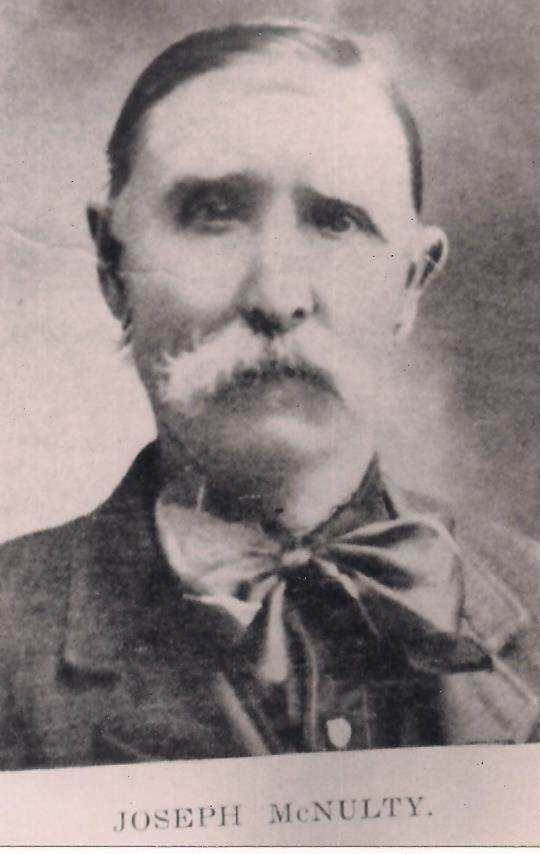
McNulty

Joseph McNulty (1841–1909) was an American pioneer and Old West "lawman", who served in the Kansas Legislature in 1873. He was the first member of the Kansas Legislature seated from Rooks County, Kansas.

== Early life and settlement of Rooks County, reading the law ==
McNulty was born in Canada on March 3, 1841. From the age of fourteen, he farmed and worked as a blacksmith. He was the first person to settle in Rooks County, homesteading the first piece of land there (Section 13, T. 7, R. 18) under the Homestead Act in June, 1871, and he was an incorporator of that county's first town site of Stocktown township. McNulty subsequently read the law and commenced practice in town as a lawyer. Four of McNulty's brothers were also early settlers of Rooks County. Originally named Stocktown, as the McNulty brothers and many of the County's other early settlers were cattle dealers, the municipality is today known as Stockton, Kansas, and is the county seat of Rooks County.

== Career as legislator and lawman ==
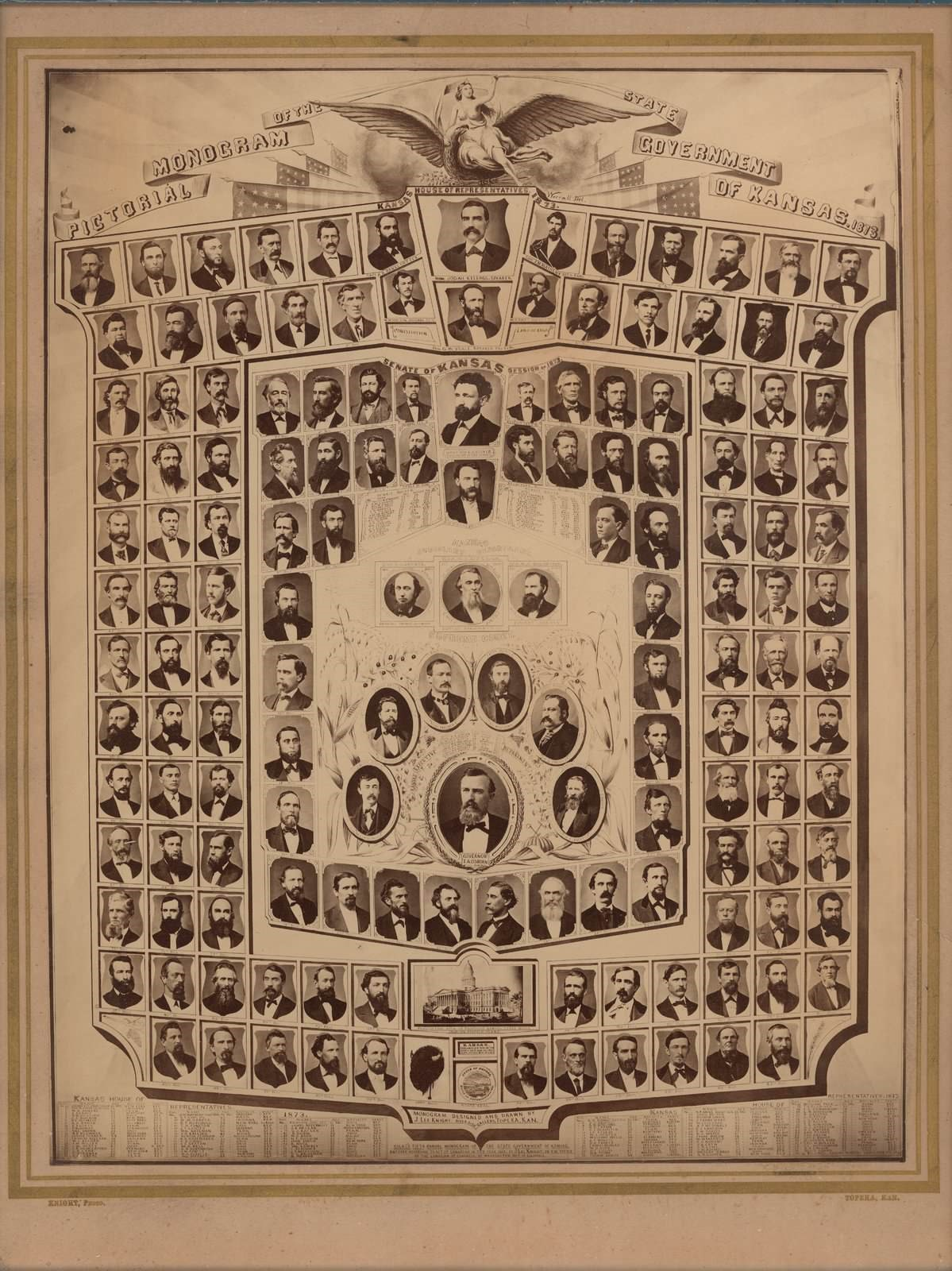
Kansas Legislature 1873

Joseph McNulty was elected to the Kansas House of Representatives on December 31, 1872, and he was seated as a member of its thirteenth annual or 1873 session. Joseph McNulty's younger brother Francis McNulty, also a lawyer, served as Rook County's representative in the Kansas House of Representatives in 1875. In 1874, Kansas Governor Thomas A. Osborn had appointed Joseph McNulty Sheriff of Rooks County to fill a vacancy until an elected sheriff could take office in 1875, and in the fall, McNulty was elected to the full 2-year term as sheriff.

Kansas was still quite lawless when McNulty served as sheriff. According to Blackmar's Kansas Cyclopedia on 7 June 1875, two men camped outside of Stockton and offered 35 ponies for sale. While one of the men rode into Stockton for supplies, Sheriff Joseph McNulty accompanied by an instigating Sheriff Alexander Ramsey of neighboring Ellis County, Kansas rode up heavily armed on the remaining man and announced that the ponies were stolen and ordered him to surrender. The suspected horse thief instead jumped behind his horse and drew his gun. Both Sheriff Ramsey and the suspected thief fired their pin guns simultaneously, killing each other. The other suspected horse thief was hunted and shot in the jaw but escaped. The ponies were recovered. Just some year earlier Sheriff Ramsey had wounded and captured Henry Born (1849-1921), "Dutch Henry", the most notorious "horse thief on the prairie frontier" after "an exciting chase". Sheriff Alexander Ramsey (1847-1875), who like Wild Bill Hickok shortly before him, had been first a city marshal of notorious Hays City, Kansas, in Ellis County and later sheriff of the county, had prior killed a total nine men while discharging his duties. He had "broke up" several bands of horse thieves about Hays City, gaining a local reputation.

Joseph McNulty was later permanently disabled (source says "crippled") when his horse fell over on him. McNulty, who had served with the Union Army to the rank of Quartermaster Sergeant during the U.S. Civil War, survived at least partially in his final years on an army "invalid" pension, which he received under the 1890 federal Disability Pension Act. His specific pension was increased by an Act of the U.S. Congress, effective January 14, 1907.

== See also ==
- List of Old West lawmen
