= Marguerite McNulty =

American actress

- Born: Marguerite McNulty; June 5, 1897; Kansas
- Died: August 22, 1982 (aged 85); Oakland, CA
- Occupation: Stage actress
- Known for: Suit against the scion William Andrews Clark III
- Notable work: Fifty Fifty, Ltd., The High Hatters, Ermine and Rhinestones

Marguerite McNulty, who was regularly referred to in press as a “beauty”, was a U.S. stage actress. For decades in the early 20th century, she was cast in musical and other comedy productions on Broadway theatre, like the musical comedy Fifty Fifty, Ltd. (1919) and the Broadway farce The High Hatters (1928). McNulty was also cast in a single silent film, 1925's Ermine and Rhinestones. She was born in 1897 to Thomas Henry McNulty and Chloe Flora McNulty (née Sullivan) in Coffeeville, Kansas. In late 1925 she had filed suit against the scion William Andrews Clark III, the third grandson of the then very recently late railroad and mining magnate, financier, and U.S. Senator William A. Clark of Montana. McNulty's claim against the younger Clark was for his allegedly having breached his promise to marry her, which greatly surprised and disturbed his other girlfriend whom he had also promised to marry at the time (an 18 year old New York dancer named Katya Minnasian). For several years prior, McNulty had a romantic relationship with Clark III, which his family successfully discouraged. When the lawsuit was filed, Clark fled to South Africa to get away from the publicity, while Miss Minassian claimed that their betrothal was still on.

McNulty spent the majority of her adult life in San Francisco and performed in numerous stage plays with her older brother Ancyn T. McNulty (1892-1925), who was also a well known theatrical actor and producer/director.
