= Anthony F. McNulty =

American politician

A.F. McNulty of Olyphant, Pennsylvania in Lackawanna County, Pennsylvania served a term in the Pennsylvania House of Representatives from 1881 to 1882. A Democrat, McNulty defeated David McDonald for the seat, receiving 2,262 votes to McDonald's 1,775. As the Democratic Party (USA) Representative from the 8th District for Luzerne County, Pennsylvania and Lackawanna County, Pennsylvania during the House's 1881 Session, McNulty sat on the House's standing committees for Iron and Coal Companies, Bureau of Statistics and Centennial Affairs.
