= David L. McNulty =

David L. McNulty is a U.S. Marshal. He was nominated for full U.S. Senate confirmation to the office in 2011 by U.S. President Barack Obama upon recommendation of Senator Charles Schumer of New York. McNulty is the U.S. Marshal U.S. Marshals Service for the Northern District of New York. A former Major and 33-year veteran with the New York State Police, McNulty was Section Head of the Bureau of Criminal Investigation (BCI), where he assisted with the command of over 1300 BCI police personnel. He joined the New York State Police as a trooper in 1978. McNulty received his B.A. and M.A. from the University of Albany. He led the U.S. Marshals Service response to the highly televised escape of murders Richard Matt and David Sweat from the Clinton County Correctional Facility in Dannemora N.Y. in June 2015. Quite possibly the largest manhunt in state history involving close to 1500 law enforcement personnel. The U.S. Marshals Service efforts were in cooperation with the New York State Police and a host of other local, state and federal agencies throughout this extensive 23 day manhunt that ultimately led to the fatal shooting of Richard Matt and the shooting and capture of David Sweat.
