= 1880 Garret Rock May Day riot =

Civil disorder in New Jersey, United States

- The societies greeting the rising sun with songs on Garret Mountain (Frank Leslie's Illustrated Newspaper, 22 May 1880)
- Date: May 1, 1880
- Location: Paterson, New Jersey, U.S.
- Methods: Demonstration, riot
- Result: Riot suppressed

Parties
Laborers	Paterson Police Department

Casualties
- Death: 1
- Injuries: Several
- Arrested: Dozens

The 1880 Garret Rock May Day riot or 1880 Garret Mountain May Day riot was a civil disorder event in New Jersey that harshly protested oligarchical power.

== Riot ==
Dalzell firing upon the besieging rioters at his dwelling, after they had fired his barn (Frank Leslie's Illustrated Newspaper, 1880)

For many years Paterson, New Jersey’s mostly Catholic German immigrant community had gathered at Garret Rock, a large plateau at the summit of Garret Mountain in Passaic County, New Jersey, near Paterson in continuation of the ancient German spring festival of "Maying" or ascending a mountain to sing in the rising sun of the first Sunday of May. Fully 3,000 people were gathered upon the plateau by sunrise May Day, 1880. In progress to the festival, a group of the celebrants crossed upon the property of Mr. Dalzell, a local merchant, whereupon Dalzell's son Robert ordered the inebriated, rowdy trespassers off the property. A grappling then ensued between Robert and a locally popular 19-year-old newlywed, Joseph J. Van Houten, during which altercation the elder Dalzell shot Van Houten in the abdomen with a shotgun, killing him. On hearing the shotgun's report, large portions of the celebrants advanced down the mountain to find Van Houghton shot dead. Dalzell and his son retreated to the curtilage on the property, where they were arrested by a local constable. The growing crowd, which was set upon the pair's lynching, torched the barn. The elder Dalzell fired indiscriminately upon the crowd wounding a little boy and girl and further inciting the mob, whereupon the constable and his prisoners retreated from the blazing barn to the farm's main house, which the crowd surrounded. After pelting the house for a time with rocks and bricks, the crowd – still intent upon smoking out the Dalzells and hanging them – set it aflame, and the constable and the Dalzells were obliged to again flee to a second house. Paterson's mayor and sheriff arrived on the scene just as the main house was being put to the torch. By this time, some 10,000 enraged Paterson residents occupied the countryside.

With the sheriff's meager forces unable to themselves control the crowd, Paterson's Mayor Graham and Sheriff Van Voorhies called upon the greatly revered Paterson Catholic priest William N. McNulty, whose exhortations to the crowd were enough to temporarily quell or distract that mob, while sheriff's deputies removed the constable and the Dalzells from the rear of the second house and placed them in a transport coach. To prevent the passengers stoning, McNulty then mounted the roof of the coach. Some few of the mob did still chase and jump onto the sides of the coach as it swiftly fled the scene, but were clubbed off by the constables.

New Jersey Governor McClellan had readied several companies of the state's military forces at Newark, New Jersey, under General Plume, but the order for the militia was ultimately countermanded.
