= Michael McNulty =

American politician (born 1947)

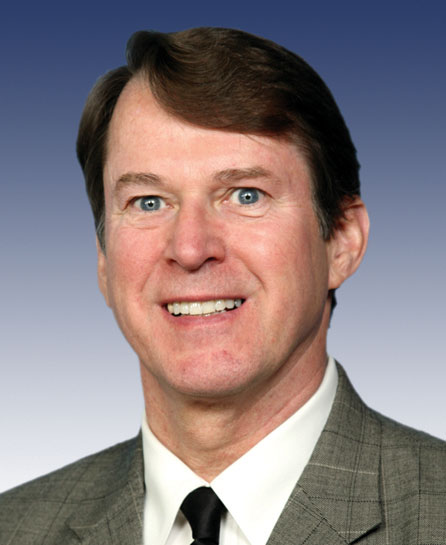
- Official portrait, 110th Congress

Member of the U.S. House of Representatives from New York
- In office January 3, 1989 – January 3, 2009
- Preceded by: Samuel S. Stratton
- Succeeded by: Paul Tonko
- Constituency: 23rd district (1989–93); 21st district (1993–2009)

Member of the New York State Assembly from the 106th district
- In office January 1, 1983 – December 31, 1988
- Preceded by: Neil W. Kelleher
- Succeeded by: Ronald Canestrari

Personal details
- Born: September 16, 1947 (age 79) Troy, New York, U.S.
- Party: Democratic
- Spouse: Nancy McNulty
- Relatives: John J. McNulty Jr. (father)
- Education: College of the Holy Cross (BA)

Michael Robert McNulty (born September 16, 1947) is a retired American politician from the U.S. state of New York. He served in the United States House of Representatives from 1989 to 2009 representing New York's Capital District and was chairman of the House Subcommittee on Social Security in the 110th Congress.

== Early life, education, and early political career ==
McNulty was born in Troy, New York and attended Troy public schools. He attended the La Salle Institute and graduated from St. Joseph's Institute in 1965. He attended Loyola University Rome Center in Rome, Italy from 1967 to 1968. In 1969, McNulty graduated from the College of the Holy Cross in Worcester, Massachusetts.

McNulty is a member of the third generation of Catholic, Irish-American family long prominent in Capital District politics. His grandfather, Jack McNulty Sr., was chairman of the Green Island, New York Democratic Party from 1919 to 1969 and Albany County Sheriff, and McNulty's father, Jack Jr., followed Jack Sr. as chairman. and also served as sheriff.

Michael McNulty worked as an insurance broker before entering politics. He was first elected to public office in November 1969 as Green Island's town supervisor; at 22, he was the youngest town supervisor in the state. In 1976, he ran for a seat in the New York State Assembly in the 106th Assembly District. He lost to Republican incumbent Neil Kelleher 55%-46%. A year later, he succeeded his father as chairman of the Green Island Democratic Party and was also elected as mayor of the village of Green Island, a post he held until 1982.

== New York State Assembly ==
After redistricting in 1982, Assemblyman Neil W. Kelleher, of the old 106th District, ran in the new 100th Assembly District, and McNulty ran in the new 106th. McNulty was a member of the New York State Assembly from 1983 to 1988, sitting in the 185th, 186th, and 187th New York State Legislatures.

== U.S. House of Representatives ==
=== Elections ===
In 1988, U.S. Congressman Samuel S. Stratton of New York's 23rd congressional district announced his withdrawal from the race due to health issues. McNulty was selected to replace him on the ballot. He was elected handily in what was then one of the few reliably Democratic areas in Upstate New York. He was reelected nine more times without serious difficulty. The district was renumbered as the 21st District after the 1990 census.

In 2004, he was challenged by Republican/Libertarian Warren Redlich, who ran for governor in 2010. McNulty faced Redlich again in 2006 and was reelected with 78% of the vote: his widest margin. He also had a primary challenge in 1996 by Lee H. Wasserman, in which he won by a closer margin than he ever had in the general election.

In October 2007, McNulty announced that he wouldn't seek an 11th term in Congress. Paul Tonko, who had served alongside McNulty in the State Assembly from 1983 to 1989, won the Democratic nomination to replace McNulty, and subsequently won the general election in November. Despite being an open seat, this was not considered a competitive election, as the 21st is considered the most Democratic district in the state outside of the New York City-based districts and Western New York. Both Congressional Quarterly and the Cook Political Report rated the race for the 21st's open seat as "Safe Democratic."

Tonko won the Democratic primary on September 9, defeating four other candidates. In the November 4 general election, Tonko defeated Republican Schenectady County Legislator James Buhrmaster by a decisive margin.

=== Tenure ===
==== Positions ====
McNulty is a moderate Democrat by New York standards. He voted for the War in Iraq, but since changed his stance and cosponsored Representative John Murtha's resolution for a phased withdrawal from the region.

==== Controversies ====
McNulty presided over a vote to recommit an agricultural appropriations bill on the night of August 2, 2007 that would have prevented illegal immigrants from receiving food stamps. McNulty claimed the vote tied 214–214 with members changing their votes after time had expired, although he gaveled down a vote and tallied it 212–216 against the motion, while Republicans argued the House screen tally vote was 215–213 in favor to recommit. Republicans chanted "Shame" and later walked out of the House in protest. McNulty and House Majority Leader Steny Hoyer apologized on the floor the next morning for prematurely gaveling down the vote. In May 2008, a bipartisan investigation panel including Bill Delahunt and Mike Pence began working to determine whether the vote had been tallied correctly and what action should be taken, if any. A year later, the panel found that the Democrats did indeed improperly tally the vote.

==== Rankings/endorsements ====
He was consistently endorsed by both the Conservative Party and the Working Families Party, third parties in New York.

McNulty received an "A" on the Drum Major Institute's 2005 Scorecard on middle-class issues.

=== Committee assignments ===
- Ways & Means Committee
  - Subcommittee on Social Security (chairman)
  - Subcommittee on Income Security and Family Support
- At-Large Whip

U.S. House of Representatives
Preceded by Samuel S. Stratton	Member of the U.S. House of Representatives from New York's 23rd congressional district 1979–2005	Succeeded by Sherwood Boehlert
Preceded by Hamilton Fish IV	Member of the U.S. House of Representatives from New York's 21st congressional district 1993–2009	Succeeded by Paul Tonko
U.S. order of precedence (ceremonial)
Preceded by Roscoe Bartlett as Former U.S. Representative	Order of precedence of the United States as Former USU.S.Representative	Succeeded by James T. Walsh as Former U.S. Representative
