= Robert W. McNulty =

Robert W. McNulty (1897-1966) was a dental educator. He was president of the American Dental Education Association in 1960 (a title changed to Chairman of the Board of Directors of the American Dental Education Association in 2013).

== Biography ==
Born in Braidwood, Illinois, McNulty graduated D.D.S. from Chicago's Loyola University School of Dentistry in 1926. He later in the 1940s served as dean of the Loyola University Dental School and as a president of the Illinois State Dental Society, becoming a nationally known author and lecturer on the problems of dental education.

From 1950 till 1965 when he retired, Dr. McNulty was Dean of Los Angeles' USC Dental School. The USC Dental School's Robert W. McNulty Memorial Award for Scholastic Achievement is named in his honor. The Loyola University School of Dentistry inducted Dr. McNulty as the 11th member of its Hall of Fame.

McNulty was a Fellow of the American College of Dentists and a member of the American Academy of Dental History.
