= Isaiah W. Lees =

- Lees c. 1898
- Born: Isaiah Wrigley Lees; December 25, 1830; Lancashire, England
- Died: December 21, 1902 (aged 71); San Francisco, California

Isaiah Wrigley Lees (December 25, 1830 – December 21, 1902) was the Chief of Police of San Francisco.

== Biography ==
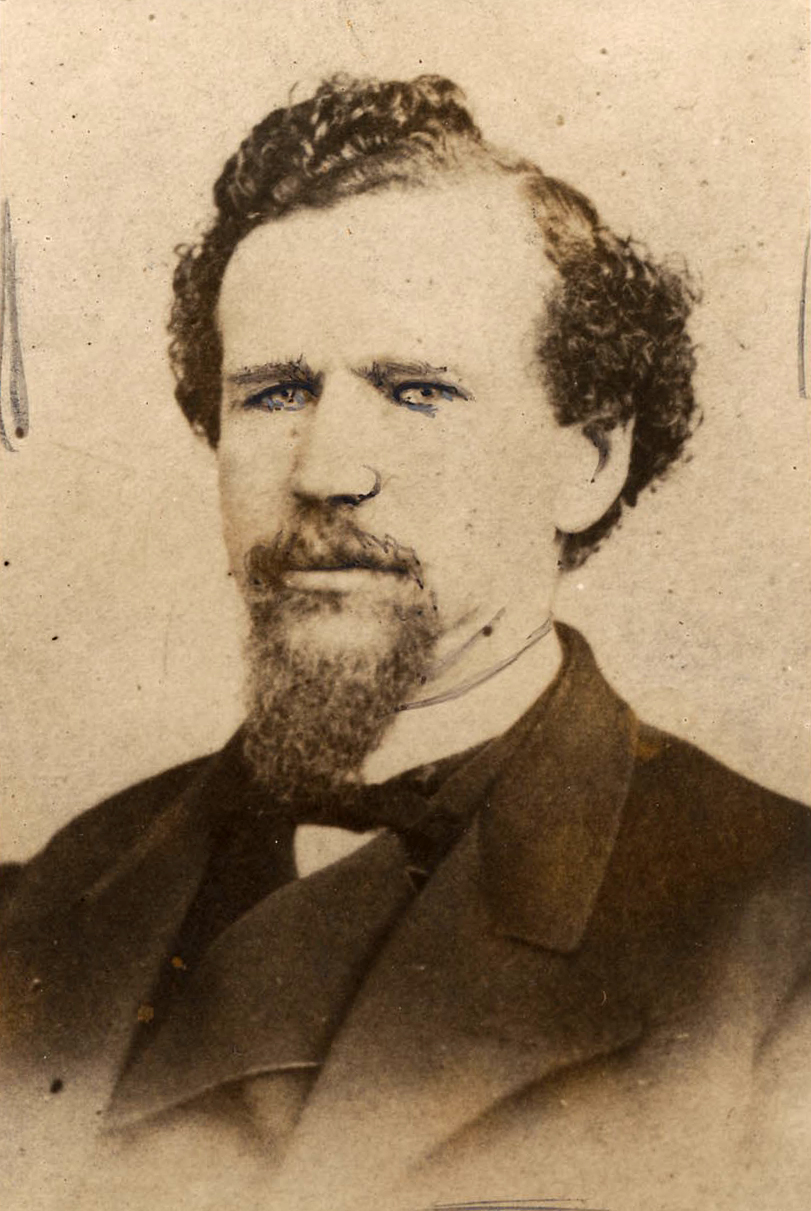
Lees earlier in his career

Lees was born in Lancashire, England on Christmas Day, December 25, 1830.

A former engineer, he sailed to San Francisco aboard the Mary Francis, arriving on December 20, 1848, and arrived before the Gold Rush. Lees was first hired by the San Francisco Police Department in 1854 and promoted to captain in 1858. He served continuously forty-seven years, retiring in January 1900. He eventually became Captain of Detectives and served as Chief of Police of San Francisco from 1897 to 1900, and later as Police Commissioner. As a criminal officer, he traveled to Scotland Yard several times and his picture hangs there, representing one of the great criminal officers of his day. It was Captain Lees who founded the Rogues' Gallery, using his own money to make the original collection of pictures.

He died on December 21, 1902, in San Francisco, California, president of the Veteran Police Association. He and his wife had five children, two of whom survived him.
