= McNulty, Oregon =

Unincorporated community in the state of Oregon, United States

- Unincorporated community
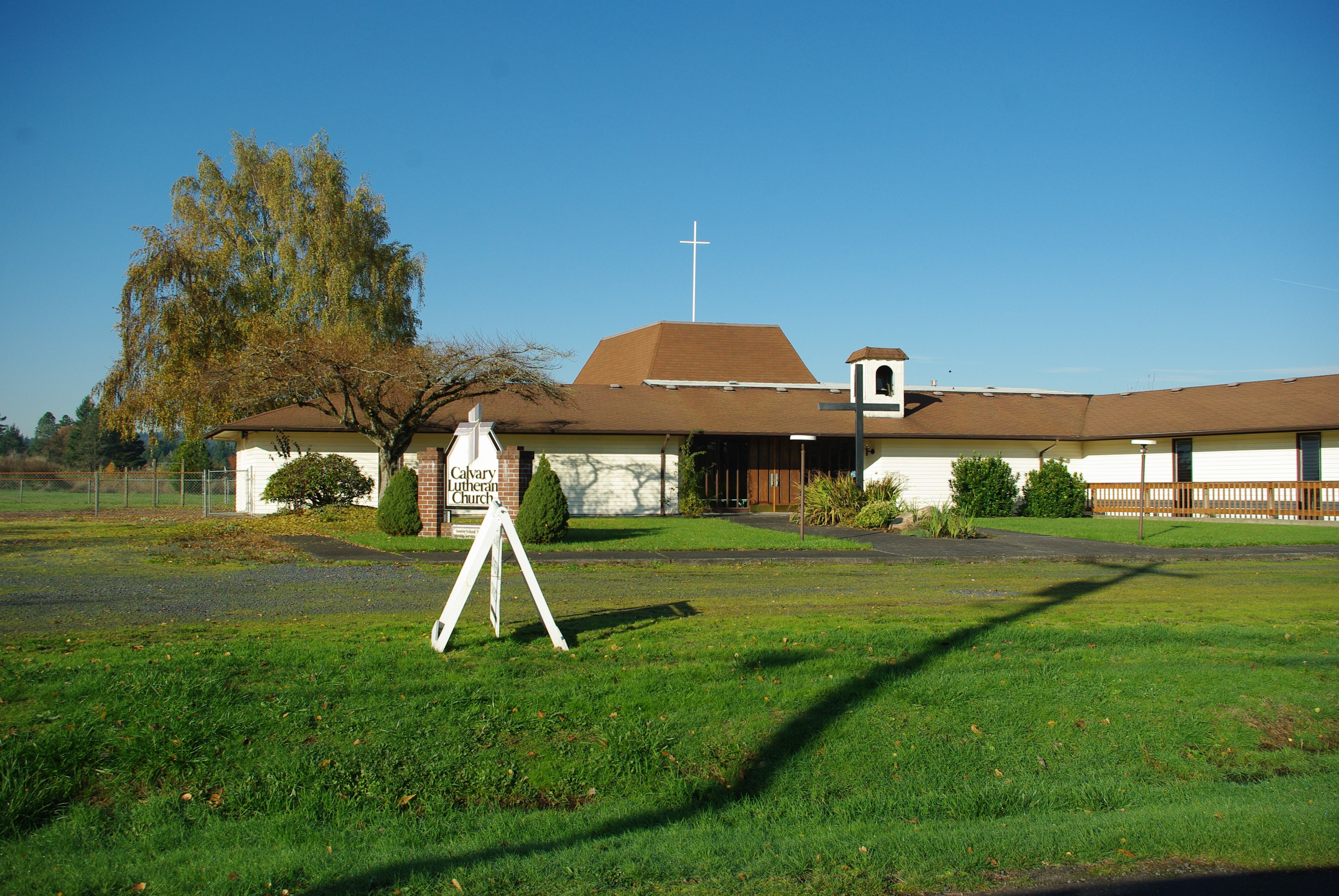
- Calvary Lutheran Church at McNulty

- Location within Oregon Location within the United States
- Coordinates: 45.84°N 122.842°W
- Country: United States
- State: Oregon
- County: Columbia
- Elevation: 115 ft (35 m)
- Time zone: UTC-8 (Pacific (PST))
  - Summer (DST): UTC-7 (PDT)
- ZIP code: 97053
- Area codes: 503 and 971

McNulty is an unincorporated community in Columbia County, Oregon, United States. It was named for Columbia River steamboat captain John McNulty, a pioneer riverboatman of the Pacific Northwest.
