= McNulty Lake =

- Location within Arkansas Location within the United States
- Location: Lee County, Arkansas
- Coordinates: 34°42′23″N 90°57′40″W
- Type: Lake
- Basin countries: United States
- Surface elevation: 174 ft (53 m)

McNulty Lake is a lake located in Lee County, Arkansas, United States between Little Rock, Arkansas and Memphis, Tennessee near Marianna, Arkansas.
