= Joe McNulty =

Irish footballer

Personal information
- Full name: Joseph McNulty
- Date of birth: 17 July 1923
- Place of birth: Dundalk, Ireland
- Date of death: 1986 (aged 62 or 63)
- Position: Goalkeeper

Senior career*
Years	Team	Apps	(Gls)
- Ards
1949–1952	Burnley	8	(0)
1952–1953	Sheffield United	0	(0)
1953–1954	Bangor		
1954–1955	Crusaders		
1955	Dundalk		
- New York Hakoah
- * Club domestic league appearances and goals

Joseph McNulty (17 July 1923 – 1986) was an Irish professional footballer who played as a goalkeeper. He played eight matches in the Football League for Burnley, with his league debut coming in the 1–2 defeat to Manchester United on 24 March 1951.

He later played for Bangor, Crusaders and Dundalk.
