= Francis McNulty (Kansas politician) =

American politician

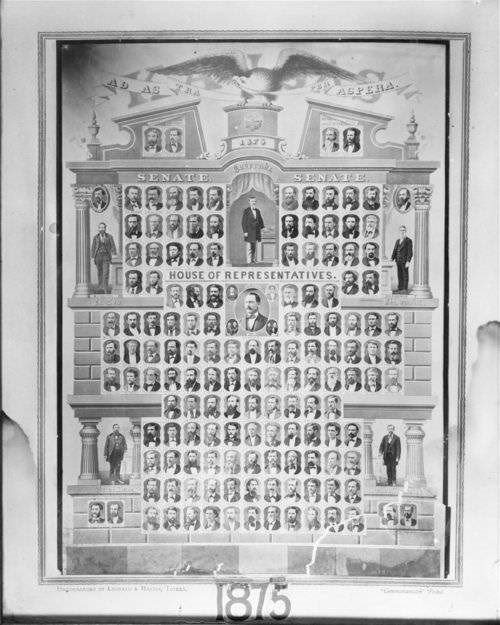
Kansas State Legislature 1875

Francis McNulty (born 1842 or 1846 - died 1885) was an American pioneer and a member of the Kansas Legislature in 1875. One of five Canadian born brothers (the others being James McNulty, Thomas McNulty, Joseph McNulty, and John McNulty), who were the first to settle Rooks County, Kansas in January 1871, Francis, a lawyer, was in November, 1874 elected to a term in the Kansas House of Representatives. He was present as a member of the Kansas House of Representatives for Rook's County for the House's fifteenth annual session, which opened on January 12, 1875. The McNulty brothers erected Stockton Township's, today, Stockton, Kansas, and Rook County's first house, a lodging establishment, in February, 1871 and the first child born in Rooks County was Myrtle Maud McNulty, born to Thomas McNulty and his wife Mary Dillon on Christmas evening 1871.
