= Thomas F. McNulty =

American politician (1906–1995)

Member of the Maryland House of Delegates from Baltimore City's 3rd district
- In office 1942–1946

Personal details
- Born: 1906 East Baltimore, Maryland, U.S.
- Died: February 1, 1995 (aged 88–89) Towson, Maryland, U.S.
- Party: Democratic
- Spouse: Marie M.
- Education: Peabody Conservatory of Music
- Alma mater: Baltimore City College

Thomas Francis McNulty (1906 – February 1, 1995) was an American radio broadcasting executive, author, and politician. He was the owner of Belvedere Broadcasting Corporation from the 1950s to 1987 and served as president in the 1960s. He served as a member of the Maryland House of Delegates, representing the 3rd District of Baltimore, from 1942 to 1946.

== Early life ==
McNulty was born in East Baltimore in 1906. He attended parochial schools and was a 1926 graduate at the Baltimore City College. He also attended the Peabody Conservatory of Music.

== Career ==
After working as a typesetter, newspaper reporter and bank runner, he became an insurance broker in the late 1920s. In 1953, he founded Charg-It of Baltimore, the first non-store credit card available to Baltimore residents and served as chairman of the board until 1957. In the mid-1950s, he bought Belvedere Broadcasting Corp., the owner of WWIN Radio, selling it in 1987 when he retired. He was president of the Belvedere Broadcasting Company (WWIN-FM Baltimore) in the 1960s.

In 1949, the McNultys and parents of eight other intellectually disabled children founded the Maryland Society for Mentally Retarded Children, today known as The Arc Baltimore. In the 1950s, the McNultys helped establish the St. Francis School for Special Education, which was previously located on Maryland Avenue in Baltimore. Their experiences led the McNultys to write a booklet titled "Happily Raising a Retarded Child" to help parents in similar circumstances.

He was a member of numerous organizations, including the Hibernian Society, the Friendly Sons of St. Patrick, the Baltimore Country Club and Boumi Temple.

McNulty was a Democratic member of the Maryland House of Delegates representing its Baltimore City 3rd District from 1942 to 1946.

== Death ==
The McNultys owned a winter home in Fort Lauderdale, Florida. McNulty died from cancer at the Blakehurst Life Care Community (now known as Blakehurst Senior Living) in Towson, Maryland, on February 1, 1995.
