= John F. McNulty =

American businessman and politician

John F. McNulty (1891 or 1896–1984) was a Baltimore businessman, who served as a Democratic member of the Maryland House of Delegates from Anne Arundel County, Maryland for 17 years. He was a member of the Maryland House of Delegates from 1946 to 1954 and again from 1959 to 1966. A World War I veteran and 1916 graduate of the University of Maryland, McNulty served in the United States Navy from 1916 to 1919 to the rank of Lt (j.g.). Throughout his legislative career, McNulty took a keen interest in veteran's affairs and welfare. American Legion Post 298 in Charlotte Hall, Maryland is named "John F. McNulty Memorial Post 298" in his honor.

McNulty was a member of the Democratic Party.
