= John J. McNulty =

American politician

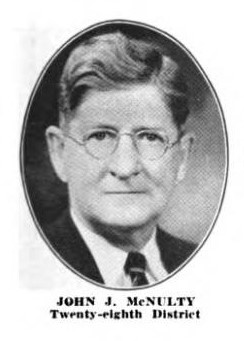
1941 Minnesota Legislature official portrait photograph of McNulty.

John J. McNulty (1881 or 1883–1947) was a Minnesota politician. He was member of the Minnesota Legislature for ten terms.

== Career ==
He was initially elected as a nonpartisan member of the Minnesota House of Representatives on November 6, 1928. McNulty was subsequently re-elected, again as a nonpartisan candidate, to nine consecutive two-year terms as a representative. He served during the State's 46th through 55th legislative sessions. From 1913 to 1974, Minnesota law mandated that its legislators be elected on Minnesota nonpartisan ballots. The legislators then caucused as "Liberals" or "Conservatives". Under this system, McNulty, who was affiliated with the American Federation of Labor, caucused with the "Liberals."

== Personal life ==
McNulty was a barber by occupation and, later in life, a widowed father of six children. He served only having had a public and parochial school education ("at least elementary school"). McNulty died on February 10, 1947, shortly after being sworn in as representative for the 28th District, Hennepin County, Minnesota, for a 10th term. McNulty's wife Helen died in 1943.

== See also ==
- Laborism
