= James J. McNulty =

Former CEO of the Chicago Mercantile Exchange

James J. McNulty was C.E.O. of the Chicago Mercantile Exchange from 2000 to 2004. He administered the Exchange’s transition through demutualization to a publicly traded firm. His initial contract was not renewed by the Board, which had voted out the then Chairman who supported McNulty. Prior to assuming the positions of President and C.E.O. of the Chicago Mercantile Exchange, McNulty had 25 years experience in global financial markets. McNulty received a B.A. in liberal arts from the University of Illinois, Chicago and an M.A. in Anglo-Irish studies from University College, Dublin. In 2007, McNulty was inducted into the Future Industry Associations Future’s Hall of Fame. McNulty has nurtured press relations and a reputation as an "intellectual" (Crain's). McNulty joined the Board of Directors of NYSE Group, Inc. in 2005. Since 2008, he has been the Chairman of the Board of Directors of NYSE Liffe.
