= John McNulty (steamboat captain) =

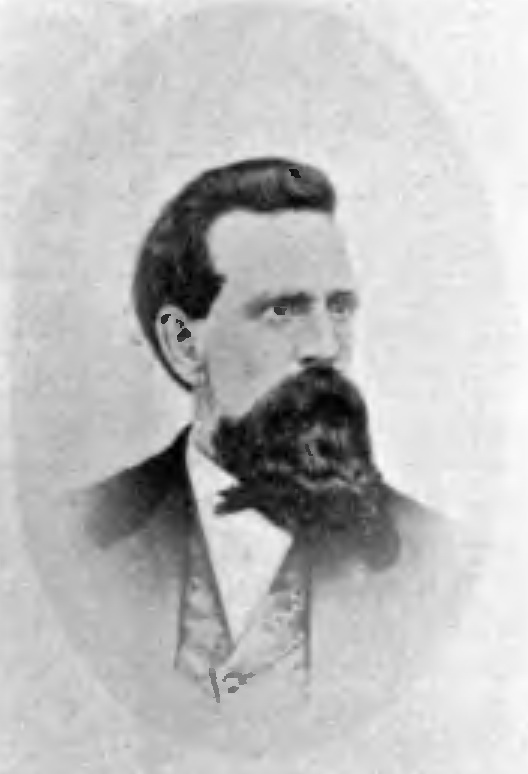
McNulty

John McNulty (fl. c. 1860) was a pioneer Columbia River steamboat captain.

== Career ==
John McNulty was born in Dublin, Ireland on March 21, 1830. He went to sea as a boy. After years of sailing the seas of the World, John McNulty landed in Portland, Oregon Territory in 1852. Almost immediately upon his arrival, he began steamboating the Pacific Northwest's rivers on the Fashion. From its founding in 1860, John McNulty was a steamboat captain for the Oregon Steam Navigation Company and for the Oregon Railway and Navigation Company. For some 3 decades, Capt. McNulty was entrusted with the companies’ steamboat runs on the treacherous middle river of the Columbia. There, then, the Columbia River's two most significant and dangerous rapids, the Cascades and The Dalles, followed one upon the other. Capt. McNulty was the first master of the R.R. Thompson on the middle river, and the Oregon Steam Navigation Company, near, continuously, entrusted its Idaho to Capt. McNulty's able command during its term on the middle river. It has been said that the U.S. state of Idaho, itself, was named for this formidable draft. In addition to the preceding biographical data for Captain McNulty there on same page noted, it is also said of Capt. McNulty in the Marine History of the Pacific Northwest that "His career has been exceedingly fortunate and free of accidents."

== Decline of River Transport ==
It was never thought safe to transport passengers, their property, ores or other freight over the Columbia River rapids. Portage of such cargo around the rapids was required, while the steamboat's captain and a skeleton crew slowly navigated the steamboat through the dangerous Casacades and Dalles. Towards the end of the 19th century, as the railroads began to span along the length of the Pacific Northwest's rivers and about their rapids, the heyday of the more risky and otherwise expensive steamboat river transport came to a close.

== Record Run of the R.R. Thompson through the Cascade Rapids ==
After the advancement of the railroads, the first steamboat to be taken off the River to operate in the still financially lucrative shipping on the lower Columbia River, Willamette River and Puget Sound was the R.R. Thompson. Capt. McNulty was ordered to take her through the Cascades to the lower Columbia River on June 3, 1882. Capt. McNulty took his trusted first officer, William Johnson, engineer, William Doran, and assistant George Fuller as crew.

McNulty, in transiting the Thompson to the lower river, showcased his astonishing talents as a riverboatman. No longer encumbered by his duties to passengers and freight shippers and theirs or their property's continued safe transport, he entered the treacherous Cascade rapids with the 215 foot long and 1158 gross ton R.R. Thompson, which was not a shallow craft, but had a significant hold depth of 9.5 ft exposed to the rapids concealed rock hazards and embankments, at full engine stroke. With its 38 ft beam and great girth, the Thompson was built for passenger comfort and to house a maximum of cargo. It was not built to be a fast driven boat even in calm waters.

The Thompson was a big boat for her day. Her two hundred and fifteen foot length and thirty-eight foot beam allowed for spacious passenger accommodations with ample room for freight. Passenger spaces were nicely fitted out and the ladies' cabin boasted carpets, plush settees, and polished panelled walls. The Thompson was not a fast boat. Rather she deliberately was built for comfort and truly qualified for such overblown adjectives as 'palace boat' and 'finest cuisine afloat,' whipped up by enthusiastic passenger agents of the day.

Capt. McNulty, though, ran the large R.R. Thompson through the hazards of the 6 mile long Cascades without incident in just 6 minutes and 40 seconds (approximately a mile a minute or 60mph). John McNulty's record set that day for minimal steamboat transit time through the Cascades rapids was never beaten, even by captains in command of smaller, more nimble steamboats. Captain James W. Troup was unsuccessful in his attempt to best Captain McNulty's record while Troup was in command of the Hassalo.

== Postscript ==
John McNulty's grave in St. Helens, Oregon has a historical marker. The U.S. community of McNulty, Oregon is named for this pioneer Pacific Northwest riverboat captain.
