= Francis McNulty Jr. =

American politician

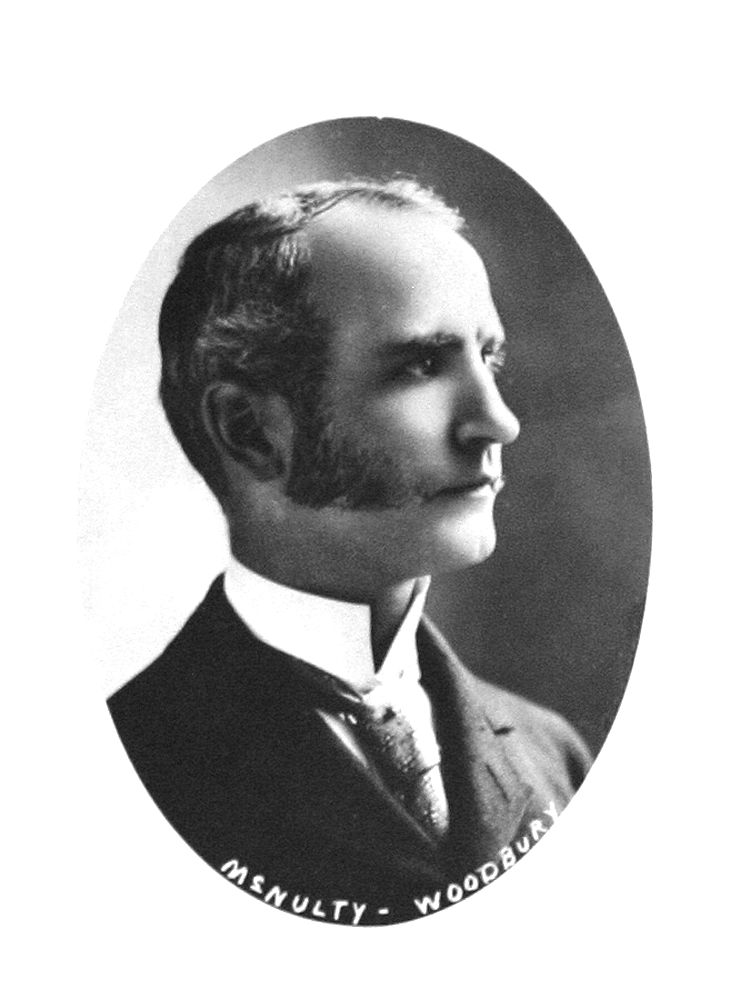
Hon. Francis McNulty Jr.

Francis McNulty Jr. was a Republican member of the Iowa House of Representatives from 1896 to 1898. Originally from Michigan where he graduated from the University of Michigan Law School at Ann Arbor, Michigan, McNulty removed to Sioux City, Iowa where he practiced law and served as a state representative in the Iowa General Assembly. He represented District 58 in Woodbury County, Iowa. Not a year after his term of office ended, after gold was discovered in Nome, Alaska (Cape Nome) in 1899, McNulty moved there. He practiced law in Nome, arguing cases before the United States District Court of the Territory of Alaska (Est. 1884). At least one of his successfully argued cases is published. In 1904, Republican Philander C. Knox, United States Attorney General in the Cabinets of both U.S. Presidents William McKinley and Theodore Roosevelt, and the 7 term U.S. Senator from Iowa (prior having served four terms as a U.S. Representative from the state) Republican William B. Allison both endorsed McNulty for appointment as U.S. Attorney for the District of Alaska. The position had been recently vacated by Marvin Grisby.
