= James F. McNulty (admiral) =

U.S. Merchant marine officer

James Francis McNulty (September 30, 1929 – November 14, 2006) was a U.S Maritime Service (USMS) rear admiral, a United States Navy captain, and an educator of both naval officers and Merchant Marine officers. He began his naval career in 1953 shortly after graduating from Massachusetts Maritime Academy with a B.S. in marine engineering. He served as a naval surface warfare officer for twenty-two years, which included service as commanding officer on destroyers, lead speechwriter for the chief of naval operations (Zumwalt), and culminated in his final position as chief of staff of the Naval War College in Newport, Rhode Island . He was a veteran of the Korean War and the Vietnam War. and retired from the U.S. Navy in 1977. As a firm believer in "giving back", he went on to serve the next generation as an educator and administrator in the United States Maritime Service, as academic dean at Maine Maritime Academy, head of the Marine Transportation Department at Texas A&M University Maritime Academy, and ultimately as superintendent of Great Lakes Maritime Academy.

== Early life, education and military career ==
McNulty was born in Lawrence, Massachusetts, and received a B.S. in marine engineering from Massachusetts Maritime Academy in 1953, the first in his family to earn a college degree. . While serving as an officer in the U.S. Navy, he received a B.A. in history from Tufts University, a master's degree in international affairs from George Washington University and an additional master’s degree in marine affairs from the University of Rhode Island. During his U.S. Navy career, McNulty served principally on destroyers. During the Vietnam War, he was executive officer of the guided missile destroyer USS Robison (DDG-12) and later was the commanding officer of the guided missile destroyer USS Farragut (DDG-37, formerly DLG-6) from May 10, 1972, to August 10, 1973. The USS Farragut was the lead ship of her Farragut class of 10 guided missile destroyers in the U.S. Fleet. As an accomplished naval combat commander, McNulty was thereafter appointed chief of staff of the Naval War College in Newport, Rhode Island.

McNulty's historical papers (1955–1977), are tactically implemented reference materials delivered on the subject of U.S. naval presence and specifically in regard to U.S. and Soviet sea power. Other of his published writings and personal papers, including notebooks and photographs, are archived in 10 boxes in the War College's Naval Historical Collection. The U.S. Naval War College's Naval Historical Collection's contents and collections of personal manuscripts are those "personal papers of naval officers or civilians who have been associated with the College during their careers and have made major contributions to the evolution of naval warfare."

After his retirement from the U.S. Navy in 1977, McNulty began a new career as an educator of merchant marine officers. He retired for good in 1993, as Superintendent of Great Lakes Maritime Academy. While serving as an educator and administrator, McNulty continued to train, lead, and mentor competent mariners for both active naval duty and commercial maritime service. His legacy and love of the sea and service continued long after his death. His daughter and son-in-law are both maritime academy graduates and are shipping industry executives; two of his grandsons were appointed to and graduated from the United States Merchant Marine Academy at Kings Point, New York (Cook, 2014, 2015); and a third McNulty grandson serves as a U.S Navy jet pilot (McNulty). Rear Admiral McNulty continued to publish articles about naval training well after retiring, for example in Proceedings magazine and others.

== Later life and death ==
McNulty retired with his wife Mary Grace McNulty (née Young) in Punta Gorda, Florida, where they enjoyed yachting and were involved with the Navy League of the United States. McNulty died at home in Punta Gorda on November 14, 2006. He is buried at Arlington National Cemetery. He was followed in death by his wife of 53 years on October 8, 2011. James F. McNulty and his wife Mary were Roman Catholics.

== Military awards ==
McNulty's military decorations and awards include:

Legion of Merit

Meritorious Service Medal

Navy and Marine Corps Commendation Medal with two 5/16" Gold Stars and Combat "V"

Combat Action Ribbon

Meritorious Unit Commendation

National Defense Service Medal with one 3/16" bronze star

Korean Service Medal with one 3/16" bronze star

Vietnam Service Medal with one 3/16" bronze star

Republic of Vietnam Campaign Medal with 1960- device

== Memorial scholarship ==
The Great Lakes Maritime Academy RADM J.F. McNulty Scholarship Fund is named for Rear Admiral McNulty.

== Papers ==
Rear Admiral McNulty began contributing papers to scholarly journals in 1962. Some of Rear Admiral McNulty's more influential papers on naval tactics, particularly, blockade tactics include:

- McNulty, James F. "Blockade: Evolution and Expectation", U.S. Naval War College Review, October 1966:65–98
- McNulty, James F., "Naval presence-the misunderstood mission", U.S. Naval War College Review, Vol. 27 No. 2, Sept.-Oct. 1974, pp. 21–31
- McNulty, James F. 'Blockade: Evolution and Expectation', International Law Studies, Volume 62 (1980) pp. 172–196

The papers remain relevant.

=== Citations to the papers ===
Among the publications on naval tactics citing to one or more of these of Rear Admiral McNulty's papers over the ensuing 35–50 years are ...

- Academie De Droit International de la Haye (Ed.), Recueil Des Cours Collected Courses of the Hague Academy of International Law: 1993, p. 194 © 1994 Nowell, Massachusetts: Kluwer Academic Publishers ISBN 0-7923-3282-2
- Kenneth Booth, Navies and Foreign Policy © 2014 New York, New York: Routledge
- Bouchard, J.F. (1988) Use of Naval Force in Crises: A Theory of Stratified Crisis Interaction (Doctoral dissertation) Stanford University, Stanford, California
- Detter, I., The Law of War (2nd ed.), © 2000, New York, New York, Cambridge University Press, pp. 313, 341, 479 ISBN 0 521 78256 2
- Drew, P.J. (2012) An Analysis of the Legality of Maritime Blockade in the Context of Twenty First Century Humanitarian Law (Master's Thesis) Queens University, Kingston, Ontario, Canada
- Fumio, T. "The First War Plan Orange and the First Imperial Japanese Defense Policy: An Interpretation from the Geopolitical Strategic Perspective" NIDS Security Reports, No.5 (March 2004), pp. 68–103
- Hattendorf, J. B. and King, E.J. Naval War College Newport Papers (19) "The Evolution of the U.S. Navy's Maritime Strategy, 1977-1986" (1989) Newport, Rhode Island: Naval War College, p. 250, "McNulty, Cdr. James. 'Naval Presence: The Misunderstood Mission.' Naval War College Review (September–October 1974): 21–31. (Another reflection of the initial ZumwaltTurner focus on presence.)" ISBN 1-884733-32-8
- Christian Le Miere, Maritime Diplomacy in the 21st Century, Drivers and Challenges, © 2014 New York, New York: Routledge, Bibliography, p. 142 ISBN 978-0-415-82800-0
- Morabito, R.E. (1991) Maritime Interdiction the Evolution of a Strategy (Master's thesis), Naval War College, Newport, Rhode Island
- Olson, J.J., (1993) Naval Interdiction Considerations in the Use of Limited Naval Force in Operations Short of War (Master's thesis) Naval War College, Newport, Rhode Island'
- Papastavridis, E. The Interception of Vessels on the High Seas, Bibliography, p. 331, © 2013 Oxford: Heart Publishing ISBN 978-1-84946-183-2
- Preston, R.J., Jr. (1995) Maritime Interdiction: A Viable Tool for Today's CINC (Master's Thesis) Naval War College, Newport, Rhode Island
- Robertson, H.B, Ed., International Law Studies, Vol. 64 (1991), Chapter 5, 'The Commander's Handbook on the Law of Naval Operations', p. 149, "McNulty makes good sense, not only about the rules of blockade specifically but about the laws of neutrality in general when he writes about the legal and tactical climate after 1945 …"
- Schmitt, M.N. Essays on Law and War at the Fault Lines, Chapter 6 'Aerial Blockades in Historical, Legal, and Practical Perspective', © 2012 The Hague: Asser Press ISBN 978-90-6704-739-5 (Print) 978-90-6704-740-1 (Online)
