= McNulty rhyolite =

McNulty rhyolite is one of four intrusive, igneous geological formations, the Chalk Mountain nevadite, Lincoln porphyry, McNulty rhyolite and Quail porphyry, described, mapped, and named by S. F. Emmons in 1898 within the Tenmile Mining District of southern Summit County, Colorado. The McNulty rhyolite, which is also known as the McNulty Gulch rhyolite, is described by S. F. Emmons as a fine-grained porphyritic rhyolite that is light gray in color and contains many small white feldspars and locally some small smoky quartz crystals. He mapped it as being exposed as small irregular masses in McNulty Gulch and southward beyond the area of the Tenmile Mining District that was mapped at the time. One exposure above the Railroad Boy tunnel, his location 45 in McNulty Gulch, exhibited small drusy cavities containing little tablets of tridymite. He proposed that this rhyolite was either intruded contemporaneously withy or later than the Chalk Mountain nevadite at the time of eruption. Based on field mapping, the McNulty rhyolite was interpreted to cross-cut and post-date the Lincoln and the Quail porphyries. Later geologic mapping in the Tenmile Mining District eliminated the McNulty rhyolite as a recognized geologic formation.

In later geologic mapping of the McNuly Gulch - Ten Mile Mining District region, both Butler and others and Bergendahl and Koschmann interpret what was previously mapped by S. F. Emmons as the Lincoln porphyry, McNulty rhyolite and Quail porphyry as a single layer of igneous rock that they map as the Lincoln porphyry. This layer is interpreted as an igneous sill that has intruded between sedimentary layers composing the Minturn Formation. Although the original exposures of McNulty rhyolite are now largely buried by mine waste from the Climax Mine, the remaining exposures are now mapped as Quartz monzonite porphyry - megacrystic variety (Eocene).

According to the geologic mapping and interpretations of Widmann and others, their unnamed quartz monzonite porphyry typically consists of light-gray to light bluish-gray quartz monzonite porphyry. It contains large phenocrysts (megacrysts) of orthoclase and in many places, rounded bipyramids of quartz. These phenocrysts are surrounded by a porphyritic matrix of grains of plagioclase, quartz, orthoclase, and abundant biotite and a bluish-gray aphanitic matrix. This quartz monzonite porphyry, which includes the former McNuly rhyolite, was formerly correlated with the Lincoln porphyry based on similarity of appearance. However, radiometric ages obtained from the Lincoln and quartz monzonite porphyries and accompanying field relations indicate that the Lincoln porphyry (66 to 67 million years old) is in fact much older than the quartz monzonite porphyry (42 to 43 million years old).

== McNulty Gulch and Tenmile Mining District ==
McNulty Gulch is a part of the western United States’ and Colorado's gold rush history, being the 1861 site of one of the earliest gold finds in Colorado. The first commercial gold placers in Colorado were only discovered by George A. Jackson in nearby areas of Colorado 2 years earlier in 1858. These discoveries precipitated a rush of prospectors into the surrounding mountains and the Colorado Gold Rush commenced. During 1858-67, Colorado produced about $14,924,000 in placer gold and about $10 million in lode gold at mid 19th century values.

Within the Tenmile Mining district, the primary ore horizons do not lie within the unnamed quartz monzonite porphyry, which includes the McNulty rhyolite. Instead, the ore occurs primarily as sulfide replacement deposits found within thin beds of Pennsylvanian-Permian limestone, which occur in the Minturn formation. Minor, typically uneconomic, ore deposits occur as sulfide veins in siliceous rocks.
