= William N. McNulty =

Irish-American Catholic priest

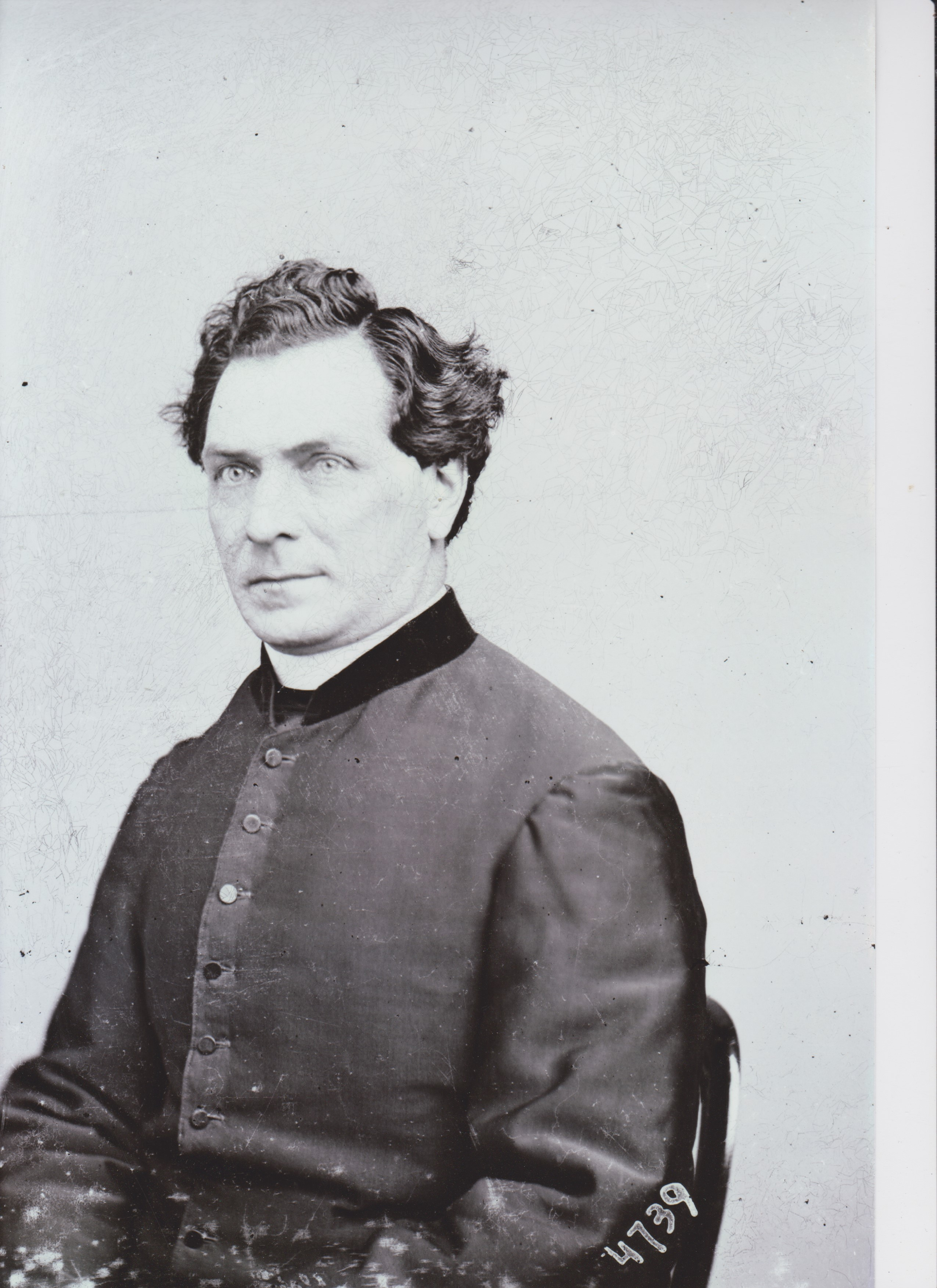
Reverend Father William N. McNulty c. 1855. Photographic negative with notations is part of the Mathew Brady Collection housed at the United States Library of Congress.

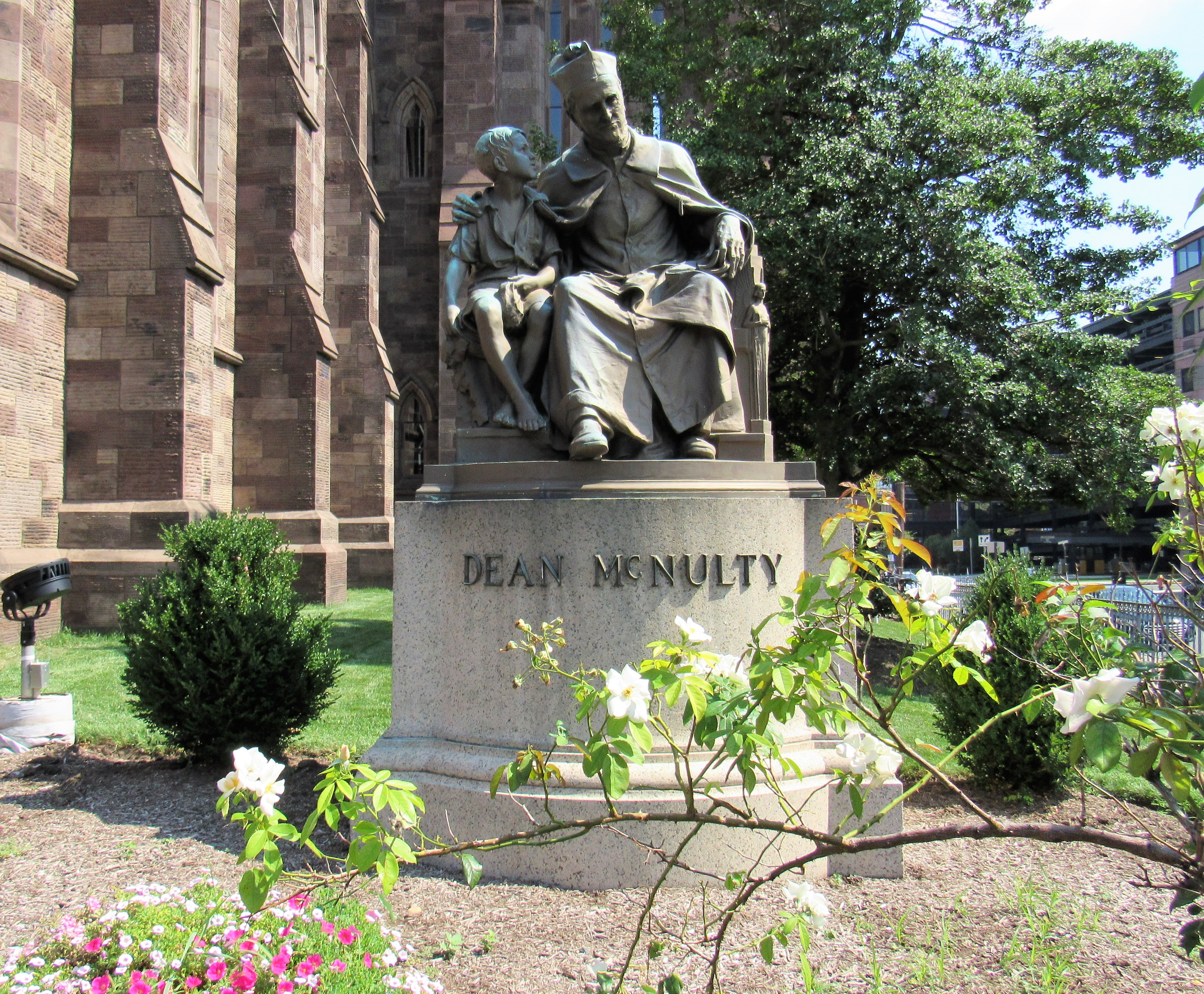
Dean McNulty memorial at the Cathedral of St. John the Baptist

William N. McNulty (1829–1922) was an American Catholic priest and dean, who arrived in New York from his native Ballyshannon, Ireland, in 1850, during the Great Famine. In the mid nineteenth century, there few Catholic facilities in Passaic County, New Jersey. He is responsible for much of the foundation of the structural and institutional infrastructure of the Catholic Church's presence in Paterson, New Jersey. Towards the later years of his career, he was offered but refused the Pope's appointment of himself as domestic prelate. McNulty, sometimes called "Father Mac", represented the moral authority within the Irish and German Catholic communities in Paterson. Contemporary reports credit McNulty with helping to diffuse the 1880 Garret Rock May Day riot when he addressed the rioters. During his lifetime, the Pope named him to the office of papal chamberlain, an office typically reserved for European nobility. McNulty was buried in front of Paterson's St. John's Church under a bronze monument which depicts him counseling a parish youth.

== Contribution to local Catholic infrastructure ==
Throughout his 65-year career, McNulty acted as the moving force behind the creation of much of the foundation of Paterson, New Jersey's Catholic churches and institutions, including St. John (later in 1937 upon that Diocese's formation renamed Cathedral Church of the Diocese of Paterson), St. Joseph, St. Agnes, St. Mary, Our Lady of Victories, St. Michael and St. Ann's Churches, Holy Sepulcher Cemetery, St. Joseph's Hospital, St. Agnes Institute Girls' School, St. Francis Home for Working Girls, the Home for the Indigent Poor and Aged, Mt. St. Joseph's Home for Boys and convents for Dominican and orders of teaching sisters.

== 1880 Garret Rock May Day riot ==
McNulty was so revered by the Irish and German Catholic communities of Paterson that his appearance at the 1880 Garret Rock May Day rioting – at request of then Paterson Mayor Graham and Sheriff Van Voorhies – was enough to diffuse the mob to the point where the constabulary could act to end the rioting.

== Later life ==
In 1908, McNulty was presented a purse of $24,000 for his personal use on the occasion of his golden jubilee in the priesthood. He used the funds to build the Mount St. Joseph Home for Boys. Throughout his service as a parish priest, he would often use his stipend to help feed hungry families within his parish or help pay the college tuition of poor parish youth. He was also known for maintaining the church's food and housing funds by wresting pay envelopes from reprobate parishioners before they could spend them in Paterson's bars. It is said that Paterson's barkeeps came to fear the Reverend Father more than they did the police or mob.

== Ku Klux Klan funeral protest ==
When McNulty died in 1922 at the age of 93, Paterson Mayor Frank J. Van Noort declared the day of his funeral a holiday, closing both parochial and secular schools and ordering flags to be flown at half mast. This was met with protests from the Ku Klux Klan on the grounds that such honors violated separation of church and state.

== See also ==
- History of the Ku Klux Klan in New Jersey
