= Tim McNulty (politician) =

American politician

Pennsylvania Secretary of Community and Economic Development
- In office October 9, 2002 – January 20, 2003
- Governor: Mark Schweiker
- Preceded by: Sam McCullough
- Succeeded by: Dennis Yablonsky

Personal details
- Party: Republican Party (USA)
- Education: University of Illinois, Chicago

Tim McNulty was Pennsylvania Secretary of Community and Economic Development, the DCED. 4 days after taking office on October 5, 2002, Pennsylvania Governor Mark Schweiker appointed the Chicago native to his Cabinet as acting DCED Secretary. Prior to this appointment, McNulty was Pennsylvania Governor Tom Ridge's chief of staff for technology initiatives. In this capacity, McNulty was responsible for guiding implementation of Governor Ridge's strategic technology initiatives. McNulty had been part of Gov. Ridge's job and community development team since 1995. From 1990 to 1994, Tim McNulty served as executive director of the Council of Great Lakes Governors.

Lt. Gov. Mark Schweiker assumed office as Governor of Pennsylvania, when Pennsylvania Governor Tom Ridge suddenly resigned his office in aftermath of the September 11, 2001, terrorist attacks to become Homeland Security Advisor to U.S. President George W. Bush. McNulty served with Governor Schweiker for the substantial balance of the term of office as governor to which Ridge had been elected. On Mark Schweiker's last full day of office as governor, that is on January 20, 2003, McNulty left government service to return to Carnegie Mellon University to act as the special assistant to its provost for strategic technology initiatives. Tim McNulty had worked at the university before entering government service.

McNulty received his B.A. from Indiana University and an M.A. in public policy from the University of Illinois at Chicago.
