= John F. McNulty Jr. =

U.S. Army officer (1917–2004)

Lt. Col. John F. McNulty Jr. (1917–2004), a recipient of the Bronze Star Medal, Combat Infantryman Badge and three U.S. Army Commendation Medals for meritorious service, was a Second World War combat veteran, who there during fought in France, Belgium and Germany. Later, in 1956, Lt. Col. McNulty served in Indochina as a U.S. military advisor to the French Army. McNulty rose first through the U.S. Army's enlisted and, then, its officers' ranks.

McNulty is better recognized, however, as a college administrator and, even more so, as a college athletic coach. After retiring from the U.S. Army in 1964, John McNulty was employed for 28 years, first, as the dean of students and, later, concurrently, as the athletic director at Johnson & Wales University in Providence, Rhode Island. Himself, an accomplished marathon runner, "The Colonel", as his students and particularly his student athletes knew him, also founded and personally coached the Johnson & Wales Athletic Club, which under McNulty's coaching produced several champion runners, including the Rhode Island U.S. educated Irishman John Treacy, a two-time world cross country champion and a silver medalist for the Republic of Ireland at the 1984 Summer Olympics held in Los Angeles, California U.S.A. McNulty Hall, a residence hall at Johnson & Wales University, is named for "The Colonel". Lt. Col. John F. McNulty Jr. is buried at the United States' Arlington National Cemetery. In the year 2000, McNulty, who had near singlehandedly built the Johnson & Wales University's powerful track and cross country programs of the 1960s and 1970s, became the first inductee into its newly created Athletic Hall of Fame.
