= James F. McNulty (chief executive) =

American businessman

James F. McNulty is the former chairman of the Board of Directors, chief executive officer and President of Pasadena, California's Parsons Corporation. He is a trustee of Pomona College.

McNulty graduated with a B.S. in engineering from the United States Military Academy at West Point, N.Y. and received an M.S. in management from M.I.T. McNulty also received an M.S. in nuclear physics. McNulty started working for the Parsons Corporation in 1988 after a career in the military and military administration, during which period he was, successively, a research associate at the Lawrence Livermore National Laboratory, assistant director of the Office of Military Applications at the U. S. Department of Energy, officer for nuclear weapons requirements at the Operations and Plans Office of the U.S. Department of Army, systems manager for the Pershing II Missile System and, finally, program manager for ground-based laser systems.

In 1998, McNulty became chairman of the Board of Directors of Parsons Corporation. McNulty had earlier in 1996 been named chief executive officer of Parsons shortly after its previous chief executive officer Leonard J. Pieroni died with U.S. Commerce Secretary Ronald H. Brown and 33 others in an airplane crash. In 2008 McNulty, then just shy of 66 years of age, as part of a planned succession, resigned his positions as Parson Corporation's Chief Executive Officer and, then, later in the year, his position as chairman of the Board of Directors of Parsons Corporation.
