= John McNulty (artist) =

John McNulty was born in Dublin in 1949. He graduated from the National College of Art in Dublin and the Etching Center in Geneva. McNulty has had 15 exhibitions and appearances in 4 international fairs (Basel; Tokyo; New York, New York: and Brisbane). His works have appeared in 2 major motion pictures, Wall Street and Regarding Henry, and are in 19 collections, including the Sears collection in Chicago, the Smith Barney, IBM, Amex, Bank of Scotland and Metropolitan Life collections, and the Glaxo collection in London.
