= John J. McNulty Jr. =

American politician

John J. McNulty Jr. (1922–2009) commonly known as "Jack" or "Big Jack," was an American politician who held various local political offices in Albany County, New York from 1949 to 2002.

His son, Michael R. McNulty, was elected to several successive terms as a United States Congressman. Jack McNulty was a "co-congressman" for the two decades that his son served in the U.S. Congress, before his retirement from the U.S. House of Representatives in 2008. A fellow Democrat, Jack was a staunch opponent of the entrenched old guard Albany County Democratic political machine, which had unseated his father John J. McNulty Sr. as Sheriff of Albany County, New York in a political in-fight in 1937. Jack recaptured that sheriff's office in 1973.

McNulty was a respected elder statesman of northern New York State; the mention of his name at a 2000 Democratic convention at the Times Union Center caused the full arena crowd of 11,000 people to rise in a spontaneous standing ovation. "Jack McNulty's word was his bond," said Democratic New York State Senator Neil Breslin. "For being 87, Jack knew how to change with the time. Jack connected to people in their 20s," said Albany County Democratic Chairman Dan McCoy. Rensselaer County Democratic Chairman Thomas Wade called him "the man I often introduced at Democratic Party events as the greatest Democrat I know."
