= Francis J. McNulty =

American politician

Francis J. McNulty was a Delaware state legislator at the turn of the 19th century. McNulty was elected to the Delaware General Assembly from New Castle County, Delaware in 1898. He served in the Delaware House of Representatives in the 90th Delaware General Assembly session, as well as the Delaware State Senate in the 91st Delaware General Assembly and 92nd Delaware General Assembly sessions.
