= Montana Belle =

1952 film

- Directed by: Allan Dwan
- Screenplay by: Horace McCoy; Norman S. Hall
- Story by: M. Coates Webster; Howard Welsch
- Produced by: Howard Welsch
- Starring: Jane Russell
- Cinematography: Jack A. Marta
- Edited by: Arthur Roberts
- Music by: Nathan Scott
- Production company: Fidelity-Vogue Pictures
- Distributed by: RKO Radio Pictures
- Release dates: November 7, 1952 (New York); November 11, 1952
- Running time: 82 minutes
- Country: United States
- Language: English
- Box office: $1 million (U.S. rentals)

Montana Belle is a 1952 American Trucolor Western film directed by Allan Dwan and starring Jane Russell and George Brent.

== Plot ==
Oklahoma outlaw Belle Starr meets the Dalton gang when she is rescued from lynching by Bob Dalton, who falls in love with her, as do gang member Mac and wealthy saloon owner Tom Bradfield, who has enlisted in a bankers' scheme to trap the Daltons.

== Cast ==
- Jane Russell as Belle Starr
- George Brent as Tom Bradfield
- Scott Brady as Bob Dalton
- Forrest Tucker as Mac
- Andy Devine as Pete Bivins
- Jack Lambert as Ringo
- John Litel as Matt Towner
- Ray Teal as Emmett Dalton
- Rory Mallinson as Grat Dalton
- Roy Barcroft as Jim Clark
- Ned Davenport as Bank Clerk
- Dick Elliott as Jeptha Rideout
- Gene Roth as Marshall Ripple
- Stanley Andrews as Marshall Combs
- Hank Bell as Townsman (uncredited)
- Iron Eyes Cody as Cherokee (uncredited)

== Production ==
Shot between late October and late November 1948, the film was intended to be distributed by Republic Pictures. In April 1949, Howard Welsch, who had produced the film for his company, Fidelity Pictures, sold the negative to RKO Radio Pictures for $875,000, about $225,000 more than the film's budget.

== Release ==
The film premiered at the Palace Theatre in New York on November 7, 1952.

== Reception ==
In a contemporary review for The New York Times, critic Howard Thompson called the film "the most overstated Western of the year" and wrote: "The picture strikes no new sparks, even with Miss Russell masterminding a gang of smitten desperadoes ... In a half-hearted attempt to turn a sow's ear, producer Howard Welsch has sprayed a fuzzy, garish color process over the cast and scenery. Allan Dwan's direction is lackadaisical and familiar. And the script, by Horace McCoy and Norman S. Hall, rattles with so many hand-me-down clichés that even diehard horse opera fans are apt to pine for the unvarnished vehicles of William S. Hart. At any rate, Miss Russell shares his jawline but precious little else and R. K O. has displayed her accordingly."
