= Beyond the Law (1918 film) =

1918 silent film

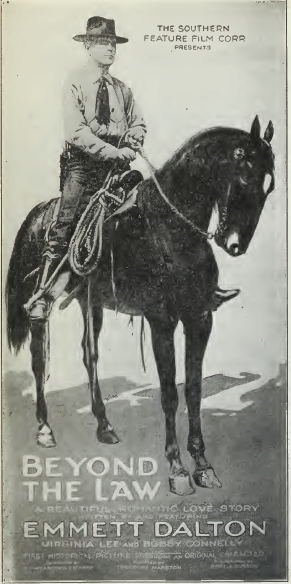
- Film poster
- Directed by: Theodore Marston
- Written by: Emmett Dalton (novel); William Addison Lathrop (scenario)
- Starring: Emmett Dalton, William R. Dunn, Virginia Lee
- Cinematography: Robert A. Olssen
- Production company: Southern Feature Film Corp.
- Distributed by: Southern Feature Film Corp.
- Release date: November 26, 1918
- Running time: 6 reels
- Country: United States
- Language: Silent (English intertitles)

Beyond the Law is a 1918 American silent Western film directed by Theodore Marston. It was based on a serial story of the same name, authored by Emmett Dalton, the lone surviving brother of the Dalton Gang, who appears in the film as himself and two of his deceased brothers.

== Background ==
Emmett Dalton wrote a serial story recounting "the exploits he and his brother outlaws perpetrated." Titled Beyond the Law, it was published in The Wide World Magazine, a London monthly, starting in May 1918. The same month, Dalton moved to Gastonia, North Carolina, as did the company he was the general manager of, the Southern Feature Film Corporation. The company published a half-page notice in the local paper, announcing their intention to make Beyond the Law into a movie, which it described as "a beautiful, historical, romantic story written around the lives of the Dalton Boys." A newspaper article in mid-July reported that production of the film was due to begin later that month requiring at least 30 people, and expected to last four or five weeks. An article the following week reported that Dalton was going to New York City to film interior scenes at the Famous Players Studio, with outdoor scenes to be filmed later in Bat Cave, North Carolina, and at Pawnee Bill Ranch in Oklahoma. References to the finished film, "a special six-reel feature", began to appear in early December.

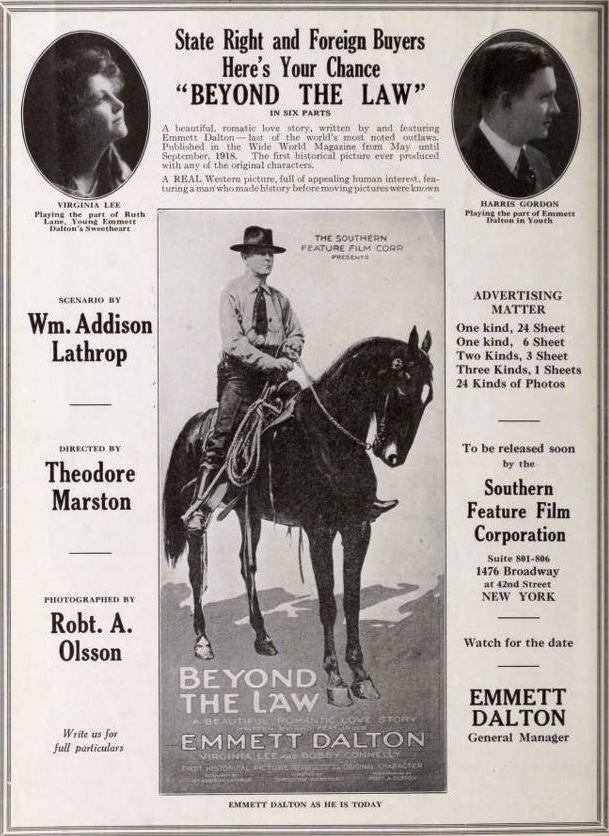

Showings of the film were reported by various newspapers starting in early 1919, including in Washington, D.C.; Newport News, Virginia; and Dalton's home city at the time, Gastonia. These reports also highlighted that Dalton personally attended screenings of the movie and would "lecture" at each performance.

== Cast ==
- Emmett Dalton as himself, Bob Dalton, and Frank Dalton
- Harris Gordon as the young Emmett Dalton
- Ida Pardee as Mother Dalton
- William R. Dunn as Grat Dalton
- Mabel Bardine as Eugenia Moore
- Jack O'Loughlin as William McElhanie
- Dick Clark as Charles Bryant
- Virginia Lee as Ruth Lane
- Bobby Connelly
