= Desperadoes (novel) =

1979 novel by Ron Hansen

- First edition
- Author: Ron Hansen
- Subject: Dalton Gang
- Genre: Western novel
- Publisher: Knopf
- Publication date: 1979
- Pages: 288
- ISBN: 9780060976989

Desperadoes is a 1979 fact and fiction novel by Ron Hansen that chronicles the rise and fall of the Dalton Gang.

The novel is told in the form of a fictional memoir written in 1937 by 65-year-old Emmett Dalton, the last surviving member of the gang. The novel's main characters are the Daltons — Bob Dalton (the leader of the gang), Emmett Dalton, Gratton "Grat" Dalton, William M."Bill" Dalton, and Eugenia Moore AKA Florence Quick, Bob's girl friend and the gang's strategist. The primary action of the novel takes place between the murder of Frank Dalton (the oldest brother) in November, 1887, up to and through the gang's destruction trying to simultaneously rob two banks in Coffeyville, Kansas on October 5, 1892.

In 2013, it was in development for a television miniseries of six hours written by Robert Knott, produced by Josh Maurer and Alixandre Witlin, and developed by FX. According to Robert E. Morsberger, it is "the best fiction I have read about western outlaws".
