= When the Daltons Rode =

1940 film

- Theatrical release poster
- Directed by: George Marshall
- Screenplay by: Harold Shumate
- Based on: When the Daltons Rode by Emmett Dalton and Jack Jungmeyer
- Starring: Randolph Scott; Kay Francis; Brian Donlevy
- Cinematography: Hal Mohr
- Edited by: Edward Curtiss
- Music by: Frank Skinner
- Production company: Universal Pictures
- Distributed by: Universal Pictures
- Release dates: July 25, 1940 (Coffeyville, Kansas); August 23, 1940 (United States)
- Running time: 81 minutes
- Country: United States
- Language: English

When the Daltons Rode is a 1940 American Western film directed by George Marshall and starring Randolph Scott, Kay Francis and Brian Donlevy. Based on the 1931 book of the same name by Emmett Dalton, a member of the Dalton Gang, and Jack Jungmeyer Sr., the film also includes a fictional family friend who tries to dissuade the Dalton brothers from becoming outlaws.

== Plot ==
The film opens with the Old-Timer talking to Tod Jackson, setting the background of the story. Tod doesn't want a history lesson, he just wants to know where the Daltons live.

The Dalton brothers, law-abiding farmers, move to Kansas from Missouri to begin a new life. Bob Dalton persuades Tod, a childhood friend and now a lawyer, to defend his kin Ben Dalton in a court case against a corrupt land-development company.

A melee erupts during the trial and the Daltons shoot their way out of the courtroom. Cronies of the land developers and the press portray the brothers as vicious criminals. Ben is shot in the back. Unable to live lawfully, the Daltons rob a stagecoach, and their reputation as dangerous outlaws spreads.

Tod and Bob Dalton's fiancée, Julie, fall in love.

Tod discovers that Caleb Winters is secretly behind the land company, amassing farmland he can sell for the railroad right-of-way, but when he tells Bob about it, Bob knocks him out. His mother and Julie confront Bob, and he realizes that he is no longer the man he was.

The gang was supposed to go their separate ways, but they defy Bob to pull one more bank job. He joins them in the resulting shootout. Winters takes rifle shots at the gang from his 2nd floor office, killing Ozark among others. When silence falls, Tod steps out onto the sidewalk and Winters aims at him. With his dying breath, Bob reloads his rifle and kills Winters.

Dissolve to a storefront displaying souvenir photos of the Dalton's and “Death Alley”.

Cut to the Old Timer, talking to Tod and Julie, who are now married.

== Cast ==
- Randolph Scott as Tod Jackson
- Kay Francis as Julie King
- Brian Donlevy as Grat Dalton
- George Bancroft as Caleb Winters
- Broderick Crawford as Bob Dalton
- Stuart Erwin as Ben Dalton
- Andy Devine as Ozark Jones
- Frank Albertson as Emmett Dalton
- Mary Gordon as Ma Dalton
- Harvey Stephens as Rigby
- Edgar Dearing as Sheriff
- Quen Ramsey as Clem Wilson
- Dorothy Granger as Nancy
- Robert McKenzie as Photographer
- Fay McKenzie as Hannah
- Walter Soderling as Judge Lucius Thorndown (Judge Swain in the credits)
- Mary Ainslee as Minnie
- Erville Alderson as Dist. Atty. Wade
- Sally Payne as Annabella
- Edgar Buchanan as Old Timer (uncredited)
- June Wilkins as Suzy

== Production ==
The film was based on Emmett Dalton's autobiography. Universal announced the project in March 1940 with filming to begin in May. Stuart Anthony and Lester Cole worked on the script. The railroad scenes were filmed on the Sierra Railroad in Tuolumne County, California.
