= Mabel Bardine =

American actress

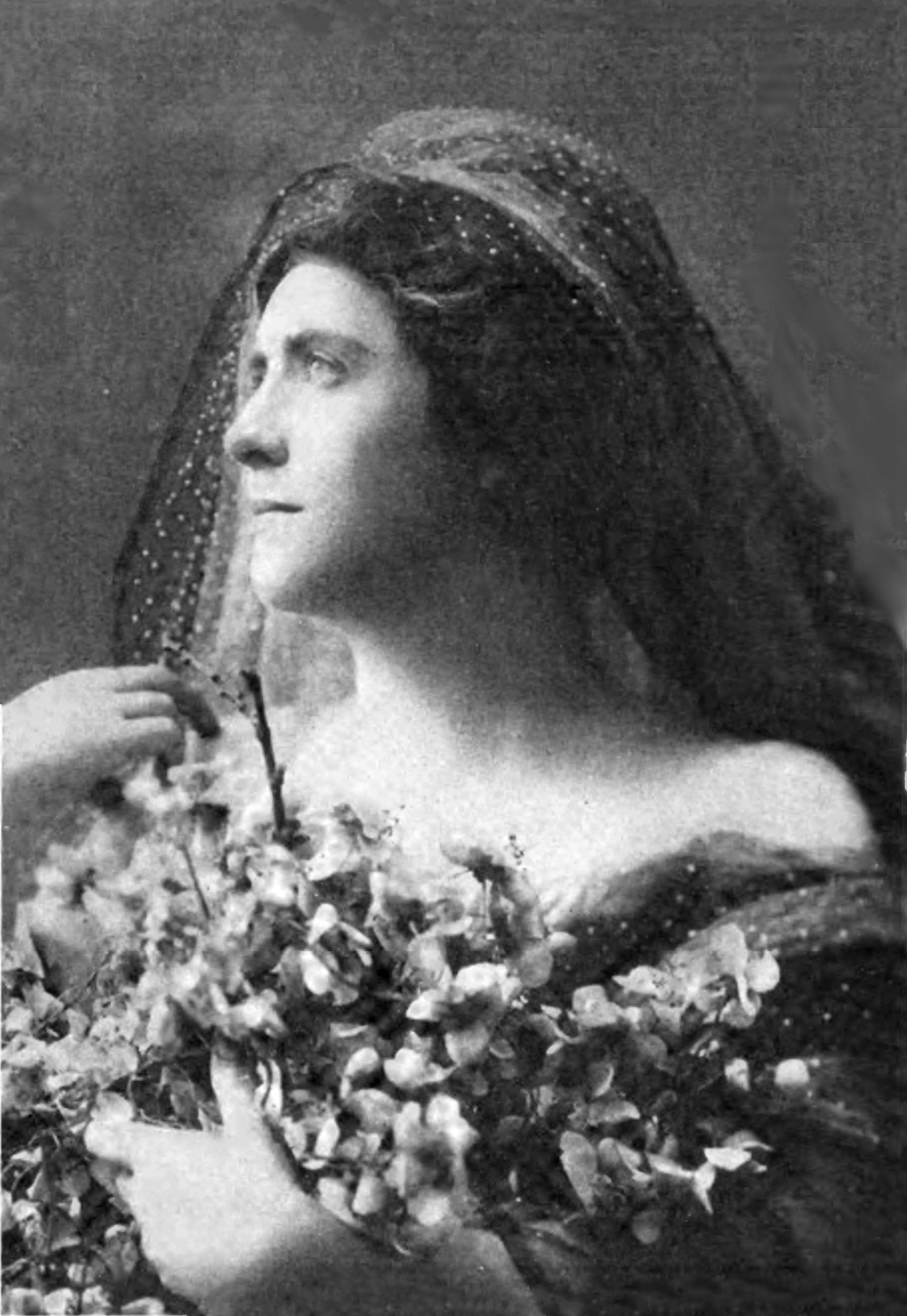
- Bardine in 1909
- Born: Mabel Bardine Myers; October 25, 1878; Colorado, U.S.
- Died: October 20, 1948 (aged 69); Los Angeles, California, U.S.
- Other name: Mabel Bardine Myers Farnsworth
- Occupations: Vaudeville performer, actress

Mabel Bardine Myers Farnsworth (October 25, 1878 - October 20, 1948), was an American vaudeville performer and Hollywood actress. In 1908 she was accused of plagiarizing the sketch, The Chorus Lady, from Rose Stahl. She was a leading woman in Essanay Studios and Fox Film.

== Biography ==
She was born as Mabel Bardine Myers on October 25, 1878, in Colorado.

In 1908 she was accused of plagiarizing the sketch, The Chorus Lady, from Rose Stahl.

She died on October 20, 1948, in Los Angeles, California. She was buried in Forest Lawn Memorial Park in Glendale, California.

== Filmography ==
- The Splendid Lie (1920)
- The Place of Honeymoons (1920)
- Winning Her Way (1919) by Margaret Mayo for the American Red Cross
- Rough and Ready (1918)
- Beyond the Law (1918)
- Mother Love and the Law (1917)

== Vaudeville playlets ==
- An Experiment in Humor (1910)
- Nell of the Halls (1909)
- Thou Shall Not Kill (1905), produced by Federick Schwartz
