= Rough and Ready (1918 film) =

1918 film

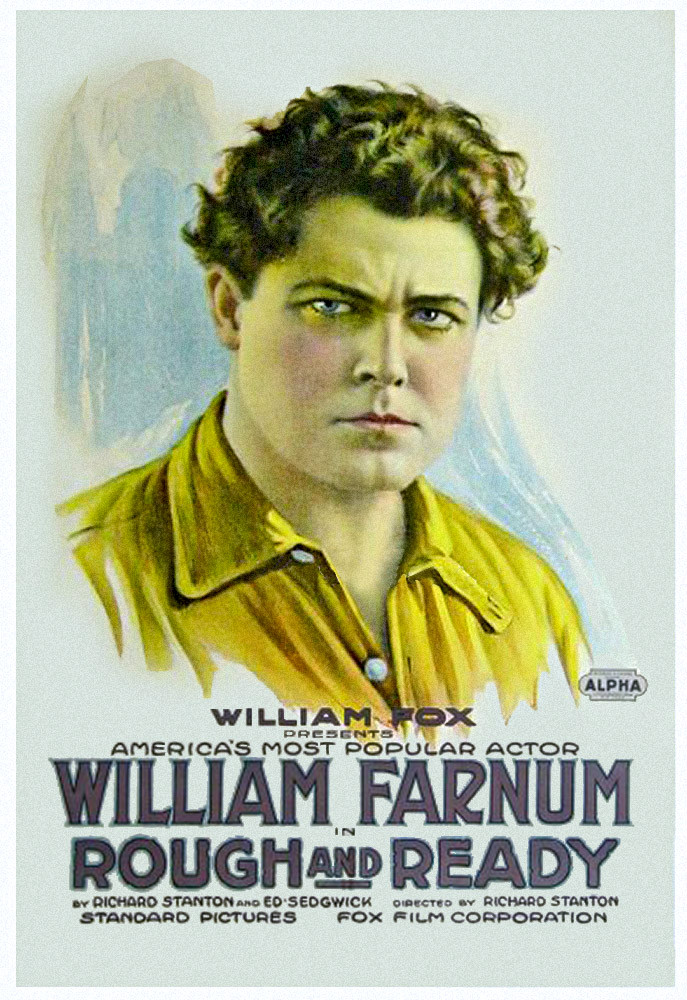
- Film poster
- Directed by: Richard Stanton
- Written by: Edward Sedgwick; Richard Stanton
- Produced by: William Fox
- Starring: William Farnum
- Distributed by: Fox Film Corporation
- Release date: March 24, 1918
- Running time: 60 minutes (6 reels)
- Country: United States
- Languages: Silent; English intertitles

Rough and Ready is a 1918 American silent Western film directed by Richard Stanton and produced and distributed by the Fox Film Corporation. It stars stage actor and western hero William Farnum. The picture was filmed in the Adirondack Mountains in western New York state. It is a lost film.

== Plot ==
As described in a film magazine, Evelyn Durant finds her lover in what she believes is a compromising situation and breaks their engagement. Bill Stratton leaves for the Yukon. He becomes a close friend of a tired, little old miner who turns out to be Matthew Durant, Evelyn's father. Evelyn comes to visit her father and, though Bill tries to get her to her father, she resents his efforts and takes the offer of assistance of Jack Belmont. She learns the true character of Belmont when he attempts to force his attentions on her. After a terrific battle with Belmont and many hardships, Bill finally succeeds in bringing daughter and father together and in winning her forgiveness.

== Cast ==
- William Farnum as Bill Stratton
- Violet Palmer as Evelyn Durant
- Alphonse Ethier as Jack Belmont
- Jessie Arnold as Estelle Darrow
- David Higgins as Matthew Durant
- Frank Newton as Ed Brown
- Mabel Bardine as Bess Brown
- Frank McGlynn, Sr. as The Siwash

== Reception ==
Like many American films of the time, Rough and Ready was subject to cuts by city and state film censorship boards. For example, the Chicago Board of Censors cut, in Reel 2, two intertitles "That's the toughest proposition — booze, gambling and females" and "Cheechaka, a blot even among its neighbors, where men fight for possession of those creatures who were once women", eight tough dance hall scenes (to include women at bar), five gambling scenes including one closeup, closeup of woman with breast exposed, Reel 3, three views of gambler threatening man with gun, two scenes of young women at bar, second choking scene, slugging scene, Reel 5, three intertitles "you beast", "We'll cut the cards to see who gets her", and "How dare you breath that name", cutting the cards for the young woman, Reel 6, two intertitles "I was a fool to play square with Stratton" and "Silver Jack has her in my room", giving key to man, man locking door, five struggle scenes and chase of young woman, six fight scenes of men on floor where they tear at mouths and hair, giving man dagger in fight, biting man's arm, seven other fight scenes, two scenes of dead man leaning on Stratton, all but one scene of Stratton looking at dead man with dagger in chest, closeup of young woman with low-cut gown, two scenes of women in balcony looking at fight, four near scenes of Stratton with woman in background wearing low-cut gown, and six closeups of fight between men showing undue brutality.
