= Emmett Dalton =

American outlaw (1871–1937)

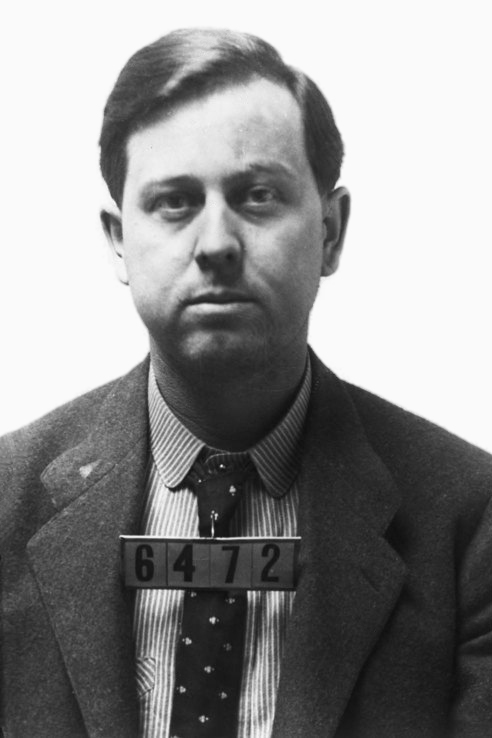
- Booking photo between 1892 and 1893
- Born: May 3, 1871; Belton, Missouri, U.S.
- Died: July 13, 1937 (aged 66); Los Angeles, California, U.S.
- Resting place: Kingfisher, Oklahoma, U.S.
- Occupations: Outlaw; Real estate agent; author; actor
- Status: Pardoned after 14 years served
- Allegiance: Dalton Gang
- Conviction: Second-degree murder
- Penalty: Life imprisonment

Emmett Dalton (May 3, 1871 – July 13, 1937) was an American outlaw, train robber and member of the Dalton Gang in the American Old West. Part of a gang that attempted to rob two banks in Coffeyville, Kansas, on October 5, 1892, he was the only member of five to survive, despite receiving 23 gunshot wounds. Two of his brothers were killed. After serving 14 years in prison for the crime, Dalton was pardoned. He later capitalized on his notoriety, both as a writer and as an actor. His 1918 serial story Beyond the Law was adapted as a like-named silent film in which he played himself. His 1931 book When the Daltons Rode was adapted after his death as a 1940 film of the same name.

== Biography ==
=== Early life ===
Dalton was born in 1871 in Missouri to Lewis (1826–1890) and Adeline (née Younger) Dalton (1835–1925). Adeline Younger was a half-sibling of Henry Washington Younger, father of four brothers with the James–Younger Gang.

Emmett was the eighth born of nine brothers; they had three sisters. His siblings were:

- Charles Benjamin "Ben" Dalton (1852–1936)
- Henry Coleman Dalton (1853–1920)
- Littleton "Lit" Lee Dalton (1857–1942)
- Franklin "Frank" Dalton (1859–1887)
- Gratton Hanley "Grat" Dalton (1861–1892)
- William Marion "Bill" Dalton (1863–1894)
- Eva May Dalton (1867–1939)
- Robert Rennick "Bob" Dalton (1869–1892)
- Leona Randolph Dalton (1875–1964)
- Nancy May Dalton (1876–1901)
- Simon Noel "Si" Dalton (1878–1928)

=== Outlaw years ===
Emmett's older brothers Bob and Grat briefly worked as US deputy marshals in Indian Territory, sharing a position held by their older brother Frank Dalton after he was killed in the line of duty. They hired Emmett to serve as a guard at the jail at Fort Smith, in present-day Arkansas. The elder two started working for the Osage Nation to help them set up a police force, but fled after being pursued for stealing horses.

They began to conduct robberies of banks, stagecoaches, and trains. Emmett joined them, along with two other men. Their venture ended on October 5, 1892, when they attempted to rob two banks the same day in Coffeyville, Kansas. They had hoped to make enough money to flee the country. Four of the gang were killed in a gun fight with law enforcement and townsmen. Emmett Dalton was severely wounded, receiving 23 gunshot wounds, but survived. He later asserted that he never fired a shot during the Coffeyville bank robbery.

=== Prison ===
In March 1893, Dalton pleaded guilty to second-degree murder and was sentenced to life in the penitentiary in Lansing, Kansas. In June 1907, he was paroled in order to receive treatment to his right arm, which had been injured in Coffeyville. He returned to prison after treatment, then was pardoned in November 1907 by Edward W. Hoch, the Governor of Kansas.

=== After prison ===
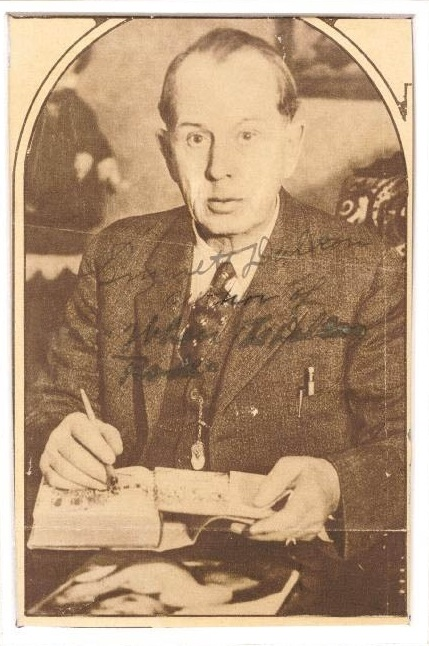
Dalton in 1931

Dalton moved to Southern California after leaving prison, and married Julia Johnson the following year, 1908. Later, he sold real estate, as Southern California was developing rapidly with migrants from across the country.

Dalton's account of his exploits with his brothers, titled Beyond the Law, was published in 1918 as serial story in The Wide World Magazine, a London monthly. The serial was made into a like-named movie in which Dalton portrayed himself. In 1931, he published When the Daltons Rode., co-written with Jack Jungmeyer Sr., a Los Angeles journalist. It was adapted as a 1940 movie of the same name, starring Randolph Scott, Kay Francis and Brian Donlevy—Emmett Dalton was portrayed by Frank Albertson. He also appeared in The Man on the Desert.

Dalton died in July 1937 at the age of 66 and is buried in Kingfisher, Oklahoma. His widow Julia Johnson Dalton died in 1943, aged 73. She was cremated and buried in Dewey, Oklahoma.

== Bibliography ==
- Dalton, Emmett (1918). Beyond the Law. OCLC 779023614.
- Dalton, Emmett; Jungmeyer, Jack. When the Daltons Rode. Garden City, New York: Doubleday, Doran & Company, Inc. OCLC 558748021.
- Dalton, Emmett; Jungmeyer, Jack. West of 96. Butterick Publishing Company. OCLC 11723701.
- Dalton, Emmett. Prison delivery. Grafton, Massachusetts: R.F. Cummings. OCLC 461740841.

== See also ==
- Dalton Gang Hideout and Museum, listed on the U.S. National Register of Historic Places
