= Dalton Gang =

Group of outlaws in the American Old West

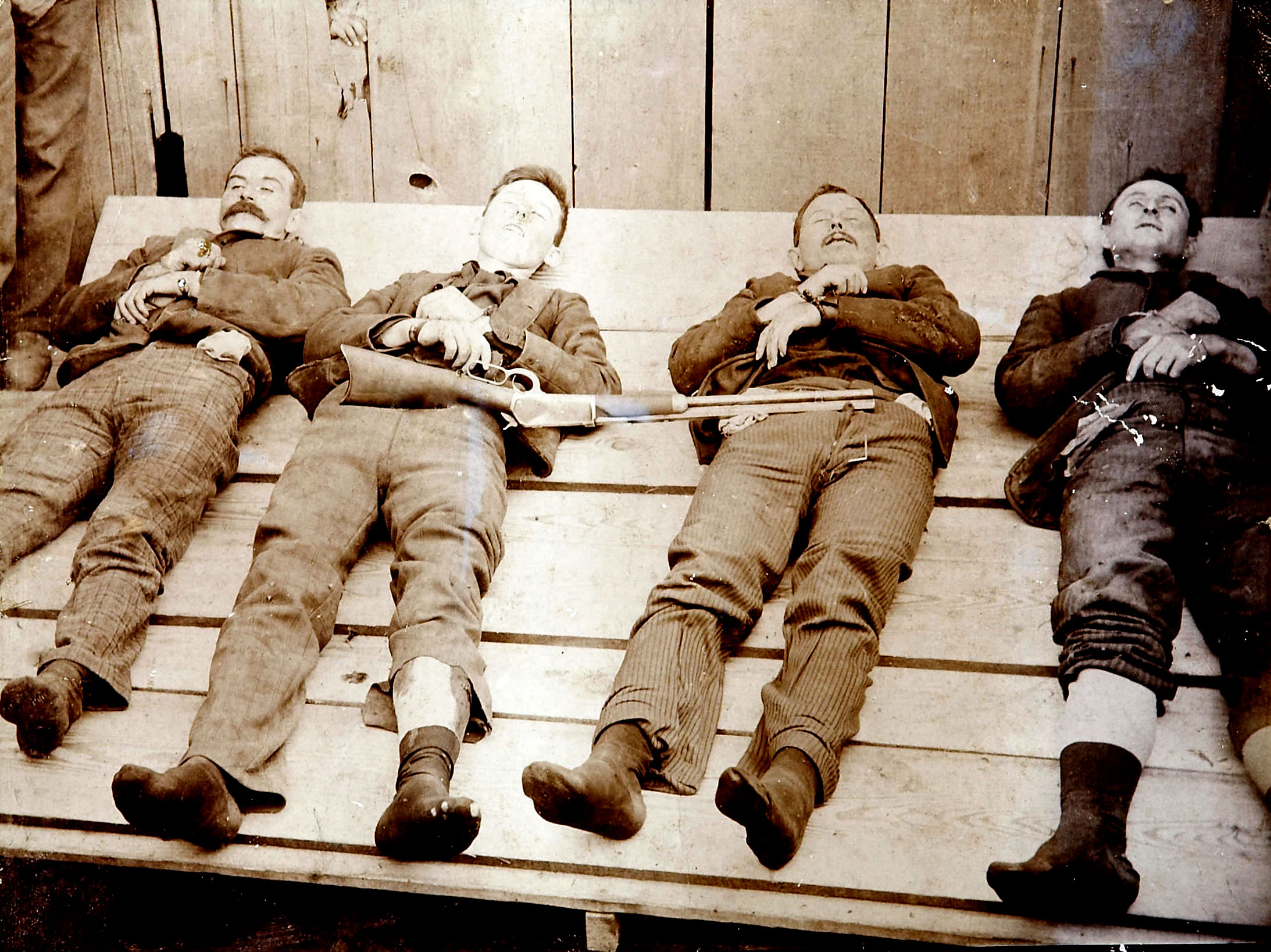
- Dalton gang following the 1892 Coffeyville, Kansas raid. Left to right: Bill Powers; Bob Dalton; Grat Dalton, Dick Broadwell
- Founded: March 21, 1890
- Founding location: Pawhuska, Indian Territory
- Years active: March 21, 1890 – October 5, 1892
- Membership: 9
- Activities: Bank and train robberies

The Dalton Gang was a group of outlaws in the American Old West during 1890–1892. It was also known as The Dalton Brothers because three of its members were brothers. The gang specialized in bank and train robberies. During an attempted double bank robbery in Coffeyville, Kansas, in 1892, two of the brothers and two other gang members were killed; Emmett Dalton survived, was captured, and later pleaded guilty to second-degree murder, although he later asserted that he never fired a shot during the robbery. He was paroled after serving 14 years in prison.

Brothers Bob, "Grat", and Emmett had first worked as lawmen for the federal court at Fort Smith, Arkansas and then for the Osage Nation. They started stealing horses to make more money, and then fled the area. They decided to form a gang and started robbing trains and banks. While their older brother "Bill" Dalton never joined any heists, he served as their spy and informant.

Due to the sensationalism that surrounded the Dalton Gang's exploits, they were accused of robberies all over the country but operated chiefly in California, Kansas, Oklahoma Territory, and Indian Territory. Numerous myths were published about the gang. After Bob and Grat were killed at Coffeyville, Bill Dalton formed another gang with Bill Doolin, known as the Wild Bunch or the Dalton-Doolin Gang.

== Beginnings ==
James Lewis Dalton from Jackson County, Missouri, and Kentucky was the father of all four boys. He was a saloon keeper in Kansas City, Missouri, when he married Adeline Lee Younger. Through her half-brother, Adeline was an aunt of Cole and Jim Younger, of the James–Younger Gang. The Daltons may have been inspired by their famous cousins' exploits— the Youngers were much older and imprisoned at the time of the Dalton Gang's activities.

The Dalton children were:

- Charles Benjamin "Ben" Dalton (1852–1936)
- Henry Coleman "Cole" Dalton (1853–1920)
- Littleton "Lit" Lee Dalton (1857–1942)
- Franklin "Frank" Dalton (1859–1887)
- Gratton Hanley "Grat" Dalton (1861–1892)
- William Marion "Bill" Dalton (1863–1894)
- Eva May Dalton (1867–1939)
- Robert Rennick "Bob" Dalton (1869–1892)
- Emmett Dalton (1871–1937)
- Leona Randolph Dalton (1875–1964)
- Nancy May Dalton (1876–1901)
- Simon Noel "Si" Dalton (1878–1928)

The brothers who were members of the Dalton Gang were Bob, Grat, Emmett, and Bill.

== Lawmen ==
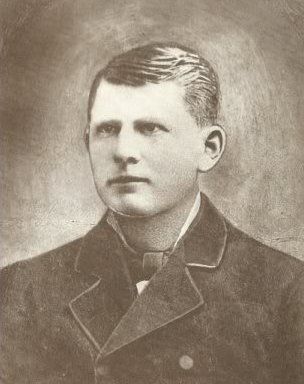
Frank Dalton

On November 27, 1887, Frank Dalton and another deputy marshal, Jim Cole, went across the river from Fort Smith to arrest three whiskey bootleggers. As they approached the camp the bootleggers began to fire on them. Frank shot and killed two, but his gun jammed and he was killed by the remaining bootlegger. His deputy abandoned him after being wounded. Frank is buried in Coffeyville, Kansas.

After Frank's death, Grat moved back from California and took over his brother's job as deputy marshal at Fort Smith. He also brought Bob along as a posse member. In August 1888, the two formed a posse to arrest a man named Charley Montgomery. Montgomery was alleged to be posing as a deputy marshal. Bob discovered his location in Timber Hills while Grat was away searching in Coffeyville and went ahead to lead the posse in making the arrest himself before Montgomery could escape the territory. The stakeout ended in Montgomery’s death.

In January 1889, Grat and Bob both became deputies first under Marshal Jones and later under Marshal R.L. Walker in Wichita. Looking to earn more money, Bob also became part of the Osage Nation police force in addition to his job as a deputy. Unlike the marshals office, the Osage Police paid a monthly salary. Bob also hired Emmett under him to guard prisoners.

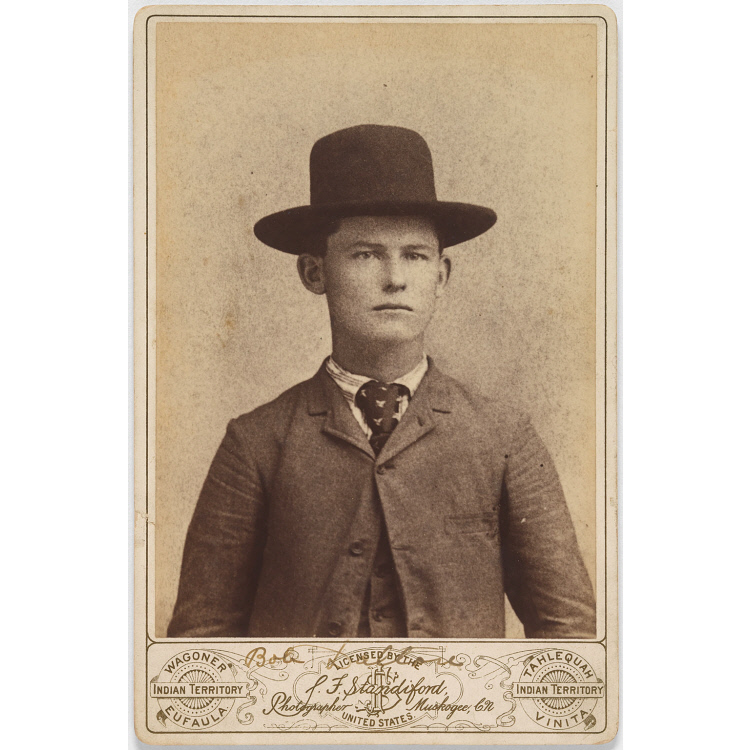
Photo of Robert "Bob" Dalton c. 1889

== Outlaws ==
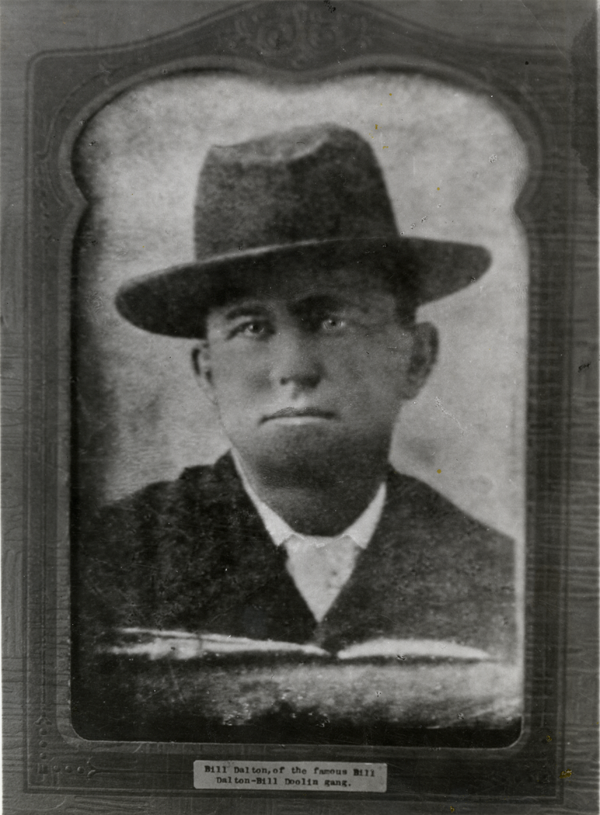
Bill Dalton

=== Alila Robbery ===
On the night of February 6, 1891, two masked men carrying 44-calibre revolvers held up a Southern Pacific Railroad passenger train near the town of Alila (present day Earlimart, California). The outlaws had worn masks during the Alila robbery, concealing their identities. Some years later, Lit Dalton asserted that Bob and Emmett had told him many times that they had robbed the train.

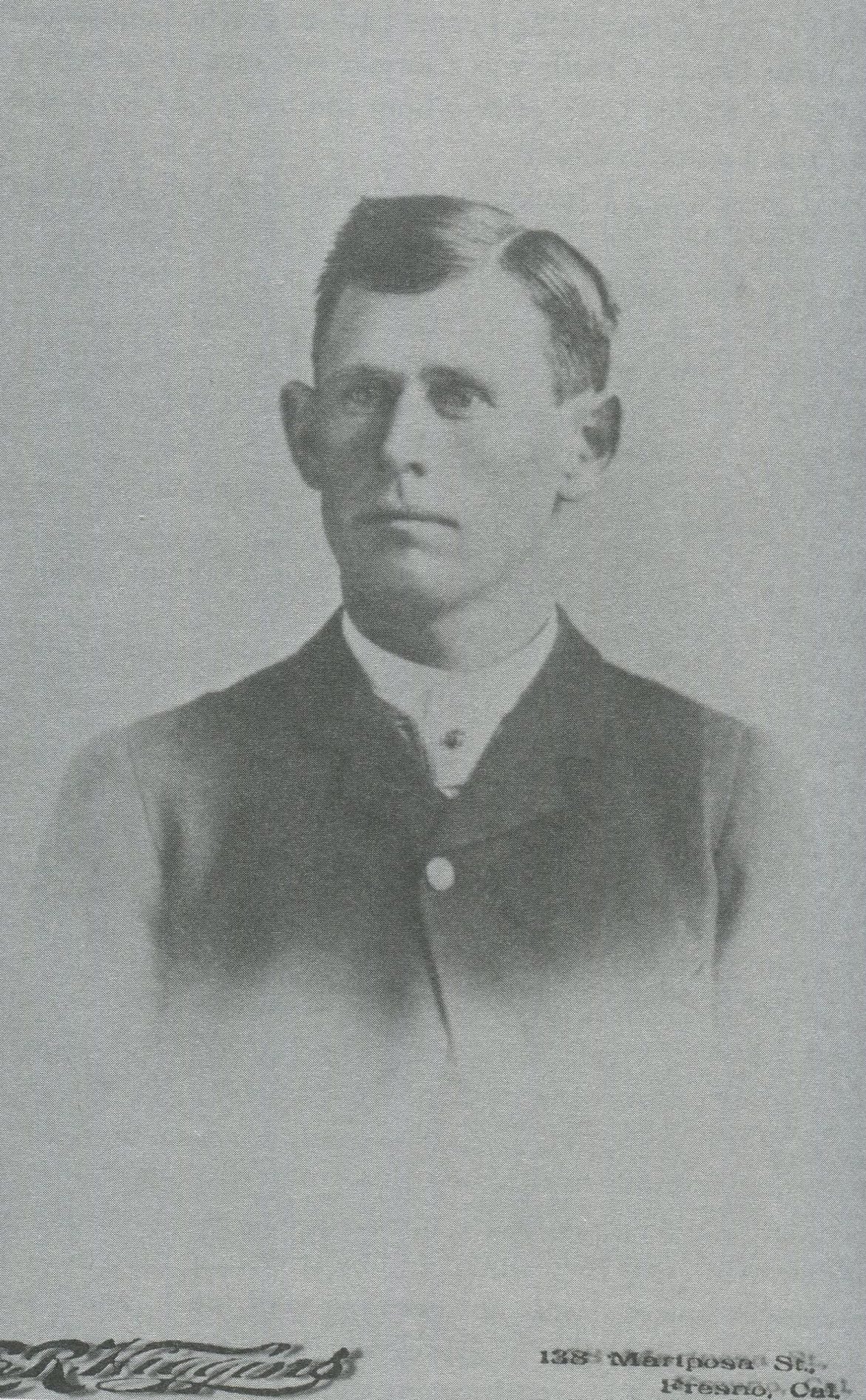
Littleton "Lit" Dalton taken about 1888

Bob and Emmett were hiding out in a ranch barn a mile west of Malaga, and after arriving the brothers talked until morning. Lit noticed that Grat's horse was indeed limp and agreed to help Grat sell it. Since the horse was lame, they could only get $60 for it and Grat was unable to find another horse afterwards. Grat shipped his saddle and riding rig to Delano and took the train to Traver where he met Bob and Emmett. They played poker all night in Traver and then traveled to Tulare to do the same. They had been following the Southern Pacific pay car as it made its way down the valley from Oakland to Bakersfield to pay railroad employees. This train was always accompanied by a crowd of gamblers and prostitutes, and Grat and Bob had "followed the pay car" together several times before.

=== Pursuit across the Southwest ===
In the two weeks following the robbery, Bob and Emmett hid out in the mountains near Bill's ranch. Bill left his brothers supplies and food and obtained horses to evade pursuit.

Despite these efforts, Bill was arrested in Paso Robles by Sheriff Kay and taken to Visalia. After a hearing, Bill was held for trial for the Alila robbery, but he secured bondsmen and was released.

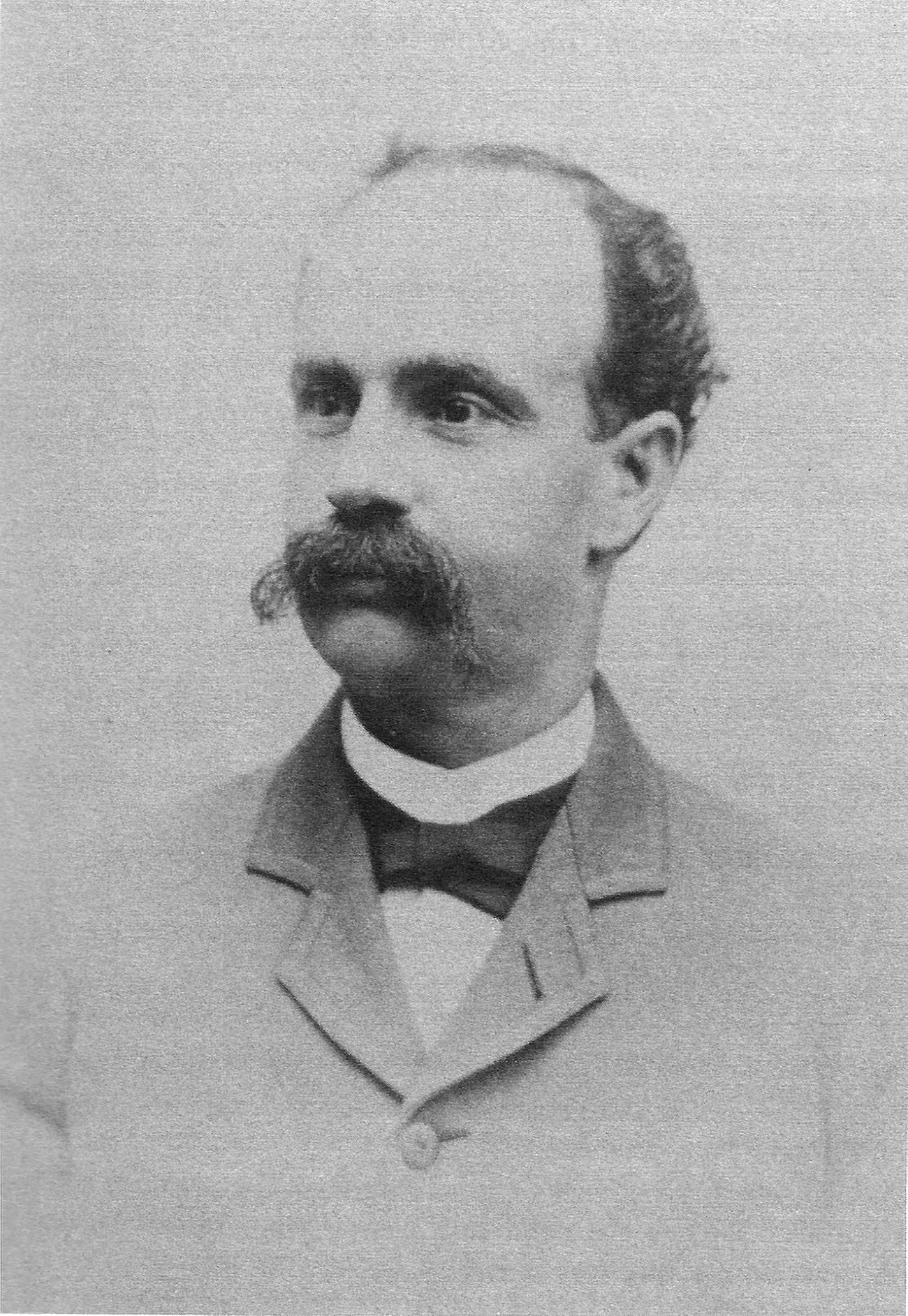
Tulare County Sheriff Gene Kay, taken in 1891 when he was sworn into office

Sheriff Kay decided to pursue Bob and Emmett with his deputy, Jim Ford.

Kay tracked the Daltons to their mother's home, and kept watch of the house for a few days before being forced to return to Kingfisher because of bad weather. When he returned the next day to watch the house, he discovered that Bob and Emmett had escaped. Kay talked to their mother for several hours and she even invited him in for breakfast. She denied any wrongdoing by her sons, stating that they were in fact lawmen, and told Kay they had gone to Guthrie if he wanted to talk with them.

Kay and Ford traveled the fifty miles to Guthrie, but soon came into problems when dealing with different tribal jurisdictions. At Guthrie, Kay and Ford noticed that there had been some sort of celebration the night before as they were greeted by three white men hanging from a large tree at the entrance to town and noticed the streets were lined with several groups of black men playing Craps on the sidewalks. Kay found out that, before they had arrived, Bob and Emmett had got into a fight at one of the saloons there and badly beat up two cowboys before leaving for Topeka.

Sheriff Kay was forced to give up the chase in order to return to California for Grat's trial. The Daltons had plenty of friends in the area willing to hide them and easily lost Kay once they were in familiar territory. After they realized they were no longer being pursued, Bob and Emmett began to form what would be known as the Dalton Gang.

=== Grat's trial ===
For the four months that Bob and Emmett spent trying to lose Sheriff Kay in the desert, Grat sat in the Tulare County jail in Visalia awaiting his trial. After securing bondsmen, Bill immediately went to Merced and hired John W. Beckenridge, the best attorney in the San Joaquin Valley, to defend Grat. What Bill did not know is that Beckenridge was also a consulting attorney for the Southern Pacific railroad. To help pay him the two thousand dollars he asked for, Bill sold almost all of his horses and mules. Their mother also came to California from Kingfisher to pay Beckenridge after she mortgaged her home and borrowed money from neighbors. She then traveled to Visalia with her two daughters, as well as her sons Ben, Cole, Lit and Bill, for Grat's trial.

Grat's trial did not start until that June and it lasted three weeks. Though much of the evidence showed that Grat was in Fresno the night of the Alila robbery, including the testimony of several witnesses, the influence of the powerful Southern Pacific Railroad caused him to receive an unfair trial. Beckenridge showed up to the trial late and drunk, and neither the defense, nor the prosecution mentioned that the fireman had been accidentally killed by the expressman. This was unknown to Grat, since the Dalton brothers had all assumed that Emmett had killed the fireman. Almost all of Beckenridge's witnesses were bar keepers, gamblers, saloon hangers-on, or pimps. Sheriff Kay even pointed out during the trial that Beckenridge had overlooked Grat's rights. Southern Pacific detective Will Smith visited Grat's cell almost every day during the trial trying to get a confession out of him and Grat began to despise Smith.

Kay knew that, besides Beckenridge's sabotage of the case, Grat would probably be found innocent and their case against Bob and Emmett would fall through. Towards the end of the trial, Sheriff Kay, Detective Smith, and District Attorney Power talked to Grat while taking him back to his cell from the court room when Beckenridge was not present. Kay told Grat that he knew neither Bob or Emmett killed the fireman. He offered to admit this in court if Grat and Bill told the true story of the robbery. Detective Smith decided to chime in, but Grat said he would not say a word while Smith was present. Smith was told to leave and both Bill and Grat agreed to tell their story, but only if they showed that there was no first degree murder in the robbery. The Daltons told their stories, but neither Kay or Beckenridge ever cleared up the murder point and ruined Grat's case.

=== Ceres robbery ===
Grat was taken back to jail to await his sentence. While in jail, a train robbery occurred near Ceres, on September 3, 1891, but was unsuccessful with no money being taken. The only evidence found at the robbery was a coat made from a tailor from Visalia. Kay suspected that this was probably the work of some suspects he had from Visalia, but the railroad detectives demanded the arrest of the remaining Dalton brothers. Kay telegraphed his deputy George Witty and told him to check on Bill Dalton and to immediately notify him when he was found. Kay checked on his Visalia suspects, who at the time were running a livery stable in Modesto, and was convinced they were not involved with the Ceres robbery. He then went to Fresno to check on Lit and Cole Dalton, and was convinced of the same.

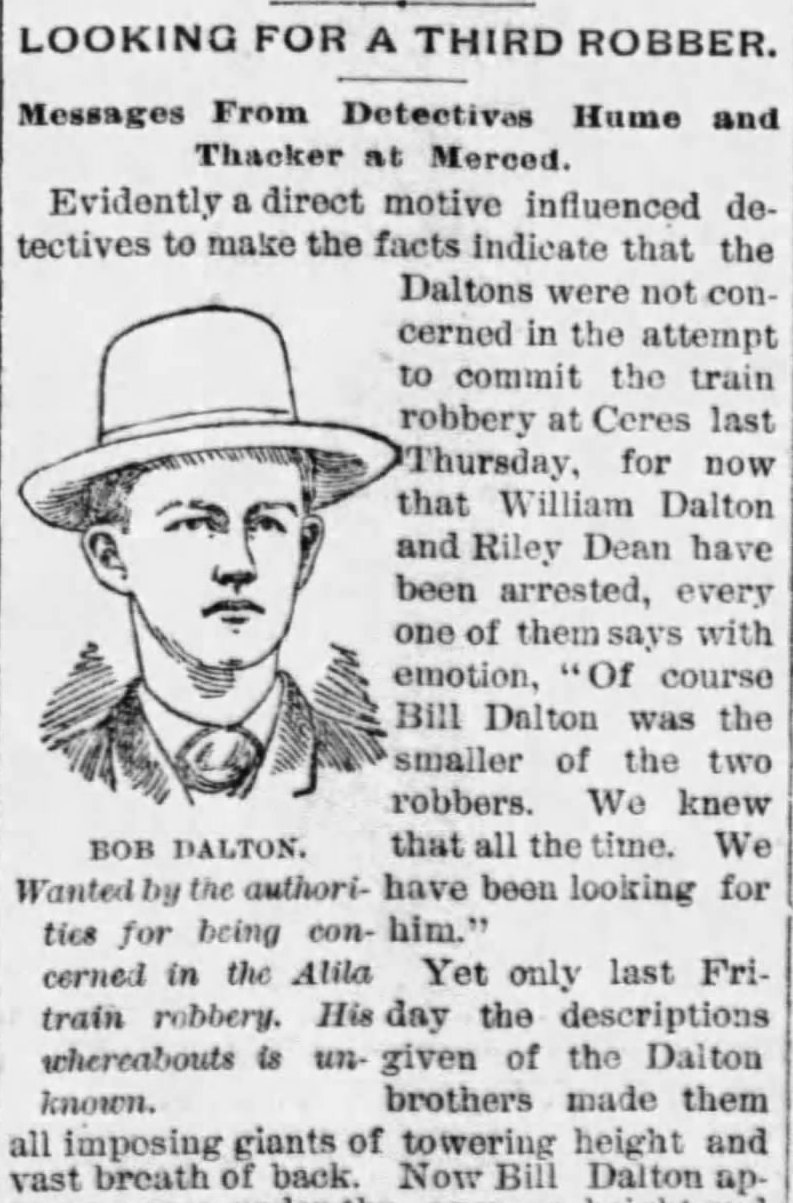
San Francisco Examiner, September 8, 1891

When Kay returned to Visalia, he immediately went with detective Smith to the tailor of the coat found at the Ceres robbery. The tailor remembered the coat, but he could not remember who had bought it, only that some girl had picked it up once it was clean. After Kay finished talking to the cleaner, Deputy George Witty reported to him that telegrams from the coast said Bill was not in Paso Robles or Estrella. Neither was he in Merced or Livingston. Witty did have a clue from another deputy that two strange men had been seen hanging around after dark on the open plain near Traver and at the abandoned Overland Stage station at Cross Creek. Kay suspected that Bob and Emmett might be back in California to free Grat from jail, and took Deputy Witty with him to the Cross Creek station in his buggy.

Late in the afternoon, Kay and Witty were about four hundred yards from the station when they saw two men crouching as they crossed the road from the old stage barn to the station. Kay's buggy was directly facing the setting sun, so they could not tell who the men were. The road curved behind some willow trees, and Kay told Witty to drive past the house, passing close to the door, and then to drive back. With his revolver in hand, Kay dropped to the ground as they passed the door and slowly entered the station. Maggie Rucker, the woman who once ran the Cross Creek Overland station, was sitting with another girl alone in the front room, silently making dresses. Kay asked Rucker if there was anyone else around and she replied that there was not. Right as she said this, Kay heard someone rush across the floor of an adjoining room and through the crack in the door he could see a man taking position at the window.

Kay moved quietly across the floor and pushed the door a little farther open with his revolver. Standing with his back towards him was Bill Dalton, watching the horses and buggy Kay had just left, while nervously working the lever of his winchester. Kay nudged the door open with his elbow, aimed his revolver at Bill and said, "Bill! Hello!". Bill, thrown off his guard, quickly turned around and mimicked the greeting, "Kay! Hello!". He then threw the butt of his winchester to the ground and the two nervously laughed at each other. Kay had Bill put his rifle down, backed him into the front room, and checked him for any other weapons. When they came back into the front room both Maggie Rucker and the girl remained quiet as they both expected Kay to have been killed.

Deputy Witty entered shortly after, and was told by Kay to go in the room and grab Bill's rifle. As Witty entered the room, he heard a noise come from somewhere inside. Thinking it might be Bob, Kay demanded that Bill tell him where he was. Bill told Kay that Bob was not in the country, that he had stopped at Rucker's place alone to spend the night. Kay knew this was untrue as he had seen two men cross the road. He soon discovered a worn place in the carpet and found a trap door hidden underneath. He had Bill lift the carpet and open the trap door and, instead of Bob, they discovered a man named Riley Dean, a saloon hanger-on from Visalia and Traver. It became apparent to Kay that Bill had been busy hiding Dean when he arrived, otherwise they would have heard him come in. Kay decided to place both men under arrest and took them to Visalia.

After Bill and Riley Dean were brought to the Visalia jail, Sheriff Pervis of Stanislaus County, S.P. detective Will Smith, and Wells Fargo detectives Hume and Thacker arrived to bring the two men to Modesto to stand trial for the Ceres robbery. When Bill and Dean were acquitted, Bill was rearrested by Kay after his bondsmen were convinced to withdraw by detective Hume. He was then taken back to Visalia to await his trial for the Alila robbery.

Bill was interviewed by the Fresno Expositor in September 1891 saying, "The truth is I am like Paddy Miles' boy --- no matter what goes wrong or what depredation is committed, Bill Dalton is always charged with the same."

=== Formation of the gang ===
Bob and Emmett, meanwhile, had been busy in Oklahoma forming their gang. After their unsuccessful career in California, they decided they could do much better in their home country, and unlike their first attempts, they began carefully planning their robberies. As a former lawman, Bob knew the difficulty officers had enforcing laws in Indian and Oklahoma Territories. While the Indian Nations had their own tribal law enforcement, these agencies had no jurisdiction over non-Indians. The newly formed Oklahoma Territory had organized their own sheriff and city police departments, but there was so far very little cooperation between them. The only agency with jurisdiction over the whole territory was the U.S. Marshals Service, but it was quickly becoming fragmented due to power struggles between newly formed district courts and jealousy between marshals over their different jurisdictions. There was also little incentive among Deputy Marshals to search for potentially dangerous outlaws, their only pay being for fees and a set amount for each criminal they arrested. Unless there was a high enough reward being offered, they would instead choose to focus their attention on petty criminals.

With Bob as the leader, the boys recruited mostly men who had grown up with them in Oklahoma. First recruited were George "Bitter Creek" Newcomb and "Blackfaced" Charlie Bryant, who had received his nickname because of a gunpowder burn on one cheek. Even though Sheriff Kay had given up his pursuit of the boys, they still had a $3000 bounty on their heads posted by Wells Fargo and the Southern Pacific Railroad, encouraging lawmen in the area to pick up where Kay had left off. Leading the pursuit was Bob's old friend, Deputy Marshal Heck Thomas, whose renowned skills as a deputy kept the gang constantly on the move and in hiding. Angered by the charges against Grat and Bill which he knew to be false, Bob decided that the best way to help his brothers would be to acquire enough money to pay for their bail and defense. This resulted in the first robbery at Whorton, May 1891, where the gang stole $1200.

Joining afterwards were Bill Doolin, Dick Broadwell, Bill Powers, and Charley Pierce. The gang was also assisted by Bob's lover Eugenia Moore, known by her aliases "Tom King" and "Miss Mundays", who acted as their informant, but was also a notorious horse thief and outlaw.

When not preying on the railroads, the gang spent their time digging out large rooms into the steep hills in the cedar brakes on the Northern Canadian River. This was on the property of a man named Jim Riley, about eight miles from the present-day town of Taloga, Oklahoma. The deep canyons of the area, covered with dwarf cedar and blackjack oaks, made it an ideal hiding place. Riley would feed the outlaws, and would do the same for any passing officers, but he would never reveal each other's whereabouts to either parties.

In August 1891, Charlie Bryant was spotted in Hennessey, Oklahoma, after leaving the gang's hideout to visit his brother in Mulhall. The locals who identified him notified a deputy marshal named Ed Short. He arrested Bryant and took him on a train to be committed to the jail at Wichita, Kansas, without notifying Marshal Grimes at Fort Smith. Ignoring the advice of the people in Hennessy, he also took the prisoner without a guard. After the train left Hennessey, and was approaching the stop at Waukomis, Oklahoma, Short noticed a group of mounted men who looked as if they were trying to beat the train, and feared it was the Dalton Gang coming to free Bryant. Short took the prisoner back and placed him in the baggage car. He then put the baggage man in charge of Bryant and gave him his revolver. Short then went to the rear platform with his rifle. The baggageman carelessly stuck the revolver into a pigeon-hole messagebox and went to work at the other end of the car. Without making any noise, Bryant went to the messagebox and secured the revolver. He then ordered the baggageman to ignore him and to go back to his work. Bryant opened the door to the rear platform, and, while Short had his attention on the mounted men, shot him in the back point blank. Short then turned and the two shot each other to death.

The second train robbery by the Dalton Gang in Oklahoma was at a small station called Lelietta on September 15, 1891, about four miles north of Wagoner, Oklahoma. Here, they secured more than $19,000. Many members of the gang, including Emmett, complained that the $3500 each was not enough to meet their needs. Bill Doolin complained that Bob was not dividing the money fairly, and accused Bob of squandering their money on women and gamblers. Doolin quit the gang, along with Newcomb and Pierce, due to the mismanagement of finances.

=== Grat's escape ===
On September 21, Grat Dalton was brought into court to face sentencing, but this was instead postponed to October 6. This was a date that Grat had no intention on making. Rumors had circulated for months that Bob had planned to come and liberate Grat, so two of sheriff Kay's deputies, Jim Wagy and Bob Hockett, had been hired by Wells Fargo to guard Grat's cell until he was sentenced and sent to San Quentin. This was in addition to the jailer, J.M. Williams. One night, Jim Wagy heard a noise in the basement and upon investigation discovered that someone had tried to break the lock to the grated window. He decided to watch the outside of the place at night to see if he could catch in the act whoever was trying to open the grating. Wagy hid all night in a yard across the street but saw nothing. Instead he caught a cold from sitting in the fog all night. The next morning, Grat called Wagy over to his cell and asked him where he got such a cold. Wagy told him that he must've slept in a draft, to which Grat replied, "Yes, it must have been pretty cold in the yard over there last night." Grat could not see the yard Wagy had laid in from his cell and the deputy had not told anyone what he had done that night. Expecting there to be an escape, and because none of the other deputies would listen to him, Wagy decided to quit.

On the night of September 27, Grat and two cellmates, Arvil Beck and W.B. Smith, escaped from the Tulare County jail in Visalia while Sheriff Kay was in San Francisco. At first, it looked to Kay as if it had been an inside job as it was obvious Grat had simply unlocked the cell door with a key and broke through the basement window to get out. They did however find pieces of a file and a hack saw blade in the prisoner's toilet. Bill had been in a separate cell from Grat, located upstairs. When approached by Kay, Bill told him, "The boys were there when I went to sleep, and when I awakened they had unlocked and gone. Why in the world do you suppose they went away and left me behind?"

Jim Wagy also showed up after the break out to overlook the scene. By that time, Bill had been moved downstairs into what was Grat's cell. When Jim approached Bill said, "Jim, the birds have flown." When they entered the cell, Bill took out his guitar, sat on a soap box, leaned against the bars of the corridor and began to play a popular song he put his own words to and titled, "You'll Never Miss My Brother Till He's Gone". While Bill was playing his guitar, Wagy noticed that he was trying to cover up where the break had been made. One of the bars had been cut out and replaced with a broom handle blackened by soot. Wagy said, "Here is your hole", and kicked the broom handle onto the floor. Bill immediately threw his guitar on the bed and exclaimed, "Now what in the world do you know about that? How did they ever cut that bar out without my knowing it?"

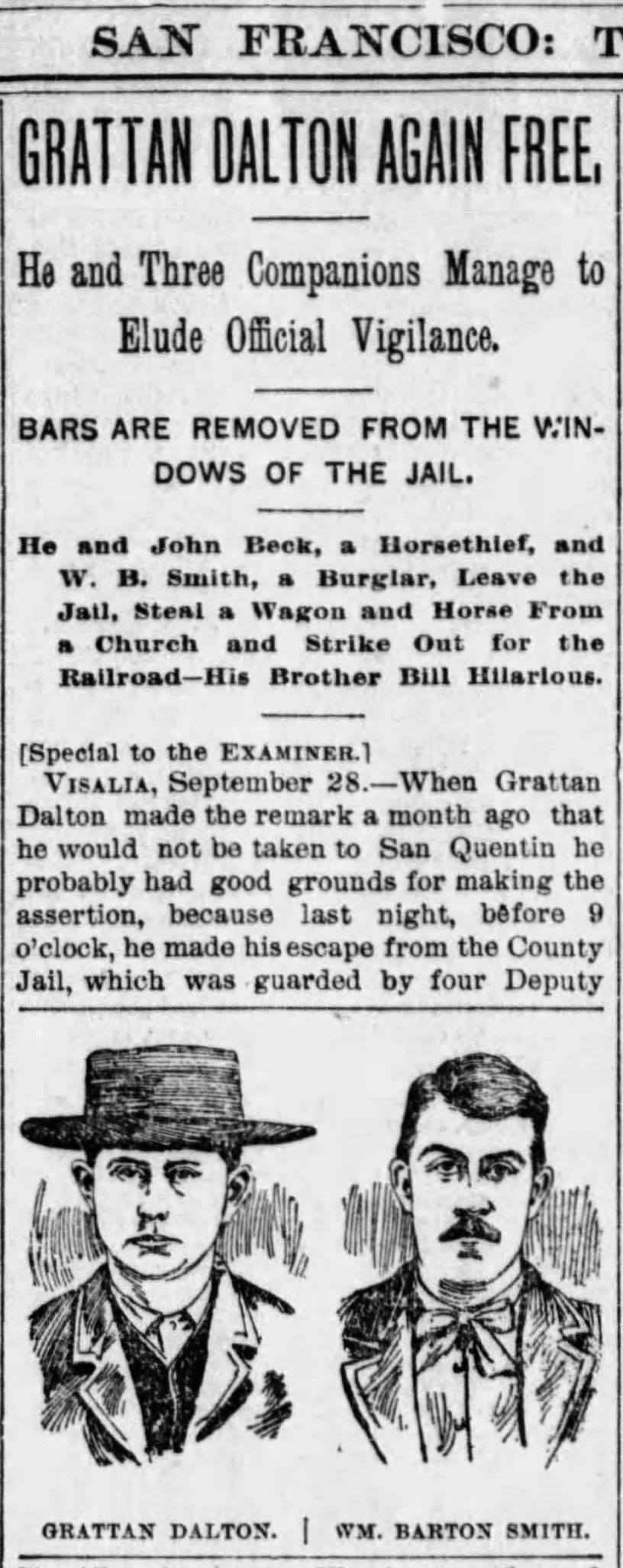
San Francisco Examiner article published September 29, 1891

Most officers believed that Grat immediately escaped the county, but Sheriff Kay thought otherwise. After spending a few weeks tracking and arresting Arvil Beck and W.B. Smith, Sheriff Kay learned from them that Grat had actually made the opening in the bars several days before the robbery after being slipped a saw from someone on the outside. The sawing was hid from the jailer by a large box that they would put a blanket over and use to play cards. The cellmates would sing and talk to drown out the sound of the saw. Each time they stopped sawing, they plugged the hole with soap and soot. After making the opening, they ran around the corridors, kitchen, and basement for several nights. This is why Grat was able to notice Deputy Wagy hiding in a yard across the street from the jail. The last night they dug a hole in the brickwall of the wood room, but found heavy iron bars embedded in the wall that they could not get in between. They used the bar they had cut out to pry open the grating in the wood room window and, instead of risking going and putting it back, left the broom handle in its place.

After the escape, Beck separated from the others and went north, while Grat and Smith went to a friend of Grat's named Joe Middleton, who lived in Hanford. Grat and Middleton told Smith they planned to hide out in the Coast Range and invited him to come with them. Smith instead went north and several weeks later was arrested by Kay. Threatened with prison time, Smith told Kay that Middleton could be followed to Dalton's camp when he carried him supplies.

After having a deputy watch Middleton's place, he learned that Middleton was buying enough groceries to last three months and was seen driving east of Sanger. When Middleton returned, Kay arrested him at his home and threatened to send him to San Quentin if he did not give up Grat's hideout. Middleton had been threatened by Dalton for not helping him escape the country fast enough and was afraid of him. He told Kay that Grat's camp was on a steep mountain in the Sierra Nevada, close to the Kings River and about fifteen miles northeast of Sanger, but that they would never find the place. The mountain was a natural fortress, rocky and heavily wooded, with a good view of the surrounding countryside. This mountain would later be known as Dalton Mountain. He also said that Grat was accompanied by Riley Dean, the man who had been arrested with Bill for the Ceres robbery, as well as a dog. Kay promised Middleton secrecy, and a horse and buggy, if he led him to within a half mile of Dalton's camp.

Since Grat's location was in Fresno County, Kay telegraphed Sheriff Hensley in Fresno, and the two made plans to assemble a posse in Centerville. After pointing out the location of the camp, Middleton left in a hurry and the two posses spent the night on the living room floor of the nearby Elwood ranch. The next day, Christmas Eve, 1891, the posse of both Sheriff Kay and Sheriff Hensley woke up at three in the morning and ascended the mountain to Dalton's camp. It had been raining for several days prior, and it was so cold the ground was covered in ice. The posse reached Dalton's camp at nine and split into two groups in order to surround the camp, Kay leading one and Hensley the other. Kay and his men made their way to a rock ledge that Middleton told them would bring them within a few feet above Dalton's camp.

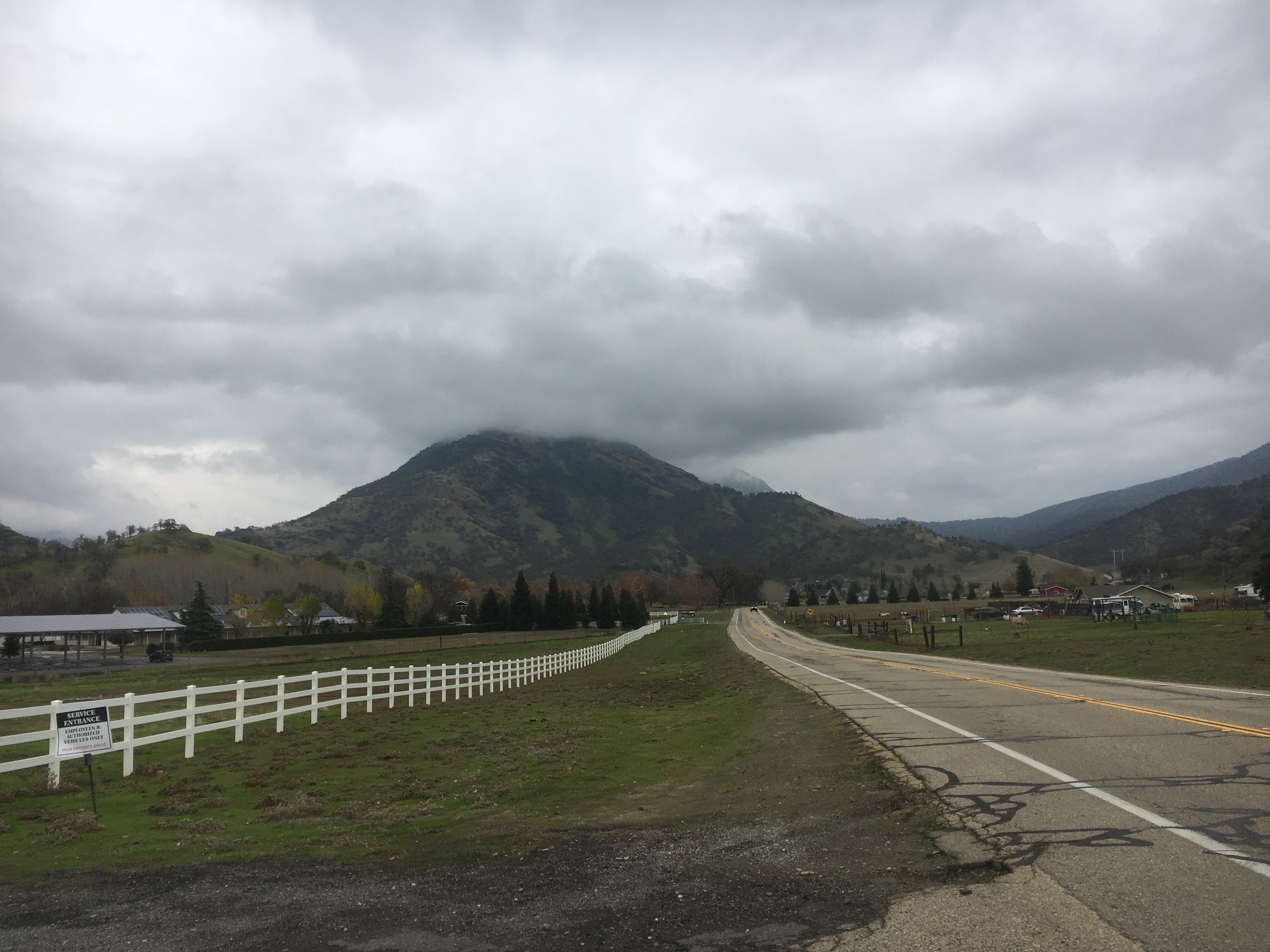
Dalton Mountain, Fresno County, California, Christmas Eve 2019, as viewed from the Wonder Valley Ranch Resort. The traditional name for the mountain given by the Choinumne tribe of Yokuts is Piakchin.

From their position, Kay and his deputies were fifty yards from Dalton and Dean, who were both discussing their plan to hunt one of Elwood's hogs for Christmas dinner. Kay's deputies were carrying ten gauge, double-barrel shotguns, loaded with buckshot, and they leveled them at Dalton. There was a moment where Dalton could have been shot in cold blood, and some of Kay's deputies wanted to do it, but Kay and Hensley would not allow it. Grat and Riley then made their way out of camp with their rifles on their backs and Kay decided they would set up an ambush and wait for their return. The men split into three groups to cover all approaches to the camp.

Sheriff Hensley and deputy Ed McCardle were guarding a trail that led to the summit of small and narrow ridge. Around eleven, they noticed Dalton and Dean returning from their hunt, so they sent deputy Perry Byrd to go and retrieve Kay. They hid behind some rocks and an oak tree and waited as one of the men approached them. They waited until the heavy bearded, two-hundred and thirty pound man was thirty feet from them. The lawmen aimed their rifles at the man and Hensley ordered him to drop his rifle and unbuckle his revolver belt. The man was Riley Dean and he did as he was told. Hensley grabbed Dean and took him over the ridge to Kay so they could handcuff him to an oak tree.

Right as Hensley left, deputy McCardle heard the sound of footsteps come from the same direction where they had spotted Dean. He then saw Grat begin to approach over the hill and planned to wait until he was thirty feet from him before making an arrest. Right before the deputy ordered Grat to drop his weapon, a dog appeared ten feet from Grat and began barking at the lawman. Grat and McCardle fired at each other almost simultaneously. Grat lowered his winchester, fired, and jumped behind cover all in one quick motion. McCardle's bullet flew straight over Dalton, but Grat's bullet struck the tree within inches of McCardle's face and filled his eyes with bark. Grat dropped to the ground and rolled into a gulch about ten feet away. He then quickly charged down the mountainside tearing through the brush.

The posse tried firing at Grat through the brush, but he managed to run the mile back to Elwood's ranch. Judson Elwood was plowing his six-horse team when he heard the shots up the mountain. He began walking behind his plow when he felt a rifle poke him in the ribs. Grat ordered Elwood to unhitch one of his horses, which he did. Grat rode away from the house, jumped the horse over an old rock fence, and began yelling and firing his revolver in the air so that Dean would know that he had escaped. He then rode away with the dog running ahead of him.

Grat first rode to Charles Owen's ranch across from Clovis Cole where he stayed for a few days. Officers were watching Lit at Clovis Cole's, but did not think to watch Owen's place. Grat then rode to a home seven miles south of Livingston, the home of his friend ex-supervisor W.W. Gray. The weather conditions during his escape led him to becoming sick with pneumonia, so he stayed near Livingston for several weeks, sleeping in Gray's cupola and watching the surrounding plains with an eyeglass for any sight of a posse. When Grat recovered, he was able to escape with the help of his brother Cole. They cut through Antelope Valley and skirted the desert down to San Diego County before taking the old trail to Yuma. The two left California in February 1892 and rode for a hundred and seven days before reaching Kingfisher. By the time Grat reached his mother's he had lost forty pounds. Cole had split up with Grat at Gila Bend, Arizona after the two got in argument in which Cole was trying to convince Grat not to join Bob and Emmett.

=== Oklahoma ===
Grat returned to Oklahoma in the spring of 1892 and shortly afterward joined his brothers gang. Some time later, the three dissatisfied members also returned and new plans began to form. Bill had returned to Oklahoma several months earlier, living at his mother's house near Kingsfisher. After being found innocent by a Visalia jury, Bill was acquitted and released on October 15. He then sold the lease to his ranch in San Luis Obispo County, moved his family to his wife's parents in Livingston, California, and left for Kingfisher. Though he did not participate in any of the hold-ups with his brothers, he acted as their spy and advisor.

On June 1, 1892, the gang robbed the Santa Fe train at a small station called Red Rock at 10pm. Here, the Santa Fe had found out about the Daltons' plans and attempted to set up a trap for the gang, filling the train with heavily armed officers. They made the mistake of leaving the train dark, though, which made Bob suspicious, and the gang allowed the train to go by. They then robbed the next train a few minutes later, securing about $50,000. The $50,000, however, came out to only $1800 after drafts and securities had been thrown out. After splitting the money among themselves, the gang soon realized they needed to rob another train.

The night before the robbery at Red Rock, Judge Burford, US District Attorney for Oklahoma Horace Speed, and deputy marshal George Yoes (son of Marshal Jacob Yoes, the Daltons former employer at Fort Smith) were sitting in a hotel lobby in Kingfisher, where they were talking about the cases that would be in court the next day. Bill Dalton came into the hotel lobby and began to speak to deputy Yoes in a loud voice, so everyone around them could hear. At 10pm he looked at his watch and announced to Yoes aloud that it was his bedtime, but that he would be back to have breakfast with him in the morning. After he left, the judge asked Yoes who the man was, as he seemed educated and well-informed. Yoes told the judge that he was Bill Dalton, the brother of the notorious train robbers, and the judge asked him to introduce them when he came to breakfast. Bill arrived for breakfast like he said, and the four of them took the same table. At about 8am, a telegraph messenger came into the room and handed the deputy marshal a telegram, reporting the robbery at Red Rock by the Daltons at 10pm the previous night. The deputy handed the message to Judge Burford, who read it aloud to the audience. As soon as the judge had finished, Bill announced, "Well, I can prove that I was not there, and not by accident either."

The next robbery was on July 14, at Adair, Oklahoma, near the Arkansas border. At the station, the gang took what they could find in the express and baggage rooms. They sat to wait for the next train on a bench on the platform, talking and smoking, with their Winchester rifles across their knees. When the train came in at 9:45 pm, they backed a wagon up to the express car and unloaded all the contents. The eight armed guards on the train all happened to be at the back of the train when it pulled in. They fired at the bandits through the car windows and from behind the train. In the gunfight, 200 shots were fired. None of the Dalton gang was hit. Doctors W. L. Goff and Youngblood were sitting on the porch of the drug store near the depot. Both men were hit several times by stray shots; Dr Goff was fatally wounded. Also wounded were captains Kinney and LaFlore, but they recovered. The gang secured about $18,000. They were also accused of robbing a bank in El Reno, Oklahoma, on July 28, but this was based on little evidence, as no one identified any members of the gang.

After the robbery at Adair, officials of the Missouri-Kansas-Texas Railroad offered a reward of $40,000 for anyone who could capture and convict the Dalton Gang, and a reward of $5,000 for the arrest of any of them.

== Coffeyville bank robbery ==
Coffeyville Bank Robbery
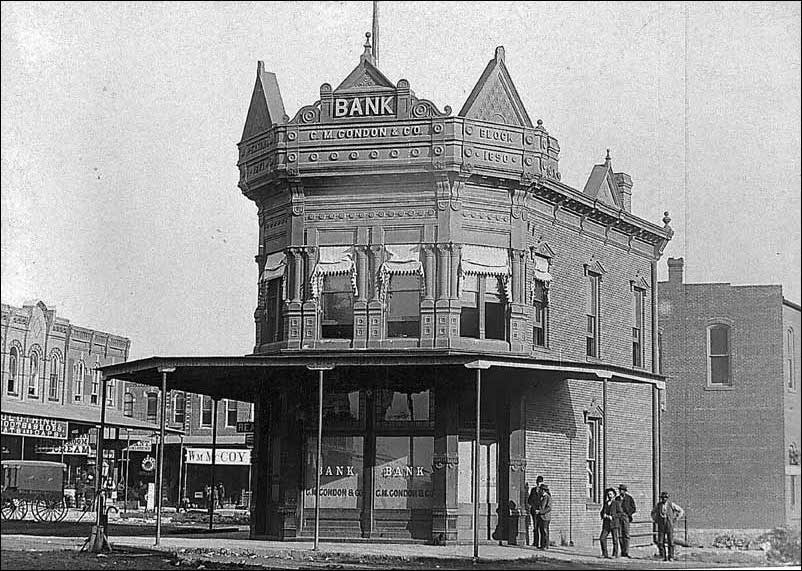
- Condon Bank Coffeyville, Kansas, circa 1890, one of the two banks the Dalton Gang attempted to rob
Date	October 5, 1892
Location	Coffeyville, Kansas
Result	Dalton Gang suppressed

Belligerents
Dalton Gang	Coffeyville civilians and marshals

Commanders and leaders
Robert Dalton †	Town Marshal Charles Connelly †

Strength
5 outlaws	N/A

Casualties and losses
4 killed 1 wounded and captured	3 civilians and a town marshal killed 1 civilian wounded

Bob Dalton had ambitions. He would, he claimed, "beat anything Jesse James ever did—rob two banks at once, in broad daylight." On October 5, 1892, the Dalton gang attempted this feat when they set out to rob the C.M. Condon & Company's Bank and the First National Bank on opposite sides of the street in Coffeyville, Kansas. Bob had planned the entire robbery. Emmett, however, was against the idea. He had gone to school at Robbins Corners near Coffeyville, and knew several hundred people in town. He was afraid some of his friends would be hurt, but Bob assured him there would not be any shooting, and that it would all be over before anyone knew what happened. The plan was that Bob and Emmett were to rob the First National Bank while Grat, Broadwell, and Powers robbed the Condon Bank across the street. Emmett thought Grat would mess things up if he went alone with Powers and Broadwell, and thought they should trade places. This led to a heavy argument between Bob and Emmett and created bitterness between them on the way to the robbery.

Bob had planned for the gang to tie their horses to a post behind the Condon Bank, where it was protected from the center of town by brick walls. They had not been to the town for several years, though, and the hitching post had since been removed during street work. Bob would not allow Emmett to check out the town beforehand in fear that he would be recognized, so this was not factored into their plan. When they arrived, Bob had to think quickly, and decided instead to tie their horses in an alley across from the bank to the west, near the city jail, which offered them little protection. This is now known as Death Alley.

On the morning of October 5, the gang emerged from the alley onto the plaza of Coffeyville. A storekeeper who was sweeping the sidewalk a few feet away noticed Bob, Emmett, and even Grat, who was wearing a fake mustache, and ran inside his store. In close order, the five crossed Walnut Street from the alley to the Condon Bank, holding Winchester rifles close along their legs. Grat, Broadwell, and Powers entered the Condon Bank and Emmett and Bob hurried across Union Street to the First National Bank. Street work was being done at the time, and one of the workers noticed the men dog-trotting across the alley with rifles, and began to yell, "The Daltons are robbing the bank!" Very soon, half the businessmen around the plaza knew what was going on, and the message quickly passed throughout the town.

Grat entered the Condon Bank and pointed his Winchester at the cashier, ordering his hands up, while Powers and Broadwell took positions at the door. Grat went to the back office and ordered the manager into the front, he then handed the cashier a sack bag and ordered him to fill it with cash from the money drawer. Then, noticing the vault door was open, Grat ordered both of them into the vault, where the safe with the gold was. When told to open the safe, the manager lied, telling Grat it was a time lock and that it would not open for another 10 minutes. Grat believed him and decided he would wait until it opened. He then ordered the bags of silver on the vault floor into his bag, containing $1000 and weighing about 200 lb.

Meanwhile, Emmett and Bob had entered the First National Bank, covered the officers and two customers, and ordered the cashier, Thomas Ayres, to open the safe with gold and cash. They put the gold into the sack, forced Ayres in front of them as cover, and went out the front door. They had planned to meet with Grat and cross the plaza to the alley, where they could make their escape, but word of the robbery had spread through town. As they exited the door, an American Express agent opened fire with his revolver. Bob and Emmett returned fire and left Ayres on the sidewalk. They turned around, and went through the back door, carrying both rifles and sack bags, while taking two other bank employees as cover.

Grat heard the revolver shots from the Express agent. He then decided the sack bag was too heavy to carry, and ordered the silver taken out, then stashed what cash he could fit into his coat pockets. Two hardware stores in the town had, meanwhile, begun passing out guns to the local civilians, who began firing through the windows at the Condon Bank. The three returned fire and held out, waiting for the time lock to open. Several civilians were wounded in the fighting.

When Emmett and Bob went out the back door of the First National Bank, they were met by Lucius Baldwin, who had been watching the door with his pistol. Bob ordered him to drop the gun, and when he failed to answer, shot him with his Winchester, killing him. Bob and Emmett then made their way to the end of the back alley onto Eighth Street, where they could hear the townspeople shooting at the Condon Bank. Outside of a drug store across from the First National, George Cubine was standing with his Winchester aimed at the front door of the bank, awaiting the exit of Bob and Emmett. Bob shot him in the head, killing him. Cubine's partner, Charles Brown, was standing unarmed next to him and went to pick up his Winchester. As he lifted the rifle up, Bob shot and killed him.

After being left on the sidewalk by Bob and Emmett, Thomas Ayres had run into one of the hardware stores and grabbed a rifle. He spotted Bob just as he had killed Brown and aimed his rifle at him from behind the store window. Bob saw Ayres from about 200 ft away and quickly shot him in the head. Ayres was not killed, but he remained paralyzed for life.

In the midst of the shooting, Powers told Grat he had been hit in the arm. Grat ordered the employees to lie on the floor in the back office, and after receiving the signal from Bob, told Powers and Broadwell that it was time to leave. The three went out the side door crouching and dashing across Walnut Street to the alley where they had hitched their horses. Bob and Emmett met Grat and the others in the alley, the sacks of money still over their arms.

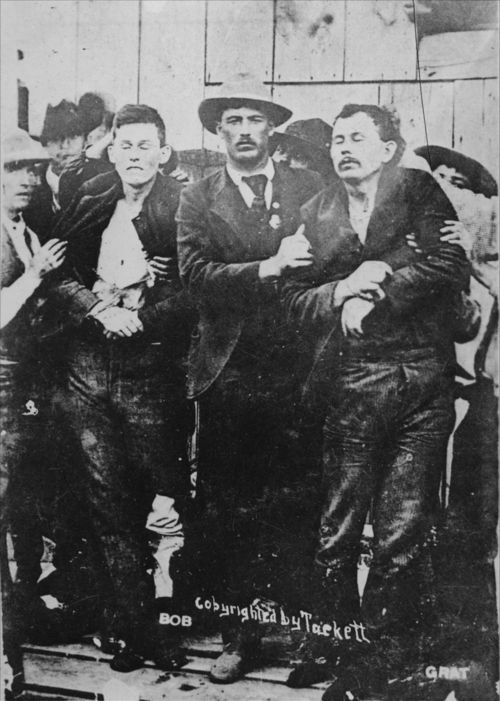
Law enforcement officers hold up the bodies of Bob (23) and Grat (31) Dalton after the attempted bank robbery in Coffeyville, Kansas

As the Daltons made their way west down the alley towards the horses, Town Marshal Charles T. Connelly came through the livery stable into the alley and ran east towards the plaza without noticing the bandits behind him. Grat then shot him in the head and killed him. Following behind Marshal Connelly was John Kloehr, still in the stable. Grat noticed him, but before he could aim, Kloehr shot him in the throat.

Taking fire from the hardware store, Bob was hit in the head and the heart, killing him instantly. Powers tried to mount his horse, but shots from the store also killed him. Emmett was able to mount his horse unwounded, and began riding away, but after noticing Bob was hit, turned around and attempted to lift Bob onto his horse. Emmett was then hit in the back with a load of buckshot. Broadwell was hit several times, but managed to ride away. He was found 2 miles away, dead.

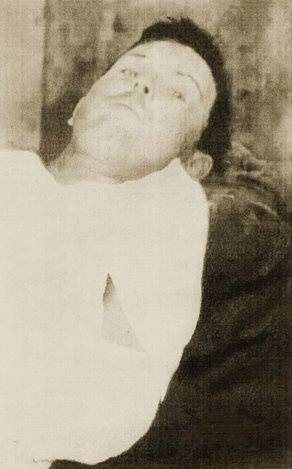
Emmett (21) at the office of Dr. Walter Wells after the attempted bank robbery in Coffeyville

Bill Dalton and Bill Doolin had been waiting several miles away with extra horses to aid the gang's escape. After getting tired of waiting, they left, only to learn later the fate of the gang.

Grat and Bob Dalton, Dick Broadwell, and Bill Powers were all killed. Emmett Dalton received 23 gunshot wounds and survived (he was shot through the right arm, below the shoulder, through the left – right, in some accounts – hip and groin, and received 18-23 buckshot in his back). He was given a life sentence in the Kansas State Penitentiary in Lansing, Kansas, of which he served 14 years before being pardoned by Governor Ed Hoch in 1907. He moved to Hollywood, California, and became a real estate agent, author, and actor, and died in 1937 at age 66. Bill Doolin, "Bitter Creek" Newcomb, and Charley Pierce, none of whom was at Coffeyville, were the only members left of the original Dalton Gang.

Years after the robberies and his release from prison, Emmett Dalton said that the relentless pressure put on them by Deputy US Marshal Heck Thomas as he hunted for them was a key factor in his gang's decision to commit the robberies. They hoped that a big haul from the banks would allow them to leave the territory and escape Thomas' heat.

== Afterward ==
For a time, Bill Doolin and his partners operated under outlaw Henry Starr (Cherokee), hiding out about 75 miles northeast of Kingfisher, from where they made several raids. Doolin, Newcomb, and Pierce visited the Daltons' mother in Kingfisher to console her after her sons' deaths. Brothers Lit and Bill Dalton were also visiting their mother, and Doolin proposed that they join his group to avenge their brothers. Bill Dalton agreed to join them and soon took part in several robberies, but Lit refused in disgust. Henry Starr was arrested in 1893 and held for trial at Fort Smith.

As Doolin and Dalton were accepted as leaders of the gang, it became known as the Doolin-Dalton Gang, and also as the Wild Bunch. Dalton took part in several robberies with the Wild Bunch, including a gun battle on September 1, 1893, at Ingalls, Oklahoma Territory, where three deputy U. S. marshals were killed. Eventually, Bill Dalton left Doolin to form his own Dalton Gang. On May 23, 1894, Dalton and his new gang robbed the First National Bank at Longview, Texas. During the robbery, one member of the gang and four citizens were killed in a shootout. This was the gang's only job. After the gang separated with their share of the loot, Bill hid out with his family in a cabin near Elk, Indian Territory. A posse assembled by U.S. Marshal S.T. Lindsey in Ardmore, Oklahoma, tracked him to the cabin and surrounded it on June 8, 1894. Bill escaped through a window at the back of the house, but as he ran through a patch of corn he was shot and killed by the deputy marshals.

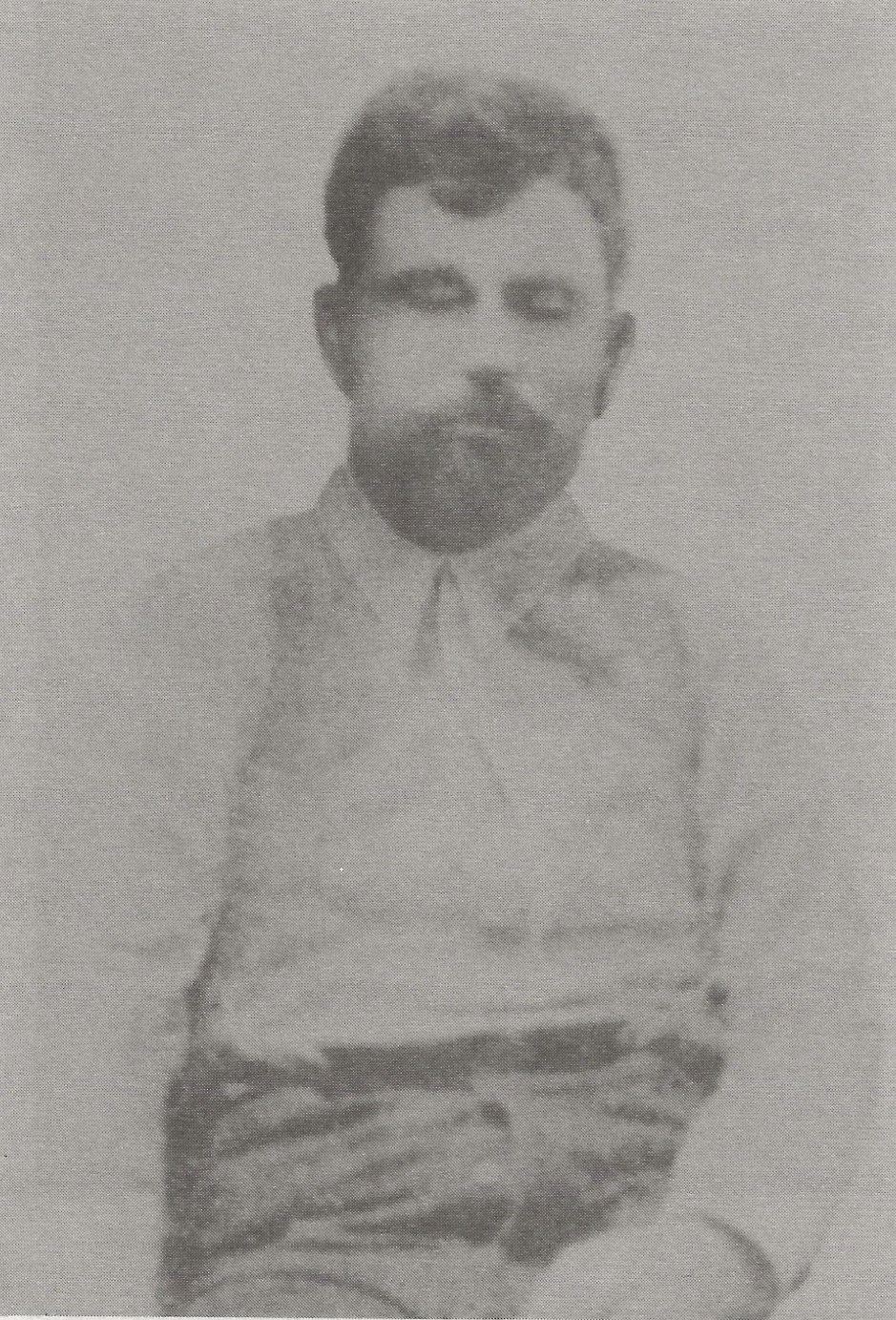
Bill Dalton, in death, June 1894

Lit, the last surviving Dalton brother, responded to a book written by his brother Emmett after the latter's death. Lit said that Emmett's book, When the Daltons Rode (1931), was largely fabrication. Emmett had denied accompanying Bob to California. On his death bed, Emmett told Frank Forrest Latta that he had robbed a train in California, and had used the alias William McElhanie. He asked Latta not to publish the information until after his death.

In her unpublished novella, Grat Dalton's Ride, Eva Evans, the daughter of the famous California outlaw Chris Evans, tells the story of Grat Dalton's escape from California after the Alila robbery. In it she implied that her father was the one who helped Grat Dalton escape from the Visalia Jail, lending credibility to an earlier claim made by Sheriff Gene Kay of this being true. Most of Sheriff Kay's information on Chris Evans came from his deputy Perry Byrd, who also happened to be Evans' brother-in-law, but Kay had other supporting information as well.

Chris Evans and Grat Dalton had become friends while working together in Tulare County during the summer of 1888, at the Grangers Bank of California's wheat warehouses in Tipton and Pixley. This would've been while Grat was on active duty as Deputy Marshal in Indian Territory, but Sheriff Kay claimed that Grat had told him that he had made two extended trips to California while serving as U.S. Marshal. This was also confirmed by Lit Dalton, who had owned a saloon in San Miguel from 1889 to 1890. He claimed that Bob, Grat, and Emmett had all made at least two trips to Bill's ranch in California during that time and that at least one of them would show up to his saloon to get a gallon demijohn full of whiskey to bring back to the rest.

Sometime before the Alila robbery, but after Grat, Bob and Emmett had all arrived at Bill's ranch in 1890, Grat had been rumored to have been in possession of rare two dollar bills. This was only a few months after $2,000 in rare two dollar bills had been stolen during a train robbery outside of Goshen (a robbery later attributed to Chris Evans and John Sontag). Grat had already been known in the San Joaquin Valley as a heavy drinker, fighter, and gambler, so when Kay passed Grat on the street while in Modesto his deputy George Witty was easily able to recognize him. Kay stopped Grat in the street and said, "Say, I hear you have some two-dollar bills. I haven't seen one since I left Missouri. Let me look at one." Kay noticed the bills were perfectly new and asked Grat where he got them. Grat began to say something about a horse, but then became suspicious. Knowing Grat must've sold or hired a horse, Kay sent Witty to investigate while he kept Grat in sight. Kay hung around Grat for a few hours and talked to him most of the time until Witty returned. Witty had gone to the livery stable in Modesto, at the time being jointly run by Chris Evans and John Sontag, and learned that Grat had sold the horse to Evans who in turn gave him the two dollar bills. Evans, however, claimed that he had received the bills from the Sol Sweet store after cashing a check there. Kay apologized to Grat and let him go, but upon visiting the Sol Sweet store Kay learned that Evans had received gold instead of two dollar bills when cashing his check. Kay did not think much of this until later, when Perry Byrd mentioned Chris breaking Grat out of jail. Kay believed Chris was either protecting himself by helping Grat break from jail or returning the favor for Grat protecting him. Chris was also reported by a Visalia newspaper to have attended every day of Grat's trial for the Alila robbery. This was also confirmed by Lit Dalton who had also attended the trial and claimed to have had several hour long conversations with Evans.

There has been much debate over the identity of the "sixth man at Coffeyville", reported by witnesses who claimed was accompanying the gang as they arrived in town right before the robbery. The account given on October 7, 1892, by Coffeyville's The Journal is considered to be the most authentic on events the day of the robbery. The Journal acknowledged witnesses statements then and in a later article that there were two major unanswered questions: who was the sixth man seen riding into town with the gang, and what happened to him?

The Journal then went to state that, "The other dead body proved to be that of Tom Evans..." and marked number six on their map of the shooting area as "Where Tom Evans fell" and in three other references to him The Journal called him Tom. For some reason, however, the body was buried as Bill Powers. While six men were confirmed to have been seen riding into town, other witnesses that day were all in agreement that upon reaching town there were only five men in the group. After the attempted robbery, Emmett was taken upstairs above the drug store to be treated by Dr. Wells. In order to persuade the townsfolk not to hang him, he agreed to tell them everything they wanted to know. As Emmett reviewed the roles of the various participants, he concluded by saying, "Then there was Tom Evans down tending the horses." He then corrected himself, saying that he meant Bill Powers. No one then or later asked him about the horse tending remark, but it could not have referred to Bill Powers because his role as an active participant is well recorded. Many newspapers at the time assumed that an unknown member of the gang escaped. Since Emmett had originally attempted to convince his captors that he was Charles Dryden, until he realized that it was hopeless, his word is considered by many to be of questionable value. If someone in the gang had escaped, there would be nothing gained by Emmett for admitting it. It has been speculated by those seeking to answer the confusion that Bill Powers possibly escaped and it was Tom Evans who was killed, as originally reported, or that Tom Evans was just an alias of Bill Powers.

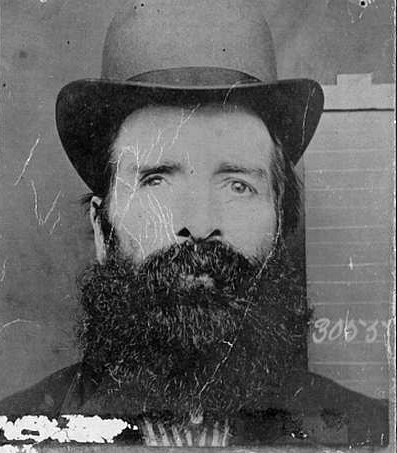
Chris Evans, February 21, 1894

Bill Powers was somewhat of a man of mystery. The Journal reported that, "no one has yet been found who knows him or anything of his antecedents or history." Tom Evans, on the other hand, was reported to be the fraternal twin of outlaw Chris Evans, who at the time of the Coffeyville raid was a fugitive hiding out in the southern Sierra Nevada mountains. Chris Evans' family ridiculed reports of any such involvement or that Tom had been killed, but otherwise never disclosed his actual whereabouts. Chris had continually attested his innocence and any confirmation of his already rumored association with the Dalton Gang would have damaged his case. A later report in the Visalia Times-Delta, a major newspaper in Visalia, California, attributed to "a relative of Mrs. Evans" (most likely Chris Evans brother-in-law Perry Byrd, a deputy of Sheriff Gene Kay) stated, "Tom Evans killed at Coffeyville, Kansas, when the Dalton brothers made their famous raid on the banks of that town, was the twin brother of Chris."

There have been several other nominees suggested to be the sixth man seen riding into Coffeyville, including Bill Dalton, George Newcomb, and Bill Doolin, none of which have ever been confirmed.

== Gallery ==
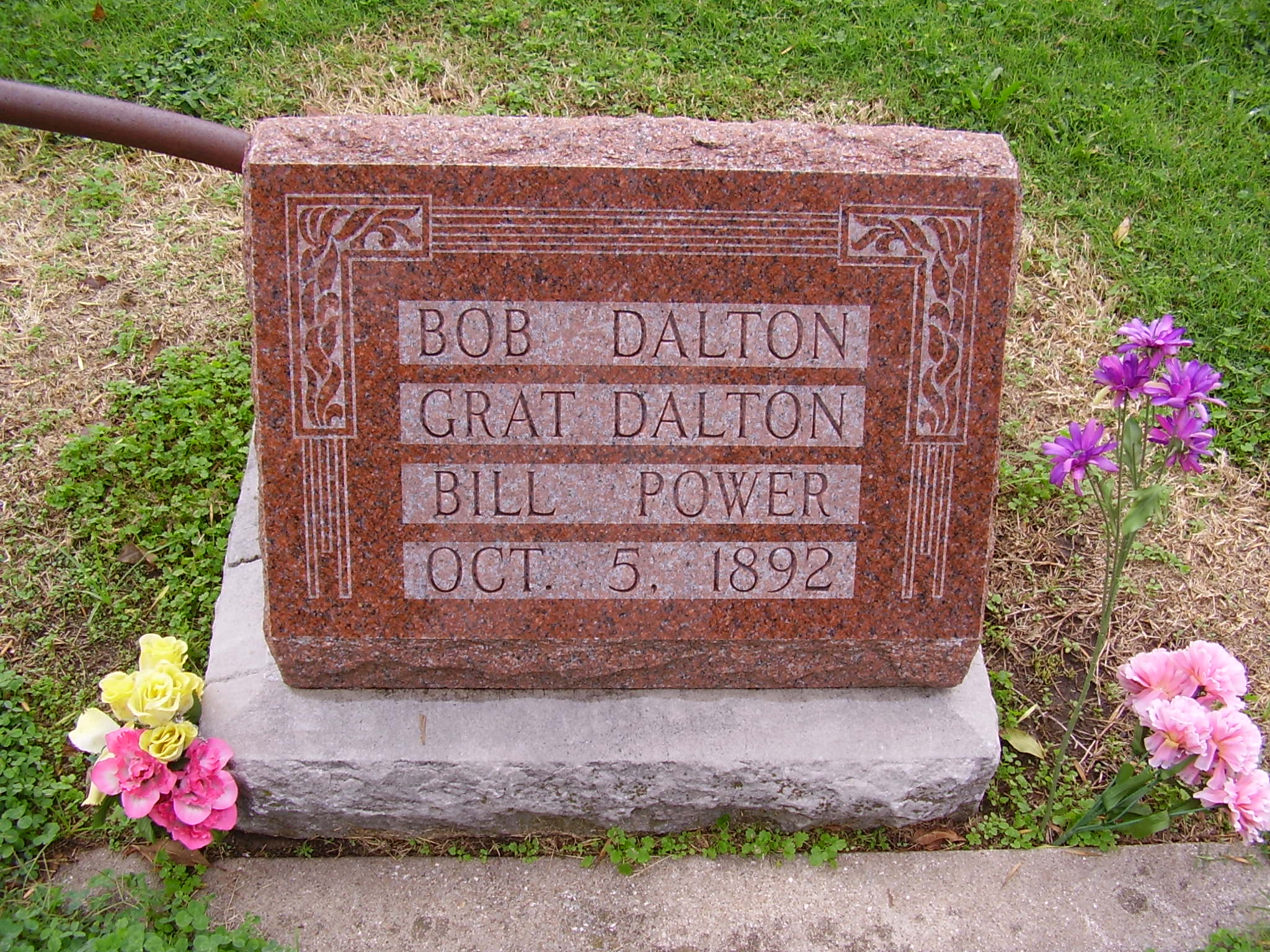
Grave of Dalton gang in Coffeyville, Kansas

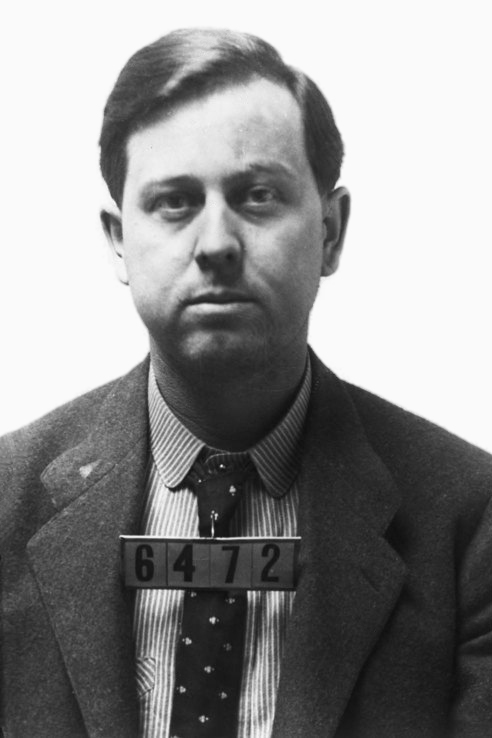
Emmett Dalton

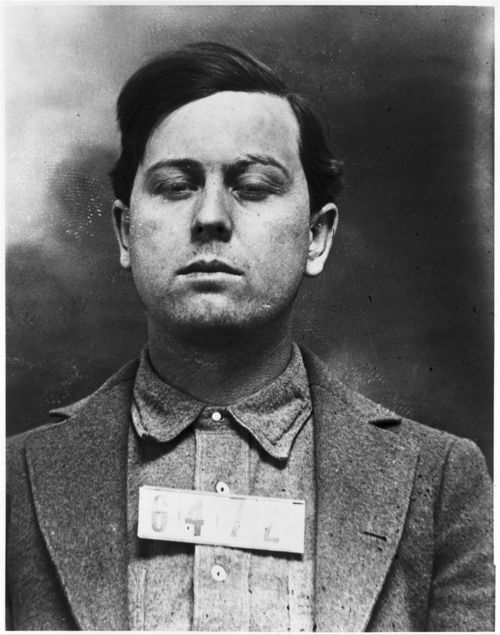
Prison photo of Emmett Dalton

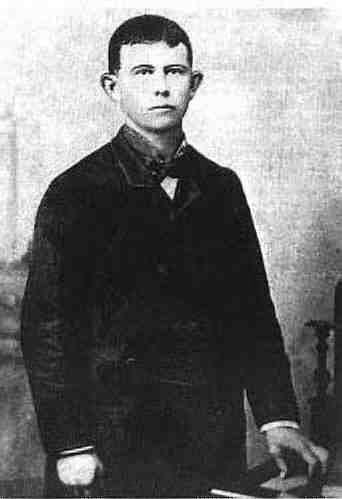
Grat Dalton

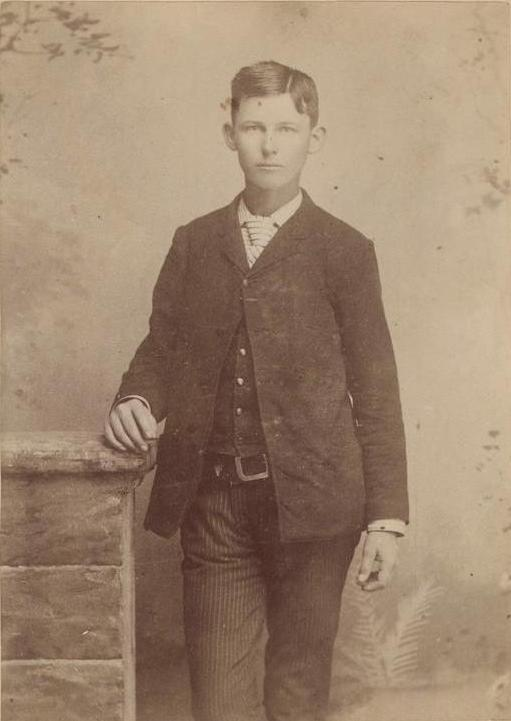
Bob Dalton, 1887

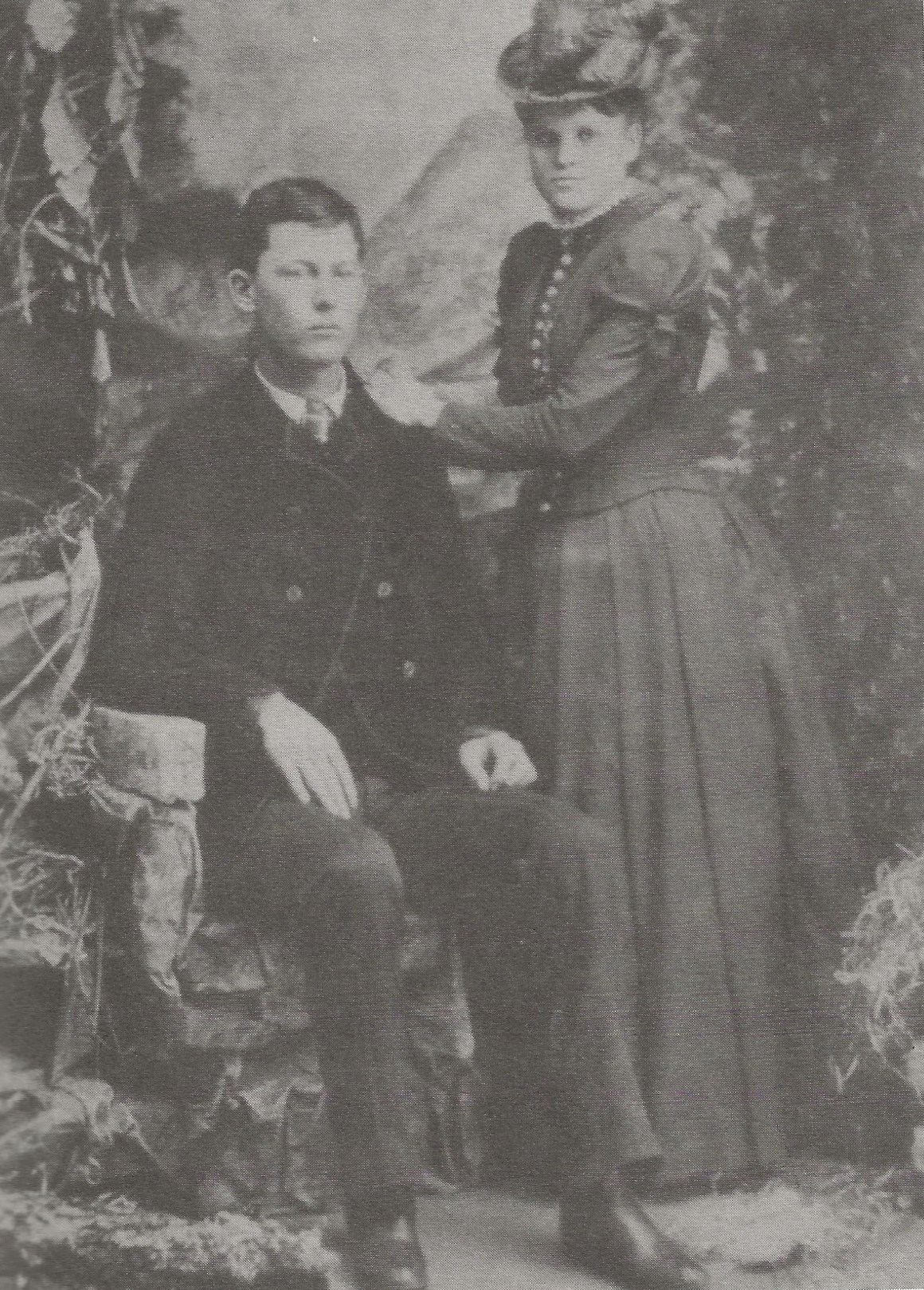
Bob Dalton, with an unidentified woman (possibly Eugenia Moore), May 9, 1889

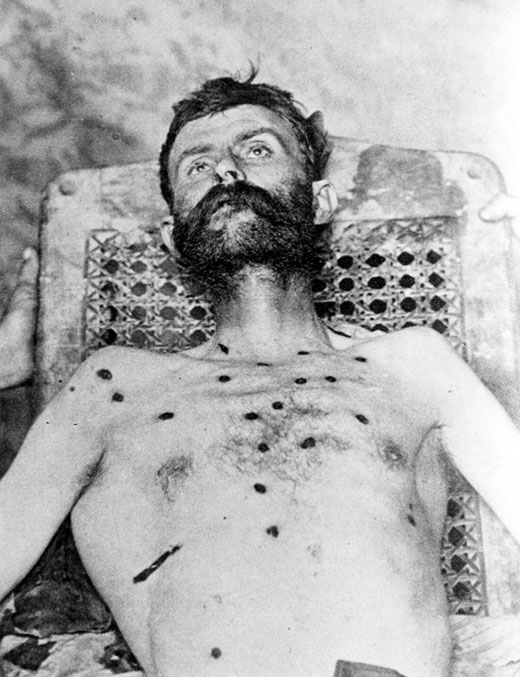
Bill Doolin

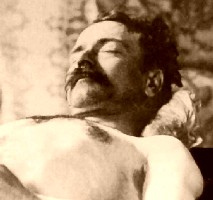
George "Bitter Creek" Newcomb

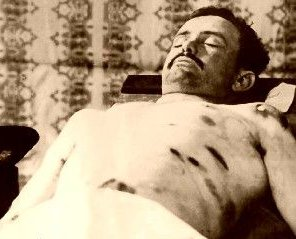
Charley Pierce

== In popular culture ==
- A largely fictional film version of the Daltons' lives was adapted from Emmett's 1931 book, When the Daltons Rode. Released in 1940, it starred Randolph Scott, Broderick Crawford, and Brian Donlevy.
- The Daltons were featured in Randolph Scott's Western, Badman's Territory (1946).
- The Daltons were also featured in yet another Randolph Scott Western, Return of the Bad Men (1948), loosely based on Doolin's leadership of an outlaw gang in Oklahoma Territory, combining the remnants of the original Dalton gang with new members to become the Wild Bunch.
- Randolph Scott himself plays Bill Doolin in the film The Doolins of Oklahoma (1949), in which he is depicted as a reluctant outlaw forced into a leadership role by circumstances after the Coffeyville raid.
- The motion picture The Cimarron Kid (1952), about the Dalton Gang, starred Audie Murphy as Bill Doolin.
- "The Dalton Gang" is a half-hour, 1954 episode of the American TV series Stories of the Century with Myron Healey as Bob Dalton, Fess Parker as Grat, Robert Bray as Emmett, and John Mooney as Bill Dalton.
- The 1954 Franco-Belgian comic book Hors-la-loi, part of the Lucky Luke series, embroiders the Coffeyville events, with the gang made up only of Dalton brothers, all four of whom are killed in the end. Morris's comical depiction of the outlaws — as mustachioed and identically dressed quadruplets differing only in their height — having proved popular, a second fictional gang of Dalton brothers physically indistinguishable from the originals and presented as their (bungling) cousins became recurring villains in the Lucky Luke series, later written by René Goscinny. These were also depicted in several films including La Ballade des Dalton (animated feature, 1978), Lucky Luke (1991) and Les Dalton (2004).
- The Dalton Girls (1957) is a fictional Western B-film in which Dalton sisters continue in the ways of their brothers.
- In 1957, the CBS documentary anthology series episode called You Are There offered the episode "The End of the Dalton Gang (October 5, 1892)", with Tyler MacDuff in the role of Emmett Dalton.
- The May 25, 1959, episode of Tales of Wells Fargo was called "The Daltons", depicting the gang's final heist at Coffeyville.
- Three Minutes to Eternity is a half-hour, 1963 episode (season 12, episode 9, narrated by Stanley Andrews, known as "The Old Ranger") of the TV series Death Valley Days about their last robbery in Coffeyville, with Forrest Tucker as Bob Dalton, Jim Davis as Grat, and Tom Skerritt as Emmett.
- In Charles Portis's novel True Grit (1968), the young heroine Mattie Ross refers to Bob and Grat Dalton as "upright men gone bad" and to Bill Doolin as "a cowboy gone wrong".
- The 1973 song "Doolin-Dalton", by the Eagles, is a song about the Dalton Gang. The album from which the song came, Desperado, has a photograph on its back cover that shows the Eagles band members and songwriters re-enacting the image of the capture and death of the Dalton Gang.
- Robert Conrad starred as Bob Dalton in The Last Day (1975), depicting the events leading up to the gang's attempted robbery of two banks in Coffeyville. The film has a documentary-style voice-over by Harry Morgan.
- Randy Quaid starred in The Last Ride of the Dalton Gang (1979), a portrayal of the gang's attempted robbery of two banks simultaneously in Coffeyville. (The following year, the actor would co-star in The Long Riders, about Jesse James's bank robbery attempt in Northfield, Minnesota, which similarly led to destruction of his gang.)
- The Ron Hansen novel Desperadoes (1979) is a fictional memoir purportedly written by 65-year-old Emmett Dalton in 1937.
- The Dalton Brothers is the name of a parody country and western band briefly impersonated by U2 during their 1987 Joshua Tree U.S. tour.
- The Max McCoy novel The Sixth Rider (1991) tells of the group's exploits from the vantage point of the possible sixth member involved in the Coffeyville bank holdups.
- In the movie Reign of Fire (2002), Matthew McConaughey's character states he had killed a dragon in Coffeyville, Kansas, and refers to the historical shoot-out.
- The video game Call of Juarez: Gunslinger (2013) contains an episode based on the Coffeyville shootout.
- The Dalton Gang is referenced in the Morgan Kane book Killer Kane about the fictional gunslinger.
- The Dalton Gang appears in the Italian comic book Tex, No. 8 and 9.
- Joe Dassin wrote a song called "Les Dalton", inspired by the Lucky Luke characters.
- Hanna-Barbera created various versions of the Dalton Gang in animated productions, most notably with Huckleberry Hound.
- In Payday 2, one of the medic's lines is "You guys are going down like the Daltons", in reference to the gang.
- The video game Red Dead Redemption has a gang called "Walton's gang", loosely based on the Dalton gang.
- Death Alley (2021), a portrayal of the gang's attempted robbery of two banks simultaneously in Coffeyville. Filmed at Old Cowtown Museum in Wichita, Kansas, Flint Hills in Kansas, Sedgwick, Kansas, Lawrence, Kansas, Broken Bow, Oklahoma, Southwest Missouri.

== See also ==
- Smith Gang
