= Bob Dalton =

American outlaw

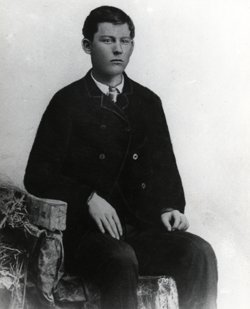
- Born: Robert Rennick Dalton; May 13, 1869; Cass County, Missouri, United States
- Died: October 5, 1892 (aged 23); Coffeyville, Kansas, United States
- Cause of death: Gunshot wound
- Parent(s): James Lewis Dalton; Adeline Lee Younger
- Allegiance: Dalton Gang
- Criminal charges: Bank robbery, train robbery

Robert Rennick Dalton (May 13, 1869 – October 5, 1892) was an American outlaw in the American Old West. Beginning in 1891, he led the Dalton Gang, whose varying members included three of his brothers. They were known for robbing banks, stagecoaches and trains, primarily in Kansas and Oklahoma Territory, quickly attracting pursuit by lawmen.

On October 5, 1892, the gang attempted to rob two banks the same day in Coffeyville, Kansas, hoping to gain enough loot to leave the country. Attacked by civilians and law enforcement officers, Bob and Grat Dalton, Bill Power, and Richard L. "Dick" Broadwell were all killed. Younger brother Emmett Dalton was severely wounded, but survived. He was tried and convicted, and served 14 years in prison before being pardoned. Bill Dalton was not part of this heist.

== Early life ==
Born in 1869 in Cass County, Missouri, Bob was one of nine sons of Lewis Dalton, from Kentucky and Jackson County, Missouri, and his wife Adeline Lee (née Younger). They also had three daughters. His siblings were:

- Charles Benjamin "Ben" Dalton (1852–1936)
- Henry Coleman "Cole" Dalton (1853–1920)
- Littleton "Lit" Lee Dalton (1857–1942)
- Franklin "Frank" Dalton (1859–1887)
- Gratton Hanley "Grat" Dalton (1861–1892)
- William Marion "Bill" Dalton (1863–1894)
- Eva May Dalton (1867–1939)
- Emmett Dalton (1871–1937)
- Leona Randolph Dalton (1875–1964)
- Nancy May Dalton (1876–1901)
- Simon Noel "Si" Dalton (1878–1928)

Brothers who became members of the Dalton Gang were: Bob, Grat, Emmett, and Bill, who was the least involved. After the disaster at Coffeyville in 1892, Bill later joined with Bill Doolin to form the Dalton-Doolin Gang, also known as the Wild Bunch.

Their father Lewis Dalton bred and trained race horses, and bet on them, mostly unsuccessfully. By 1870 he began traveling to California to enter in the race circuits. Starting with his oldest son Ben, he eventually brought the others with him to help. In 1877, while their father was running horses in Visalia, California, the oldest sons were offered steady work but refused at the time.

After returning to Missouri, Ben, Frank, and Littleton (known as Lit) decided to take up the offer and returned to California to work as muleskinners. Grat and Cole eventually followed in 1880. Grat quickly made a reputation as a bar fighter in the many saloons up and down the San Joaquin Valley.

That same year Frank Dalton was offered a job in the Indian Territory (now the state of Oklahoma). He was appointed as a Deputy U.S. Marshal out of Fort Smith, Arkansas.

Bill joined his brothers in California in 1884, where he started a family and settled in San Luis Obispo County. Their father gambled outside of horse racing, and lost the family home in Belton, Missouri as a result. In 1890 their mother Adeline bought a piece of land near Kingfisher, when the Oklahoma Territory was opened for white settlement.

== Lawman career ==
Frank Dalton established a good reputation as a deputy marshal, and was the most noted of the Dalton brothers to be engaged in lawful work. But on Nov 27, 1887 Frank was killed by whiskey bootleggers when he and another deputy attempted to apprehend them. Frank Dalton is buried in Coffeyville, Kansas.

After Frank's death, his brothers Grat and Bob were given his job as Deputy U.S. Marshal at Fort Smith. Bob soon hired Emmett to guard prisoners at the fort's jail. Bob killed a man in the line of duty, which he claimed was in self defense. Drinking heavily, he began to be restless. He was hired by the Osage Nation to organize its police force; he took Emmett with him as a deputy. Grat meanwhile continued to work at Fort Smith.

Bob and Emmett initially established good reputations in the Osage Nation. But in July 1890, they began stealing horses to make more money. Eventually stockmen organized to capture them, and the Daltons fled the Nation. They hid out in the bluffs on the Canadian River about seventy miles southwest of Kingfisher, Oklahoma, and sent for Grat for help. In trying to get them food, horses, and ammunition, Grat was caught and jailed at Fort Smith. After two weeks Grat was released; lawmen hoped he would lead them to his brothers. Bob and Emmett escaped by train to California, where they stayed with their brother Bill at his ranch near San Miguel.

== Outlaw career ==
Grat Dalton returned to California to meet Emmett and Bob at their brother Bill's ranch in January 1891. They worked there for about a month, but also played poker and regularly got into bar fights in San Luis Obispo County. They spent most of the money they had made from horse stealing. Bob began to make plans to rob a train with the help of Emmett and Grat. Their brothers Cole, Lit, and Bill unsuccessfully tried to dissuade them.

On the night of February 6, 1891, two masked men held up a Southern Pacific Railroad passenger train near the town of Alila (present day Earlimart, California). They were reportedly carrying 44-caliber pistols and did not succeed in taking any money. The expressman accidentally killed the fireman during crossfire with the robbers.

Years later, Littleton Dalton said that his brothers, Bob and Emmett, had told him many times that they had robbed the Alila train. Grat had not joined them as he had spent all his money on drinking and gambling in Tulare, California, and could not even rent a horse.

Sheriff Gene Kay of Tulare County tracked the outlaws with his posse to San Luis Obispo County, near San Miguel. Eventually the party found the remnants of a saddle that was missing a leather strap which had been found at the scene of the hold up. It was found at Bill Dalton's ranch. Asking around about the Dalton brothers, Sheriff Kay's posse learned that Bob, Emmett and Grat had spent the past few days drinking heavily, gambling, and following the Southern Pacific pay car as it made its monthly journey down the San Joaquin Valley. By this time their reputation as horse thieves in Indian Territory had followed them to California.

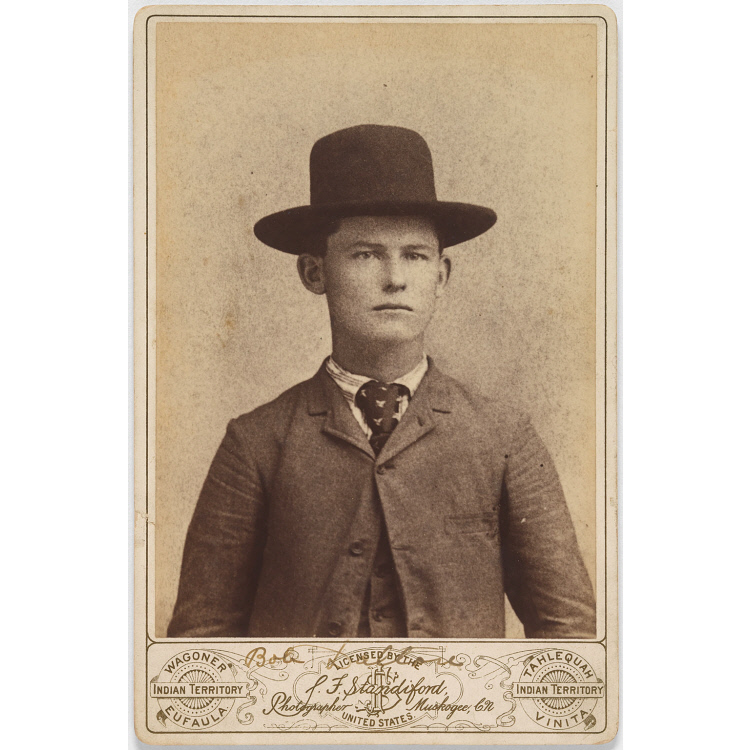
Photo of Robert "Bob" Dalton c. 1889

On March 17, 1891, the Tulare County Grand Jury indicted brothers Bob, Emmett, Grat, and Bill Dalton for the Alila robbery. A few days later, Grat and Bill were arrested and jailed in Tulare County. A $3000 bounty was announced for the capture of Bob and Emmett. Bill had already helped them escape California, and the pair were on their way back to Oklahoma Territory. Bill secured bondsmen and gained release, then hired attorneys to defend Grat, who was jailed in Visalia.

Bob and Emmett had borrowed money and supplies from their brothers, Cole and Lit; they crossed the Mojave Desert. After their horses were discovered at Ludlow, California, Sheriff Kay decided to pursue them with his deputy, Jim Ford. He discovered that the brothers were actually making their way to Utah to throw him off, tracking them to the town of Ogden, Utah. After some close encounters Bob and Emmett escaped capture by train. Sheriff Kay continued to track them throughout the Southwest for several months, even at one point entering Mexico, but with no success. Eventually they ending up at the Dalton home near Kingfisher, Oklahoma. The Daltons had many friends in Oklahoma willing to hide them, and Sheriff Kay gave up the chase to return to California for Grat's trial.

Bob and Emmett robbed a train at Whorton, now Perry, Oklahoma, May 1891. They began forming what would be known as the Dalton Gang.

Even though much of the evidence showed that Grat was in Fresno, California the night of the Alila robbery, including the testimony of several witnesses, the influence of the powerful Southern Pacific Railroad resulted in his having an unfair trail. Grat's lawyer was corrupt. Neither the defense nor the prosecution noted the fact that the fireman had been killed accidentally by the expressman. Grat did not know this either; he and his brothers assumed that Emmett had killed the fireman. Grat was convicted on murder charges and sentenced to life imprisonment.

On September 3, 1891, a train was stopped and robbed near Ceres, California, but the perpetrators did not get any money. As the circumstances were similar to the Alila robbery, Sheriff Kay suspected Bill Dalton, and arrested him and an associate named Riley Dean. Kay found the two at an abandoned overland stage station. He believed they were preparing a robbery or to break Grat out of jail. Both Bill and Dean had alibis for the Ceres robbery, but Kay held Bill in Tulare County Jail to await trial for the Alila robbery.

On September 21, Grat was brought into court to face sentencing, but this was instead postponed to October 6. On September 27, Grat and two other men escaped from the Tulare County Jail. Sheriff Kay was in San Francisco. Someone from outside slipped the men a saw and they got through the bars. Bill was in a separate cell and in the morning he was found playing a guitar, joking about how the boys had left him. Bill was acquitted and released on October 15. He sold the lease to his ranch in San Luis Obispo County, moved his family to his wife's parents in Livingston, California and left for Kingfisher, Oklahoma. After arresting the two other men who escaped with Grat, Sheriff Kay learned that Grat was helped by Riley Dean and that they were both hiding on the summit of a steep mountain close to the Kings River near Sanger, California. This would be known as Dalton Mountain. On Christmas Eve 1891, the posses of both Sheriff Kay of Tulare County and Sheriff Hensley of Fresno County ascended the mountain to Daltons' camp. They ambushed the outlaws on their way back from a boar hunt. Grat managed to escape, firing at the lawmen with his Winchester rifle and stealing a horse from a nearby ranch, but Riley Dean was captured. Grat rode to a friends near Livingston, California and stayed for several weeks before escaping back to Oklahoma with the help of his brother Cole.

In Oklahoma Territory, Bob and Emmett began carefully planning their robberies. With Bob as the leader they recruited mostly men who had grown up with them in that region. These included George "Bitter Creek" Newcomb and "Blackfaced" Charlie Bryant. Bryant was nicknamed because of a gunpowder burn on one cheek.

The gang's first robbery took place at Whorton, May 1891, where they stole $1200. They were later joined by Bill Doolin, Dick Broadwell, Bill Powers, and Charley Pierce. The gang was assisted by Dalton's lover Eugenia Moore, known by her aliases "Tom King" and "Miss Mundays." She informed on law enforcement and also was a notorious horse thief and outlaw.

In August 1891, Bryant was spotted in Hennessey, Oklahoma after leaving the gang's hideout to visit his mother. The locals notified Deputy Marshal Ed Short. He arrested Bryant and took him by train to jail at Wichita, Kansas. He did not have a guard or did not inform US Marshal Grimes at Fort Smith. After the train left Hennessey and was approaching the stop at Waukomis, Oklahoma, Short noticed a group of mounted men that looked as if they were trying to beat the train and feared it was the Dalton Gang coming to free Bryant. Short put the baggage man in charge of Bryant giving him his revolver while he went to the rear platform with his rifle. The baggageman carelessly stuck the revolver into a Pigeon-hole messagebox and went to work at the other end of the car. Bryant secured the revolver and ordered the baggageman to go back to work. He opened the door to the rear platform and, while Short had his attention to the mounted men, shot him in the back. Short turned and they both shot each other to death.

The second train robbery by the Dalton Gang in Oklahoma was at a small station called Lelietta on September 15, 1891, about four miles north of Wagoner, Oklahoma. Here they secured $19,000. Bill Doolin complained that he was not dividing the money fairly and quit the gang along with Newcomb and Pierce. Grat returned to Oklahoma in the spring of 1892. The three dissatisfied members also returned and new plans began to formulate. Bill had also returned several months earlier living at his mothers near Kingsfisher. Even though he did not participate in any of the hold ups with his brothers he acted as a spy and advisor.

On June 1, 1892, the gang robbed the Santa Fe train at Red Rock, Oklahoma securing about $50,000. Here the Santa Fe had found out about the Daltons plans and attempted to set up a trap for the gang filling the train with heavily armed officers. However they made the mistake of leaving the train dark which made Bob suspicious and the gang allowed the train to go by robbing the next train a few minutes later. The $50,000 however came out to only $1800 after draft and securities had been thrown out. It was soon necessary to rob another train.

The next robbery was at Adair, Oklahoma, near the Arkansas border on July 14. At the station the gang took what they could find in the express and baggage rooms. They sat to wait for the next train on a bench on the platform, talking and smoking, with their Winchester rifles across their knees. When the train came in at 9:45 p.m., they backed a wagon up to the express car and unloaded all the contents. The eight armed guards on the train all happened to be at the back of the train when it pulled in. They fired at the bandits through the car windows and from behind the train. In the gun fight, 200 shots were fired. None of the Dalton gang was hit. Doctors W. L. Goff and Youngblood were sitting on the porch of the drug store near the depot. Both men were hit several times by stray shots; Dr Goff was fatally wounded. Also wounded were captains Kinney and LaFlore, but they recovered. The gang secured about $18,000. They were also accused of robbing a bank in El Reno, Oklahoma on July 28, however this was based on little evidence as no one saw any members of the gang.

== Coffeyville raid ==
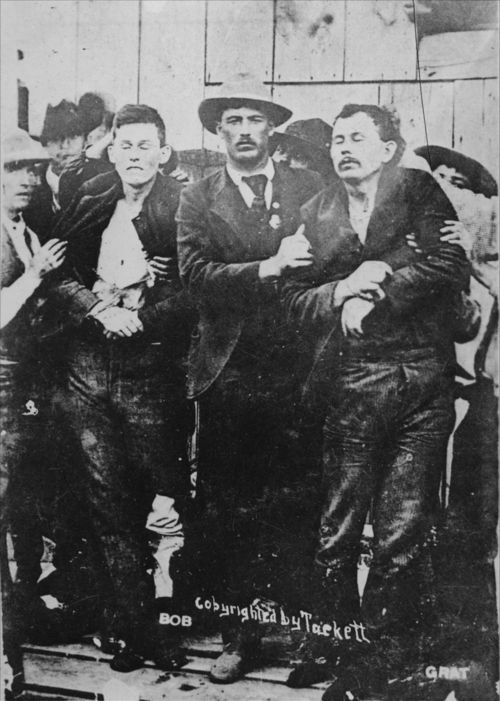
Law enforcement officers hold up the bodies of Bob and Grat Dalton after they were killed during two attempted bank robberies in Coffeyville, Kansas

Bob and his brothers were deeply concerned with the pressure put upon them by the law. They decided to make one last robbery to earn enough money to leave the country. Their plan was to rob two banks in the same town at the same time to get the money and to also make history for accomplishing something that no other outlaw gang had attempted. Their target was their old hometown of Coffeyville, Kansas.

Early on Oct. 5 1892, Bob, Grat, and Emmett Dalton, with Powers and Broadwell, entered Coffeyville. They tied their horses in an alley across from the banks, and walked across, dividing into two groups before entering the Condon National Bank and First National Bank. Well known by the townspeople, they were recognized and an alarm went out. Civilians quickly armed themselves with guns from the local hardware stores and took positions with law enforcement to defend their town. As the Dalton Gang began their escape, a gun battle erupted that killed gang members and four town residents. Emmett, the lone survivor among the gang, was seriously wounded, receiving 23 gunshot wounds. After he recovered, he stood trial for the bank robberies. He was sentenced to life in prison but was granted a pardon by the governor after 14 years.

Deputy US Marshal Heck Thomas remembered Bob Dalton as the most accurate shot he had ever seen. Dalton is buried at the Coffeyville, Kansas Cemetery under a group marker for himself, his brother Grat, and Bill Power.

== Representation in other media ==
- In 1954, Morris produced the Lucky Luke story Hors-la-loi, in which Bob Dalton is shown as the leader of the Dalton gang, leading his brothers Grat, Bill, and Emmett.
- In 1959, Don Kelly portrayed Bob Dalton in an episode of the series Tales of Wells Fargo, entitled "The Daltons."
- The actor Forrest Tucker played Bob Dalton in the 1963 episode "Three Minutes to Eternity" of the syndicated western television series Death Valley Days, which covered the attempted robberies in Coffeyville.
- In 1975 Bob Dalton was played by the actor Robert Conrad in the TV movie western The Last Day.
