= Grat Dalton =

American outlaw

Gratton Dalton
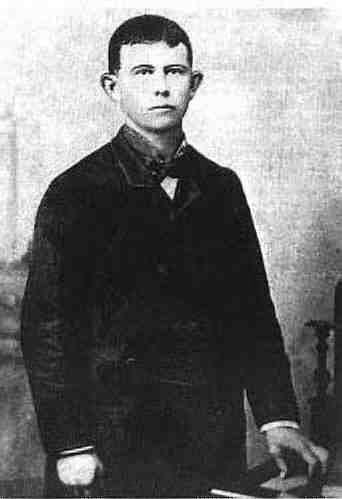
- Born: March 30, 1861; Lawrence, Kansas, United States
- Died: October 5, 1892 (aged 31); Coffeyville, Kansas, United States
- Cause of death: Gunshot wound
- Occupations: Farmer, marshal, cattle rustler
- Allegiance: Dalton Gang
- Criminal charges: cattle rustling, Bank and train robbery

Gratton Hanley "Grat" Dalton (March 30, 1861 – October 5, 1892) was an American outlaw in the American Old West. He was one of three brothers in the Dalton Gang, led by his younger brother Bob Dalton. Both brothers were killed during a shootout in an ill-fated raid on two banks in Coffeyville, Kansas. Their brother Emmett Dalton survived to be convicted and imprisoned for fourteen years.

== Short career as lawman ==
Their older brother Frank Dalton served as a Deputy US Marshal. By all accounts the strongest of the brothers, he always kept his brothers in line. Grat and his younger brothers idolized Frank. On Nov 27, 1887 Frank and another deputy marshal, Jim Cole, went across the river from their base at Fort Sefmith to arrest three whiskey bootleggers. As they approached the camp, the bootleggers began to shoot at them. After Dalton shot and killed two, his gun jammed, and he was killed by the remaining bootlegger. His deputy abandoned him after being shot. Frank Dalton is buried in Coffeyville, Kansas.

After Frank's death, brothers Grat and Bob took over his job as Deputy U.S. Marshal at Fort Smith, Arkansas. Bob soon hired Emmett under him to guard prisoners. After Bob killed a man in the line of duty, which he claimed was in self defense, he began to drink heavily and become restless.

He was assigned to organize a police force in the Osage Nation, Indian Territory, and took Emmett with him as a deputy. Grat stayed at Fort Smith. Emmett and Bob kept good reputations in the Osage Nation until July 1890, when they began stealing horses. Eventually stockmen organized to capture them, forcing the Daltons to flee. Hiding out in the bluffs on the Canadian River about seventy miles southwest of Kingfisher, Oklahoma, they sent to Grat for help.

Grat tried to get them food, horses, and ammunition but was caught and jailed at Fort Smith, where he had formerly worked. After two weeks Grat was released, as lawmen hoped he would lead them to his brothers. Bob and Emmett took a train to California, and stayed with their brother William "Bill" Dalton at his ranch near San Miguel, San Luis Obispo County, California.

Discredited as lawmen, the Daltons would soon form their first gang.

== Organizing the Dalton Gang ==
Grat returned to California to meet Emmett and Bob at their brother Bill's ranch in January 1891. They worked there for about a month while playing poker games and getting in bar fights in San Luis Obispo County, spending most of the money they had made from horse stealing. At this time Bob Dalton began making plans to rob a train with the help of Emmett and Grat. Their brothers Cole, Littleton (Lit), and Bill unsuccessfully tried to dissuade them.

On the night of February 6, 1891 a Southern Pacific Railroad passenger train was held up by two masked men carrying only 44-calibre revolvers near the town of Alila (present day Earlimart, California). No money was taken; however, during the crossfire the expressman accidentally killed the fireman. The outlaws wore masks during the Alila robbery.

Many years later, Littleton Dalton said that his brothers, Bob and Emmett, had told him many times that they robbed that train. Grat had not joined the heist as he had spent all his money on drinking and gambling in Tulare, California, and did not have a horse.

Sheriff Gene Kay of Tulare County and his posse tracked the outlaws to San Luis Obispo County, near San Miguel, California. They found the remnants of a saddle at the ranch of Bill Dalton; it was missing a leather strap that had been found at the scene of the hold up. Finding out what they could about the brothers, Sheriff Kay's posse learned that Bob, Emmett and Grat had spent the past few days drinking, gambling, and following the Southern Pacific pay car as it made its monthly journey down the San Joaquin Valley. By this time their reputation as horse thieves in Oklahoma was also known in California.

On March 17, 1891 the Tulare County Grand Jury indicted brothers Bob, Emmett, Grat, and Bill Dalton for the Alila robbery. A few days later Grat and Bill were arrested and placed in the Tulare County jail. A $3000 bounty was placed for the capture of Bob and Emmett, but Bill had already helped them escape from California before he was arrested. The two were on their way back to Oklahoma Territory. Bill soon secured bondsmen and was released. He quickly hired attorneys to defend Grat. Grat was held in jail in Visalia.

Bob and Emmett borrowed money and supplies from brothers Cole and Lit, and made their way east across the Mojave Desert. After their horses were discovered at Ludlow, Sheriff Kay pursued them with his deputy, Jim Ford. He discovered that the brothers were making their way to Utah to throw him off, and tracked them to the town of Ogden. Bob and Emmett escaped again by train. Sheriff Kay continued to track them throughout the Southwest for several months, but never caught up.

Eventually the brothers returned to the Dalton home near Kingfisher, Oklahoma, where the family had many friends willing to hide them. Sheriff Kay returned to California for Grat's trial. Realizing they were no longer being pursued, Bob and Emmett robbed a train at Whorton, now Perry, Oklahoma, in May 1891. They began forming what would be known as the Dalton Gang.

Even though much of the evidence showed that Grat was in Fresno, California the night of the Alila robbery, including the testimony of several witnesses, the influence of the powerful Southern Pacific Railroad resulted in his having an unfair trail. Grat's lawyer was corrupt. Neither the defense nor prosecution noted that the fireman had been killed accidentally by the expressman. The Dalton brothers had thought that Emmett had killed the fireman. Grat was convicted on murder charges and sentenced to life imprisonment.

On September 3, 1891 a train was robbed near Ceres, California, but the attempt was unsuccessful and no money was lost. The elements were similar to the robbery at Alila. Sheriff Kay suspected Bill Dalton, and arrested him and an associate, named Riley Dean. Kay found Dalton and Dean at an abandoned overland stage station where they looked as if they were either planning a robbery or to break Grat from jail. Both Dalton and Dean had a clear alibi but Kay held Bill in the Tulare County Jail to await trial for his part in the Alila robbery.

On September 21, Grat was brought into court to face sentencing, but this was instead postponed to October 6. On the night of September 27th, Grat and two other men escaped from the County Jail in Visalia while Sheriff Kay was in San Francisco, California. Someone on the outside gave them a saw, and they got through the bars. Bill Dalton had remained in his cell and was found in the morning, playing a guitar, joking about how the boys had left him. Bill was acquitted and released on October 15. He sold the lease to his ranch in San Luis Obispo County, moved his family to his wife's parents in Livingston, California, and left for Kingfisher. After arresting the two other men that had escaped with Grat, Sheriff Kay learned that Grat was helped by Riley Dean and that they were both hiding on the summit of a steep mountain close to the Kings River near Sanger, California. This would be known as Dalton Mountain.

On Christmas Eve 1891, the posses of both Sheriff Kay of Tulare County and Sheriff Hensley of Fresno County ascended the mountain to Daltons camp. They ambushed the outlaws on their way back from a boar hunt. Grat managed to escape, firing at the lawmen with his Winchester rifle and stealing a horse from a nearby ranch, but Riley Dean was captured. Grat rode to a friends near Livingston, California and stayed for several weeks before escaping back to Oklahoma with the help of his brother Cole.

Bob and Emmett had meanwhile been busy in Oklahoma forming their gang. After their unsuccessful career in California they decided they could do much better in their home country and, unlike their first attempts, they began carefully planning their robberies. With Bob as the leader they recruited mostly men who had grown up with them in Oklahoma. First recruited were George "Bitter Creek" Newcomb and "Blackfaced" Charlie Bryant, Bryant received his nickname because of a gunpowder burn on one cheek. This resulted in the first robbery at Whorton, May 1891, where the gang stole $1200. Joined afterwards were Bill Doolin, Dick Broadwell, Bill Powers, and Charley Pierce. The gang was also assisted by Bob's lover Eugenia Moore, known by her aliases "Tom King" and "Miss Mundays", who acted as their informant but was also a notorious horse thief and outlaw.

In August 1891, Bryant was spotted in Hennessey, Oklahoma after leaving the gangs hideout to visit his mother. The locals who identified him notified a Deputy Marshal named Ed Short. He arrested Bryant and took him on a train to be committed to the jail at Wichita, Kansas without a guard or notifying Marshal Grimes at Fort Smith. After the train left Hennessey and was approaching the stop at Waukomis, Oklahoma, Short noticed a group of mounted men that looked as if they were trying to beat the train and feared it was the Dalton Gang coming to free Bryant. Short put the baggage man in charge of Bryant giving him his revolver while he went to the rear platform with his rifle. The baggageman carelessly stuck the revolver into a Pigeon-hole messagebox and went to work at the other end of the car. Bryant secured the revolver and ordered the baggageman to go back to work. He opened the door to the rear platform and, while Short had his attention to the mounted men, shot him in the back. Short turned and they both shot each other to death.

The second train robbery by the Dalton Gang in Oklahoma was at a small station called Lelietta on September 15, 1891, about four miles north of Wagoner, Oklahoma. Here they secured $19,000, which Bob spent mostly on women and gambling. Bill Doolin complained that he was not dividing the money fairly and quit the gang along with Newcomb and Pierce. Grat returned to Oklahoma in the spring of 1892. The three dissatisfied members also returned and new plans began to formulate. Bill had also returned several months earlier living at his mothers near Kingsfisher. Even though he did not participate in any of the hold ups with his brothers he acted as a spy and advisor.

On June 1, 1892, the gang robbed the Santa Fe train at Red Rock, Oklahoma securing about $50,000. Here the Santa Fe had found out about the Daltons plans and attempted to set up a trap for the gang filling the train with heavily armed officers. However they made the mistake of leaving the train dark which made Bob suspicious and the gang allowed the train to go by robbing the next train a few minutes later. The $50,000 however came out to only $1800 after draft and securities had been thrown out. It was soon necessary to rob another train.

The next robbery was at Adair, Oklahoma, near the Arkansas border on July 14. At the station the gang took what they could find in the express and baggage rooms. They sat to wait for the next train on a bench on the platform, talking and smoking, with their Winchester rifles across their knees. When the train came in at 9:45 p.m., they backed a wagon up to the express car and unloaded all the contents. The eight armed guards on the train all happened to be at the back of the train when it pulled in. They fired at the bandits through the car windows and from behind the train. In the gun fight, 200 shots were fired. None of the Dalton gang was hit. Doctors W. L. Goff and Youngblood were sitting on the porch of the drug store near the depot. Both men were hit several times by stray shots; Dr Goff was fatally wounded. Also wounded were captains Kinney and LaFlore, but they recovered. The gang secured about $18,000. They were also accused of robbing a bank in El Reno, Oklahoma on July 28, however this was based on little evidence as no one saw any members of the gang.

== Downfall of the gang ==
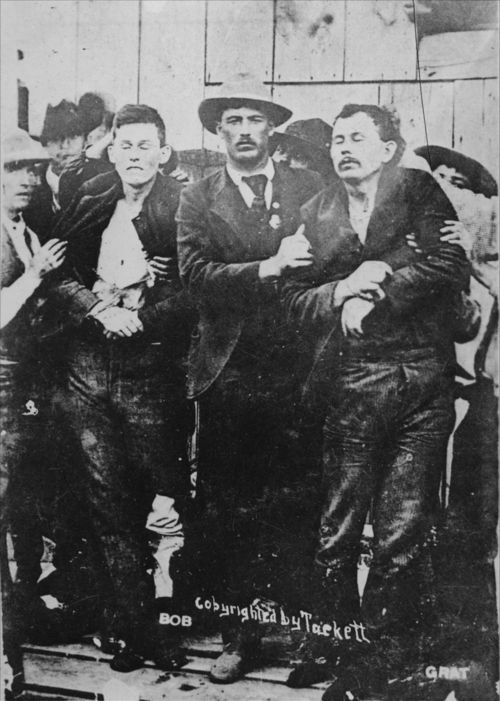
Law enforcement officers hold up the bodies of Bob and Grat Dalton after the attempted Bank Robbery in Coffeyville, Kansas

By that time, by later accounts from Emmett Dalton, Deputy US Marshal Heck Thomas was on the trail of the Dalton Gang. His relentless pursuit had pushed them to make one large score, then lie low for a time. Grat Dalton thought Coffeyville would be an excellent opportunity for that score. For reasons unknown, Grat Dalton dismissed gang members "Bittercreek" Newcomb and Charley Pierce, telling them their services were no longer needed. It would prove to be a blessing in disguise for Pierce and Newcomb.

The robbery attempts would be a colossal mistake. On October 5, 1892, the gang entered Coffeyville, simply riding in, then splitting into two teams. The brothers were recognized as soon as they rode into town. They entered the two banks in two separate teams, intent on having only so much time to finish the robberies and flee. By the time they were ready to make their escape, the townspeople had armed themselves and set up to cover all escape routes from the town. A fierce shootout erupted, and by the time it was over, gang members Grat Dalton, Bob Dalton, Dick Broadwell, alias "Texas Jack" Moore, and Bill Power, alias Joseph Evans, were dead, and Emmett Dalton had been shot 23 times, but would survive. Four townspeople, Town Marshal Charles T. Connelly, bank clerk Lucius M. Baldwin, cobbler Charles J. Brown, and merchant George W. Cubine were dead. Bank cashier Thomas G. Ayers was shot in the groin; although seriously wounded, he survived, while townspeople T.A. Reynolds and Louis Dietz were wounded, but not seriously.

The gun-battle ended the Dalton Gang. However, the legend of the gang and the notoriety they received due to the Coffeyville shootout made them famous. That fame helped drive their brother Bill Dalton in efforts to become more famous than his brothers, and helped spawn the Doolin Dalton Gang, with Bill Dalton, Bill Doolin, "Bittercreek" Newcomb, and Charley Pierce all having their start with the Dalton Gang.

== In popular culture ==
The western actor Gregg Palmer, then twenty-five, portrayed Gratton Dalton in the 1952 film The Cimarron Kid. Thereafter, in 1954, Fess Parker played Grat in an episode of Jim Davis's syndicated series Stories of the Century.

Jim Davis portrayed Grat Dalton in the 1963 episode "Three Minutes to Eternity" of the syndicated western series, Death Valley Days.

In 1975 Grat Dalton was played by the actor Richard Jaeckel in the TV movie western The Last Day.
