= Evett Dumas Nix =

United States Marshal (1861–1946)

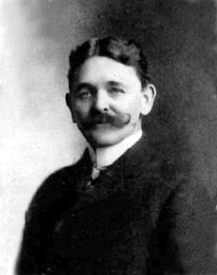

U.S. Marshal for Oklahoma Territory
- In office August 22, 1893 – February 18, 1896
- Preceded by: William C. Grimes
- Succeeded by: Patrick S. Nagle

Personal details
- Born: Evitte Dumas Nix; September 19, 1861 Kentucky
- Died: February 4, 1946 (aged 84) Riverside, California
- Resting place: Oak Grove Cemetery; 37.08690°N 88.62000°W
- Spouse: Ellen Felts
- Parents: Simpson Socrates Nix; Rebecca Elizabeth Holland Nix
- Occupation: United States Marshal, storekeeper, electric franchisor, financial broker, film actor and producer

Evett Dumas Nix, often known as E. D. Nix, (September 19, 1861 – February 6, 1946) was a United States Marshal in the late 19th century handling the jurisdiction that included the wild Oklahoma Territory, later to be the state of Oklahoma. He was first appointed in 1893, in the closing years of the Old West, during the last years of the Isaac C. "Hanging Judge" Parker tenure.

== Biography ==
Born in Kentucky, his uncle was a County Sheriff, and his father a Deputy Sheriff. He went into business, working in sales, operating a grocery store and a hardware store. In 1885 he married childhood girlfriend Ellen Felts. Nix first came to Oklahoma Territory during the Land Run of 1891 and was a Guthrie, Oklahoma businessman with many influential friends, to include rancher Oscar Halsell. Halsell had, for a time, employed Bill Doolin and other members of the Doolin-Dalton Gang a.k.a The Wild Bunch, and who was involved in the 1884 Hunnewell Gunfight.

=== Law enforcement career ===
Nix took over as Oklahoma Territory's U.S. Marshal in a very volatile and dangerous time. The Doolin-Dalton Gang was in full swing, committing bank robberies and train robberies in not only Oklahoma Territory but also Texas and Arkansas. The outlaws had a haven in Ingalls, Oklahoma and U.S. Marshal Nix wasted no time in moving to bring the gang down. His first course of action was to organize a posse to take down the outlaws in Ingalls. With Deputy U.S. Marshal John Hixon in the lead, Nix dispatched a posse of fourteen Deputy U.S. Marshals to Ingalls to affect the arrests. On September 1, 1893, in what would become known as the Battle of Ingalls, three of his Deputy U.S. Marshals, Deputy Marshal Thomas Hueston, Deputy Marshal Richard Speed, and Deputy Marshal Lafayette Shadley were killed in the ensuing gun battle. Outlaws "Bittercreek" Newcomb, Charley Pierce and "Dynamite Dick" Clifton were wounded, but escaped. Outlaw "Arkansas Tom Jones" was stunned and captured after dynamite was thrown at him by Deputy U.S. Marshal Jim Masterson. A saloon owner known only as Murray was shot and badly wounded by the U.S. Marshals when he began shooting at the lawmen in defense of the outlaw fugitives.

Following this tragic event, to topple the gang, Nix organized a special elite group of one-hundred Deputy U.S. Marshals, including iconic lawmen Heck Thomas, Bill Tilghman and Chris Madsen, who became known as the Three Guardsmen. U.S. Marshal Nix was staunchly defensive of his Deputies, and the actions they were forced to take in order to bring the gang to justice. With Nix in support of them, the Deputy U.S. Marshals began to whittle away at the gang, and by 1898 the entire Doolin-Dalton Gang had been wiped out with the exception of "Arkansas Tom Jones", who was in prison. After his release he returned to breaking the law and was killed by lawmen.

Two years after the Battle of Ingalls, saloon owner Murray was seeking civil damages for having been shot by the Deputy U.S. Marshals. U.S. Marshal Nix stood in defense of his deputies and addressed the Attorney General Judson Harmon directly on the matter, stating in part; "Murray and other citizens catered to their (Doolin-Dalton Gang) trade, carried them news of the movements of Deputy (U.S.) Marshals, furnished them with ammunition, cared for their horses, permitted them to eat at their tables and sleep in their beds". Nix continued "This man Murray came to the front door of the saloon either just before the outlaws left the building or just after, it is not known which. However, when he first appeared in the doorway, he had the door open just a short distance and had his Winchester (rifle) to his shoulder in the act of firing". The U.S. Marshal then added that "Three of the Deputies seeing him in the position he was in, fired on him simultaneously. Two of the shots struck him and one broke his arm in two places." The letter is now housed in the National Archives.

=== Later life and death ===
Nix was dismissed from his position as U.S Marshal after an audit in 1896 after critics accused him of misusing government funds. Many now believe that he was merely the victim of the fee system used at the time for payment of Deputy U.S. Marshals and that he actually did not mismanage any funds. He returned to his life as a successful businessman in Guthrie following his dismissal. In 1929, Nix co-authored a book titled Oklahombres: Particularly The Wilder Ones with Gordon Hines, detailing much of the work that went into bringing the Doolin-Dalton Gang to justice. In addition, Oklahombres detailed the hunting down of many other outlaws and fugitives, including the Jennings Gang. His book also documents his youth in Kentucky and reflects on the changes that had taken place from the 1890s to the 1920s in the way of the outlaws and the lawmen.

== See also ==
- List of Old West lawmen
