= Battle of Ingalls =

US Marshal v D Daltons

Date	September 1, 1893
Location	Ingalls, Oklahoma, United States 36°6′7″N 96°52′54″W
Result	Doolin-Dalton gang flees Ingalls

Belligerents
U.S. Marshals	Doolin-Dalton Gang

Commanders and leaders
John Hixon	Bill Doolin Bill Dalton

Strength
13-14	10

Casualties and losses
3 killed	3 Wounded; 1 Stunned and Captured
- Civilian casualties: 1 killed 2 wounded
- Location within Oklahoma

The Battle of Ingalls was a gunfight on September 1, 1893, between United States Marshals and the Doolin-Dalton Gang, during the closing years of the Old West era, in Ingalls, Oklahoma Territory, Oklahoma. The Doolin-Dalton Gang had been involved in a number of train robberies and bank robberies, beginning around 1891. They had found a safe haven in the town of Ingalls, which unwittingly harbored many outlaws during that period. On September 1, 1893, a posse was organized by the new Oklahoma Territory U.S. Marshal Evett Dumas "E.D." Nix, which entered the outlaw town of Ingalls with the intent to capture the outlaw, fugitive gang. The lawmen engaged in a protracted gun battle with the gang. Three of the fourteen lawmen carrying Deputy U.S. Marshals' commissions died as a result of the battle.

== Battle ==
The gun battle began when the Deputy U.S. Marshals, led by Deputy Marshal John Hixon, engaged "Bittercreek" Newcomb, which resulted in a shootout exchange that left Newcomb badly wounded after firing, at most, two rounds. By a first-hand account given later by U.S. Marshal Nix, a large number of the outlaws then opened fire from a saloon, resulting in the lawmen returning fire, killing one horse. The Deputy Marshals' gunfire forced the outlaws to flee out a side door of the saloon, taking refuge in a large stable. A civilian known only as Murray, who owned the saloon, then engaged the Marshals in a shootout from his saloon's front doorway, during which the Marshals shot him in the ribs and arm. Murray was badly wounded and arrested. He pursued civil damages against the government two years later, but lost his case largely because U.S. Marshal Nix staunchly defended his Deputy Marshals' actions.

From an extremely good and elevated angle on the top floor of the Pierce O.K. Hotel, "Arkansas Tom Jones" then opened fire with a rifle. Having tactical advantage over the Deputy Marshals, he was able to push them into points of cover, during which he shot Deputy Marshal Thomas Hueston. Hueston would die the next day. It had been Deputy Marshal Hueston who, on November 29, 1892, along with Ford County, Kansas Sheriff Chalkey Beeson had shot and killed Doolin Dalton gang member Oliver Yantis. Ingalls bystander Young Simmons was fatally shot by a stray round as he attempted to take cover inside Vaughn's Saloon. Another bystander, known as Old Man Ransom, was hit in the leg.

Bill Doolin, the co-leader of the gang, shot and killed Special Deputy Marshal Richard Speed, while co-leader Bill Dalton shot Deputy Marshal Lafayette Shadley, who died the following day. Shadley had fired on Dalton prior to being shot himself, breaking the leg of the outlaw's horse and toppling Dalton to the ground. Dan "Dynamite Dick" Clifton was then hit in the neck and wounded, but still able to ride. Deputy Marshal Jim Masterson eventually threw dynamite into where "Arkansas Tom" Jones was hiding, stunning him, after which he was captured.

Of the outlaws, "Bittercreek" Newcomb was seriously wounded but escaped, "Dynamite Dick" Clifton was slightly wounded but escaped and "Arkansas Tom" Jones, who had shot at least one of the Deputies and one citizen, was stunned by the dynamite and captured. The saloon owner, Murray, who had taken up arms and sided with the outlaws, survived, spent some time in prison and later sued the U.S. Marshals over his being shot. The rest of the gang escaped unscathed. Gang member Charley Pierce, who escaped, was later said to have been wounded during that gunfight, and was known for a fact to have gone into hiding with Newcomb shortly after the gun battle, at which time both men were cared for by Newcomb's girlfriend Rose Dunn.

Eventually, the gang was wiped out, some by capture, but most being killed by Deputy U.S. Marshals. Most were brought down by the celebrated Three Guardsmen; Deputy Marshals Heck Thomas, Bill Tilghman and Chris Madsen. Two of the gang, "Bitter Creek" Newcomb and Charley Pierce, were killed by the Dunn Brothers, who were bounty hunters. The last of the gang to fall were Richard "Little Dick" West, killed in 1898 by Deputy Marshal Madsen, and Roy Daugherty, killed in a shootout with Joplin, Missouri Police on August 16, 1924.
