= Jennings Gang =

The Jennings Gang (c. 1897) was a gang of outlaws in the closing days of the Old West, notable in that one member was a former Wild Bunch gang member, Richard "Little Dick" West, and the leader of the gang, Al Jennings, ran for Oklahoma Governor in 1914.

The gang originated in Oklahoma, following the downfall of the Wild Bunch at the hands of three Deputy US Marshals, Heck Thomas, Bill Tilghman, and Chris Madsen. Following the killing of outlaw and Wild Bunch leader Bill Doolin, by Heck Thomas in 1896, "Little Dick" West joined up with Al and Frank Jennings, and Morris and Pat O'Malley, to form what would be known as the Jennings Gang. However, the gang was less than successful. They conducted a series of failed train robbery attempts, one of their last being a case where they blew up an entire train car, only to find that there was no money in the train's safe. Another time, they robbed a general store, receiving only $15 for their troubles. Less than a year after they were formed, they broke up. Al and Frank Jennings, as well as both O'Malley brothers, were captured and sentenced to prison. "Little Dick" West eluded capture until later in 1898, when he was killed by Deputy US Marshal Madsen, in Oklahoma. In 1914 Al Jennings ran for Oklahoma Governor, but was soundly defeated.
