= Little Britches (outlaw) =

American outlaw (born 1879)

Jennie Stevens, or Little Britches
- Born: 1879; Barton County, Missouri, US
- Died: Unknown
- Occupation: American outlaw
- Spouses: Benjamin Midkiff (divorced) Robert Stephens (divorced): Possible third husband unknown
- Parent(s): Daniel and Lucy Stevenson

Jennie Stevenson (born 1879), known as Little Britches, was an outlaw in the American Old West associated with Cattle Annie. Their exploits are fictionalized in the 1981 film Cattle Annie and Little Britches, directed by Lamont Johnson and starring Diane Lane as Little Britches.

== Background ==
Born Jennie Stevens in Barton County in southwestern Missouri, to a farm couple, Daniel and Lucy Stevenson, her one known sister was Victoria Estella Stevenson. Apparently, she dropped the "son" from her maiden name; her second husband was apparently named "Stephens", not "Stevens". For a time, then, she was Jennie Stevenson Stephens. The Stevenson family lived during part of the 1880s in Seneca in Newton County, also in southwestern Missouri on the eastern border of Oklahoma, then Indian Territory. The Stevensons then moved into the Creek Nation at Sinnett in Pawnee County in the northern Indian Territory. Little Britches followed stories of the Bill Doolin gang written by such dime novelists as Ned Buntline, like her friend Cattle Annie (born Anna Emmaline McDoulet).

== Enchantment with crime ==
Little Britches joined the Doolin-Dalton gang, but lost her horse and returned home to the stern rebuke of her father. She was determined nevertheless to pursue a life of crime, and she married a deaf-mute horse dealer, Benjamin Midkiff, in March 1895. They established housekeeping in a hotel in Perry in Noble County in northern Oklahoma. Midkiff found her unfaithful, however, and he returned the teenager to her father after the two had been together for only six weeks. Within a day of returning home, she began riding along the Arkansas River in search of outlaw adventure.

Soon, she apparently married Robert Stephens, but the union lasted only six months. At a community dance, Jennie and Annie met the Doolin gang, later called the Wild Bunch (not the Butch Cassidy gang of the same name). These outlaws, all 11 of whom met violent deaths, maintained a hideaway in the Creek Nation Cave, located on the Cimarron River in Payne County near Ingalls east of Stillwater, Oklahoma. At a shootout in Ingalls in 1893, three marshals were killed.

Little Britches and Cattle Annie were excellent horse riders and sharpshooters who dressed in men's clothing. The two women evaded law enforcement and became known for their daring pursuits throughout the region. They sold whiskey to the Osage and Pawnee tribes and engaged in horse theft, operating either together or alone. They alerted other outlaws about the location of law enforcement officers.

In mid-August 1895, Little Britches was captured, but she soon escaped from a restaurant in Pawnee, Oklahoma Territory, while she was in the custody of Sheriff Frank Lake. Journalist accounts maintain that she left through the back door of the establishment despite the presence of a guard. She tore off her dress, grabbed the horse of a deputy marshal, and galloped away into the night. U.S. Marshals Bill Tilghman and his deputy Steve Burke quickly tracked down Annie and Little Britches. Burke caught Cattle Annie as she was climbing from a window, but Tilghman had more difficulty apprehending Little Britches, who fired a Winchester rifle at both lawmen. Tilghman then shot Little Britches' horse. As the animal fell to the ground, Little Britches was taken into custody and jailed, but only after she had tried to shoot Tilghman with a pistol and then to attack him physically.

== Alternate reports ==
The Oklahoma Journal of History and Culture contends that Tilghman likely had nothing to do with the apprehension of Little Britches. Newspapers credited both captures to Lake, Burke, and Frank Canton, another deputy marshal. The publication further contends that neither girl had been involved with the Doolins or any other outlaw gang.

== Imprisonment ==
The two young women were tried for horse theft and the sale of alcohol to the Indians before U.S. District Judge Andrew Gregg Curtin Bierer Sr. (1862–1951) at his court in Guthrie in Logan County, capital of the Oklahoma Territory. Little Britches was incarcerated for two months in the Guthrie jail (under the name Jennie Midkiff, from her first husband of six weeks) as a material witness in a murder trial. She had witnessed a shooting while working as a domestic. Little Britches' two-year prison sentence for horse theft and selling whiskey to the Indians began in 1895 at the Massachusetts Correctional Institution in Framingham. She was released in October 1896, under terms of good behavior, and returned to her parents. Her final years are unknown, though some stories circulated that she married for a third time, reared a family, and led an exemplary life thereafter in Tulsa. Her time and place of death are unknown.

Cattle Annie received a one-year sentence and was also sent to Framingham in 1895. Because of poor health, she was paroled, but remained in Framingham for some time.

== In popular culture ==
=== In film ===
In the film Cattle Annie and Little Britches (1981), directed by Lamont Johnson, Diane Lane portrays Little Britches, Amanda Plummer makes her film debut as Cattle Annie, Burt Lancaster is an historically inaccurate and much older Bill Doolin, Rod Steiger is Marshal Tilghman, Scott Glenn is Bill Dalton, and Buck Taylor (known as the young gunsmith-turned-part-time-deputy and apprentice medical doctor on CBS's Gunsmoke) plays Dynamite Dick, a fictionalized character conflating elements of several real people. Bill Doolin was shot to death at the age of 38 by Marshal Heck Thomas; Lancaster was 67 when he played Doolin in the film.

=== In print ===
Novelist Robert Ward, a native of Baltimore, Maryland, wrote Cattle Annie and Little Britches (1977), his personal interpretation of the romantic legends of the Doolin-Dalton gang.

=== In television ===
Actress Gloria Winters (of the Sky King aviation adventure television series) portrayed Little Britches in a 1954 episode of the syndicated Stories of the Century, a western anthology series starring and narrated by Jim Davis. In this story, Little Britches became smitten with an outlaw named Dave Ridley, played by James Best, rather than Bill Doolin. Little Britches is shown at the conclusion of the episode leaving the Framingham reformatory and anonymously working in a soup kitchen in a slum section of New York City. In the 1962 episode "Girl with a Gun", on the anthology series, Death Valley Days, Anne Helm filled the title role of Jennie Metcalf, with Ken Mayer as Marshal Hobe Martin.

== Other uses of Little Britches ==
"Little Britches" is used across the United States as the proper name of numerous business, including day-care centers, pediatric clinics, clothing stores, bakeries, boutiques, and even an employment agency for nannies. Nor should Little Britches the outlaw be confused with:

- The childhood autobiography by Ralph Moody entitled, Little Britches: Father and I Were Ranchers (1991), the story of a boy growing up on a ranch near Littleton, Colorado.
- The National Little Britches Rodeo Association, which bills itself as the "oldest, continuing junior rodeo association in the nation," directed toward the interests of western-minded youth. The National Little Britches Rodeo Finals are held annually in late July at the Colorado State Fair in Pueblo.
