= Cattle Annie and Little Britches =

1981 film by Lamont Johnson

- Directed by: Lamont Johnson
- Written by: David Eyre; Robert Ward
- Based on: Cattle Annie and Little Britches by Robert Ward
- Produced by: Rupert Hitzig; Alan King
- Starring: Burt Lancaster; John Savage; Rod Steiger; Diane Lane; Amanda Plummer; Scott Glenn; Buck Taylor
- Cinematography: Larry Pizer
- Edited by: William Haugse
- Music by: Sahn Berti; Tom Slocum
- Production company: Hemdale Film Corporation
- Distributed by: Universal Pictures
- Release date: April 24, 1981
- Running time: 98 minutes
- Country: United States
- Language: English
- Box office: $534,816

Cattle Annie and Little Britches is a 1981 American Western film, starring Burt Lancaster, John Savage, Rod Steiger, Diane Lane, and Amanda Plummer, based on the lives of two adolescent girls in late 19th-century Oklahoma Territory, who became infatuated with the Western outlaws they had read about in Ned Buntline's stories, and left their homes to join the criminals. It was scripted by David Eyre and Robert Ward from Ward's book, and directed by Lamont Johnson.

== Plot ==
The outlaws the girls find are the demoralized remnants of the "Doolin-Dalton gang", a.k.a. The Wild Bunch, led by a historically, inaccurately aged Bill Doolin. Anna Emmaline McDoulet, or Cattle Annie, shames and inspires the men to become what she had imagined them to be. The younger sister (but historically not a relative) Jennie Stevens or Little Britches (Diane Lane) finds a father figure in Doolin, who in the story line coined her nickname "Little Britches". Doolin's efforts to live up to the girls' vision of him lead him to be carted off in a cage to an Oklahoma jail, where he waits to be hanged. With the help of the girls and the gang, Doolin escapes and rides off to safety with his men. The girls are triumphant, but they cannot escape Deputy U.S. Marshal Bill Tilghman and are sent back east to the reformatory in Framingham, Massachusetts.

== Cast ==
- Scott Glenn as Bill Dalton
- Redmond Gleeson as Red Buck
- William Russ as Little Bill Raidler
- Ken Call as George Weightman
- John Savage as Bittercreek Newcomb
- Buck Taylor as Dynamite Dick
- Michael Conrad as engineer
- Amanda Plummer as Cattle Annie
- Diane Lane as Jennie (Little Britches)
- Burt Lancaster as Bill Doolin
- Chad Hastings as Conductor
- John Quade as Morgan
- Yvette Sweetman as Mrs. Sweetman
- Perry Lang as Elrod
- Rod Steiger as Deputy U.S. Marshal Bill Tilghman
- Steven Ford as Unnamed Deputy U.S. Marshal
- Roger Cudney Jr. as Capps

== Production ==
During production, Lancaster collapsed from a bile duct blockage. According to his daughter, Joanna, who was on set, they returned to Los Angeles and an ambulance met them at the airport. It was 105 °F (41 °C) in temperature, and the ambulance broke down on the way to the hospital. "He got out and pushed," she recalled. "I couldn't get him to behave."

== Reception ==
The film was favorably reviewed by the critic Pauline Kael in The New Yorker. "The cinematography [by Larry Pizer] is vivid … the colors are strikingly crisp and intense. The dialogue and most of the incidents have a neat, dry humor. It's a wonderful, partly true story … there are some wonderful performances. As Bill Doolin, Lancaster (who made the film before Atlantic City) is a gent surrounded by louts — a charmer. When he talks to his gang, he uses the lithe movements and the rhythmic, courtly delivery that his Crimson Pirate had when he told his boys to gather round. In his scenes with Diane Lane, the child actor who appeared in New York in several of Andrei Șerban's stage productions, and who single-handedly made the film A Little Romance almost worth seeing, Lancaster has an easy tenderness that is never overdone. Lancaster looks happy in the movie and still looks tough; it's an unbeatable combination. Young Amanda Plummer gives a scarily brilliant performance".

Variety called it "as cutesy and unmemorable as its title". The review criticizes the distanced visual style of director Lamont Johnson, and that as a result, "the film washes over the viewer, with no images or moments sticking in the mind." Tom Hutchinson of the Radio Times gave the film 3 out of 5 stars. Matt Brunson of Film Frenzy reviewed the film in 2020, and rated it 2.5 out of 4. He wrote: "The film has been hailed in some quarters as a buried treasure, yet while it bears a certain measure of charm, it isn't quite as accomplished as its reputation might suggest."

== Home video ==
Cattle Annie and Little Britches was released for the first time on DVD and Blu-ray by KL Studio Classics on April 14, 2020.
