= Bill Tilghman =

American West lawman (1854–1924)

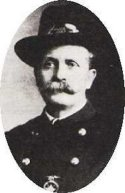
- Tilghman in 1912
- Born: July 4, 1854; Fort Dodge, Iowa, US
- Died: November 1, 1924 (aged 70); Cromwell, Oklahoma, US
- Cause of death: Gunshot wounds
- Resting place: Oak Park Cemetery in Chandler, Oklahoma; 35.700278°N 96.904444°W
- Occupations: Buffalo hunter, saloon owner, Deputy U.S. Marshal, Oklahoma state senator, Oklahoma City police chief, film director and actor
- Years active: 1869–1924
- Known for: Apprehension of Bill Doolin; Member of the Three Guardsmen of Oklahoma; Oklahoma state senator; Police chief in Oklahoma City; Marshal in Cromwell, Oklahoma; Producing and starring in the film The Passing of the Oklahoma Outlaws
- Political party: Democratic
- Spouses: Flora F. Kendall (m. 1877; her death 1900); Zoe Agnes Stratton (m. 1903)
- Children: Charles, Dorothy, William, Vonia, Tench, Richard and Woodrow Tilghman

William Matthew Tilghman Jr. (July 4, 1854 – November 1, 1924) was a career lawman, gunfighter, and politician in Kansas and Oklahoma during the late 19th century. Tilghman was a Dodge City, Kansas City Marshal in the early 1880s and played a role in the Kansas County Seat Wars. In 1889 he moved to Oklahoma Territory where he acquired several properties during a series of land rushes. While serving as a Deputy U.S. Marshal in Indian Territory and Oklahoma Territory, he gained recognition for capturing the notorious outlaw fugitive Bill Doolin and helping to track and kill the other members of the Doolin-Dalton gang, a.k.a. The Wild Bunch, which made him famous as one of Oklahoma's "Three Guardsmen".

Tilghman never achieved the household-word status of his close friends Wyatt Earp and Bat Masterson but, nevertheless remains a well-known figure of the American Old West. His memoirs were made into a 1915 film called The Bank Robbers that he directed and starred in as himself.

Tilghman died in 1924 at the age of 70 after being shot by a corrupt Prohibition Agent on the streets of Cromwell, Oklahoma. Much of the fame that he has since achieved has been attributed to the efforts of his second wife, who published his biography in 1949. In 1960, he was inducted into the Hall of Great Westerners of the National Cowboy & Western Heritage Museum.

== Early life ==
William Matthew Tilghman Jr. was born on July 4, 1854, in Fort Dodge, Iowa. He was the third of six children born to William Matthew Tilghman Sr. (1820–1908) and his wife Amanda Shepherd (1830–1915).

In 1857, the Tilghman family relocated to the newly created Kansas Territory and settled on a farm near Atchison. At the age of seventeen, Bill Tilghman won a contract to supply buffalo meat to the men building the Atchison, Topeka and Santa Fe Railroad. From September 1, 1871, to April 1, 1872, Tilghman is reputed to have killed 3,300 buffalo. He would claim this was the "all time record" in later years. According to Zoe Tilghman, his second wife, he also killed two Cheyenne braves when they confronted him, as he feared they would torture him.

== Dodge City ==
According to his second wife, Tilghman first became a lawman in September 1874, when he signed on as a Deputy under County Sheriff Charles E. Bassett (1847–1896) of Ford County, Kansas. Despite this claim, there is no record of Tilghman serving as Bassett's Deputy. Sometime during the summer of 1877, the 23-year-old Tilghman married (Note: The exact date is unknown, since no wedding certificate has been found.) a 16-year-old widow named Flora (Kendall) Jefferson (1861–1900). (Note: Flora F. Kendall was born in Doniphan, Kansas on May 26, 1861. She married John Jefferson (1851–1877) on April 5, 1877. He died shortly after the wedding from an unknown cause.) The marriage was an unhappy one almost from the start, but nonetheless produced four children: Charles, (Note: Charles Augustus Tilghman was born on November 22, 1878. He married Ione Conklin (1884–1973), with whom he had two children. He died on March 13, 1972, at the age of 93.) Dorothy, (Note: Dorothy "Dot" Tilghman was born on May 22, 1881. She married Daniel J. Norton, with whom she had three children. She died on October 20, 1973, at the age of 92.) William, (Note: William Tilghman was born on April 3, 1886, in Dodge City. He died on July 29, 1952, at the age of 66.) and Viona. (Note: Viona "Vonie" Tilghman was born on December 14, 1890. She married Frederick Lee Sikes (1888–1967), with whom she had a daughter. She died on July 7, 1927, at the age of 36.)

Early in 1877, Tilghman and Henry Garris opened the Crystal Palace Saloon in Dodge City, Kansas. A local paper reported during the summer that "Garris and Tilghman's Crystal Palace is receiving a new front and an awning, which will tend to create a new attraction towards the never ceasing fountains of refreshment flowing within." Barely a year later, during the spring of 1878, Tilghman and Garris sold the Crystal Palace Saloon.

Bill Tilghman's first documented service as a lawman began on January 1, 1878, when he became a Deputy Sheriff under Sheriff Bat Masterson. Within a month of his appointment, Tilghman was charged with being an accessory to an attempted train robbery. On February 12, the charges against him were dropped for lack of evidence. Tilghman was again suspected of a crime two months later, on April 16, when he was arrested by Masterson on a charge of horse theft. Once again the charges were dismissed. Troubles of a different sort came up on March 8, 1879, when Masterson had to sell his Deputy's Dodge City house at auction, apparently to satisfy a civil judgment.

=== City Marshal ===
On November 6, 1883, Patrick F. Sughrue (1844–1906) was elected Sheriff of Ford County and Bill Tilghman became his Deputy. During this period, Tilghman also owned a Dodge City saloon called the Oasis, which he sold to his brother Frank in early April 1884. According to a local paper, "William Tilghman, Esq, proprietor of the 'Oasis,' has sold out to his brother Frank, who will refit and fix up and make everything smooth and harmonious to the visitor."

Tilghman gained his first important position as a lawman on April 10, 1884, when he was appointed City Marshal of Dodge City. On May 2, 1884, the citizens of Dodge presented Tilghman with a solid gold badge. In her biography of her husband, Tilghman's widow wrote that Tilghman and Assistant Marshal Ben Daniels ran "Mysterious" Dave Mather out of Dodge during late July 1885. Mather's 1992 biographer said the story does not add up for many reasons. The most obvious is that Mather was scheduled to stand trial for murder at the time, which raises the question of why Dodge City's Marshal and Assistant Marshal would run out an indicted man rather than confine him. On March 9, 1886, Tilghman resigned as City Marshal to tend to his ranch. The great blizzard of 1886 wiped out the livestock on many ranches in the area, including a ranch that Tilghman owned.

Even after resigning as City Marshal, Tilghman still held a commission as a Ford County Deputy Sheriff. Law enforcement duties brought him to Farmer City, Kansas on his thirty-fourth birthday, July 4, 1888, where he shot and killed a man named Ed Prather. The local paper reported that Prather "made frequent threats against Wm. Tilghman, the Deputy Sheriff, who took all the abuse from the excited man without offering any retaliation ... in conversation with Mr. Tilghman, he became very abusive and threatened to put an end to him right there, and suiting action to his words, he threw his hand upon his revolver; but Mr. Tilghman was too quick for him and held a revolver in his face. Mr. T. ordered him three times to take his hand off his gun, and would have disarmed him if he had been near enough; but Prather sought a better position, but Tilghman pulled the trigger and Prather was a dead man. A coroner's jury ... after a thorough examination of the circumstances, returned a verdict of justifiable killing."

=== Gray County War ===
In January 1889, Bill Tilghman was one of several Dodge City gunfighters involved in the Gray County War, a county seat war fought between the rival Kansas towns of Ingalls and Cimarron. During a pitched battle between the two factions, one man was killed and five were wounded. Tilghman escaped with nothing more serious than a sprained ankle.

== Oklahoma ==
On April 22, 1889, the first of the celebrated Oklahoma land rushes took place. The city of Guthrie, which had not existed the day before, had an instant population of 15,000. One member of that population was Bill Tilghman, who built a commercial structure on his Oklahoma Avenue lot and used the rent from it to help re-establish himself as a rancher. For the remaining thirty-five years of his life, Tilghman was an Oklahoman. Another land rush was held on September 22, 1891, and Tilghman established a ranch. During this period, Oklahoma was suffering from the depredations of numerous outlaws, most notably Bill Doolin and his gang, the Wild Bunch. In May 1892, Tilghman was appointed a Deputy U.S. Marshal in Oklahoma. He joined forces with fellow deputy marshals such as Heck Thomas, Chris Madsen, Frank Canton, and Bud Ledbetter to wage total war on the outlaws active in the territory.

In the Cherokee Strip land rush of September 16, 1893, the new town of Perry, Oklahoma was created, and Bill Tilghman was appointed city marshal of Perry on October 21. Heck Thomas was hired as assistant marshal. Both Tilghman and Thomas retained their commissions as deputy U.S. marshals. Once law and order was established in Perry, Tilghman went back on the trail of the Doolin gang.

A famous but completely fictitious story tells of how Tilghman entered a "dugout" on January 8, 1895. Tilghman supposedly detected the tips of several rifles pointed at him from hidden positions in the dugout. According to this story, one of the hidden outlaws attempted to shoot Tilghman in the back, but was prevented from doing so by Bill Doolin himself, who stated: "Bill Tilghman is too good a man to shoot in the back." This much-repeated tale has its origin in a 1915 pamphlet which was sold in conjunction with Tilghman's motion picture The Passing of the Oklahoma Outlaws. In 1937, Chris Madsen, Tilghman's fellow marshal, commented on the yarn as follows: "I like Bill Tilghman ... but Bill, when he got into the moving picture business, had to make a record whether it was right or not ... Bill was a little inclined to be romantic."

Slowly but surely, the Doolin gang was all but exterminated. Chris Madsen's posse killed "Tulsa Jack" Blake on April 4, 1895; George "Bitter Creek" Newcomb and Charley Pierce were killed on May 2. Then on September 6, 1895, Tilghman and two other deputy marshals tracked down William F. "Little Bill" Raidler. After being ordered to surrender, Raidler opened fire and was brought down by a blast from Tilghman's shotgun. The outlaw survived his wounds and was sentenced to ten years.

=== Capture of Bill Doolin ===
The high point of Tilghman's career came on January 15, 1896, when he single-handedly captured Bill Doolin, the putative leader of the Wild Bunch. Tilghman trailed Doolin to the health resort in Eureka Springs, Arkansas. Entering a bathhouse, he spotted Doolin seated in the lobby, though Doolin failed to recognize Tilghman, who suddenly began wrestling with the outlaw. After a brief struggle, Tilghman subdued Doolin without a shot being fired. Once Doolin was in custody, Tilghman wired U.S. Marshal Evett Dumas Nix in Guthrie, Oklahoma: "I have him. We will be there tomorrow. Tilghman." The following day, some 2,000 people jammed the Guthrie railroad station to see Tilghman bring in Doolin.

The remainder of the Doolin gang was soon killed or captured. A posse killed George "Red Buck" Waightman on March 4, 1896, and "Dynamite Dick" Clifton was rounded up shortly afterward. Tilghman's glory for capturing Bill Doolin quickly evaporated when Doolin escaped from jail on July 5, less than six months after his capture. Doolin was finally tracked down by Heck Thomas and his posse and was shot to death on August 24, 1896. Tilghman never received the reward money for Doolin's capture, which the state of Oklahoma refused to pay after Doolin escaped.

The last two members of the Doolin gang were accounted for when "Dynamite Dick" Clifton was killed on November 7, 1897, followed by the death of "Little Dick" West on April 8, 1898. (Note: West had been cornered by a posse consisting of Tilghman, Heck Thomas, Albert Thomas (Heck's son), Ben Miller, Frank Rinehart and William D. Fossett. When ordered to surrender, West fired three shots from his revolver. Both Rinehart and Fossett returned fire. A coroner's jury ruled that West came to his death "at the hands of officer Fossett while resisting arrest.") Following the demise of the Wild Bunch, Tilghman, Heck Thomas, and Chris Madsen became known collectively as the "Three Guardsmen" of Oklahoma.

== Later years ==
In 1899, Tilghman established the Oakland Stock Farm, which bred thoroughbred horses. Bill traveled to Kentucky for two of his studs. One of them was Chant, the winner of the 1894 Kentucky Derby. Prosperous and popular, Tilghman easily won election as sheriff of Lincoln County, Oklahoma in 1900. He was re-elected two years later. Flora Kendall Tilghman died at the age of 39 on October 12, 1900. Bill and Flora Tilghman had had an unhappy marriage and were living apart at the time of her death. Contrary to latter-day reports, there is no evidence that they were divorced at the time.

On July 15, 1903, the 49-year-old Tilghman married for a second time. The bride, Zoe Agnes Stratton (1880–1964), was 26 years younger and a graduate of the University of Oklahoma. Bill and Zoe Tilghman had three sons named Tench, (Note: Mayo Tench Tilghman was born on September 26, 1905. He married Doris Roselyn Tucker (1910–1992) on July 15, 1939. They had one daughter. He died on August 13, 1970, at the age of 64.) Richard, (Note: Richard Lloyd "Dick" Tilghman was born on September 20, 1907, and died at the age of 22 on October 28, 1929. He had attempted to hold up a dice game, and suffered a fatal wound when he was shot through the liver.) and Woodrow. (Note: Woodrow Wilson "Woodie" Tilghman was born on October 23, 1912. He was a career criminal who spent most of his life behind bars. He was shot and wounded in Oklahoma City during a fight with his girlfriend. He died on March 1, 1981, at the age of 68.)

=== Politician ===
The 19th Democratic National Convention was held in St. Louis between July 6 and 9, 1904. Alton Brooks Parker (1852–1926) received the nomination for president. Tilghman was part of the Oklahoma delegation, and was part of a group of Democrats who journeyed to Parker's home to inform him of his nomination. While in New York, Tilghman looked up his old friend Bat Masterson, who was now a journalist working for the New York Morning Telegraph. Masterson introduced Tilghman to President Theodore Roosevelt, who defeated Alton Brooks Parker in the 1904 election. Tilghman's being a Democrat probably accounted for his failure to receive the appointment from Roosevelt that he coveted above all others – U.S. Marshal of Oklahoma. Roosevelt had offered the position to Masterson, who turned it down. For a while Roosevelt also considered Chris Madsen (who had served with the Rough Riders), but the appointment finally went to someone else. Tilghman was never in the running. President Roosevelt remained fond of Tilghman, however, and invited him to be his special guest at the inauguration of William Howard Taft as president on March 4, 1909. With his powerful political connections, Tilghman easily won election as an Oklahoma state senator in 1910. Following his term in the senate, Tilghman became chief of police in Oklahoma City on May 8, 1911. He served two years and helped rid Oklahoma City of much of its criminal element.

=== Movie star ===
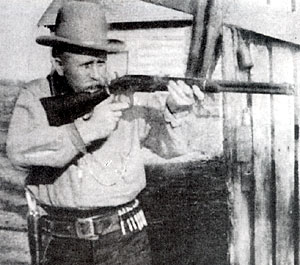
Bill Tilghman posing with his Winchester rifle in a scene from the 1915 film The Passing of the Oklahoma Outlaws

Instead of writing his memoirs, Tilghman recounted his Oklahoma adventures in cinematic form. In 1908 he filmed the silent short film The Bank Robbery. On January 18, 1915, Tilghman, Evett Dumas Nix, and Chris Madsen formed the Eagle Film Company. Nix had the title of president, Tilghman was vice-president and treasurer, and Chris Madsen was designated as secretary. After a screenwriter, cameraman, and cast were hired, filming began on The Passing of the Oklahoma Outlaws. Tilghman produced with Nix and Madsen, directed with Kent, wrote with Lute P. Stover, and starred in the film as himself. Nix, Madsen, and Roy Daugherty also appeared as themselves. The film had its premier in Chandler, Oklahoma, on May 25, 1915. Tilghman took the film on the road for several years, during which he appeared on stage and gave lectures. The Passing of the Oklahoma Outlaws originally ran for about 96 minutes. (Note: Surviving posters and newspaper advertising for the film describe it as being "Complete in Six Parts" – meaning it contained six reels. With the hand-cranked cameras of the silent movie era, a reel of film usually ran for about 16 minutes, meaning that the six reels of Passing of the Oklahoma Outlaws probably ran about 96 minutes.) Today, only thirteen minutes of the film survive. (Note: The 35mm negative of the surviving 13 minutes has been preserved by the Library of Congress (AFI/Claire Conrad Collection), with video tinting approximating the original print colors.) Academic Frank Richard Prassel called the film "a major source of popular disinformation", as it features staged scenes purported by the filmmakers to be real.

=== Death ===
In 1924, at the age of 70, Tilghman entered Cromwell, Oklahoma, as a special investigator. He had previously clashed there with a corrupt U.S. prohibition agent, Wiley Lynn, and confronted him on October 31 when he heard that Lynn was drunkenly discharging his gun. Tilghman attempted to take Lynn into custody without using his own pistol, and, with the help of a bystander, disarmed Lynn. However, Lynn pulled a second pistol and shot Tilghman several times; Tilghman died the following day. In a controversial trial, Lynn was acquitted of murder after pleading self-defense. Lynn was later shot and killed in a gunfight in 1932.

Governor Martin E. Trapp (1877–1951) directed that Tilghman's body lie in state in the rotunda of the Oklahoma capitol building and be attended by an honor guard. Tilghman's pall bearers included Governor Trapp, former Governor J.B.A. Robertson, Oklahoma Attorney General George Short, and U.S. Marshal Alva McDonald. Tilghman was the third person ever and first police officer to have received such honors. He was buried in Chandler, Oklahoma. A park in the town is named for him.

== Film and television portrayals ==
In 1956, actor Donald "Don" Kennedy (b. 1920) played "Deputy Bill Tillman" in an episode called "Dodge City Gets a New Marshal" on the syndicated television series The Life and Legend of Wyatt Earp.

On February 13, 1960, actor Brad Johnson played Tilghman in an episode called "The Wedding Dress" on the syndicated television series Death Valley Days (season 8, episode 18). Actress Mary Webster was cast as Mrs. Tilghman. Bill Tilghman's widow, Mrs. Zoe Tilghman, 84 years old, a surprise guest on the TV program, was interviewed by The "Old Ranger", actor Stanley Andrews.

In 1981, Tilghman was portrayed by Rod Steiger (1925–2002) in Cattle Annie and Little Britches, a 97-minute film which also starred Burt Lancaster (1913–1994) as Bill Doolin.

On August 22, 1999, TNT broadcast the made-for-television film You Know My Name, which starred Sam Elliott (b. 1944) as Bill Tilghman, Carolyn McCormick (b. 1959) as Zoe Tilghman, and Arliss Howard (b. 1954) as Wiley Lynn. The film was a highly fictionalized account of Tilghman's final months and death.

In 2019, Tilghman was portrayed by Ken Arnold in a movie entitled "The Marshall" (original title: Bill Tilghman and the Outlaws), also starring Robert Carradine as Frank James and Johnny Crawford as William S. Hart.

== Homestead ==
The Marshall William M. Tilghman Homestead, 2 miles northwest of Chandler off the former US Route 66, is on the National Register of Historic Places listings in Lincoln County, Oklahoma.

== See also ==
- List of Old West lawmen
