= The Cimarron Kid =

1952 film by Budd Boetticher

- 2014 UK DVD cover
- Directed by: Budd Boetticher
- Screenplay by: Louis Stevens
- Story by: Louis Stevens; Kay Lenard
- Produced by: Ted Richmond
- Starring: Audie Murphy; Beverly Tyler; Yvette Duguay
- Cinematography: Charles P. Boyle
- Edited by: Frank Gross
- Color process: Technicolor
- Production company: Universal Pictures
- Distributed by: Universal Pictures
- Release date: December 24, 1951 (Boston)
- Running time: 84 minutes
- Country: United States
- Language: English
- Box office: $1.25 million (U.S. rentals)

The Cimarron Kid is a 1952 American Western film directed by Budd Boetticher and starring Audie Murphy, Beverly Tyler and Yvette Duguay. It was produced and distributed by Universal Pictures.

== Plot ==
Bill Doolin is released from jail and is traveling home on the train when it is robbed by his boyhood friends, the Dalton Gang. Doolin is later accused of helping the crime and becomes an outlaw. He rides to the hideout of the Dalton gang, who want him to join. They are planning to rob two banks in Coffeyville simultaneously, and Doolin agrees to accompany them.

Doolin enters one of the banks with two of the gang members while Bob Dalton enters the other bank. The robberies are botched and most of the six gang members are killed in a gunfight. Only Bill and Bitter Creek escape to the hideaway. A manhunt ensues for the remaining gang members, who meet at Pat Roberts' place. Red Buck wants to return to Coffeyville to try to rob the banks again, but Bill and the rest of the gang members refuse. Sam Swanson and Marshal Sutton arrive at Roberts' house and Sutton searches the barn.

Carrie Roberts tells Bill that he is headed toward death on a dark road. She tells him that she and her father often visit Boonsville and that she may see him there.

The gang continues to rob banks. Rose gathers information in Boonsville and passes it to Bitter. Carrie arrives and greets Bill, followed by two agents. Pat arrives and covers for them to trick the agents into thinking that they have the wrong man.

The gang hides at Stacey's home, but they fall into a trap and are surrounded by the law. However, they escape via the entrance to the trains. Bill is shot but not fatally. Carrie and Stacey arrive, and Carrie and Bill are left alone. Carrie tells Bill to cross the border, but he refuses.

Dynamite, who survived an earlier fall into the water, returns and describes a $100,000 gold shipment that they can steal. Bill wants to talk to George Weber, who had informed Dynamite about the delivery, and Dynamite brings George to the hideout. They send Rose to Dallas to verify George's story. She talks with some people who know George, and they confirm that he works for the railroad.

Bill and Dynamite board the train with the gold aboard. They throw the gold from the train and Bitter grabs it, but he is killed by the law. As the train approaches the next dropoff point, they drop the gold. Will Dalton approaches it and is killed.

Rose sends a telegram to George informing him that Bitter Creek was killed. He tries to hide the telegram, but Bill reads it and realizes that they have been betrayed by Dynamite and George. Dynamite shoots George, aiming for Bill, and Bill wounds Dynamite and forces him to collect the gold at the next stop. Dynamite is killed and Bill escapes.

Bill returns for Carrie to ask her to cross the border with him. Pat objects, concerned for Carrie's safety. At the barn, the marshal is waiting and arrests Bill. Pat advises him to serve his time and that Carrie will be there for him. Bill leaves with the marshal after embracing Carrie. Rose tells her that she is lucky that Bill is still alive.

== Cast ==
- Audie Murphy as Bill Doolin / The Cimarron Kid
- Beverly Tyler as Carrie Roberts
- James Best as Bitter Creek Dalton
- Yvette Duguay as Rose
- John Hudson as Dynamite Dick Dalton
- Hugh O'Brian as Red Buck
- Roy Roberts as Pat Roberts
- David Bauer as Sam Swanson (as David Wolfe)
- Noah Beery Jr. as Bob Dalton
- Leif Erickson as Marshal John Sutton
- John Hubbard as George Weber
- Frank Silvera as Stacey Marshall
- William Reynolds as Will Dalton
- Gregg Palmer as Grat Dalton

== Production ==
The film is based on a story by Louis Stevens. The project was assigned to producer Ted Richmond at Universal Pictures as a vehicle for Audie Murphy in April 1951.

The Cimarron Kid is the first Western film directed by Budd Boetticher, who later became famous for his work in the genre. He later said, "I became a Western director because they thought I looked like one and they thought I rode better than anyone else. And I didn't know anything about the West." It was also Boetticher's first film in color and his first under a long-term contract with Universal Pictures.

In the original script, Bill Doolin dies at the end of the film, but the studio changed the ending it to reflect Murphy's rising popularity.

The railroad scenes were filmed on the Sierra Railroad in Tuolumne County, California.

== Release ==
The film's world premiere was held in Boston on December 24, 1951.

== See also ==
- List of American films of 1952
