= Hunnewell gunfight =

1884 gunfight in Kansas, United States

The Hunnewell gunfight (August 21, 1884) was an Old West gunfight occurring in Hunnewell, Kansas on August 21, 1884. The gunfight involved no known gunmen.

== History ==
=== Background ===
Before the shootout, Hunnewell, Kansas was a town frequented by cowboys working on the local ranches and corrals. At the time, Hunnewell was a prosperous cattle town, serving as a shipping point for Texas cattle. The Leavenworth, Lawrence and Galveston Railroad provided quick access to the Kansas City, Kansas stockyards, and in the towns heyday it had one hotel, two general stores, one barber shop, two dance halls, and eight saloons, including Hanley’s Saloon (where the gunfight took place). With little more than railroad workers and cowboys, violence was common. There were no lawmen to speak of during the 1880s in or around that area, and typically cattle rustling and other crimes were dealt with by the ranchers themselves.

=== Shootout ===
On August 21, 1884, cowboys Oscar Halsell and Clem Barfoot entered Hanley's Saloon and quickly became drunk, causing a disturbance in the saloon. Soon after, two Kansas lawmen entered also, and although only passing through, they attempted to quiet the disturbance. This developed into an argument, which quickly resulted in several people drawing pistols. Who shot first is not known, but is believed that Clem Barfoot actually fired the first round. Several shots followed, resulting in Barfoot being killed and Deputy Sheriff Ed Scotten mortally wounded.

No one was ever prosecuted, and although publicized at the time, the gunfight was soon forgotten. Oscar Halsell would go on to be a prosperous rancher, later employing such notable outlaws as Bill Doolin and George "Bitter Creek" Newcomb. Halsell was also close friends to later U.S. Marshal Evett D. Nix.
