= Frank Dalton =

Leader of Doolin-Dalton Gang, associate to Dalton Gang

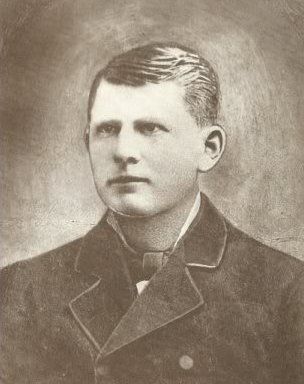
- Born: June 8, 1859; Westport, Missouri, United States
- Died: November 27, 1888 (aged 29); Oklahoma, United States
- Relatives: Lewis Dalton, Adeline Younger
- Police career
- Allegiance: Deputy US Marshal Oklahoma Territory

John Franklin Dalton (June 8, 1860 – November 27, 1888) was a Deputy US Marshal of the Old West under Judge Isaac C. Parker (the hangin' judge), for Oklahoma Territory, as well as the older brother to the members of the Dalton Gang, in addition to being the brother to William M. Dalton, once a member of the California legislature, and later an outlaw and leader of the Doolin Dalton gang alongside Bill Doolin. Frank Dalton is not to be confused with J. Frank Dalton (1848–1951), who made many claims to be famous people, including his claim of being Frank Dalton, and later Jesse James.

Dalton was commissioned as a Deputy US Marshal, serving under Judge Parker, and quickly developed a reputation as being a brave lawman. Based out of Fort Smith, Arkansas, Dalton was involved in a number of shootouts and high risk arrests over a three-year period. However, on November 27, 1887, he and Deputy J. R. Cole were on the trail of outlaw Dave Smith, wanted for horse theft. As they approached Smith's camp, Smith fired a shot from a rifle, hitting Dalton in the chest. Deputy Cole returned fire, killing Smith, but was then shot and wounded by a Smith cohort. Cole was able to make his escape believing Dalton was dead. Dalton, however, was still alive, and engaged the outlaws in a short gunbattle. One of Smith's cohorts was wounded, and a woman who was in the camp was killed during the crossfire. Frank Dalton was shot and killed near the Arkansas River by the time Deputy Cole returned with a posse, having been killed with two additional rifle shots by outlaw Will Towerly. The outlaw wounded by Dalton never revealed his own name. He died shortly thereafter, but not before naming Towerly as Frank Dalton's murderer. A newspaper of the time indicated Dalton had begged Towerly not to kill him, saying he was already dying. However, that was a rumour, and there were no witnesses to the crime who ever made that statement. Towerly was killed six days later by Deputy William Moody and Deputy US Marshal Ed Stokley. Stokley was also killed during the gunfight. Dalton was buried in Elmwood Cemetery in Coffeyville, Kansas, not far from the graves of his two outlaw brothers, Grat and Bob. (One can see the graves of Bob, and Grat just to the left of Frank's grave about 30 yards (27 m) back with the original hitching post that they tied their horses to)

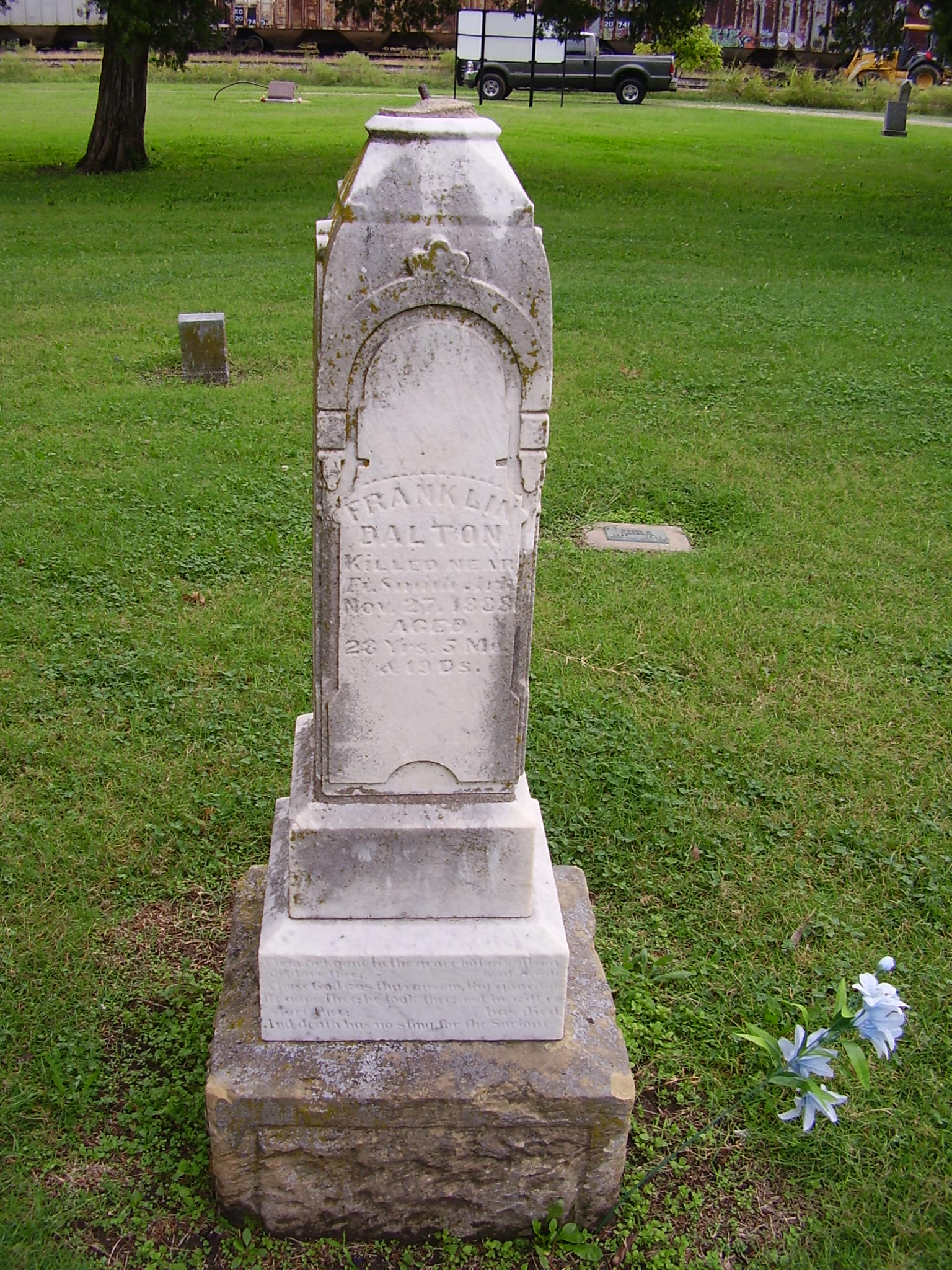
Frank Dalton's grave in Coffeyville, Kansas

The actor Robert Lansing played Frank Dalton in the NBC television series Outlaws in a two-part episode "The Daltons Must Die", which aired early in 1961.

Don Collier was cast as Frank Dalton in the 1964 Death Valley Days episode, "There Was Another Dalton Brother". In the story line, while starting his job as a deputy U.S. Marshal, Dalton must question Frank Johnson (Bill Zuckert), a suspect in a missing persons case. Johnson is the father of Dalton's girlfriend, Emmy (Laura Shelton). Strother Martin was cast in this episode as Charlie Neel and Robert Anderson (1920–1996) as Marshal Heck Thomas.
