= Oliver Yantis =

American outlaw (1869–1892)

Oliver Yantis, known as Oliver "Ol" Yantis (1869—November 30, 1892) was an American outlaw of the Old West, best known for being a member of the Doolin Dalton Gang.

Yantis was born in Kentucky, and worked as a cotton farmer near what was then Orland, Oklahoma Territory until he met outlaws Bill Doolin and George "Bittercreek" Newcomb. Yantis joined Doolin's gang in 1892, which Doolin had formed and co-led with Bill Dalton. It is believed that he first met Newcomb, who at the time, was involved romantically with Yantis' sister.

Yantis was with the gang when they committed bank robberies in Caney, Indian Territory on October 14, and Spearville, Kansas on November 1, both in 1892. The gang quickly became one of the most pursued gangs in Old West history, with several members having a bounty of $5,000 on them for their capture or death. Ford County, Kansas Sheriff Chalkley Beeson and Deputy US Marshal Tom Hueston trailed Yantis to the McGinn farm near Dodge City, but he had already left. On November 29, 1892, they trailed him to his sister's home outside of Orlando. The two lawmen announced themselves and demanded his surrender. Yantis walked out, and as he acted as if he was putting his hands up, he drew a revolver and fired on the officers, who both returned fire, hitting Yantis in the leg and stomach. The lawmen nursed his wounds, and took him to a hotel in Orlando, where he died that next day.

Yantis became the first of the Doolin Dalton gang members to fall, thus he is less known than his fellow gang members. He was buried in Logan County, Oklahoma, in the Roselawn Cemetery. Deputy US Marshal Hueston would later be killed during another shootout with gang members in Ingalls, Oklahoma, in the infamous Battle of Ingalls.
