= Three Guardsmen =

Group of American Old West lawmen

The Three Guardsmen is the name popularized in Old West literature describing three lawmen who became legendary in their pursuit of many outlaws of the late 19th century. Deputy U.S. Marshals Bill Tilghman (1854–1924), Chris Madsen (1851–1944) and Heck Thomas (1850–1912) were "The Three Guardsmen," working under U.S. Marshal Evett "E.D." Nix.

== Career and notoriety ==
Beginning in 1889, they began "cleaning up" the Indian Territory and Oklahoma Territory, part of what became the State of Oklahoma in 1907. Widely considered honest, dutiful and capable, they were responsible for suppressing much of the outlaw element in the Territories and environs, reportedly arresting in excess of some 300 desperadoes and fugitives during the next decade while killing several others in the line of duty. All three had the reputation of being dauntless in their pursuit, ignoring bad weather, and each was known for their unique tracking abilities. Heck Thomas' relentless pursuit of the Dalton Gang was specifically mentioned by gang member Emmett Dalton as one reason the Dalton Gang attempted to rob two banks simultaneously in Coffeyville, Kansas; to make one big score so that they could leave the Territory for a time. Resistance from the lawmen and citizens of Coffeyville to this robbery ended the gang with the deaths of most of its members.

They are most famous for their relentless pursuit of the Wild Bunch, a.k.a. Doolin-Dalton Gang, which included surviving members of the Dalton Gang. The three lawmen eliminated many of the Doolin Gang by systematically killing gang members who resisted them and arresting those who would surrender. Deputy Marshal Heck Thomas killed gang leader Bill Doolin. Deputy Marshal Chris Madsen led the posse that killed Doolin gang members "Dynamite Dan" Clifton and Richard "Little Dick" West. Deputy Marshal Tilghman was ultimately responsible for the death of Doolin gang member William F. "Little Bill" Raidler. Other gang members were also captured or killed by them.

== Later years ==
Heck Thomas retired in 1905, and in 1907 accepted a Chief of Police position in Lawton, Oklahoma. He died in 1912 of Bright's disease.

Bill Tilghman retired in 1910 and was elected to the Oklahoma State Senate. On Halloween night, 1924, and at the age of 70, Tilghman was murdered by a corrupt U.S. Bureau of Prohibition Agent named Wiley Lynn, while serving as Town Marshal for Cromwell, Oklahoma. Cromwell at the time was a wild town full of brothels, pool halls and saloons. One month after his death, the entire town was burned to the ground with no building was left standing. Chris Madsen and other former law enforcement friends of Tilghman were believed to have been responsible, but no investigation into the arsons was ever conducted. The town of Cromwell never recovered; as of the 2000 census, its population was less than 300.

Madsen had retired in 1905 and died in 1944 at the age of 93.

== Etymology of "The Three Guardsmen" ==
Although the trio of Tilghman, Thomas, and Madsen have been known by this nickname for more than a century, the popular understanding of the nickname's origins appears to be apocryphal in origin. Modern histories of territorial Oklahoma often claimed outlaws pursued by the lawmen applied the nickname "The Three Guardsmen." Unfortunately, no period reference to a criminal's use of the term has been found.

Prior to a newspaper article written in 1911, it appears the term "The Three Guardsmen" had never been used in print to refer to the three lawmen. Grant Richardson, an advertising representative for the St. Louis Post-Dispatch, wrote an article based on a subject suggested by "Mrs. Heck Thomas of Lawton, Oklahoma." The story is identified by the paper as one of several winners in the Heroism category of a "Real Life Contest" run by the paper. In this article, Richardson made reference to "The Three Guardsmen" and identified them as Thomas, Bill Tilghman, and Chris Madsen.

The initial use of the term in English predated this news article by more than a half century. Following the 1844 publication of Les Trois Mousquetaires by Alexandre Dumas, English translations were produced. The first known mention of an English translation in the United States, The Three Guardsmen, was in 1845. In addition to edits of the content, the title was anglicized.

This English title, The Three Guardsmen, saw use in publication through much of the 19th century in book form as well as for stage performances. The term entered the general parlance as a reference for three men or corporations fighting for a united purpose. By 1911, it had been used multiple times in newspapers, never referencing these lawmen from Indian Territory and Oklahoma Territory.
