= William Blake (outlaw) =

American outlaw (1859–1895)

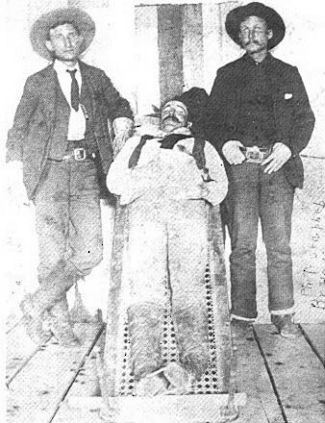
- Deputy US Marshals William Banks (left) and Isaac S. Prater (right) killed William "Tulsa Jack" Blake (center) near Dover, Oklahoma Territory, 1895
- Born: William Blake c. 1859
- Died: April 4, 1895 (aged 35–36); Major County, Oklahoma
- Cause of death: Gunshot wound
- Other name: Tulsa Jack
- Criminal charges: Bank robbery, train robbery

William "Tulsa Jack" Blake (c. 1859 - April 4, 1895) was an American outlaw of the Old West, and member of the Wild Bunch gang. He had been a cowboy in Kansas through the 1880s, before drifting into Oklahoma Territory, where in 1892 he met outlaw Bill Doolin, and joined Doolin's Wild Bunch gang, sometimes called the Oklahombres, or the Doolin-Dalton Gang.

== Background ==
On the night of April 3, 1895 this gang decided to rob a southbound Rock Island train. The five of them stormed the train and ordered it to be opened. When messenger J.W. Jones refused they fired 20 rounds into the car. Jones didn't give up his hold until random bullets got him in the wrist and leg. By orders of the conductor, who was worried they would kill the passengers, he let the bandits in the train.

They stormed on with guns drawn ready to kill anyone who got in their way. "Tulsa Jack" and "Red Buck" were put in charge of patrolling the passenger cars while the others watched the safe in the front of the train. Tulsa and Red pushed the train porter to pick up an empty grain sack and pillage the passengers of their wallets, watches, and jewelry. "Tulsa Jack" had a gun to his back and "Red Buck" walked behind to make sure they were covered. They made off with $400 in cash, and some other goods and rode off into the night.

They were on the run for most of the night, just slipping away from the law. By the next afternoon, they had been spotted by William Banks and six other men. Not bothering to hide on their path home, "Tulsa Jack" and the others of the gang were taking a break with their horses. When the law tried to call out to them "Tulsa" fired a shot in their direction.

== Final years and death ==
He took part in numerous bank robberies and train robberies, and was a key figure during the gang's shootout with US Marshals in Ingalls, Oklahoma in September 1893, during which three Deputy Marshals were killed. On April 4, 1895, Blake was tracked to a hideout in Major County, Oklahoma, by a posse led by Deputy Marshal William Bartling Murrill. During a fierce gun-battle that lasted over 45 minutes, Blake at first held the Marshals off. However, as he broke cover to flee, he was shot and killed by Deputy Marshal William Bartling Murrill. His death marked the beginning of the downfall of the Wild Bunch Gang.
