= Orlando, Oklahoma =

- Town
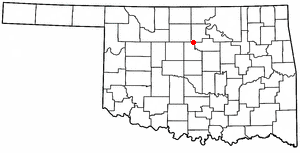
- Location of Orlando, Oklahoma
- Coordinates: 36°8′54″N 97°22′39″W
- Country: United States
- State: Oklahoma
- Counties: Logan, Payne

Area
  - Total: 0.39 sq mi (1.01 km^{2})
  - Land: 0.39 sq mi (1.01 km^{2})
  - Water: 0 sq mi (0.00 km^{2})
- Elevation: 1,089 ft (332 m)

Population (2020)
  - Total: 130
  - Density: 331.8/sq mi (128.12/km^{2})
- Time zone: UTC-6 (Central (CST))
  - Summer (DST): UTC-5 (CDT)
- ZIP code: 73073
- Area code: 580
- FIPS code: 40-56050
- GNIS feature ID: 2413091

Orlando is a town in Logan and Payne counties in the U.S. state of Oklahoma. As of the 2020 census, Orlando had a population of 130. It is part of the Oklahoma City metropolitan area.

== History ==
Before the opening of the Cherokee Outlet for settlement, this community was called Cherokee, but the name was changed to Orlando, when a post office was opened on July 18, 1889.

Early Orlando had a colorful history. In 1892, Oliver Yantis, a member of the Doolin Gang, was wounded and captured outside of the town. He was brought into Orlando, where he died. In 1896, a group of con artists bought some homesteads near the town, salted them with gold nuggets and started a gold rush. Several townspeople lost a great deal of money before the plot was exposed. In 1902, a woman who had bought adulterated kerosene for the lamps in her house. The impure material exploded when she lit the lamps, starting a fire that killed her, two children and spread to several nearby houses.

A 1927 tornado killed two people and destroyed several houses. Construction of Lake Carl Blackwell in the 1930s forced about 100 families that had regularly traded in Orlando to move away.

Passenger train service through Orlando ceased after World War II ended, and construction of I-35 caused the town to lose most of its commercial highway traffic after 1964.

== Geography ==
Orlando is 21 miles (34 km) north of Guthrie, the county seat, 1 mile (1.6 km) west of the Payne County line, and 1 mile (1.6 km) south of the Noble County line.

According to the United States Census Bureau, the town has a total area of 0.2 square miles (0.52 km^{2}), all land.

== Demographics ==
Historical population
| Census | Pop. | Note | %± |
|---|---|---|---|
| 1900 | 300 | | — |
| 1910 | 340 | | 13.3% |
| 1920 | 161 | | −52.6% |
| 1930 | 226 | | 40.4% |
| 1940 | 332 | | 46.9% |
| 1950 | 262 | | −21.1% |
| 1960 | 194 | | −26.0% |
| 1970 | 202 | | 4.1% |
| 1980 | 218 | | 7.9% |
| 1990 | 198 | | −9.2% |
| 2000 | 201 | | 1.5% |
| 2010 | 148 | | −26.4% |
| 2020 | 130 | | −12.2% |
U.S. Decennial Census

=== 2020 census ===
As of the 2020 census, Orlando had a population of 130. The median age was 39.0 years. 28.5% of residents were under the age of 18 and 14.6% of residents were 65 years of age or older. For every 100 females there were 97.0 males, and for every 100 females age 18 and over there were 93.8 males age 18 and over.

0.0% of residents lived in urban areas, while 100.0% lived in rural areas.

There were 55 households in Orlando, of which 38.2% had children under the age of 18 living in them. Of all households, 47.3% were married-couple households, 14.5% were households with a male householder and no spouse or partner present, and 27.3% were households with a female householder and no spouse or partner present. About 11.0% of all households were made up of individuals and 3.6% had someone living alone who was 65 years of age or older.

There were 68 housing units, of which 19.1% were vacant. The homeowner vacancy rate was 0.0% and the rental vacancy rate was 0.0%.

Racial composition as of the 2020 census
| Race | Number | Percent |
|---|---|---|
| White | 97 | 74.6% |
| Black or African American | 0 | 0.0% |
| American Indian and Alaska Native | 6 | 4.6% |
| Asian | 1 | 0.8% |
| Native Hawaiian and Other Pacific Islander | 0 | 0.0% |
| Some other race | 7 | 5.4% |
| Two or more races | 19 | 14.6% |
| Hispanic or Latino (of any race) | 14 | 10.8% |

=== 2000 census ===
At the 2000 census there were 201 people, 74 households, and 52 families in the town. The population density was 942.5 inhabitants per square mile (363.9/km^{2}). There were 88 housing units at an average density of 412.6 per square mile (159.3/km^{2}). The racial makeup of the town was 86.07% White, 9.95% Native American, 1.00% Asian, and 2.99% from two or more races.

Of the 74 households 33.8% had children under the age of 18 living with them, 51.4% were married couples living together, 10.8% had a female householder with no husband present, and 29.7% were non-families. 25.7% of households were one person and 12.2% were one person aged 65 or older. The average household size was 2.72 and the average family size was 3.29.

The age distribution was 29.9% under the age of 18, 11.9% from 18 to 24, 24.4% from 25 to 44, 22.4% from 45 to 64, and 11.4% 65 or older. The median age was 32 years. For every 100 females, there were 105.1 males. For every 100 females age 18 and over, there were 98.6 males.

The median household income was $28,929 and the median family income was $35,625. Males had a median income of $30,000 versus $27,500 for females. The per capita income for the town was $12,826. About 18.0% of families and 17.8% of the population were below the poverty line, including 15.4% of those under the age of eighteen and 14.3% of those sixty five or over.
