= The Bank Robbery =

1908 film

- Date: 28 December 1908
- Duration: 19 minutes
- Location: Cache, Oklahoma, USA
- Type: silent motion picture
- Filmed by: Bill Tilghman

The Bank Robbery is a short silent motion picture filmed by American lawman Bill Tilghman in Cache, Oklahoma. The film is unique due to the use of actual lawmen and robbers portraying the characters.

== Cast ==
- Al J. Jennings
- Frank Canton
- Quanah Parker
- Heck Thomas
- William Tilghman
