= Roy Daugherty =

American outlaw

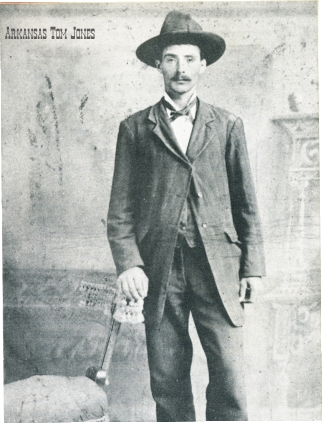
- Born: January 1, 1870; Missouri
- Died: August 16, 1924 (aged 54); Joplin, Missouri
- Cause of death: Gunshot wound
- Other names: Arkansas Tom Jones
- Occupation: outlaw
- Known for: member of the Wild Bunch gang

Roy Daugherty, also known as Arkansas Tom Jones, (1870 – August 16, 1924) was an American outlaw of the Old West, and a member of the Wild Bunch gang, led by Bill Doolin. He was the longest-lived, as well as the last surviving member of the gang.

Born into a staunchly religious family in Missouri, his two brothers became preachers. However, Daugherty rebelled and left Missouri for Oklahoma Territory at only 14 years of age. He called himself "Arkansas Tom Jones", claiming to have been from there. For several years, he worked as a cowboy, which was how he met Bill Doolin. He joined Doolin's gang around 1892. He was involved in several robberies, but was one of the first of the gang to fall, being captured after the Battle of Ingalls, in Ingalls, Oklahoma on September 1, 1893. He killed Deputy Marshal Thomas Hueston during that shootout, and was captured after Deputy Marshal Jim Masterson threw dynamite into where Jones was making his stand, stunning him. Deputy Marshal Hueston, whom Jones killed, along with Ford County, Kansas Sheriff Chalkey Beeson had killed Wild Bunch gang member Oliver Yantis the year before.

Daugherty was sentenced to fifty years in prison, but due to his two preacher brothers campaigning on his behalf, he was paroled in 1910. For two years he ran a restaurant in Drumright, Oklahoma, but became bored and moved to Hollywood, California, hoping to act in western films. However, that did not work out, and he committed a bank robbery in 1917 in Neosho, Missouri, and was again captured. Released in 1921, he robbed another bank in Asbury, Missouri that same year. He remained on the run from law enforcement until tracked to Joplin, Missouri and killed during a gunfight by Joplin Police Detective Leonard H. "Len" Vandeventer on August 16, 1924.

== See also ==
- The Passing of the Oklahoma Outlaws
