= Pooleville, Oklahoma =

Unincorporated community in Oklahoma, US

- Unincorporated community
- Location within the state of Oklahoma Pooleville (the United States)
- Coordinates: 34°25′10″N 97°23′59″W
- Country: United States
- State: Oklahoma
- County: Carter
- Time zone: UTC-6 (Central (CST))
  - Summer (DST): UTC-5 (CDT)
- ZIP codes: 73401
- GNIS feature ID: 1100756

Pooleville is a community located in Carter County, Oklahoma, United States. It is west of the Arbuckles. During the territorial days, the community was originally known as Elk.

At the time of its founding, the community was located in Pickens County, Chickasaw Nation.

The Elk post office opened January 15, 1890, and the name was changed to Pooleville on July 20, 1907. The current ZIP Code is 73401 assigned to Ardmore. The community was named for an Ardmore banker, E.S. Poole.

In 1907, when Oklahoma became a state, it was decided that Elk should be renamed because the mail kept getting mixed up with Elk City, and so a town meeting was called. Three possible names were chosen and sent to Washington, DC: JJ Eaves, a prominent rancher, LO Majors, the owner of the General Store, and Elzy R Poole, a pioneer rancher. After a time, Washington DC notified them that Elk, Oklahoma would now be called Pooleville. E.S. Poole was actually Edward Poole and was the son of Elzy R. Poole, in 1907 he was only 19 years old and so it is doubtful that he would be a prominent banker at that time.

On June 8, 1894, a sheriff's posse from Anadarko caught and killed William M. Dalton (a brother of the Daltons and member of the Doolin-Dalton Gang) near here.
