= George Waightman =

American outlaw (c. 1850 – 1895)

George "Red Buck" Weightman (c. 1850 – October 2, 1895, Oklahoma) was an American Old West outlaw, and member of the Doolin-Dalton gang. His surname was also spelled Waightman (albeit incorrectly).

Weightman was born in Tennessee, 1850. He is known to have been a cowboy prior to meeting Bill Doolin and Bill Dalton in 1892. He joined their gang shortly thereafter, taking part in numerous bank robberies and train robberies over the next three years. By 1894, however, US Marshals were hot on the gang's trail, and several members had been captured or killed. The gang split up to make things more difficult for the Marshals. Weightman was eventually tracked down, on October 2, by local lawmen Holcomb and Ventioner, and in the ensuing shootout Weightman was killed.
