= Clarkson, Oklahoma =

Ghost Town in Oklahoma, United States

Coordinates: 36°00′24″N 97°15′52″W

Clarkson was a small community located north of the Cimarron River in Payne County, Oklahoma Territory. Founded by Dunkers (Church of the Brethren), the post office opened January 31, 1890, with Grant T. Johnson as the postmaster. The post office closed February 28, 1903. On January 3, 1894, members of the Doolin Gang held up the community store and post office taking supplies, tobacco, cash, and registered mail. The only remaining trace of the community is the cemetery.

== See also ==
- List of ghost towns in Oklahoma

== Bibliography ==
- Foreman, Grant. "Early Post Offices". Chronicles of Oklahoma. 6:2 (June 1928) 155–162. (accessed March 16, 2007)
- Shirk, George H. Oklahoma Place Names. Norman: University of Oklahoma Press, 1987. ISBN 0-8061-2028-2 .
- Shirley, Glenn. Gunfight at Ingalls: Death of an Outlaw Town. Stillwater, Oklahoma: Barbed Wire Press, 1990. ISBN 0-935269-06-1
