= Bill Raidler =

Outlaw of the American Old West (1895 – 1909/10)

William F. "Billie" Raidler, known as "Little Bill" Raidler (1865 – 1910) was an American outlaw of the Old West, and member of the Doolin-Dalton gang.

Raidler was born William F. Readler in Pennsylvania in January 1865 and raised to be an educated man having attended college for awhile. Family name is spelled Readler in Pennsylvania. However he had an adventurous side, and drifted down to Texas where he became a cowboy, then eventually ventured up to Oklahoma Territory, where he met Bill Doolin while working for Oscar Halsell on the HH Ranch. He joined Doolin's gang around 1894. He was involved in several bank robberies and train robberies, as well as a number of shootouts with lawmen. On September 6, 1895, Raidler was trailed to a hideout in Oklahoma by Deputy US Marshal Bill Tilghman. Raidler engaged Tilghman and his two deputies in a gunbattle and was shot in the wrist by Tilghman. As he attempted to flee, Tilghman shot him two more times, once in the back and once in the neck. Raidler survived and was sentenced to ten years in prison. In prison he befriended William (Bill) Sydney Porter, later to become O. Henry. They were friends until their deaths, which were only a few months apart. He was released in ill health in 1902, suffering greatly from his gunshot wounds that never completely healed and caused him to require canes or crutches the rest of his life. Billie became the owner of a cigar store in Woodward, Oklahoma after prison and married Blanche Whitenack, mother of his daughter, Dollie Radler. They moved to Yale, Oklahoma in 1905 and ran a general store. In 1907 he wrote numerous letters to Blanche and Dollie getting mail in Hammon, Oklahoma where they were visiting the Whitenack family and looking for work. At the time of his death, which was February 5, 1910 in Yale, he and his wife, Blanche, were respected Yale business people. He was one of only two members of the Wild Bunch gang who survived into the twentieth century. Roy Dougherty (Arkansas Tom), the last surviving member, outlived him by over 10 years. Billie's 1907 correspondence and some photos of him (1909) are archived at the University of Oklahoma, Western History Collections.
