= Charley Pierce =

American outlaw

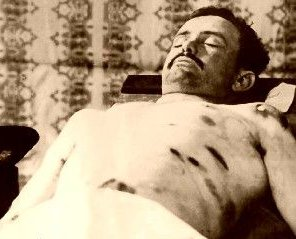
- Born: 1866; Missouri, U.S.
- Died: May 2, 1895 (aged 28–29); Pawnee, Oklahoma, U.S.
- Cause of death: Gunshot wound
- Occupation: Cowboy
- Allegiance: Dalton Gang, Wild Bunch

Charley Pierce (c. 1866 – May 2, 1895) was an American outlaw in the American Old West who rode with both the Dalton Gang and the Doolin Dalton Gang during the 1890s. He and "Bittercreek" Newcomb were killed by friends, the Dunn brothers, for bounty money.

== Early life and career ==
The younger life of Pierce is little known. He is known to have been born in Missouri but raised in Sullivan, Indiana, and was a cowboy at one time, as well as having ridden in horse races for money. His father, William Pierce, was an attorney, and Charley had three brothers, the oldest James, and his younger brother Joe. Joe Pierce was killed in a tragic mining accident while still a youth, and Willis who was learning the trade with Charley and was part of the Dalton gang for a time. He was not with his brother when he was killed, but came later when he heard of his demise. He was killed on a bridge going toward Pawnee, Oklahoma to identify his brother. He was running from the Texas Rangers on a warrant for his arrest and had a bounty on his head. He was killed by Texas Rangers that knew Charley had been killed.

Around early 1892 he joined the Dalton Gang, but after almost the entire gang was wiped out during the failed bank robbery attempts in Coffeyville, Kansas, he joined the Doolin-Dalton Gang, which was co-led by Bill Doolin and Bill Dalton. Pierce is known to have taken part in numerous bank and train robberies, and was present at the Battle of Ingalls, a gunfight between the gang and US Marshals which left three Deputy Marshals dead, two civilians dead, one gang member captured and two (including Pierce) wounded.

During the Ingalls gunfight, "Bittercreek" Newcomb and Charley Pierce were wounded, and "Arkansas Tom" Jones was captured. However, Newcomb and Pierce did escape, for a time hiding out to allow themselves to heal. Pierce had known Newcomb longer than any other member of the gang, having met him while working as a ranch hand on the Tulsa Stockyard Railhead. Once healed, the two rode to Pawnee, Oklahoma, to the house of Rose Dunn, a girlfriend of Newcomb's. Dunn's brothers, known as the Dunn Brothers, were bounty hunters, and by this time there was a significant bounty on both outlaws, believed to have been $5,000 for each. As Newcomb and Pierce dismounted, they were shot and killed by the Dunns. Pierce is buried in Guthrie, Oklahoma, where his body was taken by the Dunns to collect the bounty on him. Many years after his death, someone, though it was never known who, began placing flowers on his grave on the anniversary of his death, and threw hog guts on the grave of the Dunn Brothers who killed him.
