= William M. Dalton =

American outlaw (1863–1894)

Mason Frakes Dalton
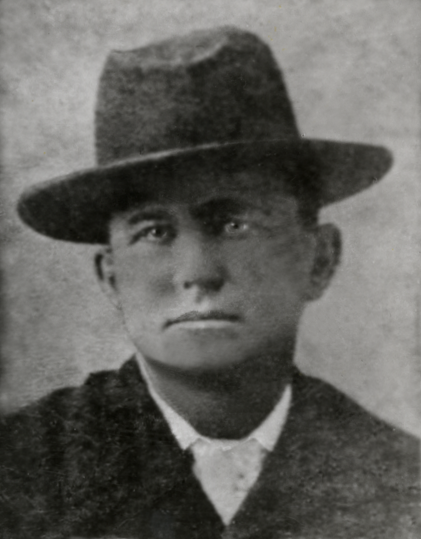
- Born: Mason Frakes Dalton; June 8, 1864; Cass County, Missouri, U.S.
- Died: June 8, 1894 (aged 30); Pooleville, Oklahoma, U.S.
- Cause of death: Gunshot wound
- Resting place: Turlock Memorial Park; 37°29′47″N 120°51′54″W
- Other name: William Marion Dalton
- Occupations: Bank & Train Robbery; Old West Outlaw
- Spouse: Jane "Jennie" Bliven (m. 1885)
- Children: Charles Coleman "Chubb" Dalton; Grace M. Dalton; Sarah "Sallie" Jane Dalton
- Parents: James Lewis Dalton; Adelaine Lee Sullivan Younger
- Allegiance: Wild Bunch
- Criminal charges: Bank robbery, train robbery

Mason Frakes Dalton (also known as William Marion "Bill" Dalton; June 8, 1864 – June 8, 1894) was an outlaw in the American Old West. He was the co-leader of the Wild Bunch gang and with his brothers Gratton, Bob and Emmett Dalton was a member of the Dalton Gang.

== Early life and career ==
Mason Frakes Dalton, also known as William Marion or "Bill", was born in Cass County, Missouri, as one of ten brothers. For a time, he was one of the two success stories among his brothers. His older brother Frank Dalton became a highly respected Deputy US Marshal at Fort Smith, Arkansas. In 1884, at twenty years old, Bill Dalton moved to California. He had traveled many times before with his father and brothers, as his father had a habit of traveling there to gamble on his own race horses. His older brothers Ben, Cole, and Lit Dalton all lived in various parts of the San Joaquin Valley. There Bill found work muleskinning with his brothers on Turner Island. He then found work for a man named Bliven in Livingston, California. Bill later married Jane Bliven and was the only one of his brothers that would start a family, fathering a son, Charles "Chubb" Coleman Dalton, and a daughter, Gracie. Bill then went into business with his brother-in-law Clark Bliven and in 1887 bought some land along the Estrella River, thirteen miles southeast of San Miguel, San Luis Obispo County, California. Bill then became Democratic central committee chairman in Merced County and also a political committeeman near Estrella.

== Outlaw career ==
From time to time between 1888 and 1889, Bill was visited by his brothers Bob, Emmett, and Grat, who had been serving as US Deputy Marshals at Fort Smith, Arkansas. Bob had been given Frank's job after he was killed attempting to arrest a bootlegger near Fort Smith. After rustling horses in the Indian Territory, Bob, Emmett, and Grat fled to California in January 1891 and worked on Bill's ranch. Bob and Emmett then attempted to rob the Los Angeles train at Alila (near present-day Pixley, California) that February and afterwards hid out at Bill's ranch.

A posse led by Sheriff Eugene Kay of Tulare County, California tracked Bob and Emmett to Bill's ranch. Unsuspecting of the Daltons, the lawmen decided to see if they could spend the night at Bill's ranch and continue their search in the morning. Bill did not know the men to be officers, but had already had Bob and Emmett hide in the barn before their arrival, and allowed the officers to stay. Early the next morning, as Sheriff Kay prepared to leave, he found the remnants of a saddle in a manure pile near Bill’s barn. The saddle was missing a leather strap, the same strap that Kay had found at the scene of the holdup. Sheriff Kay then spent the day in Paso Robles and learned what he could about Bill and his brothers. He then received a telegram from Tulare and learned that men matching the description of Bob, Emmett, and Grat had spent the past few days drinking heavily, gambling, and following the Southern Pacific pay car as it made its monthly journey down the San Joaquin Valley.

Sheriff Kay was met in Paso Robles by Southern Pacific Railway detective Will Smith and San Luis Obispo County Sheriff O’Neal, where he told them what he had learned. Unbeknownst to Kay, Smith and O'Neal then made their own trip to Bill Dalton’s ranch later that same day, expecting to surprise and arrest Bill, Bob, and Emmett. Kay had been preparing his own posse to arrest the Daltons at Bill’s ranch, but after learning that Smith and O’Neal had already left, decided it was useless and waited for Smith to return with the Daltons. When Smith and O’Neal arrived at Bill’s ranch, Bob and Emmett hid in a closet through a trapdoor that Bill had built in the attic. Bill invited the lawmen in but argued with Smith over his brother's guilt. He became angry with Smith but was calmed down by O’Neal and reluctantly allowed the lawmen to stay the night. They left the next morning empty-handed and Kay was furious with Smith.

On March 17, 1891, a Tulare County grand jury indicted brothers Bob, Emmett, Grat, and Bill Dalton for the Alila robbery. A few days later Grat and Bill were arrested and placed in the Tulare County jail. A $3,000 bounty was announced for the capture of Bob and Emmett. Bill, however, had already helped them escape California before he was arrested, and Bob and Emmett were on their way back to the Oklahoma Territory. Bill was soon able to secure bondsmen and was released. He quickly hired attorneys to defend Grat. While Grat sat in jail in Visalia, California, Bob and Emmett began making their way to Oklahoma. They borrowed money and supplies from their brothers, Cole and Lit, and made their way east across the Mojave Desert. After their horses were discovered at Ludlow, California, Sheriff Kay decided to pursue them with his deputy, Jim Ford. He discovered that the brothers had actually made their way to Utah to throw him off, and tracked them to the town of Ogden, Utah. After some close encounters, Bob and Emmett escaped capture by train. Sheriff Kay continued to track them throughout the Southwest for several months, even at one point entering Mexico, but with no success. Eventually they ended up at the Dalton home near Kingfisher, Oklahoma. The Daltons had many friends in Oklahoma willing to hide them and Sheriff Kay was forced to give up the chase in order to return to California for Grat's trial. After they realized they were no longer being pursued, Bob and Emmett robbed a train at Whorton, now Perry, Oklahoma, in May 1891. They then began to form what would become known as the Dalton Gang.

Even though much of the evidence showed that Grat was in Fresno, California the night of the Alila robbery, including the testimony of several witnesses, the influence of the powerful Southern Pacific Railroad led him to receive an unfair trial. The lawyer the Daltons had hired for Grat was corrupt and it was not mentioned by the defense, nor the prosecution, that the fireman had been accidentally killed by the expressman. This was unknown to Grat, since the Dalton brothers had all assumed that Emmett had killed the fireman. While Grat awaited his sentence, a train robbery occurred near Ceres, California on September 3, 1891, but was unsuccessful with no money being taken. Sheriff Kay suspected Bill Dalton and arrested him, as well as a man joining Bill named Riley Dean. Kay found Bill and Dean at an abandoned overland stage station where they looked as if they were either planning a robbery or to break Grat from jail. Both Bill and Dean established a clear alibi, but Bill was held in the Tulare County Jail to await trial for his part in the Alila robbery.

On September 21, Grat appeared in court to receive his sentencing, but the sentencing was instead postponed to October 6. On the night of September 27, Grat and two other men escaped from the County Jail in Visalia while Sheriff Kay was in San Francisco, California. Grat and the other two men had been slipped a saw from someone on the outside and were able to saw through the bars. Bill remained in his cell, and was found in the morning playing a popular song on the guitar that he set his own words to and titled, "You'll Never Miss My Brother Till He's Gone", and joked about how the boys had left him. Bill was acquitted and released on October 15. He then sold the lease to his ranch in San Luis Obispo County, moved his family to his wife's parents' home in Livingston, California, and left for Kingfisher, Oklahoma. After arresting the two other men who had escaped with Grat, Sheriff Kay learned that Grat was assisted by Riley Dean, and that they were both hiding on the summit of a steep mountain close to the Kings River, near Sanger, California. This would later be known as Dalton Mountain. On Christmas Eve 1891, the posses of both Sheriff Kay of Tulare County and Sheriff Hensley of Fresno County ascended the mountain to Dalton's camp. They ambushed the outlaws on their way back from a boar hunt. Riley Dean was captured, but Grat managed to escape, firing at the lawmen with his Winchester rifle and stealing a horse from the nearby Elwood ranch. Grat then rode to a friend's home near Livingston, California, and stayed there for several weeks before he escaped back to Oklahoma with the help of his brother Cole.

Bob and Emmett had meanwhile been busy in Oklahoma forming their gang. After their unsuccessful career in California they decided they could do much better in their home country and, unlike their first attempts, they began carefully planning their robberies. With Bob as the leader they recruited mostly men who had grown up with them in Oklahoma. First among these recruits were George "Bitter Creek" Newcomb and "Blackfaced" Charlie Bryant, who had received his nickname because of a gunpowder burn on one cheek. The gang's first robbery occurred at Whorton in May 1891, where they stole $1,200. Joining afterwards were Bill Doolin, Dick Broadwell, Bill Powers, and Charley Pierce. The gang then robbed several trains in Oklahoma and even though Bill did not participate in any robberies with his brothers, he acted as their spy and advisor.

On October 5, 1892, Grat Dalton, Bob Dalton, Dick Broadwell, and Bill Powers were all killed attempting to rob two banks at once in Coffeyville, Kansas. Bill's brother Emmett Dalton received 23 gunshot wounds but survived. Bill Dalton and Bill Doolin had been waiting several miles away with extra horses to aid the gang's escape. After getting tired of waiting they left, and only later learned the fate of the gang. Bill Doolin, "Bitter Creek" Newcomb, and Charlie Pierce, none of whom were at Coffeyville, were the only members left of the original Dalton Gang.

For a time Bill Doolin and his partners operated under outlaw Henry Starr (Cherokee), hiding out about 75 miles northeast of Kingfisher, Oklahoma, from where they made several raids. Doolin, Newcomb, and Pierce visited the Daltons' mother in Kingfisher to console her after her sons' deaths. Brothers Lit and Bill Dalton were also visiting their mother, and Doolin proposed that they join him and his group to avenge their brothers. Bill Dalton agreed to join them and soon took part in several robberies, but Lit refused in disgust. Henry Starr was arrested in 1893 and held for trial at Fort Smith.

As Doolin and Dalton were accepted as leaders of the gang, it became known as the Doolin-Dalton Gang, and also as the Wild Bunch. Bill Dalton took part in several robberies with the Wild Bunch, including a gun battle on September 1, 1893, at Ingalls, Oklahoma Territory, where three deputy US marshals were killed. Eventually Dalton left Doolin to form his own Dalton Gang. On May 23, 1894, Dalton and his new gang robbed the First National Bank at Longview, Texas. During the robbery one member of the gang and four citizens were killed in a shootout. This was the gang's only job.

After the gang separated with their share of the loot, Bill hid out with his family in a cabin near Elk, Indian Territory. A posse assembled by US Marshal S.T. Lindsey in Ardmore, Oklahoma, tracked Bill to the cabin and surrounded it on June 8, 1894. Dalton escaped through a window at the back of the house, but as he ran through a patch of corn was shot and killed by the Deputy Marshals.

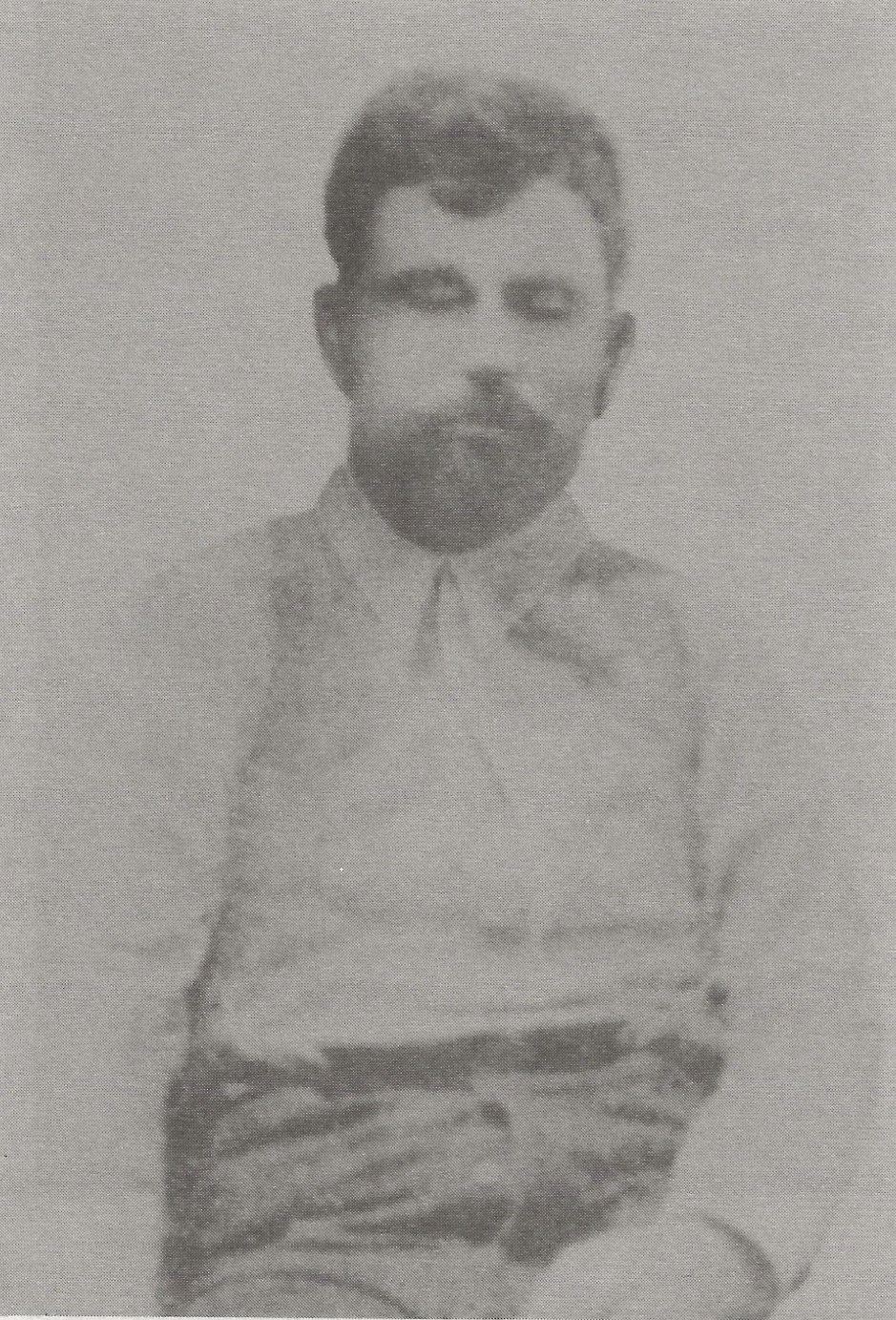
Bill Dalton, in death, June 1894

Afterwards a woman found in the house admitted she was Bill's wife Jane Dalton, and identified the body as Bill's. She then had him shipped back to California for burial. Bill was originally buried at his wife's family's home in Livingston, but after the family lost the home his body was moved to the Turlock cemetery where it remains today.

== In popular culture ==
The song "Doolin Dalton", a hit for the Eagles, was inspired by the gang. Furthermore, Desperado, the album on which the song appears, is considered a concept album inspired by the antics of various players from this era, and includes a song called "Bittercreek", a passing lyrical reference to a barmaid named 'Flo', and of course the iconic photo on the back cover of the album which features the members of the band lying face up with hands tied and appearing to be dead, much like the historical photograph of the Dalton Brothers lying dead in Coffeyville.
