= Chris Madsen =

United States Marshal (1851–1944)

- Born: Chris Madsen Rørmose; February 25, 1851; Ørsted Parish, Fyn, Denmark
- Died: January 9, 1944 (aged 92); Guthrie, Oklahoma
- Occupations: Soldier; Lawman; US Marshal

Chris Madsen (February 25, 1851 – January 9, 1944) was a lawman of the Old West who is best known as being one of The Three Guardsmen; the name given to Madsen and two other Deputy U.S. Marshals who were responsible for the apprehension and/or killing of several outlaws of that era. The Three Guardsmen consisted of Madsen, Bill Tilghman, and Heck Thomas.

== Background ==
Chris Madsen was born Christen Madsen Rørmose in Denmark. After he graduated from Kauslunde Agricultural School, the bright young man started a criminal career, resulting in several convictions for fraud and forgery. Upon immigrating to the United States in 1876, he dropped the last name, Rørmose. He later claimed to have been a soldier in the Danish Army and the French Foreign Legion. Arriving in New York City, Madsen enlisted in the U.S. Army on January 21, 1876, and served fifteen years in the Fifth Cavalry. He was Quartermaster Sergeant of the Fifth Cavalry and fought in many major Indian campaigns. Later, in 1883, he became President Chester A. Arthur's guide to Yellowstone.

== Law career ==
Discharged from the U.S. Army on January 10, 1891, Madsen became a Deputy U.S. Marshal under U.S. Marshal William Grimes in Indian Territory and Oklahoma Territory. He had joined the U.S. Marshals with the priority of policing the vast Oklahoma Territory. Over 300 outlaws were either apprehended or killed by Madsen, Thomas and Tilghman, thus leading to their nickname, The Three Guardsmen. The three lawmen were primarily responsible for bringing down outlaw Bill Doolin and his infamous Wild Bunch a.k.a. the Doolin-Dalton Gang. Madsen was personally responsible for the killings of Doolin-Dalton gang members Dan "Dynamite Dick" Clifton, George "Red Buck" Waightman, and Richard "Little Dick" West.

In 1898, he joined Theodore Roosevelt's Rough Riders, serving as Quartermaster Sergeant. After the Spanish–American War, Madsen returned to work in Indian Territory as a Deputy U.S. Marshal. In 1911, he was appointed U.S. Marshal for the entire State of Oklahoma. While in his sixties he was appointed Chief of Police for Oklahoma City. From 1918 to 1922 he served as a Special Investigator for the Governor of Oklahoma. He eventually settled in Guthrie, Oklahoma, and at the outset of World War I, he tried to enlist in the U.S. Army but was rejected due to his age.

== Personal life ==
He was married to Margaret Bell Morris (1871-1898). They were the parents of Marion (1889) and Christian (1890). Chris Madsen died at the age of ninety-two in Guthrie, Oklahoma, and was buried in the Frisco Cemetery in Yukon, Oklahoma.

== See also ==
- The Passing of the Oklahoma Outlaws

== Additional Sources ==
- Croy, Homer (1958) Trigger Marshal: The Story of Chris Madsen (New York: Duell, Sloan and Pearce)
- Samuelson, Nancy B. (1998) Shoot From The Lip: The Lives, Legends, and Lies of the Three Guardsmen of Oklahoma and U.S. Marshal Nix (Eastford, Conn.: Shooting Star Press)
- Reasoner, James (2003) Draw: The Greatest Gunfighters of the American West (Penguin Putnam Inc; Berkley Trade)
- Andersen, Frans Ørsted (2018) Et liv på kanten. En biografisk fortælling om Chris Madsens utrolige liv (Denmark, Mellemgaard Publisher)
- Andersen, Frans Ørsted (2019) Chris Madsen: 1876 A Transformative Year. In: Wild West History Association Journal. Number 2, June 2019.
