= Wild Bunch =

Gang of outlaws in central USA in 1890s

The Wild Bunch
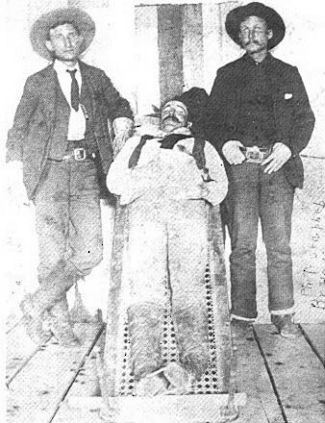
- Deputy US Marshals William Banks (left) and Isaac S. Prater (right) killed William "Tulsa Jack" Blake (center) near Dover, Oklahoma Territory, 1895
- Founded: July 16, 1892
- Founding location: Ingalls, Oklahoma Territory
- Years active: 1892–1895
- Territory: Indian Territory
- Membership: 13 members
- Activities: Robbing banks and stores, holding up trains
- Notable members: Bill Doolin; William Marion "Bill" Dalton; George "Bitter Creek" Newcomb; Charley Pierce; Oliver "Ol" Yantis; William "Tulsa Jack" Blake; Dan "Dynamite Dick" Clifton; Roy Daugherty "Arkansas Tom Jones"; George "Red Buck" Waightman; Richard "Little Dick" West; William F. "Little Bill" Raidler

The Wild Bunch, also known as the Doolin–Dalton Gang, or the Oklahombres, were a gang of American outlaws based in the Indian Territory in the late 19th and early 20th centuries. They were active in Kansas, Missouri, Arkansas, and Oklahoma Territory during the 1890s—robbing banks and stores, holding up trains, and killing lawmen. They were also known as The Oklahoma Long Riders because of the long dusters that they wore.

The gang formed in the last decade of the 19th century, and most of its members were killed before 1900. Only two of its eleven members survived into the 20th century, and all eleven met violent deaths in gun battles with lawmen except Bill Raidler who got crippled and survived for another several years.

== Members ==
The gang was led by Bill Doolin and William Marion "Bill" Dalton; it included the following men at various times: William "Tulsa Jack" Blake, Dan "Dynamite Dick" Clifton, Roy Daugherty (a.k.a. "Arkansas Tom Jones"), George "Bitter Creek" Newcomb (a.k.a. "Slaughter Kid"), Charley Pierce, William F. "Little Bill" Raidler, George "Red Buck" Waightman, Richard "Little Dick" West, and Oliver "Ol" Yantis. Additionally, two teenaged girls, known as Little Britches and Cattle Annie, followed the gang, informing them of the movements of law enforcement officers whenever they pursued the criminals.

Doolin, Newcomb, and Pierce had previously been members of the Dalton Gang, which had been dominated by Bill Dalton's brothers. Bill Dalton had aided his brothers in their gang, but had never taken part in any of their robberies and did not get involved until after the deaths of two of them at a bank robbery in Coffeyville, Kansas. Doolin had worked as a cowboy in Kansas and the Cherokee Outlet. As a leader of the Wild Bunch, he had something of a Robin Hood image because he and his gang preyed on wealthy institutions. He and his gang received considerable aid from the general public in eluding the law (see Ingalls, Oklahoma).

== Origins ==
What was known as the Dalton Gang had been dominated by several Dalton brothers, and led by Bob Dalton. Doolin, Newcomb, and Charley Pierce were also members. They took part in the botched train robbery in Adair, Oklahoma Territory, on July 15, 1892, in which two guards and two townsmen, both doctors, were wounded, one of the doctors dying the next day. Doolin, Newcomb, and Pierce complained that Bob Dalton was not dividing money fairly among the gang and left in protest, but would later return. According to some accounts, Bob Dalton told Doolin, Newcomb, and Pierce that he no longer needed them. Doolin and his friends returned to their hideout in Ingalls, Oklahoma Territory. On October 5, four of the remaining five members of the Dalton Gang would be killed in Coffeyville, Kansas during a botched robbery.

For a time, Doolin and his partners operated under outlaw Henry Starr (Cherokee), hiding out about 75 miles northeast of Kingfisher, Oklahoma, from where they made several raids. Doolin, Newcomb, and Pierce visited the Daltons' mother in Kingfisher to console her after her sons' deaths. Brothers Lit and Bill Dalton were also visiting their mother, and Doolin proposed that they join him and his group to avenge their brothers. Bill Dalton agreed to join them and soon took part in several robberies, but Lit refused in disgust. Henry Starr was arrested in 1893 and held for trial at Fort Smith.

As Doolin and Dalton were accepted as leaders of the gang, it became known as the Doolin—Dalton Gang, and also as the Wild Bunch. They hid out in northeastern Payne County, and were obtaining ammunition and supplies at the little village of Ingalls.

== Career ==
Doolin soon took action: On November 1, 1892, his new gang, the Wild Bunch, robbed the Ford County Bank at Spearville, Kansas, getting away with all the cash on hand and over $1,500 in treasury notes. From the postcard descriptions sent out, the city marshal of Stillwater, Oklahoma Territory recognized Ol' Yantis, the gang's newest member. The marshal's posse soon cornered and killed Yantis in a shootout.

On June 11, 1893, the Wild Bunch held up a Santa Fe train west of Cimarron, Kansas. They took $1,000 in silver from the California-New Mexico Express. A sheriff's posse from old Beaver County, Oklahoma Territory, caught up with the gang north of Fort Supply. The gang got away but, in the ensuing gunfight, Doolin was shot in the left foot. The injury gave him pain for the rest of his life.

On September 1, 1893, a posse organized by the new U.S. Marshal, Evett Dumas "E.D." Nix, entered the outlaw town of Ingalls with the intent to capture the gang. In what would be remembered as the Battle of Ingalls, three of the fourteen lawmen were killed in the gunfire. Two town citizens also died; one was killed protecting the outlaws.

After a short break the gang continued its activities in Oklahoma Territory. On January 3, 1894, Pierce and Waightman held up the store and post office at Clarkson. On January 23, the gang robbed the Farmers Citizens Bank at Pawnee, and March 10, the Wild Bunch robbed the Santa Fe Railway station at Woodward of more than $6,000.

On March 20, US Marshal E.D. Nix sent the Three Guardsmen with a directive to take care of the Wild Bunch. The directive stated in part, "I have selected you to do this work, placing explicit confidence in your abilities to cope with those desperadoes and bring them in—alive if possible—dead if necessary."

On April 1, 1894, the gang attempted to rob the store of retired US Deputy Marshal W.H. Carr at Sacred Heart, Indian Territory. Although shot through the stomach, Carr shot Newcomb in the shoulder, and the gang fled without getting anything.

On May 10, 1894, the Wild Bunch robbed the bank at Southwest City, Missouri, of $4,000, wounding several townspeople and killing one.

On May 21, 1894, the jurors in the Roy Daugherty (a.k.a. "Arkansas Tom Jones") trial found him guilty of manslaughter rather than murder in the killing of three Deputy US Marshals. Frank Dale, the territorial judge hearing the case, returned to Guthrie, the territorial capitol in Oklahoma, and told Nix, " ... you will instruct your deputies to bring them in dead."

Bill Dalton, meanwhile, had left Doolin to form his own Dalton Gang. On May 23, 1894, Dalton and his new gang robbed the First National Bank at Longview, Texas. This was the gang's only job. Various posses would kill three of the members and sent the last one to life in prison.

On December 19, 1894, Doolin was reportedly one of six men who attempted to rob the J.R. Pearce store at Texana, Oklahoma Territory; they were driven off having looted with less than $20.00 worth of merchandise.

On April 3, 1895, the Wild Bunch, without Doolin, held up a Rock Island train at Dover, Oklahoma. Unable to open the safe containing the $50,000 army payroll, they robbed passengers of cash and jewelry. Deputy U.S. Marshal Chris Madsen and his posse took a special train to Dover and picked up the trail at daybreak, surprising the gang around noon. The marshals killed Blake and scattered the gang. This was the last robbery committed by the Wild Bunch as a gang, although some of its members kept up the robberies and killings for which they were known.

== Demise ==
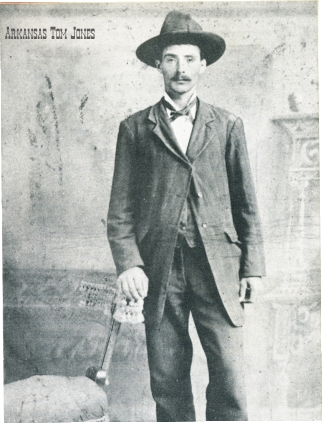
Roy Daugherty a.k.a. "Arkansas Tom Jones"

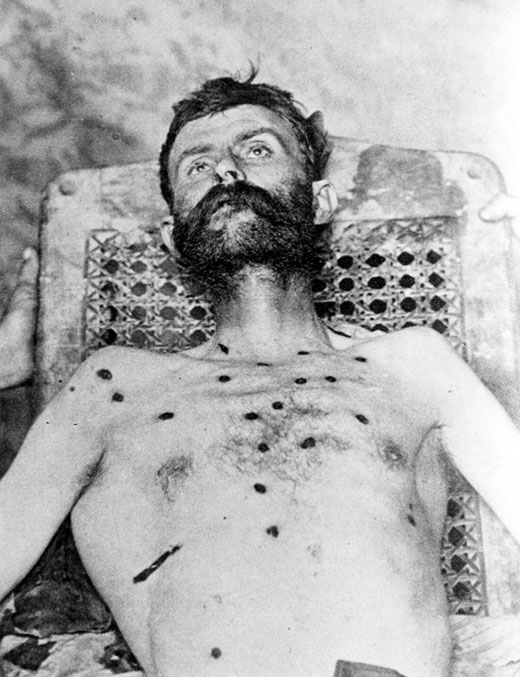
Bill Doolin

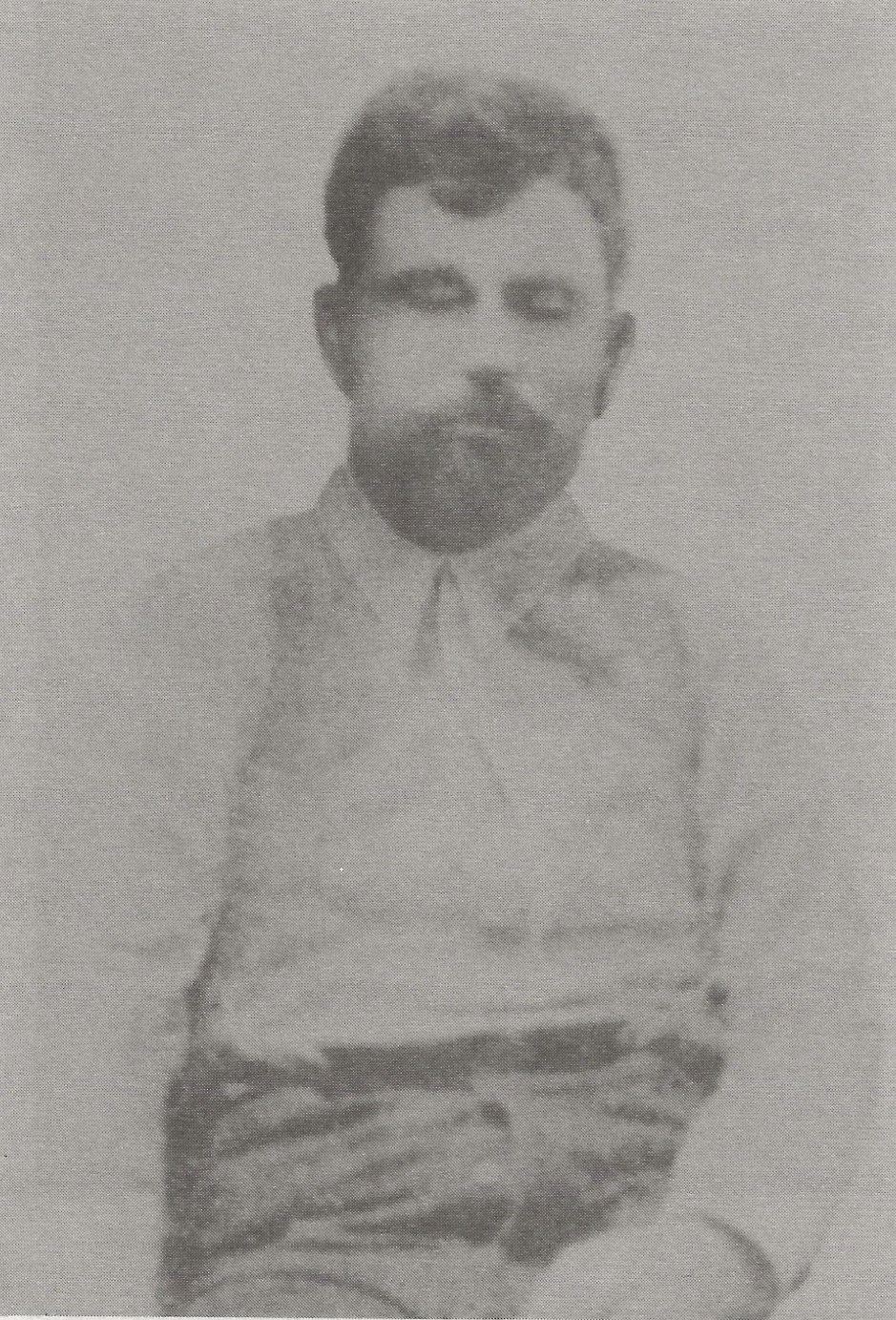
Bill Dalton, in death, June 1894

U.S. Marshal Evett "E.D." Nix was appointed in 1893. He made his main priority the toppling of the Doolin-Dalton Gang. Nix appointed one hundred Deputy U.S. Marshals to the task, insisting that they hunt down all outlaws, but making this gang a priority. Marshal Nix was staunchly supportive of his Deputies and whatever they felt was necessary to bring down the gang. With him as their defender politically, his Deputy Marshals systematically hunted down the gang members.

- Oliver "Ol" Yantis — killed November 29, 1892 at Orlando, Oklahoma Territory by Ford County, Kansas Sheriff Chalkey Beeson and Deputy U.S. Marshal Tom Hueston.
- Roy Daugherty a.k.a. "Arkansas Tom Jones" — captured September 1, 1893, in Ingalls, Oklahoma Territory; convicted and sentenced to prison; pardoned in 1910; committed other robberies; finally tracked down and killed in a shootout while resisting arrest August 16, 1924, in Joplin, Missouri.
- William Marion "Bill" Dalton — killed June 8, 1894, near Elk, Indian Territory, by an Anadarko, Oklahoma Territory posse.
- William "Tulsa Jack" Blake — killed April 4, 1895, near Ames, Oklahoma Territory, by Deputy U.S. Marshals Will Banks and Isaac Prater.
- George "Bitter Creek" Newcomb a.k.a. "Slaughter Kid" — killed May 2, 1895, in Payne County, Oklahoma Territory, by the Dunn Brothers, who were bounty hunters.
- Charley Pierce — killed May 2, 1895, in Payne County, Oklahoma Territory, by the Dunn brothers.
- William F. "Little Bill" Raidler — shot and captured September 6, 1895, by Deputy U.S. Marshal Bill Tilghman; paroled in 1903 because of complication from wounds received when he was captured; died 1904.
- Bill Doolin — captured January 15, 1896, in Eureka Springs, Arkansas by Deputy U.S. Marshal Bill Tilghman; escaped with Dan "Dynamite Dick" Clifton; then killed August 24, 1896, in Lawson, Oklahoma Territory, by a posse led by Deputy U.S. Marshal Heck Thomas.
- George "Red Buck" Waightman — killed March 4, 1896, near Arapaho, Oklahoma Territory, by a Custer County posse.
- Dan "Dynamite Dick" Clifton — captured June 1896 by Deputy U.S. Marshals in Texas; escaped with Bill Doolin; killed November 7, 1897, near Checotah, Indian Territory, by Deputy U.S. Marshals under the direction of Deputy U.S. Marshal Chris Madsen.
- Richard "Little Dick" West — killed April 8, 1898, in Logan County, Oklahoma Territory, by Deputy U.S. Marshals under Deputy U.S. Marshal Chris Madsen.

== In popular culture ==
- The Doolin Gang was featured in Season 1, Episode 21 (air date June 10, 1954) of the 1950s syndicated television series, Stories of the Century, starring and narrated by Jim Davis.
- The western movie The Wild Bunch (1969) had no connection with the actual criminal gang.
- A fictional bandit gang naming itself the Wild Bunch (and numbering over 150 members) appears in the Italian Western My Name Is Nobody (1973).
- The gang was the inspiration for the album Desperado (1973) by the Eagles and the songs "Doolin-Dalton" and "Bitter Creek" on that album.
- A movie starring Randolph Scott, The Doolins of Oklahoma, portrayed Doolin as a Robin Hood type character.
- A movie starring Burt Lancaster named Cattle Annie and Little Britches, released April 24, 1981, follows the story of two infatuated teens who followed and assisted the Doolin-Dalton gang.
- A story about the demise of the group was published in the comic book Detective Comics Vol 1. #175 in 1951.
