= Heck Thomas =

American lawman

Henry Andrew "Heck" Thomas
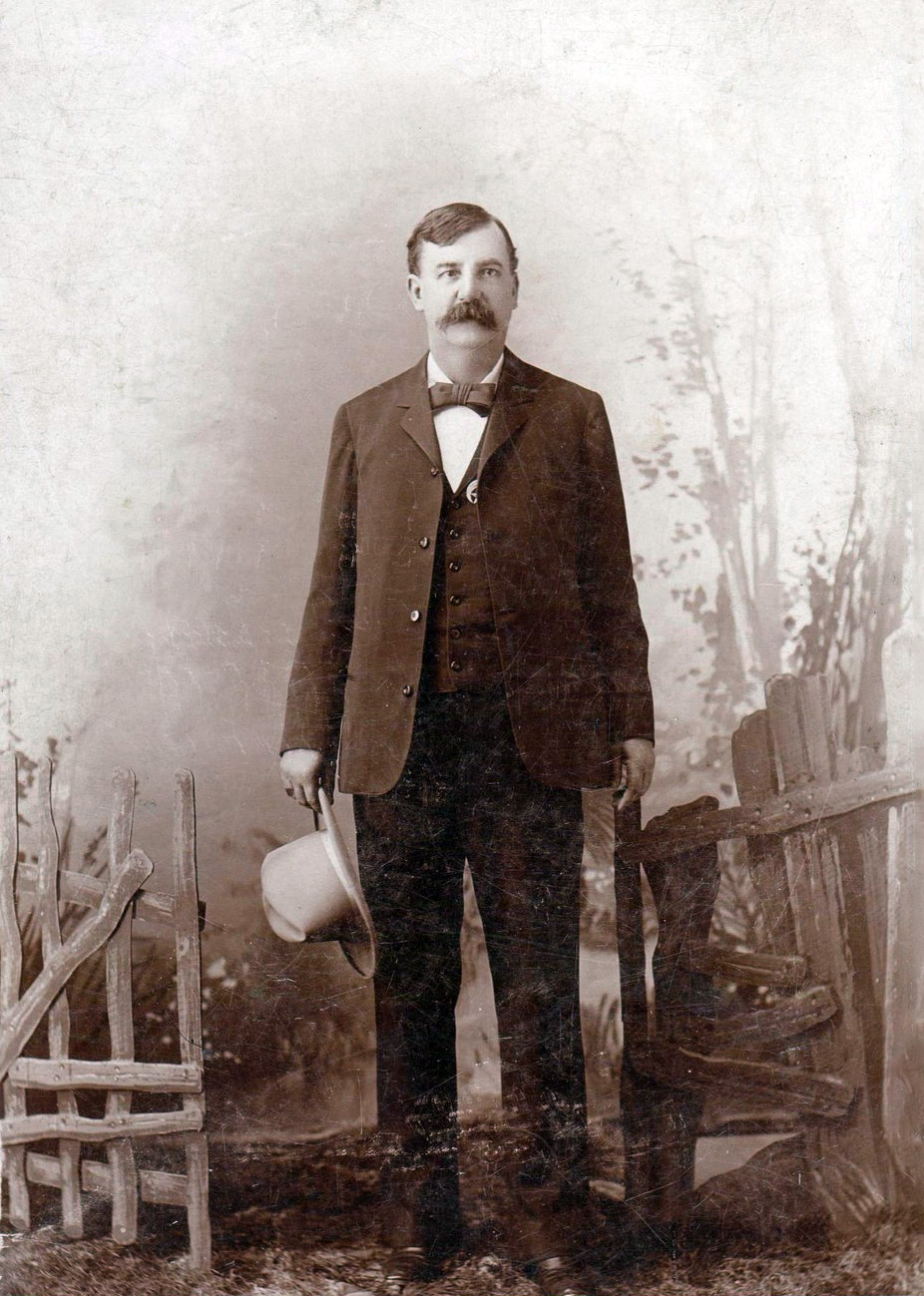
- Born: January 6, 1850; Oxford, Georgia, US
- Died: August 14, 1912 (aged 62); Lawton, Oklahoma, US
- Resting place: Highland Cemetery; 34°37′56″N 98°24′1″W
- Occupations: Lawman; Gunfighter; Gambler; Railroad Agent
- Spouses: Isabella Stewart Gray Thomas-Oliphant (married 1871); Mattie Mowbray
- Children: 6
- Parents: Lovick Pierce Thomas, I; Martha Ann Fullwood Thomas

Henry Andrew "Heck" Thomas (January 3, 1850 – August 14, 1912) was a lawman on the American frontier, most notably in Indian Territory. He was known for helping bring law and order to the region. In 1889 as a deputy in Fort Smith, Arkansas, he tried to capture Ned Christie, wanted as a suspect in the killing of a US marshal.

Thomas was among the lawmen who ended the run of the Wild Bunch, also known as the Doolin-Dalton Gang. Emmett Dalton, the surviving member of the gang, said that due to Thomas's relentless pursuit, they attempted two simultaneous robberies in Coffeyville, Kansas, planning to leave the territory with a haul. These failed and four gang members died in a shootout there. In August 1896, Thomas led a posse that tracked down and killed outlaw Bill Doolin.

== Early life ==
Thomas was born in 1850 in Oxford, Georgia, the youngest of five children of Martha Ann Bedell (née Fullwood) and Lovick Pierce Thomas, I.

At the beginning of the American Civil War, Thomas was twelve when he accompanied his father and his uncle, Edward Lloyd Thomas, to war as a courier. The men were officers in the 35th Georgia Infantry and fought in the battlefields in Virginia.

== Career ==
On September 1, 1862, Union General Philip Kearny was killed at the Battle of Chantilly. Young "Heck" Thomas was entrusted with the general's horse and equipment; Confederate General Robert E. Lee ordered him to take them through the lines to General Kearny's widow. Thomas recounted this in a letter to his brother Lovick Pierce Thomas, II:

One evening while the fight was going on or, rather, just before dark, a soldier came to the rear where Uncle Ed's baggage and the darkies and I were, leading a black horse with saddle and bridle. He brought also a sword. Just after this, Stonewall Jackson crossed over into Maryland and captured the city of Frederick; that was after taking Harper's Ferry and about 14,000 federal prisoners. These prisoners were held by Uncle Ed's brigade, while the army was fighting the Battle of Sharpsburg. We could see the smoke and hear they cannon from Harper's Ferry. While we were at Harpers Ferry, General Lee sent an order to uncle Ed for the horse and equipments. I carried them forward, and it was one of the proudest minutes of my life when I found myself under the observation of General Robert E. Lee. Then General Lee sent the horse and everything through the lines, under a flag of truce, to General Kearney's [sic] widow. I had ridden the horse and cared for him up to that time, and I hated to part with him.

In 1863, Thomas contracted typhoid fever and returned to his family in Athens, Georgia. As a young man, he clerked in Atlanta at his brother Lovick's store. Later he worked as an Atlanta policeman. In 1871, he married Isabel Gray.

Thomas and his family migrated to Texas in 1875; with the help of his cousin, Jim Thomas, he obtained a job as a guard with the railroad. Thomas was promoted to railroad detective and later went to work for the Fort Worth Detective Association. He was appointed a U.S. Deputy Marshal based in Fort Smith, Arkansas, working under U.S. District Judge Isaac C. Parker. Parker's district included Indian Territory.

By 1889, Thomas teamed with two other deputy U.S. marshals, Chris Madsen and Bill Tilghman. They became known as the Three Guardsmen and were credited with bringing law and order to the Indian Territory (this later became the state of Oklahoma in 1907.)

The Three Guardsmen were credited with capturing more than three hundred outlaws over the next decade, and killing several. They were credited with ending the Wild Bunch, also known as the Doolin Gang.

Years after being released from prison, Emmett Dalton said that Thomas's relentless pursuit of the Dalton Gang was why they had tried to pull off two simultaneous bank robberies in Coffeyville in southeastern Kansas. They wanted to make one big score and leave the territory for a time. But four of the gang were killed in the shootout and only Emmett Dalton survived.

In August 1896, Thomas led a posse that tracked down and killed outlaw Bill Doolin. He had been captured, convicted and imprisoned but had escaped on July 5, 1896. By 1902, there were many European-American settlements in what became Oklahoma. Thomas was sent to Lawton. There he resigned as deputy marshal after being elected as the first police chief in the town. He served for seven years until his health began to fail.

Thomas assembled a posse, and chased and captured bank robbers in the 1908 silent film The Bank Robbery. The outlaws were led by Al Jennings. The one-reel movie was directed by his former colleague Bill Tilghman. James Bennie Kent was the cinema-photographer, and it was produced by the Oklahoma Natural Mutoscene Company. The film was shot in Cache, Oklahoma, and at the Wichita Mountains Wildlife Refuge. Comanche leader Quanah Parker had a bit part. During the filming, a bystander thought the bank was really being robbed and jumped out a window to run for the police.

Thomas died aged 62 in Lawton, Oklahoma, on August 14, 1912, of Bright's disease.

== In popular culture ==
Heck Thomas was featured as a character in two episodes of the syndicated television anthology series, Death Valley Days, hosted by Ronald Reagan. In "A Wedding Dress" (1960), Charles Fredericks played Thomas. Brad Johnson, cast as lead Bill Tilghman, pursues the Doolin gang in Oklahoma Territory with Thomas. In "There Was Another Dalton Brother" (1964), actor Robert Anderson (1920–1996) played Thomas. He serves as a deputy US Marshal along with Frank Dalton (Don Collier), who questions a suspect in a missing persons case.

Thomas was also featured in the original series Wild West Chronicles on INSP and Peacock TV played by David Thomas Newman
