= Dan Clifton =

American Old West outlaw (1865–1896?)

Dan Clifton (1865–1896?), known as Dynamite Dan or Dynamite Dick, was an American Old West outlaw and member of the Doolin Gang.

Clifton was a minor criminal wanted in the Oklahoma Territory for robbery, safecracking, and cattle rustling before joining the Doolin Gang in 1892. Upon joining the gang, Clifton took part in the remainder of the Doolin Gang's bank robberies, including the 1893 gunfight with law enforcement at Ingalls, Oklahoma, where three of his fingers were shot off. Following the gang's escape, and eventual disbandment, a bounty of $3,500 was placed on Clifton, who was becoming popularly known as the "most killed outlaw in America", as people would repeatedly turn in a corpse claiming the body as Clifton's, despite the fact the bodies had all 10 fingers, while others, who would randomly cut off three fingers, would often cut the wrong ones. Clifton was reportedly killed near Blackwell, Oklahoma, by Deputy US Marshal Chris Madsen in 1896. While the man in question was missing the correct fingers, the outlaw killed was suspected to have actually been Buck McGregg. That is unlikely, though, as Clifton never surfaced again, and Madsen was said to have known Clifton.

Actor Buck Taylor was cast as Clifton under the nickname "Dynamite Dick", instead of "Dynamite Dan", in the 1981 film, Cattle Annie and Little Britches, a fictional portrayal of teenaged Oklahoma bandits.

A character named after Clifton appears in the 1997 Western-themed first-person shooter Outlaws by LucasArts. In the game, Richard "Dynamite Dick" Clifton is an English immigrant and wanted outlaw who favors dynamite as his preferred weapon and is one of five bounty targets pursued by protagonist U.S. Marshal James Anderson in the game's "Marshal Training" bonus missions. In the game's manual, he is described as a gunfighter and safecracker who once ran with the Purcell Gang. The historical Clifton was also a known safecracker as well as a thief and cattle rustler who ran with Bill Doolin's gang.
