= George Newcomb =

American Old West outlaw

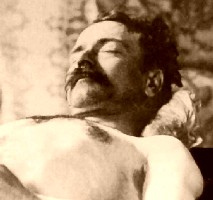
- Newcomb's body on display after his death
- Born: 1866; Fort Scott, Kansas, U.S.
- Died: May 2, 1895 (aged 28-29); Pawnee, Indian Territory (now Oklahoma), U.S.
- Cause of death: Gunshot wound
- Other name: Bittercreek Newcomb
- Occupation: Cowboy
- Allegiance: Dalton Gang, Wild Bunch
- Criminal charges: Bank robbery

George "Bitter Creek" Newcomb (1866 – May 2, 1895) was an American outlaw of the American Old West. Initially a member of the Dalton Gang, he was deemed "too wild" by Bob Dalton and subsequently joined Bill Doolin in forming the Wild Bunch gang.

== Early life and career ==
Newcomb was born near Fort Scott, Kansas in 1866. From a poor family, he began working as a cowboy early in life, at the age of 12. Newcomb's first job was on the "Long S Ranch", owned by C.C. Slaughter. Circa 1892, he drifted into the Oklahoma Territory, where he met Bill Doolin.

The Wild Bunch held its origins in the Dalton Gang, of which Newcomb, Doolin, and Charley Pierce were members. They took part in the botched train robbery in Adair, Oklahoma Territory, on July 15, 1892, in which two guards and two townsmen, both doctors, were wounded, one of the doctors dying the next day. Doolin, Newcomb, and Pierce complained that Bob was not dividing money fairly amongst the gang and left in protest, but would later return. According to some accounts, Bob Dalton told Doolin, Newcomb, and Pierce that he no longer needed them. Doolin and his friends returned to their hideout in Ingalls, Oklahoma Territory. On October 5, the remaining members of the Dalton Gang would be killed (except Emmett who survived despite being shot 27 times) in Coffeyville, Kansas.

Doolin organized his own gang in 1893, calling them the Wild Bunch, from the remains of the original Dalton Gang with Newcomb as a member. Bill Dalton later also joined the group, and they became known as the Doolin-Dalton Gang. Newcomb also began a romantic relationship with a 14-year-old girl named Rose Dunn; she had four brothers who were outlaws and knew Newcomb, though they later became bounty hunters, calling themselves the Dunn Brothers. By 1895, Newcomb was a fugitive with a $5,000 reward on him, dead or alive. Rose Dunn traveled with him, since she could easily go into a town to purchase supplies.

The gang often took refuge in the town of Ingalls, Oklahoma, which was frequented by numerous outlaw gangs of the day, and in which the local residents often defended the outlaws and assisted in hiding them from lawmen, due to the outlaws contributing greatly to the local economy. In one shootout with lawmen in Ingalls, called the Battle of Ingalls, during which three lawmen and three outlaws were shot, Rose Dunn was alleged to have helped save Newcomb's life after he had been wounded, by running through the gun-battle bringing him extra ammunition, and firing a rifle at lawmen while he reloaded his pistols. However, that is believed to be legend, and by the US Marshals' account, Newcomb fought less than admirably, firing at most two shots before being wounded and fleeing. After several shootouts with lawmen, Newcomb fled with outlaw Charley Pierce to a hideout near Norman, Oklahoma, both of them having been wounded in the Ingalls shootout with US Marshals.

== Death ==
On May 2, 1895, Newcomb and Charley Pierce rode up to the Dunn ranch, possibly to visit Rose. When they dismounted, her brothers opened fire, dropping both outlaws. The next day, the Dunn brothers had loaded the two bodies into their wagon and were driving it into town to collect the reward, when Newcomb suddenly moaned and asked for water, to which one of the brothers responded with another bullet.

It is not known as to whether Rose Dunn assisted in this or not. There has been much speculation that Rose Dunn was in contact with her family, and that her brothers followed her to the ranch, then waited for her to leave before they entered and killed the two outlaws. She denied that she had betrayed Newcomb, and her brothers supported her version of the story, indicating that she had no knowledge that they were tracking Newcomb, for their fear that she would reveal this to Newcomb and thus eliminate their ability to surprise the outlaws. Bill Dunn, the leader of the Dunn Brothers, was killed shortly thereafter when he fired two rounds at Sheriff Frank Canton, a well known gunman, due to Canton investigating the brothers for cattle rustling, at which time Canton returned fire, killing Dunn.
