= Bill Doolin =

American bandit and founder of the Wild Bunch gang

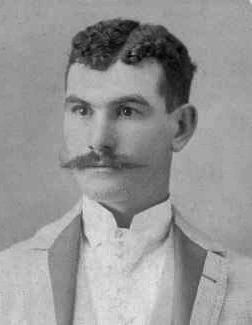
- Bill Doolin, c. early 1890s
- Born: January 26, 1858; Johnson County, Arkansas, U.S.
- Died: August 24, 1896 (aged 38); Lawson, Oklahoma Territory, U.S.
- Cause of death: Gunshot wound
- Resting place: Summit View Cemetery; 35°53′45″N 97°24′12″W
- Occupations: Founder of the Wild Bunch; Old West Outlaw; Bank, Stagecoach, Train Robbery
- Spouse: Edith Ellsworth Doolin
- Children: 1 (son)
- Parents: Michael Doolin; Artemina Beller Doolin

William Doolin (January 26, 1858 – August 24, 1896) was an American bandit and outlaw; Doolin–Dalton Gang. Like the earlier Dalton Gang, the group specialized in bank, train, and stagecoach robberies in Arkansas, Kansas, Indiana, and the Oklahoma Territory during the early to mid-1890s.

== Early life ==
Doolin was born in 1858 in Johnson County, Arkansas, to Michael Doolin, a share-cropper, and the former Artemina Beller. Doolin was one of six children, and he and his family farmed forty acres northeast of Clarksville, Arkansas, near Big Piney River. Doolin left home in 1881 to become a cowboy in Indian Territory, where he worked for cattleman Oscar Halsell, a Texas native. During this time, Doolin worked with other cowboy and outlaw names of the day, including George Newcomb (known as "Bitter Creek"), Charley Pierce, Bill Power, Dick Broadwell, Bill "Tulsa Jack" Blake, Dan "Dynamite Dick" Clifton, Billie "Little Bill" Raidler and the better-known Emmett Dalton.

Doolin's first encounter with the law came on July 4, 1891, in Coffeyville in southeastern Kansas. Doolin and some friends were drunk in public, and lawmen attempted to confiscate their alcohol since Kansas was a dry state. A shootout ensued, and the lawmen were wounded. Doolin escaped capture by fleeing.

== Dalton Gang ==
Shortly thereafter, Doolin became a member of the Dalton Gang. On October 5, 1892, the Dalton Gang tried to rob two banks simultaneously in Coffeyville. It was an utter failure. Coffeyville residents and lawmen rallied in a shootout against the outlaws, resulting in four of the five gang members being killed. Emmett Dalton was captured and convicted at trial, and imprisoned. Historians have speculated that a sixth gang member was in town, holding the horses in an alley, and escaped. The sixth man has never been identified. Some speculate that he may have been Bill Doolin.

== Wild Bunch ==
In late 1892, Doolin formed his own gang, the Wild Bunch( not to be confused with The Northern Wyoming Gang)On November 1, 1892, the gang robbed a bank in Spearville, Kansas. After the robbery, the gang fled with gang member Oliver Yantis to Oklahoma Territory, where they hid out at the house of Yantis's sister. Less than a month later, the gang was tracked to that location. In a shootout, Yantis was killed, but the rest of the gang escaped.

Two teenaged girls, known as Little Britches and Cattle Annie, also followed the gang as bandits. They warned the men whenever law-enforcement officers were in pursuit. Sources indicate that Doolin gave bandit Jennie Stevens her nickname of Little Britches.

Following the Spearville robbery, the gang embarked on a spree of successful bank and train robberies. In March 1893, Doolin married Edith Ellsworth in Ingalls, Oklahoma. Shortly thereafter, Doolin and his gang robbed a train near Cimarron, Kansas. During a shootout with lawmen, Doolin was shot and seriously wounded in the foot. He retreated to Ingalls.

On September 1, 1893, 14 deputy U.S. marshals entered Ingalls to apprehend the gang. The armed confrontation became known as the Battle of Ingalls. During the shootout, three marshals and two bystanders were killed, one bystander was wounded, three of the gang members were wounded, and gang member "Arkansas Tom Jones" was wounded and captured. Doolin shot and killed Deputy Marshal Richard Speed during that shootout.

For a time, the Wild Bunch was the most powerful outlaw group in the Old West. Because of the relentless pursuit by the deputy marshals known as the Three Guardsmen (lawmen Bill Tilghman, Chris Madsen, and Heck Thomas), by the end of 1894, they had either captured or killed many of the gang. In late 1894, gang member Bill Dalton was killed by U.S. marshals. Rewards were offered for the capture or death of remaining gang members, a lure that sometimes turned friends into foes to collect the money. On May 1, 1895, gang members Charlie Pierce and George "Bittercreek" Newcomb were shot and killed by bounty hunters known as the Dunn brothers. They were the older brothers of Rose Dunn, the teenaged girlfriend of Newcomb. Allegedly, she had betrayed Newcomb, but her brothers may have trailed her to the outlaws' hideout.

Doolin fled to New Mexico Territory, where he hid with outlaw Richard "Little Dick" West during the summer of 1895. In late 1895, Doolin and his wife hid out near Burden, Kansas. They went over the border to visit the resort community of Eureka Springs in northwestern Arkansas. There, Doolin soaked in the sulfur springs in the bathhouses; the waters relieved the rheumatism in his foot that set in after an earlier gunshot. In early 1896, Doolin was captured in a bathhouse by deputy marshal Bill Tilghman.

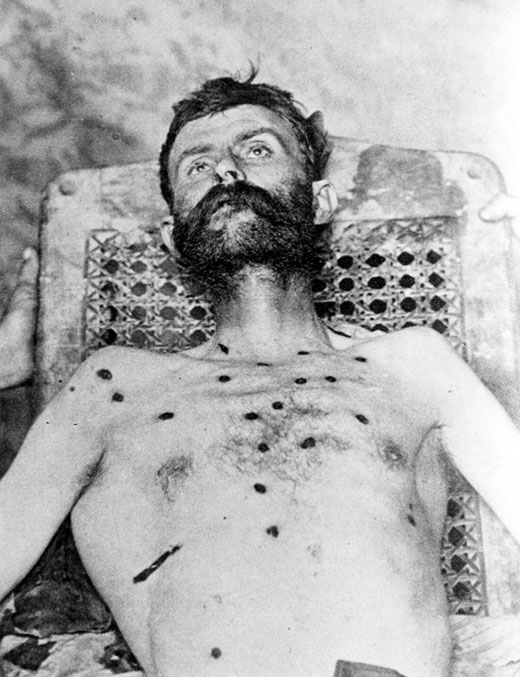
Posthumous photograph of Bill Doolin

Doolin escaped from jail on July 5, and took refuge with his wife in Lawson in the Oklahoma Territory. There, on August 24, Doolin was killed by a shotgun blast in a confrontation with Deputy U.S. Marshal Heck Thomas.

Bill Doolin is buried next to outlaw Elmer McCurdy, in the Boot Hill section of Summit View Cemetery in Guthrie, Oklahoma.

By the end of 1898, all but one of the remaining former Wild Bunch gang were dead, having been killed in various shootouts with lawmen. Heck Thomas had tracked most of them; the remainder were tracked down and eliminated by lawmen Madsen and Tilghman, or other posses. The only survivor of the Wild Bunch was "Little Bill" Raidler (aka Radler) who had been shot and captured by Tilghman in Osage territory near Caney Creek on September 6, 1895. Little Billie had split from the gang after the Rock Island robbery near Dover. Near death, Billie was nursed back to health and stood trial in Kingfisher, Ok. He was permanently crippled, but sent to the Ohio Penitentiary near Columbus. He was released for poor health in 1892 and returned to western Oklahoma where he married his girlfriend, Blanch Whitenack on Nov.19, 1902 in Taloga, Oklahoma. He died an early, natural death in about 1910.

== In popular media ==
- Burt Lancaster portrayed Doolin in the film Cattle Annie and Little Britches (1981). Lancaster was 65 during the shooting of the film, but was playing Doolin in his 30s.
- In the film Return of the Bad Men (1948), Robert Armstrong plays Doolin as the leader of a gang more powerful than the Wild Bunch. This fictional account added the Sundance Kid, Billy the Kid, and two of the Younger brothers to the known members of Doolin's gang. Randolph Scott, as Marshal Vance Cordrell, is a fictional composite of the many lawmen who pursued Doolin.
- Randolph Scott portrayed Bill Doolin in the film The Doolins of Oklahoma (1949)
- War hero Audie Murphy played a fictionalized Bill Doolin in the film The Cimarron Kid (1952).
- Leo Gordon portrayed Doolin in a 1954 episode of Jim Davis's syndicated television series, Stories of the Century. The dramatization concludes with Doolin being shot to death after an earlier escape. Heck Thomas in Stories of the Century is referred to as Deputy Marshal Gleason, played by Kenneth MacDonald.
- In the TV movie You Know My Name, Marshal Bill Tilghman, played by Sam Elliott, tells his sons how he arrested Doolin, who is played by James Baker.
- The Eagles album Desperado contains two tracks titled "Doolin-Dalton" and one named "Bitter Creek". The album is loosely themed around the Dalton Gang.
