= Ingalls, Oklahoma =

- Census-designated place
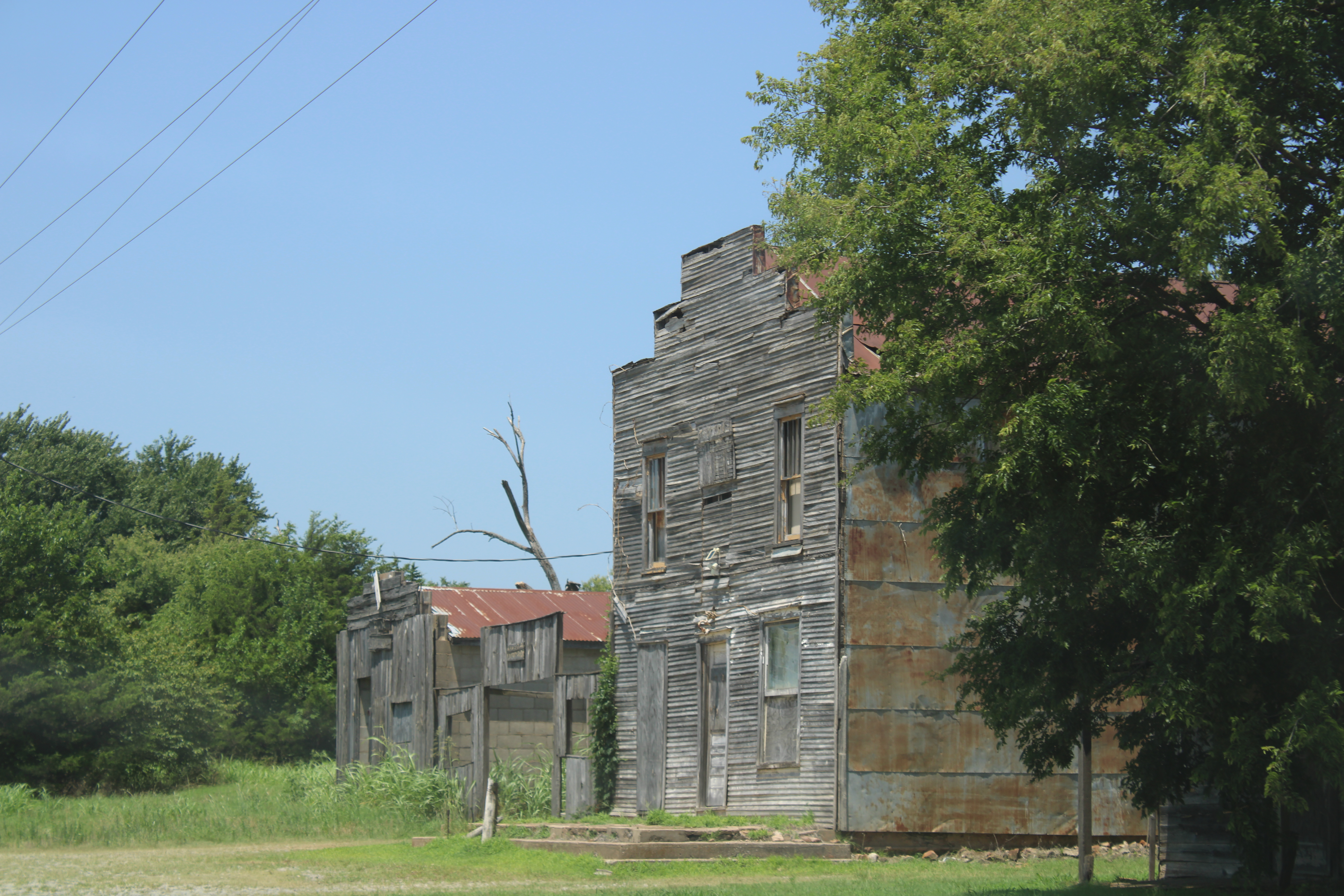

- Location within the state of Oklahoma Ingalls (the United States)
- Coordinates: 36°6′6″N 96°52′53″W
- Country: United States
- State: Oklahoma
- County: Payne
- Established: January 22, 1890

Government

Area
  - Total: 2.59 sq mi (6.72 km^{2})
  - Land: 2.59 sq mi (6.72 km^{2})
  - Water: 0 sq mi (0.00 km^{2})
- Elevation: 919 ft (280 m)

Population (2020)
  - Total: 192
  - Density: 74.0/sq mi (28.59/km^{2})
- Time zone: UTC-6 (Central (CST))
  - Summer (DST): UTC-5 (CDT)
- ZIP codes: 74074
- Area code: 405
- FIPS code: 40-37000
- GNIS feature ID: 2805329

Ingalls is a census-designated place (CDP) in eastern Payne County, Oklahoma, about 9 miles (14 km) east of Stillwater. As of the 2020 census, Ingalls had a population of 192. The town was settled as a result of the "Unassigned Lands" land run in 1889, and had a post office from January 22, 1890, until October 31, 1907. It was named for Senator John J. Ingalls of Kansas, who was instrumental in passing legislation to open the run. Around 1893, the population peaked at about 150, then began to decline by 1900.

== History ==
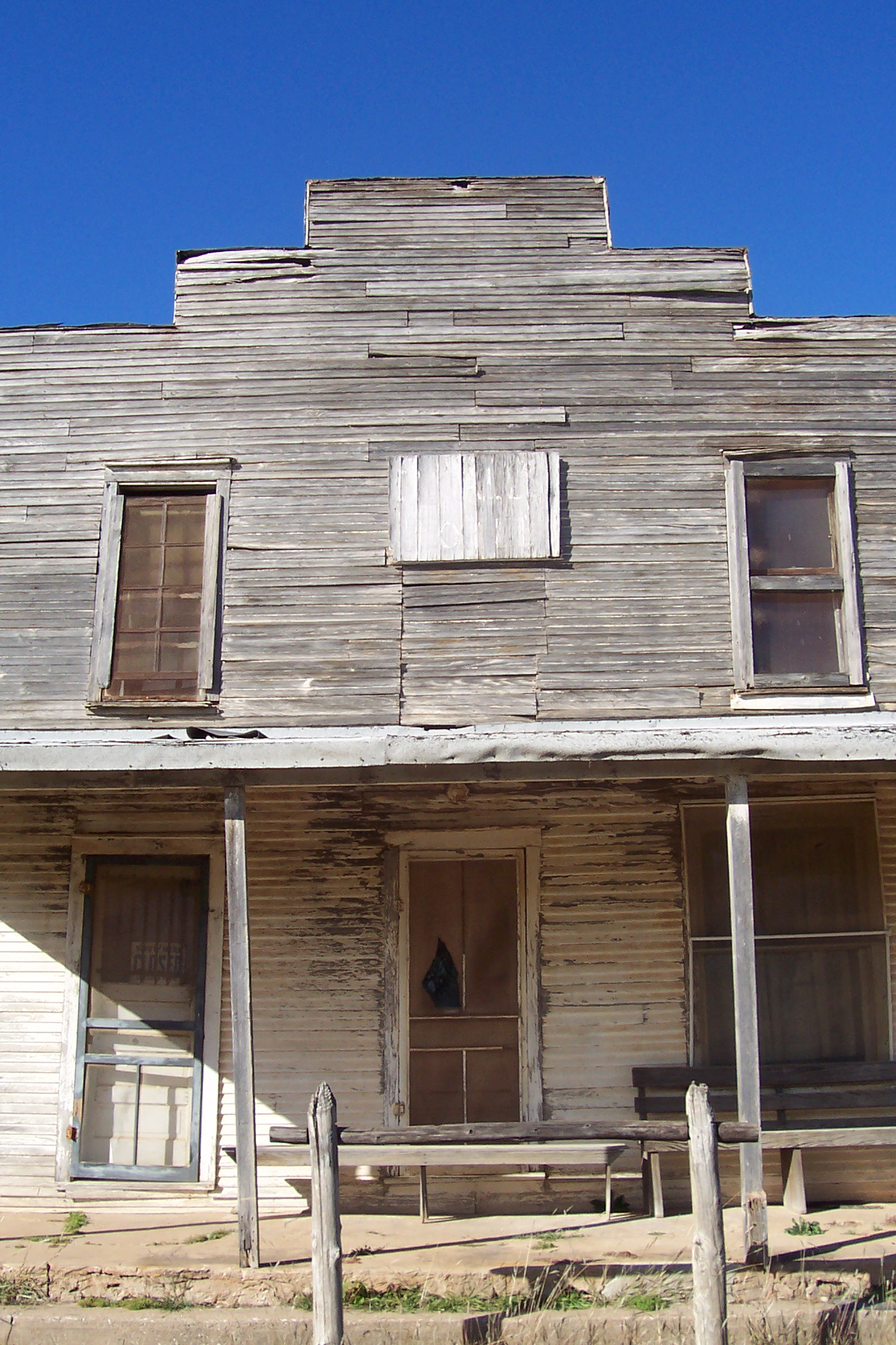
Ingalls Hotel, E 19th Street (2007)

Ingalls was a peaceful community that rarely ever had any commotion, until it became notable as the site of the Battle of Ingalls on September 1, 1893, which was a shootout between U.S. Marshals and the Doolin-Dalton gang. Because of this, many residents abandoned the site, claiming it would never live down its so-called reputation for harboring criminals.

During the oil boom in Payne County, oil was discovered on March 12, 1920, by the Mul-Berry Oil Co. on a well just east of the town. Oil was struck at just 3,000 feet, and produced 50 to 100 barrels a day. By June, Ingalls was predicted to be a major producer of oil. This breathed new life into the town.

Due to this activity, a new post office, named Signet, was established on a site slightly northwest of the old Ingalls townsite on June 21, 1921, and became part of a new community. The residents of the Ingalls part heavily protested, but the government refused to yield.

This new era of Ingalls ended as quick as it began. Oil production had declined rapidly by 1925, and residents followed the activity into other areas. By 1935, a majority of the population and businesses were gone, and the Signet post office was closed on April 30, 1935. The only positive this brought was that the few residents left changed the name back to Ingalls. Another tough blow came when Highways 51 and 108 were laid, and bypassed Ingalls completely by one mile and 1 1/2 miles, respectively.

Today, only a few old buildings from the town's past life are still present on the Signet site. These include the Ingalls Hotel, which was run during the oil boom to house nearby oilfield workers, and a grocery store. Both buildings, in addition to two new ones, were used as replicas of the Pierce O.K. Hotel, Murray Saloon, Ransom Livery Stable, and Wilson General Store. They were used in reenactments of the Battle annually on September 1, until 2011, when the actors retired. On the original site, a community building stands that served as the Ingalls School in the mid-20th century, a stone monument to the US Marshals involved in the Battle stands at Ash Street, and there are many homes new and old that house families who've had ties to the community for generations.

In 1901, the Pierce O.K. Hotel was dismantled into sections and moved to nearby Stillwater. Placed in the 500 block of South Main, it was renamed the Globe Hotel and served as a hotel, apartment house, and later a private residence. In 1937, it was again moved to 812 S. Hester and remodeled into a two-story apartment house. It remains at 812 S. Hester and is the only known building that survives from the original shootout.

== Demographics ==
Historical population
Census	Pop.	Note	%±
2020	192		—
U.S. Decennial Census

=== 2020 census ===
As of the 2020 census, Ingalls had a population of 192. The median age was 46.0 years. 19.8% of residents were under the age of 18 and 13.0% of residents were 65 years of age or older. For every 100 females there were 97.9 males, and for every 100 females age 18 and over there were 105.3 males age 18 and over.

0.0% of residents lived in urban areas, while 100.0% lived in rural areas.

There were 77 households in Ingalls, of which 33.8% had children under the age of 18 living in them. Of all households, 51.9% were married-couple households, 16.9% were households with a male householder and no spouse or partner present, and 18.2% were households with a female householder and no spouse or partner present. About 28.6% of all households were made up of individuals and 6.5% had someone living alone who was 65 years of age or older.

There were 79 housing units, of which 2.5% were vacant. The homeowner vacancy rate was 0.0% and the rental vacancy rate was 0.0%.

Racial composition as of the 2020 census
Race	Number	Percent
White	151	78.6%
Black or African American	0	0.0%
American Indian and Alaska Native	7	3.6%
Asian	0	0.0%
Native Hawaiian and Other Pacific Islander	0	0.0%
Some other race	0	0.0%
Two or more races	34	17.7%
Hispanic or Latino (of any race)	12	6.2%

== Sources ==
- McRill, Leslie. "Old Ingalls: The Story of a Town That Will Not Die", Chronicles of Oklahoma 36:4 (October 1958) 429-445 (retrieved August 17, 2006)
- "Oklahoma's Past: Payne County" Oklahoma Archaeological Survey. University of Oklahoma. 23 Oct 2007.
- Shirley, Glenn (July 1990). Gunfight at Ingalls: Death of an Outlaw Town. Barbed Wire Pr. p. 180. ISBN 978-0935269062.
- Newsom, D. Earl. The Story of Exciting Payne County. New Forums Pr. p. 185-192. ISBN 0-913507-91-1
