= List of Old West gunfighters =

This is a list of Old West gunfighters, referring to outlaws or lawmen, of the American frontier who gained fame or notoriety during the American Wild West or Old West. Some listed were never gunfighters. The term gunslinger is a modern, 20th-century invention, often used in cinema or other media to refer to men in the American Old West who had gained a reputation as being dangerous with a gun. A gunfighter may or may not be an outlaw or a lawman. An outlaw had usually been convicted of a crime, such as Black Bart, but may have only gained a reputation as operating outside the law, such as Ike Clanton. Some of those listed may have also served in law enforcement, like Marshal Burt Alvord who subsequently became an outlaw, and some outlaws like Johnny Ringo were deputized at one time or another. Some of the gunfighters listed included professionals, scouts, businessmen, and even doctors.

== Outlaws ==
The majority of outlaws in the Old West preyed on banks, trains, and stagecoaches. Some crimes were carried out by Mexicans and Native Americans against white citizens who were targets of opportunity along the U.S.–Mexico border, particularly in Texas, New Mexico, Arizona, and California.

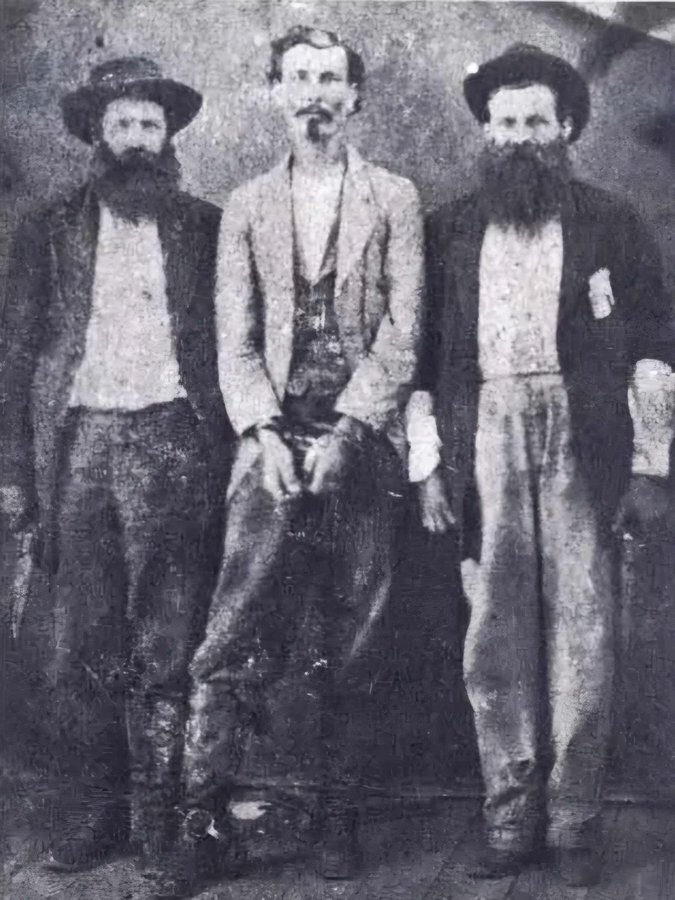
A handcuffed William Longley (center)

For example, Pancho Villa was a bandit from Durango, Mexico who also conducted cross-border raids into New Mexico and Texas. Some individuals, like Jesse James, became outlaws after serving in the Civil War. Some were simply men who took advantage of the wildness and lawlessness of the frontier to enrich themselves at the expense of others. Some outlaws migrated to the frontier to escape prosecution for crimes elsewhere.

== Lawmen ==
Law was present, if spread thin, in the American Old West. It was usually present on three levels: the Deputy U.S. Marshal, the county sheriff, and the town marshal or constable. Sometimes their jurisdictions overlapped which could lead to conflicts like those between Deputy U.S. Marshal Virgil Earp and Cochise County, Arizona Sheriff Johnny Behan. When an outlaw committed a crime, the local sheriff or marshal would usually form a posse to attempt to capture them. Rewards were posted for outlaws which encouraged citizens to capture or kill them for the reward, leading to the profession of bounty hunter – people who would find and capture/kill those with a bounty placed on their head by the law.

== A ==
- John Hicks Adams (1820–1878)
- Robert Clay Allison (1841–1887)
- Burt Alvord (1867–1910)
- Charlie Anderson (1844–1868)
- David L. "Billy Wilson" Anderson (1862–1918)
- Hugh Anderson (1851–1873 or 1914?)

== B ==
- Elfego Baca (1865–1945)
- Cullen Baker (1835–1869)
- Richard H. "Rattlesnake Dick" Barter (1833–1859)
- Sam Bass (1851–1878)
- Tom Bell (1825–1856)
- Jules Beni (??–1861)
- John Billee (1873–1890)
- William "Tulsa Jack" Blake (c.1859–1895)
- Thomas Hamilton Blanek (1861–1895)
- Dan Bogan (1860–??)
- William H. "Billy the Kid" Bonney (1859–1881)
- N. K. Boswell (1836–1921)
- Joaquin Botellier (??–??) (member of the Five Joaquins gang)
- Charlie Bowdre (1848–1880)
- William Brazelton (?–1878)
- Richard M. "Dick" Brewer (1850–1878)
- William "Curly Bill" Brocius (1845–1882)
- James Brooks (1855–1944)
- William L. "Buffalo Bill" Brooks (c. 1832 – 1874)
- Henry Newton Brown (1857–1884)
- Sam Brown (outlaw) (1831–1861)
- Roscoe Bryant (??–1878)
- Rufus Buck (1877–1896)
- John Bull (1836–1929)
- Seth Bullock (Marshal) (1849–1919)
- Frederick Russell Burnham (1861–1947)
- Reuben "Rube" Burrow (1854–1890)

== C ==
- Frank M. Canton (a.k.a. Josiah Horner) (1849–1927)
- "Laughing" Sam Carey (a.k.a. Laughing Dick Carey) (??–??)
- Tom Carberry (??–??)
- Joaquin Carrillo (??–??) (member of the Five Joaquins gang)
- William "News" Carver (1868–1901)
- Butch Cassidy (1866–1908)
- Jose Chavez y Chavez (1851–1924)
- Ned Christie (1852–1892)
- Billy Claiborne (1860–1882)
- Billy Clanton (1862–1881)
- Ike Clanton (1847–1887)
- Phineas Clanton (1843–1906)
- Archie Clement (1846–1866)
- "Dynamite" Dan Clifton (1865–1896)
- Theodore Clifton (1844–1868)
- Frank Coe (1851–1931)
- George Coe (1856–1941)
- Chunk Colbert (??–1874)
- "Shotgun" John Collins (1851–1922)
- George Contant (1864–?1930), brother of John Sontag
- Scott Cooley (1845–1876)
- Brack Cornett (1859–1888)
- Gregorio Cortez (1875–1916)
- Juan Cortina (a.k.a. "The Red Robber of the Rio Grande") (1824–1894)
- "Longhair" Jim Courtright (1848–1887)
- George "Flatnose" Curry (1864–1900) (not to be confused with George Manuse a.k.a. "Big Nose George Parrott")

== D ==
- Bob Dalton (1869–1892)
- Emmett Dalton (1871–1937)
- Frank Dalton (1859–1887)
- Gratton "Grat" Dalton (1861–1892)
- William M. Dalton (1863–1894)
- John Daly (1839–1864)
- Pancho Daniel (??–1858)
- Ben Daniels (1852–1923)
- Roy Daugherty (a.k.a. Arkansas Tom Jones) (1870–1924)
- Jackson "Diamondfield Jack" Davis (1879–1949)
- Jonathan R. Davis (1816 – not before 1887)
- Pat Desmond (1842–1890)
- Charles "Pony" Diehl (1848–1888)
- Bill Doolin (1858–1896)
- Bill Downing (1860–1908)
- Mart Duggan (1848–1888)
- William B. Dunn (??–1896)

== E ==
- Morgan Earp (1851–1882)
- Virgil Earp (1843–1905)
- Warren Earp (1855–1900)
- Wyatt Earp (1848–1929)
- Frank "Pistol Pete" Eaton (1860–1958)
- Buck English (1855–1915)
- Chris Evans (1847–1917)
- Jesse Evans (1853–disappeared 1882)

== F ==
- John Fisher "King" (1853–1884)
- Juan Flores (1834–1857)
- Charles Wilson "Charley" Ford (1857–1884)
- Robert Newton Ford (1862–1892)
- Jim French (??–??)

== G ==
- Patrick Floyd "Pat" Garrett (1850–1908)
- John Joel Glanton (1819–1851)
- Crawford "Cherokee Bill" Goldsby (1876–1896)

== H ==
- John Wesley Hardin (1853–1895)
- Haskay-bay-nay-ntayl "The Apache Kid" (c. 1860 – in or after 1894)
- Marion Hedgepeth (1856–1909)
- Boone Helm (a.k.a. "The Kentucky Cannibal") (1828–1864)
- James "Wild Bill" Hickok (1837–1876)
- John "Pink" Higgins (1848–1914)
- Robert Woodson "Wood" Hite (1850–1881)
- Thomas J. "Tom Bell" Hodges (a.k.a. "The Outlaw Doc") (1825–1856)
- John Henry "Doc" Holliday (1851–1887)
- Tom Horn (1860–1903)
- Jesse Lee Hall (1849–1911)
- John Reynolds Hughes (1855–1947)

== J ==
- Jack McCall (c. 1852/1853–1877)
- Frank Jackson (1856–1930?)
- Frank James (1843–1915)
- Jesse James (1847–1882)
- Henry Jerrell (1845–1868)
- Jack "Turkey Creek" Johnson (c. 1847 – c. 1887)

== K ==
- Thomas "Black Jack" Ketchum (1863–1901)
- Henry "Billy the Kid" McCarty (1859–1881)
- Ben "Tall Texan" Kilpatrick (1874–1912)
- Jeff Kidder (1875–1908)
- Sandy King (1852?–1881)
- John Kinney (1847–1919)

== L ==
- Elzy Lay (1868–1934)
- Kitty Leroy (1850–1877)
- Buckskin Frank Leslie (1842 – after 1920)
- Jim Levy (gunfighter) (1842–1882)
- James Andrew "Dick" Liddil (1852–1901)
- William Sidney "Cap" Light (c. 1863 – 1893)
- Harvey "Kid Curry" Logan (1867–1904)
- " Steve" Long (?–1868)
- Harry "Sundance Kid" Longabaugh (1867–1908)
- "Wild Bill" Longley (1851–1878)
- Frank Loving (1860–1882)

== M ==
- Chris Madsen (1851–1944)
- John Mason (??–1866)
- Bat Masterson (1853–1921)
- Ed Masterson (1852–1878)
- James Masterson (1855–1895)
- Mysterious Dave Mather (1851–1886?)
- Clarence L. Maxwell (1860–1909)
- Benjamin Mayfield (1831–187?)
- Tom McCauley a.k.a. James "Jim" Henry (??–1865)
- Sherman McMaster (1853–1892)
- Frank McNab (??–1878)
- William McWaters (1844–1875)
- Bob Meeks (??–1912?)
- John Middleton (c. 1854 – c. 1885)
- Clell Miller (1849 or 1850 – 1876)
- Jim "Killer" Miller (1866–1909)
- Jeff Davis Milton (1861–1947)
- Ezra Allen Miner “Bill Miner” (1847-1913)
- John J. Moore (1847–1868)
- William C. "Outlaw Bill" Moore (?–?)
- Sylvestro "Pedro" Morales (c.late 1850s–??)
- Burton C. Mossman (1867–1956)
- Joaquin Murrieta (c. 1829–1853)
- L. H. Musgrove (1832–1868)

== N ==
- George "Bittercreek" Newcomb (1866–1895)

== O ==
- Joaquin Ocomorenia (a.k.a. Jesus Valenzuela; member of the Five Joaquins gang)
- Lon Oden (1863–1910)
- Tom O'Folliard (c. 1858–1880)
- Edward Capehart O'Kelley (1858–1904)
- Michael "Johnny Behind the Deuce" O'Rourke (1862–1882)
- Commodore Perry Owens (1852–1919)

== P ==
- Langford M. Peel (1829/1831 – 1867)
- Tom Pickett (1858–1934)
- Salomon Pico (1821–1860)
- Charley Pierce (c. 1866 – 1895)
- Thomas Bell Poole (1818–1865)
- Jack Powers (1827–1860)
- Procopio (c. 1841 – c. 1882)
- George Parrott, a.k.a. Big Nose George (1834–1881)

== Q ==
- Queho (1880 – c. 1930s)

== R ==
- "Little Bill" Raidler (1870?–1904)
- James C. Reed (1845–1874), husband of Belle Starr
- Nathanial "Texas Jack" Reed (1862–1950)
- Bass Reeves deputy U.S. Marshal (1832–1910)
- Frank H. Reid (1844–1898)
- Frank Reno (1837–1868)
- Simeon Reno (1843–1868)
- William Reno (1848–1868)
- Levi Richardson (1851–1879)
- James "Jim" Riley (1853–??)
- Johnny Ringo (1850–1882)
- Buckshot Roberts (1831–1878)
- Porter Rockwell (1813–1878)
- Charles Roseberry (1843–1868)
- Dave Rudabaugh (1854–1886)
- Charles and John D. Ruggles (died 1892) – the "Ruggles Brothers"

== S ==
- Yginio Salazar (1863–1936)
- Ab Saunders (1851–1883)
- George Scarborough (1859–1900)
- Doc Scurlock (1849–1929)
- John Selman (1839–1896)
- Luke Short (1854–1893)
- Cyrus Skinner (??–1864)
- Jack Slade (1831–1864)
- Origen Charles "Hairlip Charlie" Smith (1844–1907)
- Jefferson Randolph "Soapy Smith" Smith (1860–1898)
- Thomas J. Smith (1830–1870)
- John Sontag (1861–1893)
- Frank Sparks (1841–1868)
- Pete Spence (1852–1914)
- "Little Bill" Standifer (1853–1903)
- Henry Starr (1873–1921)
- Tom "Uncle Tom" Starr (1813–1890)
- Frank Stilwell (c 1856–1882)
- Ernest St. Leon (??–1898)
- Charlie Storms (1822–1881)
- Dallas Stoudenmire (1845–1882)

== T ==
- William "Russian Bill" Tattenbaum (1853–1881)
- Jack Taylor (1884–1887)
- Heck Thomas (1850–1912)
- Ben Thompson (1843–1884)
- Billy Thompson (1845–1897)
- Tom Threepersons (1889—1969)
- Bill Tilghman (1854–1924)
- Harry Tracy (1875–1902)
- Dangerous Dan Tucker (1849–after 1892)

== V ==
- Joaquin Valenzuela (c. 1820 – died 1853 or 1858?) (member of the Five Joaquins gang)
- Tiburcio Vasquez (1835–1875)
- Henry Clay "Hank" Vaughan (1849–1893)
- "Texas" Jack Vermillion (1842–1911)
- José Doroteo "Pancho Villa" Arango Arámbula (1878–1923)

== W ==
- Fred Waite (1853–1895)
- George "Red Buck" Weightman (1850—1895)
- William "Bronco Bill" Walters (1869–1921)
- John Joshua Webb (1847–1882)
- Richard "Little Dick" West (1860–1898)
- Harry C. Wheeler (1875–1925)

== Y ==
- Oliver "Ol" Yantis (1869–1892)
- Milt Yarberry (1849–1883)
- Bob Younger (1853–1889)
- Cole Younger (1844–1916)
- Jim Younger (1848–1902)
- John Younger (1851–1874)

== See also ==
- List of cowboys and cowgirls
- List of Old West lawmen
- List of Old West gangs
