= Marion Hedgepeth =

American outlaw

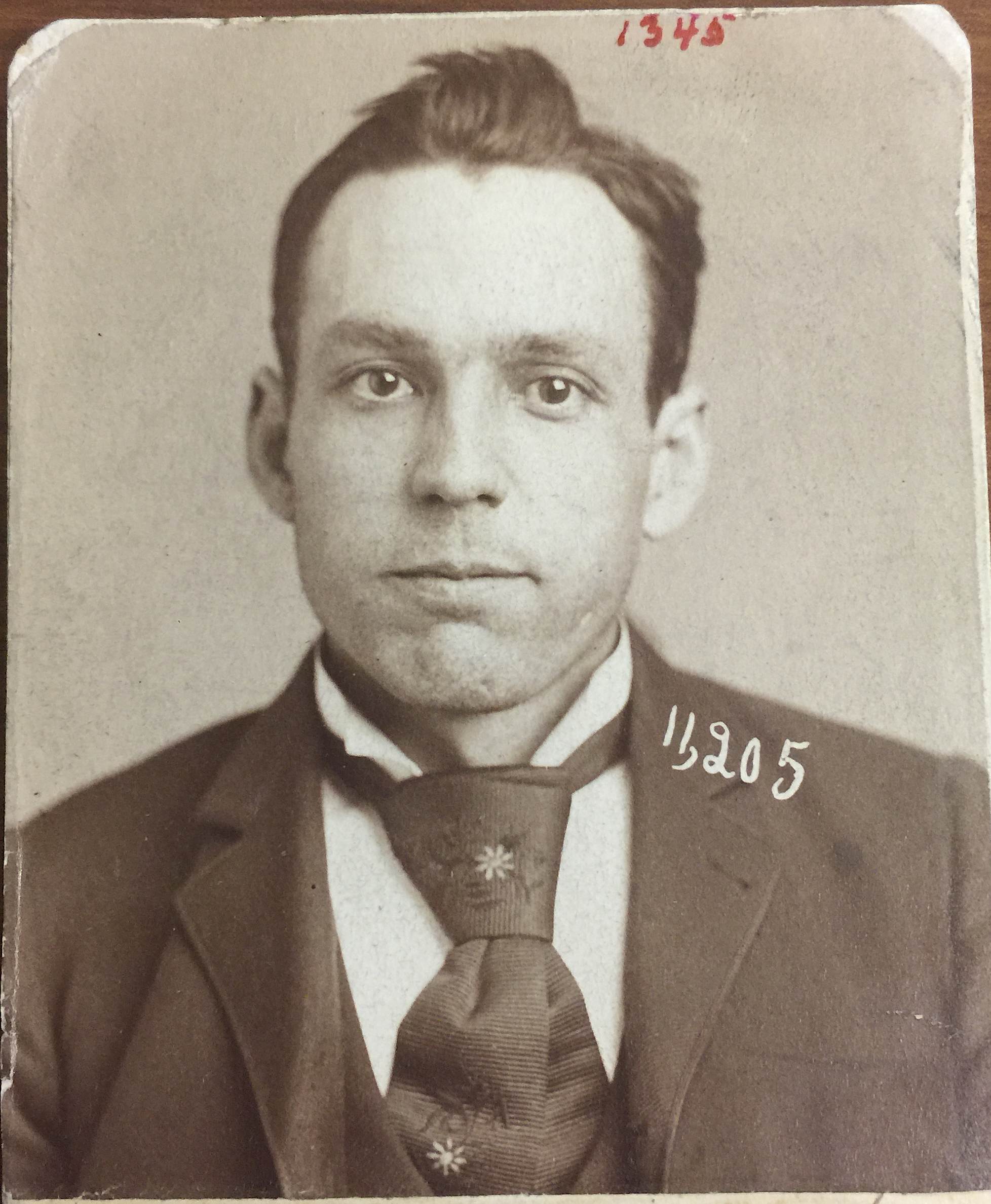
- Hedgepeth's February 1892 arrest photo
- Born: Marion Columbus Hedgepeth; October 1864; Prairie Home, Missouri, U.S.
- Died: December 31, 1909 (aged 45); Chicago, Illinois, U.S.
- Cause of death: Gunshot wound
- Other names: The Handsome Bandit; Debonair Bandit; Derby Kid; Montana Bandit
- Convictions: Larceny, jail breaking, armed robbery

Details
- Victims: 2+
- Country: United States
- States: Colorado, Wyoming, California, Missouri

Marion Columbus Hedgepeth (October 1864 – December 31, 1909) – also known as the Handsome Bandit, the Debonair Bandit, the Derby Kid and the Montana Bandit – was a famous Wild West outlaw.

== Early life ==
Hedgepeth was born near Prairie Home, Missouri, in October 1864, although his date of birth has erroneously been given as April 14, 1856. He allegedly ran away from home at age 15, worked as a cowboy, and was an outlaw by the time he was 20, having killed in Colorado and Wyoming, as well as having robbed trains.

== Appearance and reputation ==
In a 1996 American Cowboy article titled "The Debonair Killer", David P. Grady noted: "Marion Hedgepeth looked like a dude, but 'dangerous' and 'deadly' fit him better". The dark-complexioned, wavy-haired six footer, who roamed from town to town as a hired gun, Grady wrote, maintained the fastidious, gentlemanly appearance of a dandy, sporting a bowler hat and diamond stickpin. WANTED posters noted that his shoes were usually polished.

An article published in the Express Gazette, Volume 20 by "a man from Missouri", who described himself as "a disinterested student of train robbing", indicated that appearances were strategically important to Marion and his crew. In preparation for the Glendale robbery, he noted, Hedgepeth, "his three pals" and his wife "assembled in that city and rented a house in a fashionable quarter of the town. They furnished the house well, and during the two or three weeks prior to the holdup, each robber purchased for himself swell attire piece by piece, so as not to attract attention."

Despite his swell appearance, however, Hedgepeth "was a deadly killer and one of the fastest guns in the Wild, Wild West". Allan Pinkerton, whose National Detective Agency had sought to capture Hedgepeth and his gang for years, noted that Marion Hedgepeth once gunned down another outlaw who had already unholstered his pistol before Hedgepeth had drawn his revolver.

== Criminal career and consequences ==
Hedgepeth was arrested at the age of 15 after he and Henry Sanders robbed the general store in Prairie Home in 1880. In November 1883, he was sentenced to serve a term of seven years in the Missouri State Penitentiary in Jefferson City, Missouri, on the charges of larceny and jail breaking. He was discharged on February 16, 1889.

Hedgepeth lived for a while in a lawless region of Kansas City, Missouri, an area known as "Seldom Seen" because the police were seldom seen there. He became a member of the "famous Slye-Wilson gang of safe blowers and highwaymen".

On November 30, 1891, Hedgepeth and the other members of Slye-Wilson gang (Adelbert Denton "Bertie" Slye, James "Illinois Jimmy" Francis and Lucius "Dink" Wilson) – which later came to be referred to as the "Hedgepeth Four" – robbed a train of $20,000 in Glendale, Missouri, near St. Louis, Missouri. The gang fled to Salt Lake City and disbanded. After being relentlessly pursued by the Pinkertons, he was finally arrested on February 10, 1892, in San Francisco and brought back to Missouri for trial. Convicted, he was sentenced in 1893 to 25 years in the Missouri State Penitentiary. Before being sent to the state prison, Hedgepeth informed on a former cellmate, whom he knew as "H.M. Howard" but was really Herman Webster Mudgett, better known as H. H. Holmes, which eventually resulted in the notorious killer's unmasking, conviction and execution in 1896. For this and other considerations, Hedgepeth was pardoned by Missouri state governor Joseph W. Folk 14 years into his 25-year term. He was released sick with tuberculosis and "looked like a skeleton and appeared 60 years old."

He was arrested in 1907 in Omaha, for the burglary of a storage house at Council Bluffs, Iowa. He was convicted and sent to the Iowa State Penitentiary in Fort Madison, Iowa in March 1908, and upon appeal was released after serving one year.

Hedgepeth was shot and killed by Edward Jaburek on December 31, 1909, during a botched Chicago saloon robbery at 18th and Avers Avenue. He died at St. Anthony's Hospital and was buried in the Cook County Cemetery on the grounds of the Cook County Poor Farm at Dunning.

The fates of the other three members of the "Hedgepeth four" were:

- Adelbert Slye was arrested in Los Angeles, California; he pleaded guilty and received a twenty-year sentence
- James Francis killed Fort Scott, Kansas, policeman S.B. McLemore on January 23, 1892, and was killed in Pleasanton, Kansas
- Lucius Wilson was involved in the killing of Syracuse, New York, Detective James A. Harvey on August 1, 1893, and was arrested; he was executed May 14, 1894
