= N.K. Boswell Ranch =

- N. K. Boswell Ranch
- U.S. National Register of Historic Places
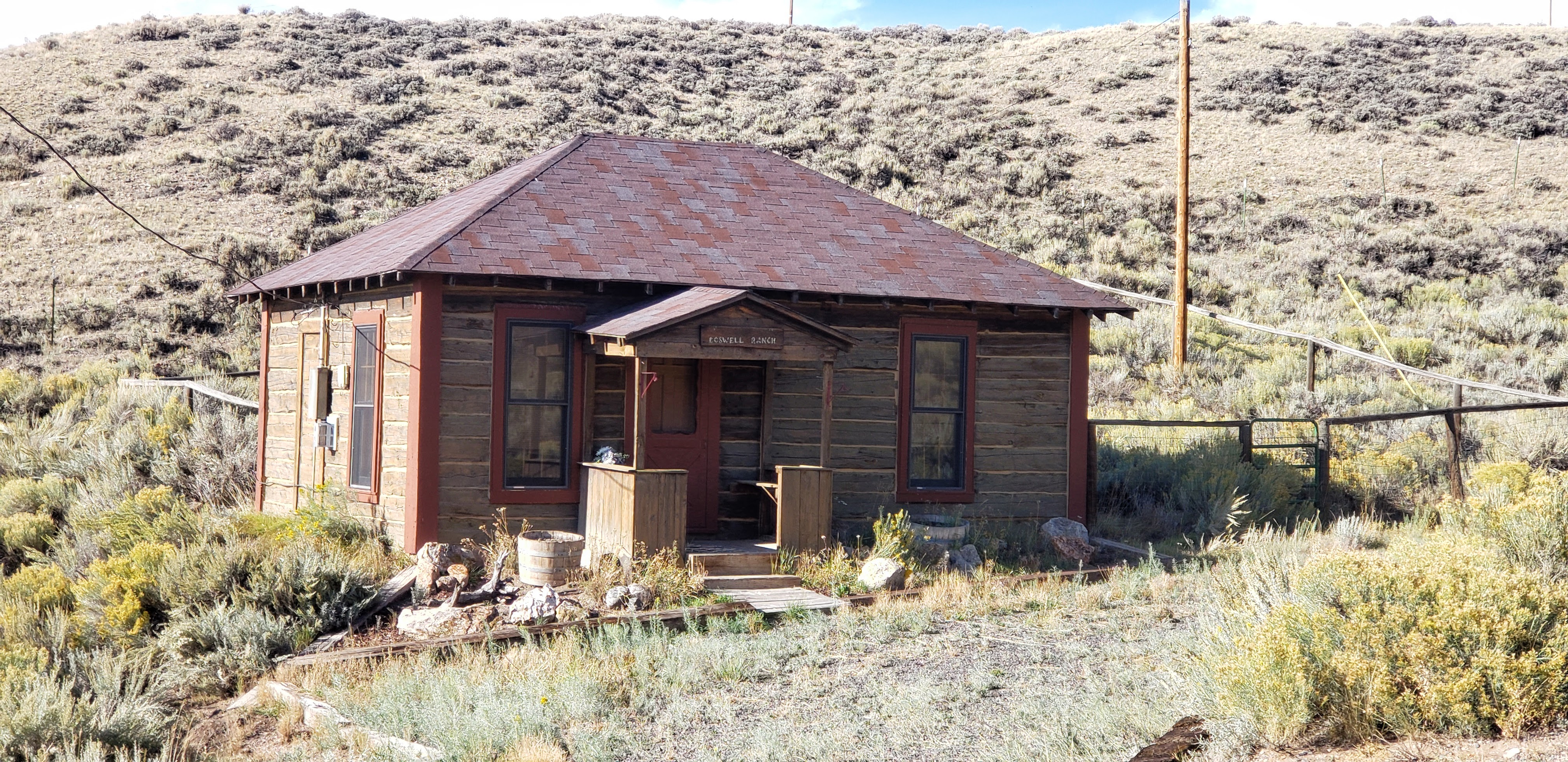

- Location within Wyoming Location within the United States
- Nearest city: Woods Landing, Wyoming
- Coordinates: 41°00′07″N 106°00′51″W
- Area: 1,768 acres (715 ha)
- Architectural style: Log Cabin style
- NRHP reference No.: 77001381
- Added to NRHP: July 21, 1977

The N.K. Boswell Ranch is one of the oldest ranches on the edge of the Laramie Plains along the Big Laramie River in Albany County, Wyoming, USA. The ranch was established in the early 1870s, possibly by a man named C.T. Waldron. The ranch is significant for its association with Nathaniel K. Boswell, who was Albany County Sheriff at a time when the county extended from Colorado to Montana.

== Description ==
The ranch lies in a valley on the east side of the Medicine Bow Mountains, with 1,768 acres (715 ha) of deeded land and 3,000 acres (1,200 ha) of leased land. The historical portion of the ranch headquarters comprises a 1 1/2-story log ranch house, a log shed, three log cabins, two wood-frame sheds and a series of log corrals. The ranch house dates to about 1873, and one log cabin is dated to 1894. Across the access road are a series of log and frame ranch buildings, including barns, a bunkhouse, a workshop, several sheds and two privies.

== History ==
Established in the 1870s by an obscure series of settlers, the ranch is a representative example of a moderate-sized working ranch. It was also a stopping point on the North Park-Laramie Plains Road. In 1886 Nathaniel K. Boswell acquired a part-interest in the ranch. Boswell was a prominent citizen in southeastern Wyoming during the late 19th century. Boswell, originally from New Hampshire, was established in Cheyenne by 1867, and in 1868 he is described as working in law enforcement in an "unofficial capacity." His activities on a vigilance committee led to more formal employment, and he became Albany County Sheriff in 1869. Bowell also acted as a private detective, and in 1873 was the first warden of the Wyoming Territorial Penitentiary. In 1903 Boswell rode over the Laramie Mountains with Theodore Roosevelt. He was also a friend of writer Bill Nye. Boswell died in 1921. The ranch changed hands several times after his death.

The N.K. Bowell Ranch was listed on the National Register of Historic Places on July 21, 1977.
