= Horrell Brothers =

Outlaws of the Old West (c. 1873–1878)

Horrell brothers
- Born: Mart, Tom, Merritt, Ben, and Sam Horrell
- Died: Ben: December 1873 in Lincoln, New Mexico Territory; Merritt: January 22, 1877 in Lampasas County, Texas; Mart: December 15, 1878 in Meridian, Texas; Tom: December 15, 1878 in Meridian, Texas; Sam: 1936 in California
- Cause of death: Ben, Merritt, Mart, and Tom were shot
- Years active: 1873-1878
- Known for: Horrell-Higgins feud
- Motive: Racism against Hispanic people

Details
- Country: United States
- Locations: Texas, New Mexico Territory
- Target: Hispanic people
- Killed: 18+
- Weapons: Guns

The Horrell brothers, sometimes referred to as the lawless Horrell boys (circa 1873–1878), were five brothers from the Horrell family of Lampasas County, Texas, who were outlaws of the Old West, and who committed numerous murders over a five-year period before four of the brothers were killed in different incidents. The brothers are probably best known for the Horrell-Higgins feud, although it resulted in relatively few deaths compared to other feuds. However, starting in 1873, the brothers went on an ethnically motivated killing spree during which they killed a Hispanic lawman and a white lawman in New Mexico, killed 11 other Hispanic men, and wounded one Hispanic woman. The brothers had previously killed five lawmen in Texas.

== Background ==
Lampasas County, Texas, highlighting the city of Lampasas

The Horrell and Higgins families had both settled in the Lampasas County area several years before the American Civil War. By all accounts, the two families got along well for over a decade. However, by the early 1870s, the Horrell boys (Mart, Tom, Merritt, Ben, and Sam) were involved in numerous lawless activities. In January 1873, Lampasas County Sheriff Shadrick T. Denson attempted to arrest two brothers, Wash and Mark Short, but was impeded by the Horrell brothers, which resulted in a gunfight with Sheriff Denson being shot, but he did recover. The county judge appealed to Governor Edmund J. Davis for help. This prompted the Texas State Police to dispatch a number of lawmen to settle things down.

== Saloon gunfight ==
On February 10, 1873, Governor Davis issued an order prohibiting the carrying of firearms inside the town limits of Lampasas, Texas. Seven state police arrived shortly thereafter, under the command of Captain Thomas Williams. On March 14, 1873, state officers Wesley Cherry, Jim Daniels, and Andrew Melville arrested Bill Bowen, a brother-in-law to the Horrell brothers, for carrying a firearm. The officers then entered Jerry Scott's Saloon with Bowen in tow. After a verbal exchange with the Horrell brothers, who were inside the saloon, a gunfight ensued, leaving four officers dead, including Captain Williams. Captain Williams shot and badly wounded Mart Horrell, and Tom Horrell was also wounded.

== Killing spree ==
Following the gunfight, several more state police were sent to the county. Mart Horrell and three friends were quickly arrested and taken to the Georgetown, Texas jail. However more than 30 friends soon broke into the jail and freed them. The brothers fled to Lincoln County in the New Mexico Territory, where Ben Horrell quickly befriended Lincoln County Sheriff Jack Gylam. On December 1, 1873, Sheriff Gylam and Ben Horrell rode into the town of Lincoln and began drinking, visiting several brothels and saloons before discharging their firearms in the street while drunk. Constable Juan Martínez demanded they turn over their weapons, and they complied but were not arrested. Soon afterward, they had acquired more pistols and were again shooting, this time inside a brothel. When confronted by Constable Martínez yet again, Ben Horrell shot and killed Martínez; Horrell and Gylam fled. Other lawmen caught up with them before they were able to leave town and killed them both.

The Horrell brothers retaliated by killing two prominent Mexican ranchers, resulting in newly appointed Sheriff Alexander Hamilton Mills gathering a posse and hunting them down. After an intense standoff outside Lincoln, the posse retreated and the brothers escaped. On December 20, 1873, the brothers stormed a Hispanic celebration in Lincoln, killing four Hispanic men and wounding one Hispanic woman. Again they were pursued, but evaded capture. Shortly afterward, Edward "Little" Hart, a friend to the Horrell brothers, shot and killed Deputy Sheriff Joseph Haskins due to the latter having married a Hispanic woman. Less than a week later, the brothers and their friends came into contact with freight wagons just outside Roswell, New Mexico, maintained by five Hispanic men, all of whom were killed by the brothers.

== Feud begins ==
By early February 1874, the brothers had returned to Lampasas, but found they were no longer welcome and no longer viewed as fun-loving cowboys, but instead as outlaws. The brothers were arrested for the murders of the lawmen in Lampasas, but due to a local jury hearing the case, they were acquitted. Shortly after their acquittal, John "Pink" Higgins accused the Horrell brothers of cattle rustling. The brothers were arrested, but again due mostly to a local jury hearing the case, they were acquitted. Although things were tense between the two families, no actions were taken by either side until January 22, 1877. On that day, while in the Wiley and Toland's Gem Saloon in Lampasas, John Higgins shot and killed Merritt Horrell in a gunfight.

The three remaining Horrell brothers vowed they would take revenge against John Higgins, his brother-in-law Bob Mitchell, and friend Bill Wren, voicing this publicly on several occasions. On March 26, 1877, Tom and Mart Horrell were shot and wounded during an ambush, but both survived. John Higgins and Bob Mitchell were being sought for the Merritt Horrell gunfight, and both surrendered shortly after the ambush to Texas Ranger Captain John Sparks, best known for his earlier 1876 capture of gunman Billy Thompson. Both men posted a $10,000 bond and were released. The local courthouse was burglarized shortly thereafter, with several records stolen, including their bonds. The shooting of Merritt Horrell was later ruled to have been self defense, and the charges were dropped.

== Town square shootout ==
On June 7, 1877, John Higgins, in-laws Bob Mitchell and (William) Frank Mitchell, Bill Wren, and another brother-in-law, Ben Terry, rode into Lampasas. The Horrell brothers and several friends were already in town that day, gathered at the square. Who fired first is unknown, but it is believed that someone within the Horrell faction opened fire on the Higgins faction. When it was over, Bill Wren had been wounded, Frank Mitchell had been killed, and Horrell faction members Buck Waltrup and Carson Graham were dead.

Texas Rangers descended on the town only days later. All three Horrell brothers were arrested, and Texas Ranger Major John B. Jones acted as a mediator between the two sides to calm matters. Less than one year later, Mart and Tom Horrell were arrested in Meridian, Texas, for armed robbery and murder. While confined to the local jail on December 15, 1878, vigilantes broke in and shot them both, killing them. They were buried in an unmarked grave at Oak Cemetery, Lampasas Texas. Although never proven, John Higgins likely instigated the murders. Sam Horrell was now the only remaining Horrell brother. He moved his family to Oregon in 1882, then later to California. He died there in 1936 and is buried in Eureka.

John Higgins was viewed as a hero locally, and is often credited with bringing down the Horrell brothers. He later worked as a range detective and developed a considerable reputation as a gunman. In September 1877, Higgins killed cowboy Ike Lantier, whom he caught stealing cattle, after Lantier drew a gun on him. That shooting was ruled self defense. On October 4, 1903, he killed gunman and former lawman, Bill Standifer, in a gunfight after Standifer had threatened Higgins' son Cullen, a local district attorney. Higgins died on December 18, 1914. At the time of his death, Higgins is believed to have killed 14 men in gunfights.
