= John Higgins (gunman) =

American cowboy (1851–1913)

John Pinckney Calhoun Higgins, better known as "Pink" Higgins (March 28, 1851 – December 18, 1913), was a gunman and cowboy of the Old West. He is known to have killed 14 men in his lifetime.

== Early life ==
Pink Higgins was born in Macon, Georgia. He acquired the nickname "Pink" at an early age, due to his first middle name. His mother and father moved from Georgia to Texas shortly after he was born, specifically to Lampasas County.

Higgins began taking part in cattle drives north into Kansas while a teenager working on his father's ranch. He was too young to serve during the American Civil War and remained in Lampasas County working as a cowboy for most of his youth. During that time, he took part in numerous skirmishes with hostile Indians and in the hanging of several cattle rustlers. He was an active member of what was known as the Law and Order League, organized to battle horse thieves, cattle thieves, and other outlaws.

== Horrell-Higgins feud ==
His reputation as a gunman began during the mid-1870s, when the Horrell Brothers (Mart, Tom, Merritt, Ben, and Sam) went on a killing spree in Lincoln County, New Mexico, after killing five lawmen in Lampasas, Texas. Ben Horrell was killed by lawmen in New Mexico Territory, and the other four brothers returned to Texas. In May 1876, Higgins swore out an arrest warrant for the four Horrell brothers, accusing them of rustling his cattle. The brothers were acquitted, however, due mostly to a local jury hearing the case. This started what would later be referred to as the "Horrell-Higgins Feud." Despite the name, Pink Higgins was the only Higgins involved in this family feud.

On January 22, 1877, Merritt Horrell began to goad Higgins while in the Wiley and Toland's Gem Saloon. Higgins was angry already because of the acquittal of the brothers. This resulted in the two men engaging in a gunfight where Merritt Horrell was killed. The three remaining brothers spread word around town that they intended to retaliate against Higgins, as well as his brother-in-law Bob Mitchell and friend Bill Wren. On March 26, 1877, Tom and Mart Horrell were ambushed outside of Lampasas; both were wounded but survived. Higgins was implicated, but it was never proven. In May 1877, Higgins and Bob Mitchell were being sought in the killing of Merritt Horrell. The two surrendered to Texas Ranger John Stark, best known for his capture of gunman Billy Thompson the year before. Both posted bond and were released. Eventually, that shooting was ruled as having been in self-defense.

On June 7, 1877, Pink Higgins' in-laws Bob Mitchell and (William) Frank Mitchell, Bill Wren, and another brother-in-law named Ben Terry rode into Lampasas. The Horrell brothers and several friends were already in town that day, gathered at the square. It is not known who fired first, but it is believed that someone within the Horrell faction opened fire on the Higgins faction. When it was over, Bill Wren had been wounded, Frank Mitchell had been killed, and Horrell faction members Buck Waltrup and Carson Graham were dead.

Texas Rangers descended on the town only days later. All three Horrell brothers were arrested, and Texas Ranger Major John B. Jones acted as a mediator between the two sides to calm matters. Less than one year later, Mart and Tom Horrell were arrested in Meridian, Texas, for armed robbery and murder. While confined to the local jail, vigilantes broke in and shot them both, killing them. It was speculated—though never proven—that Pink Higgins instigated the murders. This effectively ended the feud. Sam Horrell was now the only remaining Horrell brother. He moved his family to Oregon in 1882, then later to California. He died there in 1932. Higgins remained in Lampasas County, and in September 1877, cowboy Ike Lantier was caught by Higgins stealing cattle. When Lantier drew a pistol, Higgins shot and killed him. That shooting was also ruled self-defense.

== Duel with Standifer ==
In 1882, believed to have been in May, Higgins accompanied two hired hands into Mexico to buy horses. However, he became engaged in a gunfight with one of the Mexican men with whom he was buying the horses after the two squabbled over the previously agreed price. Higgins killed the man, and he and his employees fled. Friends of the dead man, numbering around twenty men, pursued Higgins and his hired hands. This resulted in a running gun battle between the two groups. One of Higgins' men was wounded, but they continued to move as quickly as possible toward the Rio Grande river. All three made it across the river safely. Higgins would later comment that it was during this incident that he fought harder than at any other time in his life.

By the late 1880s, Higgins had moved to the Texas Panhandle, specifically Spur, Texas, and was hired by Fred Horsbrugh to work as a "protection man" for the Spur Ranch. While in this employment, Higgins was involved in several gunfights with rustlers, lynching several he managed to capture. In 1900, Higgins became involved in an ongoing dispute with fellow range detective and former sheriff Bill Standifer, which resulted in both men being fired from their jobs in 1903.

Standifer is alleged to have threatened Higgins' son, Cullen Higgins, over a specific legal matter involving Standifer's wife which Cullen handled. This matter inflamed a general dislike the two already had for each other and resulted in Higgins telling Standifer that if they met again it would be with guns. It is unlikely that this event was the only aggravating circumstance between the two men; their mutual dislike has never been fully understood. During their time working on the Spur Ranch, they often worked together productively. Standifer was connected through family to the Horrell Brothers, however, and it is possible this was the source of the troubles.

Standifer had only recently, in 1898, killed a man named Kiggings in a gunfight in Clairemont, Texas. Standifer had previously worked for the Spur Ranch and was elected sheriff of Hartley County, Texas; after a two-year term, he returned to Spur. Higgins, it is said, had by that time accused Bill McComas, a friend to Standifer, of cattle rustling. Although it is not certain, Standifer evidently believed that Higgins had also included him in this accusation. He confronted Higgins, and when the two began arguing, Fred Horsbrugh fired them. However, Higgins convinced Horsbrugh to keep him on for another couple of months, until he could make arrangements to move his family. This infuriated Standifer.

On October 4, 1904, Standifer had spoken publicly about settling his differences with Higgins once and for all. Both men indeed decided to settle their differences in a duel. That day Standifer rode out to Higgins' house. Higgins saw him coming and rode out to meet him. Both men were armed, and although it is unknown exactly what was said, Standifer drew his gun as he went to dismount; Higgins reacted by drawing his rifle and shooting Standifer dead. The shooting was witnessed by Higgins' daughter and brother-in-law. Ruled as having acted in self-defense, Higgins was never indicted.

== Family ==
Higgins' first marriage, in 1875, was to Delilah Elizabeth Mitchell. The couple had two sons, Tom and Cullen, and a daughter, Malinda Caledonia. His first wife's name proved prophetic, as they were divorced in 1882 due to Delilah's infidelity. Higgins' second marriage was to Lena Rivers Sweet, in 1883. Together, they had six daughters and a son, with the son and one daughter dying in infancy.

Both sons from the first marriage became prominent attorneys, with Cullen being appointed as District Attorney for Scurry, Stonewall, Kent, Fisher, Jones, Throckmorton, and Haskell Counties. Cullen Higgins was assassinated in 1918 over a case he was involved in prosecuting.

== Death ==
John Higgins died of a heart attack on December 18, 1913, and is buried in Spur, Texas.

== See also ==
- Horrell Brothers
