= Langford Peel =

Gunfighter in the American Old West

Langford M. Peel (1829/1831 – July 21, 1867), also known as Farmer Peel, was a soldier, gunman, and gambler in the American Old West. According to his grave marker, Langford was born in Liverpool, England. At age 12 he enlisted in the U.S. Army with the approval and help of his mother and stepfather. At the age of 17, he enlisted as a bugler in B Company of the 1st US Dragoons under Captain Edwin Vose Sumner; Peel was still under 20 years of age when he killed his first three Indians at the Battle of Coon Creek in 1846. In 1850 he killed two more near Fort Kearney, Kansas, and a sixth later. Peel "was the best specimen of 160 pounds, five feet, nine inches, naturally bright, clear headed and helpful always." Sgt. Percivel Lowe later said that a "full set of such noncommissioned officers under a good commander would make a troop [ or company] invincible against any reasonable odds." At the time of his First Sergeant's (Percival Lowe) honorable discharge from the army in 1854, Langford was married and had a two-year-old son living on the fort, named after his first sergeant: Percival Lowe Peel. He traveled to Leavenworth, Kansas; Salt Lake City; Nevada; and eventually Helena, Montana.

On July 21, 1867, Peel was shot and killed in the streets of Helena. While walking down the sidewalk arm in arm with his girlfriend, a former associate of his, John Bull, sprang from a black alley and shot Peel once in the upper chest. Peel's girlfriend gripped his gun arm so hard that Peel had to use extra force to free his shooting arm from her, but it was too late, those precious two seconds brought him another bullet from Bull, and as Peel lay on the ground dying, Bull finished him off. The defendant was acquitted August 24, 1867. Bull was later involved in the stabbing of a railroad baggageman and in 1874 was indicted in Omaha, Nebraska for involvement with others on a robbery charge; one of the defendants escaped and the rest were freed. In 1879, he ran a faro game at the Sacramento State Fair. Bull was killed in Denver, Colorado, on January 9, 1882, by fellow gambler Jim Bush.

Alleged by some sources to have been Harvard-educated, Peel was known for always giving any opponent a chance in a gunfight.

Mark Twain, in his book Roughing It, refers (perhaps as an inside joke) to Peel as "Farmer Pease".
