= John Bull (gunman) =

English Old West gunman (1836–1929)

- Born: John Edwin Bull c. 1836; England
- Died: 1929 (aged 92–93); Excelsior Springs, Missouri, United States
- Known for: Being gunfighter of the Old West

John Bull (c. 1836–1929) was a little-known English gunman of the American Old West. He is featured in the book "Deadly Dozen", written by author Robert K. DeArment as one of the twelve most underrated gunmen of the 19th century west.

== Early life ==
John Edwin Bull was born in England and little more is known about his early life. It is not known precisely when he ventured to the United States, but it is believed to have been some time during the 1850s. He first appeared in historical texts, in 1861, as a professional gambler who made a living mining in boomtowns.

On August 25, 1862, he was involved in a gunfight while in the mining camp of Gold Creek, located in Montana Territory. He entered the town stating his name was John Bull, and that he and his companion, a man named Fox, were on the trail of horse thieves who had stolen six valuable horses in Elk City, Idaho. The thieves, C.W. Spillman, Bill Arnett, and B.F. Jermagin had entered the camp about three days before Bull and Fox arrived.

Bull and Fox captured Spillman with no incident, and placed him in the custody of several miners while the two continued to search for the others. After locating them in a large tent used as a saloon, Bull stepped inside with a double barrel shotgun, and demanded both men throw up their hands and surrender. Arnett immediately grabbed his pistol, which was lying on the table beside him, at which point Bull shot him dead with one blast from his shotgun in the chest. Jermagin surrendered, and he and Spillman were tried the next morning in a makeshift court. Jermagin was able to successfully argue that he played no part in the horse theft. However, Spillman was convicted and sentenced to hang. The following morning, he was executed.

At this time mining camps in Nevada Territory were booming, most prominently in Aurora, and then Austin. John Bull settled at the silver camp of Austin, in the center of the Territory. Early in 1864 there came about a nationalistic dispute over who was “chief” in Austin - the Irish or the English. In deference of the late editorial against dueling with pistols and knives, the use of those weapons was rejected by involved parties. It so happened another talent of Johnny Bull was fisticuffs. The issue was finally settled between Bull and a particular Irishman. They met up late at night on February 21, in a saloon at the corner of Main and Cedar Streets. Inside, within the presence of an excited crowd, the two combatants (with their seconds) came to an agreement with regard to the rules of pugilism to be allowed:

They thereupon adjourned to the street. Mac Waterhouse was selected by the Englishman as his second, and George Loney by the Irishman, and after these preliminaries had been gone through with, the mauling commenced about twelve o’clock. Twenty-one rounds were fought and for a time the battle was very hotly contested, both giving and receiving very hard knocks and showing no signs of yielding. But Johnny Bull’s endurance was too much for Irish grit, and the victory was decided in favor of the Englishman. It is claimed however, that the result was entirely owing to the instructions Mac gave his man during the twenty-first round; that is, to feint with his left, take one step back, and give an uppercut with his right. This direction was followed and gained the fight. Both men were severely punished. A large crowd witnessed the contest, many being present in dishabille [state of casual attire], not having time to dress themselves when they jumped out of bed to see what was going on. We are making fine progress in "muscular Christianity." A prize fight in our public thoroughfare. Who can beat it?

— Reese River Reveille – February 23, 1864

By 1865 Bull had partnered with Langford Peel, they were moving together next to Belmont, Nevada. [Montana Post – August 4, 1867]

== Life and reputation ==
=== Duel with Langford M. Peel ===
Bull was next heard of in 1866, when he arrived in Virginia City, Nevada. By this time, he was partnered in a gambling operation with fellow Englishman Langford M. Peel, known as "Farmer" Peel, a former soldier. During this time, famed writer Mark Twain became friends with Bull, writing later of how well they had gotten along, and particularly of a joke that Bull had once pulled on Twain during the winter of 1866.

Bull and Peel, by early 1867, had moved their operations on to Belmont, Nevada, and then to Salt Lake City, Utah. While in Salt Lake City, the two argued, and for a time separated. However, by the summer of 1867 the two were working together again, by this time in Helena, Montana. On the night of July 22, 1867, Peel and Bull were seated at a table in the "Greer Brothers Exchange Saloon", and for some reason the argument they had previously had was rekindled. Both men jumped to their feet and began arguing loudly.

Peel slapped Bull in the face with one hand, and pulled his gun with the other. Bull raised his hands, stating, "I am unarmed". Peel responded that he should go and arm himself, then return. Bull retreated to his room, quickly wrote down a makeshift will for the disposition of his property in the event of his death, then took his gun. Peel waited in the saloon, but after an hour he thought that Bull had already fled from his challenge, and therefore left.

By the time Bull had returned, Peel had already left the saloon and moved down the street to the "Chase Saloon" to meet his girlfriend, prostitute Belle Neil. Peel then escorted Neil to retire to his room. As they walked outside onto Helena's Main Street, they were met by Bull. Immediately, the two men then drew their guns, but Peel's arm was unintentionally locked by a shocked Niel, who was tugging his arm and slowing his draw. Bull managed to get off two shots, and Peel fell face down into the street. Bull then walked up calmly, and fired a third round into Peel's head, killing him.

Town Marshal John Xavier "X" Beidler took Bull into custody. That night, a lynch mob gathered, intent on hanging Bull, but Beidler backed them down. In the trial that followed, the jury failed to convict, and Bull was released. He immediately left Helena, traveling to Cheyenne, Wyoming. Langford Peel had been known to have killed at least four men before Bull killed him, and thus Bull was treated as a man with somewhat of a reputation since it was he that killed Peel. In fact, he was treated as somewhat of a celebrity while in Cheyenne.

=== Further gunfights ===
In 1868, now again in Utah, Bull married a woman described as having been gorgeous and ladylike, but ill-suited for his lifestyle. Bull moved with her to Chicago, Illinois, where they had two children. She died of illness in 1872, and Bull placed his children in foster homes. By the following year he was in Omaha, Nebraska, again operating as a gambler.

Shortly before midnight, on July 12, 1873, while in the company of gambler George Mehaffy, Bull and Mehaffy stabbed railroad employee Samual Atwood outside the "Crystal Saloon" in Omaha, due to Atwood warning others that Bull was a crooked gambler running a crooked game. Town Marshal Gilbert Rustin gathered several policemen and went searching for the two men, locating Bull inside "Sullivan's Saloon". When Rustin approached him, Bull produced his pistol, refusing to be arrested, causing Rustin to withdraw. Bull then ran all the patrons out of the saloon, and calmly sat down in a chair, falling asleep. When awakened, he quietly submitted to arrest without resistance.

Atwood was still alive, but in serious condition, and a mob of supporters threatened to hang Bull. Mehaffy by this point had also been captured, and both were being held in the local jail. Atwood, when interviewed, implicated Mehaffy as the one attacker he could identify, and Bull was released. Mehaffy was later freed on bond following Atwood's recovery, and again began working with Bull in their gambling arrangement. Bull began to move around frequently through the small western towns of the day, often in the company of other gamblers, and often taking part in crooked games meant to heist money from unsuspecting amateur gamblers. He also began dabbling in professional boxing as a promoter.

In 1874, he and Mehaffy were arrested for armed robbery, citing that they had robbed a man named Wilkinson in a gin mill. In 1875, those charges were dropped, after which Bull was released on bond and jumped bail. Due to him having worn out his welcome in that area, Bull moved on to Deadwood, South Dakota in 1876, another boomtown. By 1879 he had settled in Denver, Colorado, and over the next few years his name often appeared in police reports, often being arrested for public drunkenness and disturbing the peace. While in "The Slaughterhouse" saloon, he was once arrested for disturbing the peace, at which point he resisted arrest, knocking one policeman unconscious with a walking stick, after which several other officers beat him into submission.

On the night of October 14, 1880, Bull, now partnered with gambler Jim Moon, became involved in an altercation with two city policemen. Moon's wife and another woman who had been dating Bull became involved, throwing chinaware at the officers, causing them to retreat. Bull and Moon met the officers, who returned with more policemen, at the front door, pistols drawn, but after seeing that they could not win, both Bull and Moon surrendered. Less than a month later, Moon killed a man named Sam Hall by beating him on the head with his pistol. He was acquitted on the grounds of self-defense in the trial that followed. Seven months later, Moon, a jealous man, attacked a gambler named Clay Wilson, believing Wilson was paying too much attention to his (Moon's) wife. Wilson shot Moon twice, killing him.

Bull moved on to Denver, where, in January 1882, gambler and associate Jim Bush shot Bull in the foot after an argument. Bull refused to press charges, and let the matter drop. Shortly afterward, he again moved on. In 1898, he was in Spokane, Washington, and attended a show in the "People's Theater" with friend Frisky Barnett. As the two men walked out, Barnett for unknown reasons jammed his lit cigar into Bull's eye, which caused Bull to scream in pain, then draw his pistol. Barnett jumped behind a woman, and drew his own pistol. The two men began firing, both emptying their pistols. One of Bull's shots hit the woman, another took off one of Barnett's fingers. Bull had been shot four times, once in the neck, once in the groin, once in the chin and once in the left arm. The woman recovered, but Bull’s arm was amputated. Barnett was fined $10 for discharging a firearm in city limits, and released. Bull was expected to die, but hung on for several weeks. He recovered, still carrying a bullet in his neck. In 1921, when the bullet began to bother him, he had it removed in Excelsior Springs, Missouri. He recovered and later died in Vancouver, Canada on September 9th, 1929 at the age of 93.
