= John Billee =

American outlaw (died 1890)

- Died: January 16, 1890; Fort Smith, Arkansas, U.S.
- Cause of death: Execution by hanging
- Conviction: First degree murder
- Penalty: Death

John Billee (fl. 1873 – January 16, 1890) was a Creek Indian and an American outlaw of the Old West. He operated in Indian Territory with John Willis and the two murdered W. P. Williams and buried his body in the Kiamichi Mountains. Billie was noted for his bad temper.

Following Billee's arrest by United States Marshals Will Ayers, James Wilkerson, and Perry DuVall (or DuVal) for robbery and murder, he was taken to Fort Smith, Arkansas. During his transportation, he broke free during an overnight stay. Billee slipped out of his handcuffs and killed DuVall with his own pistol. He then wounded Ayers and Wilkerson before being shot and disabled by another [unnamed] guard. Billee and John Willis were tried and condemned. While in custody at Fort Smith, his unruly behavior necessitated his being chained to a cell wall. In spite of his personal plea to be shot by the hangman, he was dragged to the gallows and hanged.

== See also ==
- Capital punishment by the United States federal government
- List of people executed by the United States federal government
