= Tom Starr =

American outlaw

Thomas Starr
- Born: c. 1813
- Died: 1890
- Occupations: outlaw, Indian scout
- Known for: guerilla leader, Cherokee civil war; outlaw

Thomas Starr (c. 1813–1890) was a Cherokee in the American West, who was declared an outlaw by his tribe in an internal conflict over treaties with the United States government. He was also involved in running whiskey into Indian Territory and rustling stock. Starr was the grandfather of Henry Starr and father in-law to Belle Starr, through her marriage to Sam Starr.

Starr's father was James Starr, a Cherokee leader and a signer of the Treaty of New Echota in December 1835. This treaty had a large impact on the unity and well being of the Cherokee Nation, and many tribal members disagreed with its signing. James Starr was targeted for assassination by Cherokee opposing the treaty, followers of the anti-Removal National Party led by John Ross, and on more than one occasion narrowly escaped death.

A violent series of confrontations eventually led to a Cherokee civil war. Treaty supporters, including the Starr family, James Starr and his six sons, opposed the Ross faction. In retaliation for the attempts on his father's life, Tom Starr became a guerrilla leader in civil war activities. He was accused of attacking and murdering Ross supporter and trader, Benjamin Vore, and his family, at their home near Fort Gibson in 1843. In November 1845, James Starr and his son Buck were attacked at their home by thirty-two armed men and both were killed. Tom Starr witnessed the event but escaped and vowed to avenge the life of his father. The Ross faction of the Cherokee Nation placed a price on Starr's head, and declared him and his surviving brothers outlaw. At least 34 politically related murders were committed among the Cherokee in 1845 and 1846.

The internal Cherokee conflict ended with a formal truce in 1846. The resulting peace treaty between the two factions included a special clause pardoning citizens of the Cherokee Nation for offenses and crimes, and this pardon was extended to Tom Starr. Starr settled land in the southern portion of the Canadian District of the Cherokee Nation, near present-day Briartown, Oklahoma. The Starr brothers and their extended family used the base for a series of crimes, including arson and the theft of cattle, horses and supplies. Starr was alleged to have killed 100 men throughout his lifetime, although the figure is probably exaggerated. Starr also served in Confederate forces during the American Civil War as a scout for General Stand Watie and was acquainted with William Clark Quantrill.

== See also ==
- John Ross (Cherokee chief)
- Stand Watie
