= Daly Gang =

19th-century American criminal gang

- Founded: 1860s
- Years active: 1860s–1870s
- Territory: Nevada Territory, United States
- Ethnicity: American
- Activities: Law enforcement, vigilantism
- Notable members: John Daly, Joseph DeRoche, William Buckley, John Bull

The Daly Gang was a notorious, though now obscure, 19th-century bandit gang that operated in Aurora, Nevada, and its neighboring parts. It was named after its leader, John Daly, but was masterminded by a boss known only as “Three-Fingered” Jack McDowell. Until it was put down and its leaders executed at the behest of a vigilante band in 1864, the gang freely terrorized Aurora and was infamous for its armed robberies and shootouts and violent treatment of its victims and anyone who resisted its robbery. Historians now consider it as one of the most underrated, violent gangs in the Old West.

== History ==
John Daly, the gang's leader and namesake, arrived in Aurora, Nevada, from California in the early 1860s as a hired gun and soon hooked up with "Three-Fingered Jack" McDowell. The two ran an unsavory saloon and began operating an outlaw gang in the Nevada gold fields between Aurora and Carson City that used scare tactics and lynched those who resisted. The Pond Mining Company employed the gang as hired guns in their feud against the Real Del Monte Mining Company over claims to Last Chance Hill. Both companies hired gunmen to intimidate the other side and to keep witnesses from testifying against their companies in court. Within three years some twenty-seven citizens became casualties of the violence.

The gang committed their crimes with little to no interference from the law. To make matters worse for the people of Aurora, many of its members, including John Daly, became City Marshals in the fall of 1863. The next year, the local newspaper Esmeralda Star declared, "No sooner had the Marshal been sworn in than the worst villains that ever infested a civilized community were appointed policemen, and with but few exceptions they were composed of as hard a set [of] criminals [as] ever went unhung." Any witnesses of their crimes were threatened and scared away.

But on February 1, 1864, their murder of a man named William R. Johnson gained national attention and infuriated many of the settlers in the city. Johnson had previously killed a Daly Gang member named Jim Sears when the latter had tried to steal a horse. The Daly Gang retaliated by capturing Johnson, and afterwards either shot him dead or slit his throat, and by some accounts also set his body on fire. This murder drove local authorities to arrest Daly and McDowell and their fellow bandit Masterson in their hideout in the Aurora Saloon and the sheriff to form a posse to capture another gang member, Buckley. Meanwhile, 600 local citizens formed companies of vigilantes they called a "Citizens Safety Committee" at Aurora's Armory Hall and demanded the bandits' heads. The four were locked up in a makeshift prison and, after drumhead trials, hanged outside the hall on February 9 on quickly-built gallows. Sources differ on whether local lawmen or the vigilantes themselves carried out the capture and execution.

This action angered Governor James W. Nye so much that two days later he headed for Aurora with Provost Marshal Van Bokkelen and United States Marshal Wasson, intending to call out the troops from Fort Churchill to put down the vigilantes. However, no action was taken against them after the Marshal looked into the facts.

Daly had two houses and two or three lots in town at time of his hanging, including a cabin on the west side of Court St. south of Pine. His ghost is said to still appear in Aurora, initially during the first anniversary of his execution.

== Prominent members ==
=== George Lloyd ===
George Lloyd was a member of the Daly Gang noteworthy for being the only member killed by John Daly while he and the gang were serving as lawmen in Aurora. Lloyd was a participant in a gunfight that took place in a Sacramento wharf and resulted in the death of a number of men, including some of his relatives. He was tried and imprisoned, but was soon released. John Daly, acting as a peace-officer, met Lloyd in the Del Monte Exchange Saloon. After an argument, the two drew their guns and fired at each other. George was mortally wounded and died later.

=== Tom Carberry ===
Another one of the Daly Gang's most notorious and well-documented members was Irish-born Tom Carberry, nicknamed “Irish Tom”. He was one of the most feared gunfighters in Aurora and Austin, Nevada, having fought a number of shootouts with fellow gunfighters and bandits. When the gang was finally captured by the vigilantes, Carberry was one of those freed after proving he had nothing to do with the Johnson murder, and he was one of the lucky few who survived well after the gang's destruction.

One of Carberry's shootouts was his duel with fellow Daly gang member Vance, who had recently returned to Austin in August 1867. It was reported that Vance was envious of Carberry's reputation, and, wanting to test the latter's skills, Vance challenged him to a duel. Carberry was unarmed at that time, so Vance told him to “get himself heeled” and come back with a weapon. Soon enough, Carberry brought his own pistol, and when he and Vance finally met face-to-face at Austin's main street, both immediately drew guns and commenced firing. During their shootout, Vance's shots missed, but the Irishman took a steadier aim and shot Vance dead. After that incident, only Irish Tom was left of the former Daly Gang in Aurora.

On September 5, 1868, Irish Tom had another duel, with a man named Charles Ridgely. It started when the two unfortunately met each other at Austin's International Hotel. The two men had a previous grudge against each other, and when they met, they started trading insults. Carberry then told Ridgely to get out of the building and arm himself, which the latter angrily obliged. Ridgley got out of the hotel, got his gun, and walked back to face Carberry. As he walked towards the hotel, Carberry suddenly called out to him from the street. Both then quickly drew their pistols and fired multiple shots. Their first shots missed but Tom managed to drill two bullets right into Ridgley's chest that would kill him minutes later. This event would be the last time Irish Tom or the Daly Gang would appear or be mentioned in the contemporary records.
