= N. K. Boswell =

Nathaniel Kimball Boswell
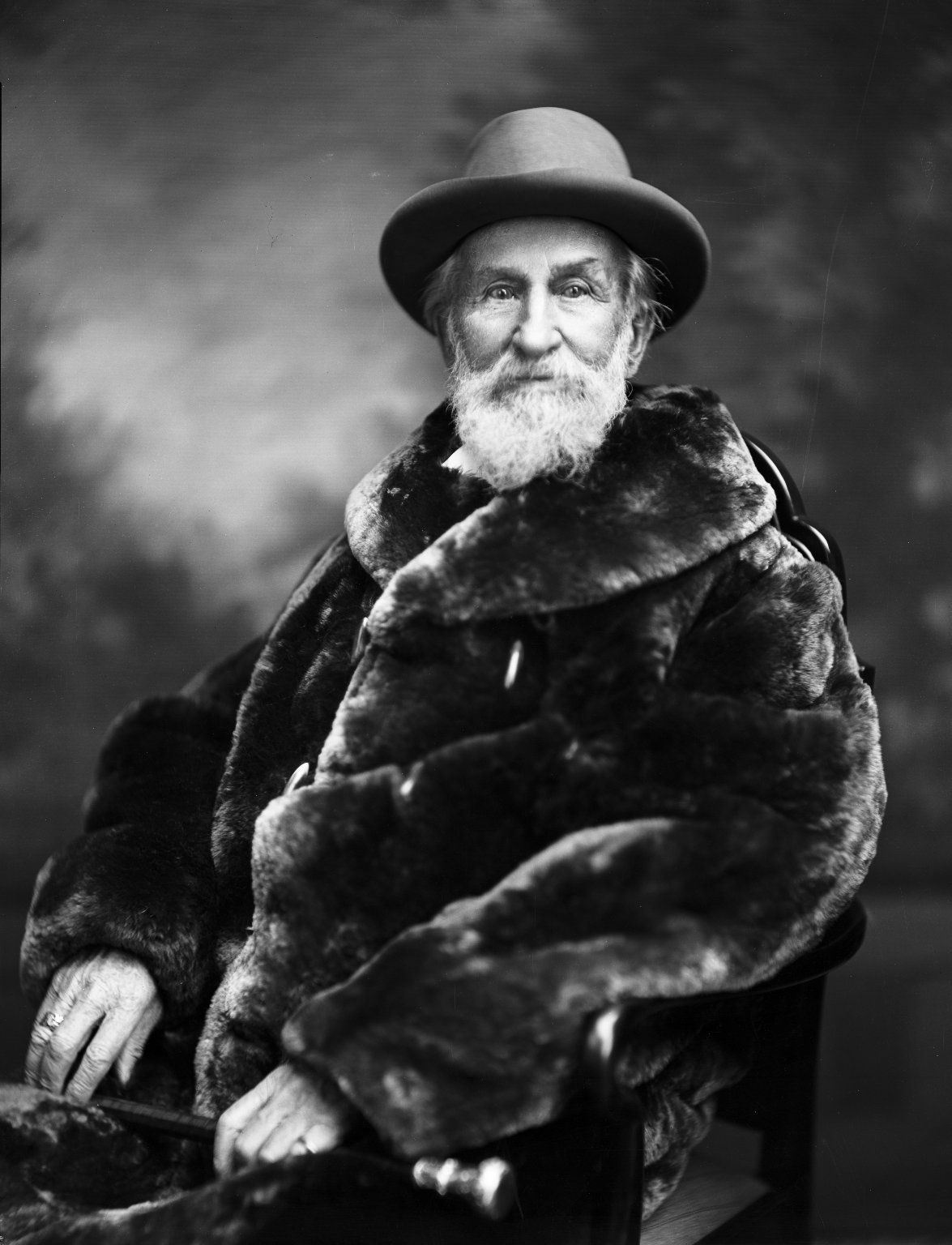
- Born: November 4, 1836; Haverhill, New Hampshire, US
- Died: October 12, 1921 (aged 84); Laramie, Wyoming, US
- Known for: Wild West Lawman

Nathaniel Kimball "N.K." Boswell (November 4, 1836 – October 12, 1921) was an American frontiersman, rancher, cowboy, and lawman of the Old West, best known for building the N.K. Boswell Ranch, today considered a historical location of Wyoming. He also helped to settle Laramie, Wyoming.

== Impact on Laramie, Wyoming, Steve Long lynching ==
Boswell ventured into Wyoming Territory around 1865 towards the end of the American Civil War. He is believed to have served in the Union Army, but it is not certain as to from which state he originated, although it is believed he may have come from New Jersey. Boswell arrived in the area of present-day Laramie, Wyoming, as one of its first settlers. He was joined there by his brother George Boswell and his family. At the time, that area was extremely rough and wild, with numerous outlaws drawn to it due to the lack of law enforcement. Three of those would be early western gunman "Big" Steve Long, and his half brothers Ace and Con Moyer. Long would become the Marshal of Laramie, whereas Boswell would be the first Sheriff of Albany County, Wyoming, where Laramie is located. Almost immediately the two lawmen were at odds.

Boswell was an original member of the local "Vigilance Committee", organized to help bring order to the lawless area. Long and his brothers, however, opened a saloon called the Bucket of Blood, and began strongarming settlers into signing away their property. If they refused, they were more times than not killed. At times, Long would goad them into a fight and shoot them down, at others they were merely killed under mysterious circumstances. In May 1868, Melville C. Brown was elected mayor, but he soon resigned due to the incompetence of city's other officials. By October 1868, Long had killed thirteen men in gunfights, and several others were suspected to have been killed by him, but only those thirteen are confirmed to have died by his hand.

Boswell organized the citizens, and suggested they wait, and eventually Long would put himself in a position to where they could act against him. On October 18, 1868 Long attempted to rob a prospector named Rollie "Hard Luck" Harrison. Harrison produced a pistol, and a gunfight erupted between the two. Long was wounded and retreated. Harrison was killed, dying as a result of his wounds before he was able to relay who shot him to anyone else.

Long confessed to his fiancé how he was wounded, and she in turn told Sheriff Boswell^{189}. Boswell organized several men in the town, and they entered the saloon owned by Long and his brothers on October 28. The mob overwhelmed the three and led them to an unfinished cabin in town. Long was quiet throughout the process, having only one request, that he be allowed to remove his boots, stating "My mother always said I'd die with my boots on". Barefoot, he was lynched along with Con and Ace Moyer by hanging them from the rafters of the cabin. There were no legal actions taken against the members of the lynch mob.

== Later life ==
By this time, Boswell's ranch had become one of the largest and most productive in the territory. One of his fellow lynching vigilantes, L. P. Griswold, moved to Denver, Colorado. He formed a "Vigilance Committee" there in 1872, but was arrested for doing so. Believing he stood no chance if brought to trial, Griswold escaped, and was shot and killed while doing so. Boswell, however, continued to be a prominent figure in Wyoming. In 1872, Boswell served as the first warden of the Wyoming Territorial Prison. He died of unknown causes in 1921. His ranch in Wyoming is now listed on the National Register of Historic Places.

Police appointments
Preceded by New office	Sheriff of Albany County, Wyoming; 1869–1872	Succeeded by Thomas J. Dayton
Preceded by Daniel Nottage	Sheriff of Albany County, Wyoming; 1878–1882	Succeeded by Louis "Lew" Miller
Preceded by New office	Chief detective of the Wyoming Stock Growers Association; 1883–1887	Succeeded by Frank Canton
