= Cyrus Skinner =

American outlaw (ca. 1829 – 1864)

- Born: ca. 1829; Ohio
- Died: January 25, 1864; Missoula County, Montana
- Other names: J. C. Skinner; Cyrus Williamson; Cyrus J. Peter
- Occupation: Saloon keeper
- Known for: Outlaw

Cyrus Skinner (ca. 1829 – January 25, 1864) was an Old West outlaw and brother to criminal George Skinner. Skinner was called a "roadster, fence, and [a] spy" for Henry Plummer. He and his brother were members of Richard H. Barter's (Rattlesnake Dick) gang that robbed a mule train transporting $80,000 (equivalent to $2,866,667 in 2025) in gold bullion. Skinner and Barter were caught stealing mules to transport the gold. He was imprisoned at the Angel Island and San Quentin State Prisons, until he escaped by mid-1860. Skinner left California and established four saloons in Idaho and Montana.

In the spring of 1863, Skinner and fellow outlaws planned an attack against the Bannock people while intoxicated. Some of the men thought better of the idea once they sobered up, and others slept off the alcohol while Winnemuck, the chief, planned a defensive strategy and, if attacked, a plan to kill all of the white people in Bannack, Montana.

Skinner, like many of his outlaw friends, was killed by the Montana Vigilantes. Thomas Dimsdale, editor of the Montana Post and author, said that Skinner was a "hardened, merciless, and brutal fiend."

== Early life ==
Cyrus Skinner, born about 1829 in Ohio to Belinda and Cornelius Skinner, grew up in Plain Township, Wood County, Ohio. His younger siblings were George, Dennis, Reason, and Ruel. Cornelius homesteaded land in Ohio under the Land Act of 1820, beginning with 160 acres on September 12, 1821. In 1850, Skinner and his brother George were in Texas, both having assumed the surname Williamson, before they went to California.

== California ==
Skinner and his brother were criminals from the time that they came to California. Skinner used the aliases Cyrus J. Peter and Cyrus Williamson and was convicted under his name and both aliases. Convicted of larceny, they were both imprisoned in state prisons, and both had records for escaping.

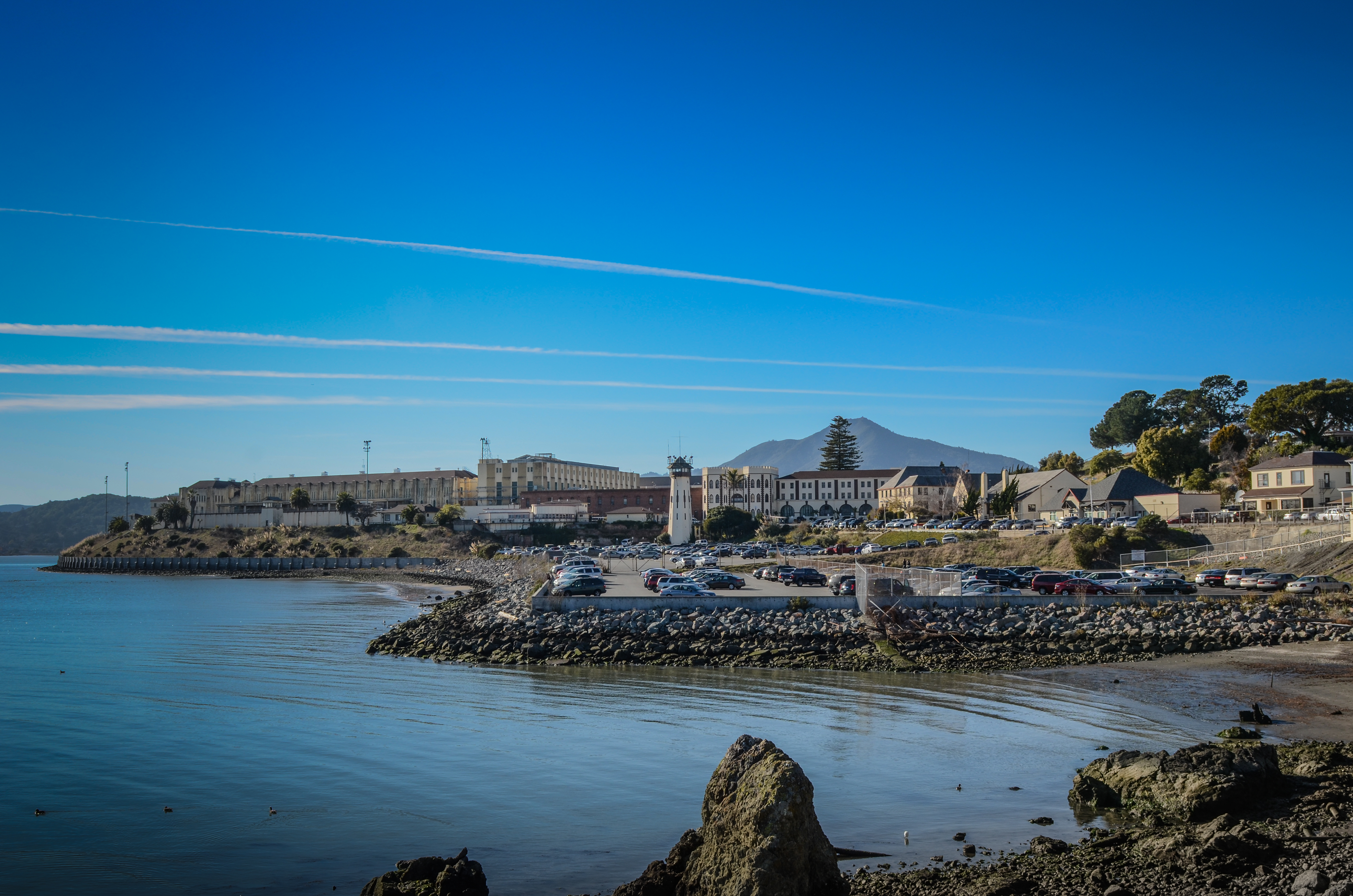
San Quentin State Prison

Convicted of larceny and burglary, Skinner spent two years in San Quentin State Prisons from August 18, 1851, and the department of corrections released him exactly two years later. (Note: His brother George was arrested for the same charges but escaped before his case was tried. George was arrested again in 1852, sentenced to two years, and was in the state prison until November 20, 1854.) On June 13, 1854, Skinner returned to San Quentin as Cyrus Peters. He escaped after serving about four months of a three-year sentence for grand larceny. Ten years were added to his sentence for escaping.

Skinner received a 14-year sentence to be served at Angel Island penitentiary, but he escaped after a few weeks stay, just before he before the mule train robbery of the summer of 1856.

=== Mule train robbery ===
Skinner and his brother George were involved in the 1856 theft of $80,000 (equivalent to $2,866,667 in 2025) of gold bullion along with Big Dolph Newton, Bill Carter, Richard H. Barter (Rattlesnake Dick), Romera (or Romero) Carter, and an unidentified Mexican. The theft was unsuccessful when Cyrus and Barter missed the rendezvous because they were captured with the stolen mules. George buried half the money. The other half was turned over to the law by Carter, but George, having been killed in the capture, never revealed the location of the other $40,000 in gold, which presumably remains hidden in the Trinities.

Barter and Cyrus were arrested for stealing mules and jailed in Auburn. The men escaped and separated. Barter made it to San Francisco. Cyrus was found near Auburn after a few days and ended up at the Angel Island penitentiary with a four-year sentence. He went to San Quentin on May 29, 1856. Henry Plummer, who Skinner helped get elected in the city election, was imprisoned at San Quentin in February 1859.

Skinner escaped San Quentin on May 11, 1860. This branded him as a wanted escaped convict. After he was out of prison, Skinner ran a saloon in the mining town of Florence, Washington Territory (now Idaho), serving outlaws he knew from California, including Henry Plummer. When miners at Florence left for more promising mines, Skinner closed his saloon. He followed the rush of miners to the Grasshopper Creek area and set up a saloon in Bannack, Montana.

== Montana ==
Within a span of three and a half years, Skinner ran the saloon in Idaho and three more in Montana, including Virginia City, Hell Gate, and the Elkhorn Saloon in a log hut in Bannack. (Note: The former saloon building is located in the Bannack State Park.) Skinner's fellow outlaws from California frequented his rowdy business in Bannack. They included Bill Carrhart, Whisky Bill Graves, Bill Hunter, George Ives, Club Foot George Lane, Haze Lyon, Bill Moore, Frank Parrish, Ned Ray, Charlie Reeves, Buck Stinson, and Red Yeager.

=== William A. Clark ===
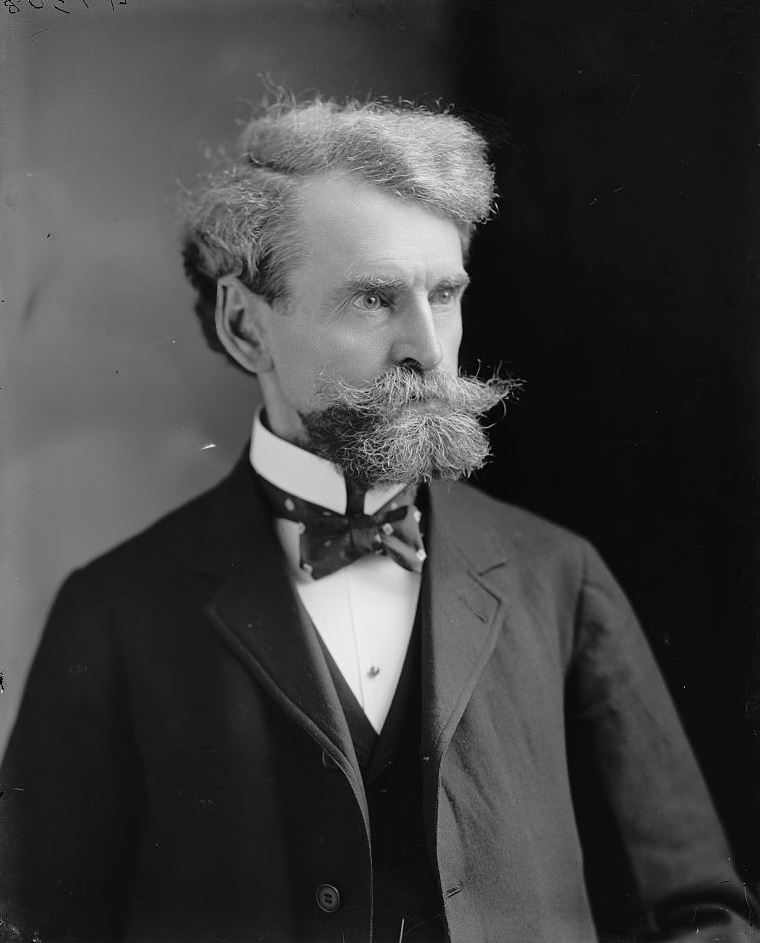
William A. Clark, Harris & Ewing

Skinner provided mail service out of his saloon, and in the summer of 1863, William A. Clark entered the establishment to pick up his mail. With him, he had elk antlers that Skinner bought for $10 (equivalent to $261 in 2025). Clark used that money as a grubstake, beginning a long line of successes in banking, railroad development, and copper mining. He was one of the wealthiest men in the world.

=== Bannock people ===
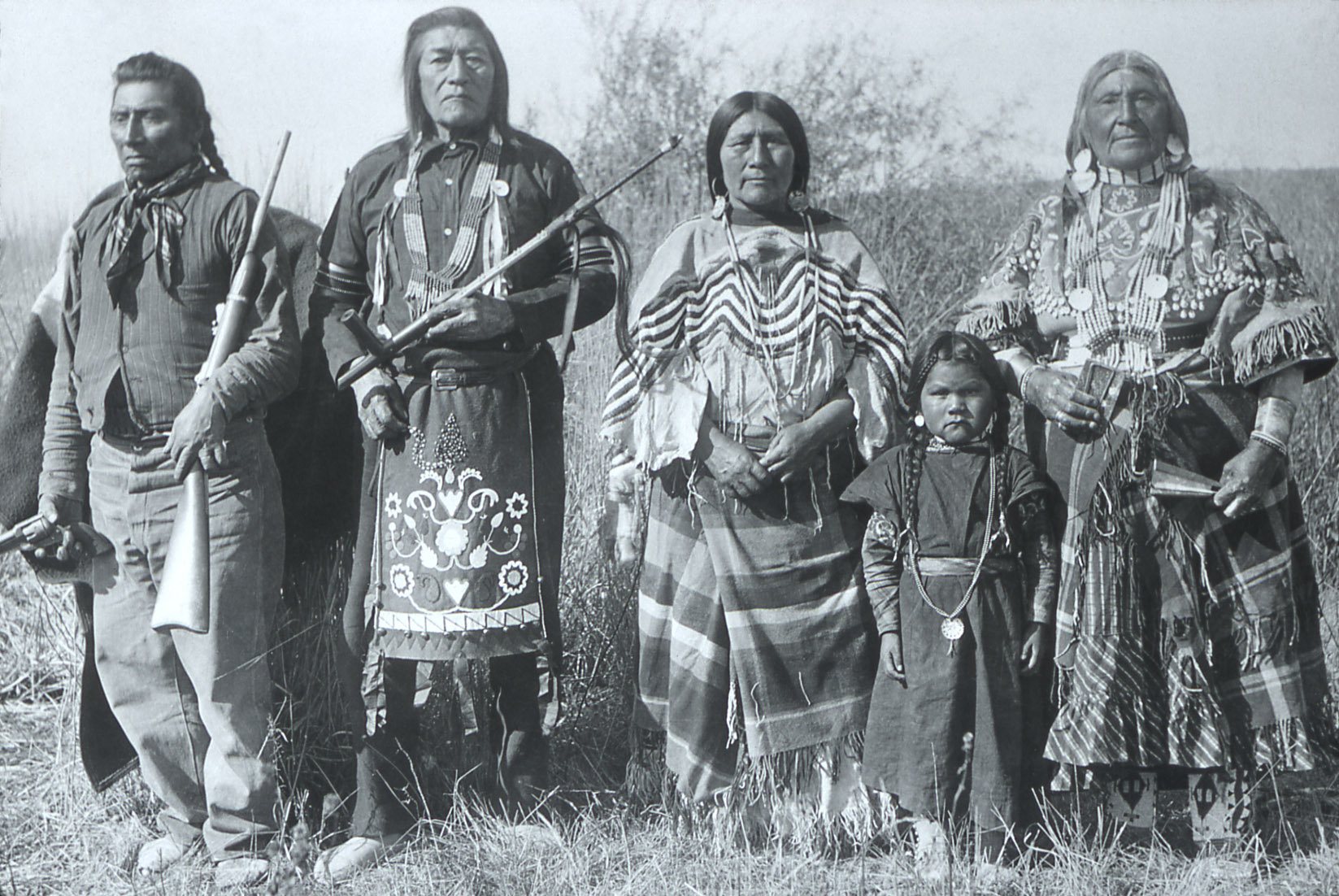
A group of Bannock people

The state was home to the Indigenous Bannock people, led by Chief Winnemuck, other Native Americans, and white people. Most of the white people lived in Pioneer and Bannack. (Note: The indigenous people are Bannock people, the town is Bannack.) The Bannock people ranged throughout Montana and Idaho. In the winter of 1863, a snowstorm trapped them along the Salmon River. Once the snow melted in the spring, the tribe headed for their hunting grounds in a valley in Montana. They stopped at Marysville, to trade furs, hunt, and ask for biscuits.

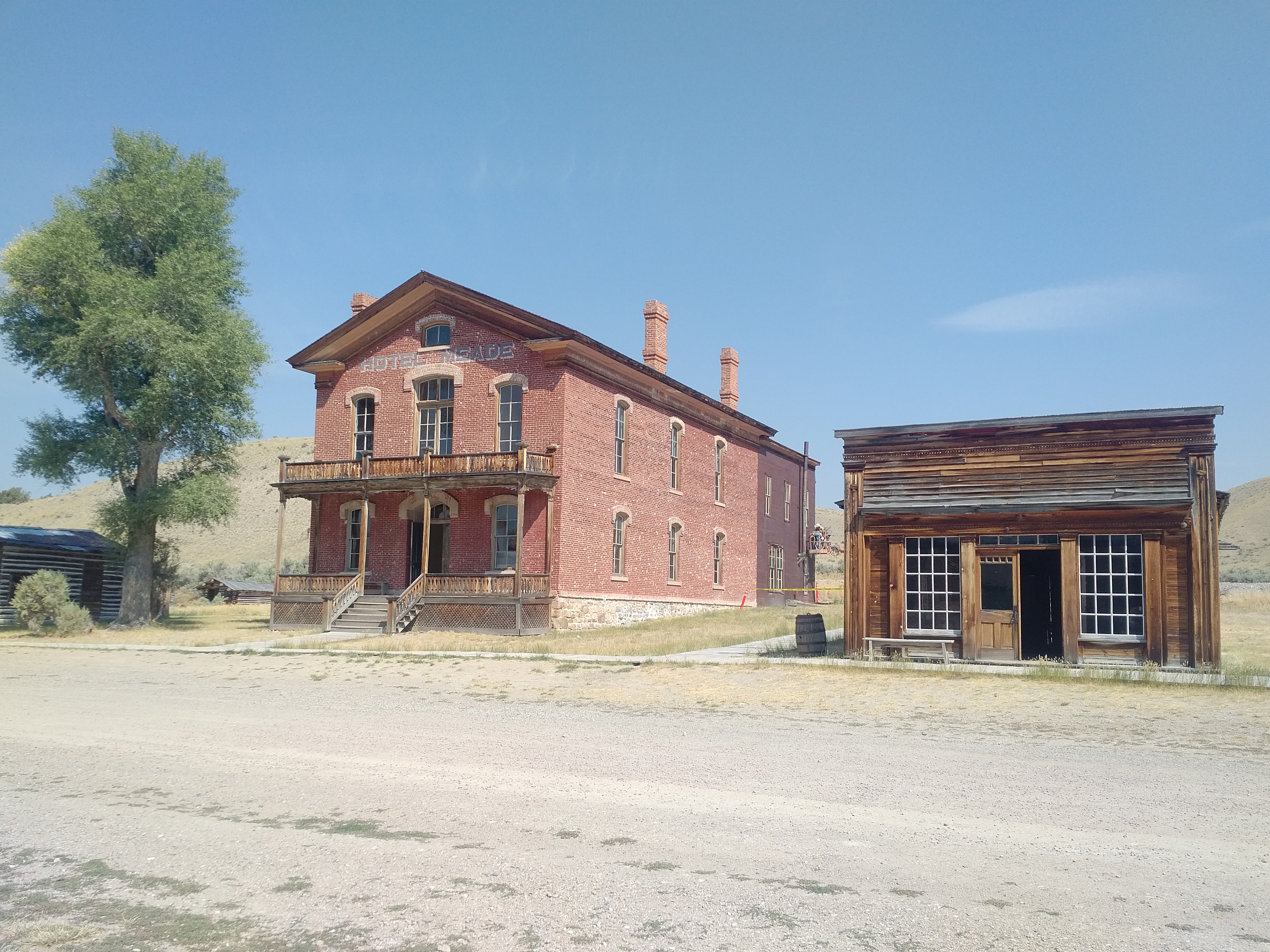
Hotel Meade and Skinner's saloon (right) in Bannack, Montana

Some women traveled along Grasshopper Creek to fish, ending up near placer mines and Grasshopper Gulch (now Bannack), where Skinner had a saloon.

Seeing a nearby encampment of Winnemuck, a chief, and other Bannock people, the inebriated Skinner and his similarly drunk customers decided to kill the camp's men, women, and children. To provide a reason for such an attack, the men made up a story that someone from the tribe shot at a white man and that the Bannock people were on the warpath.

Winnemuck, warned of the plan, had women and children sent to the safety of the old Decouta mine. The best riflemen from the tribe stood above the cliffs overlooking the deep Grasshopper Creek canyon and at a spot with a good view of the main street. Other men readied for battle with knives, axes, and bows and arrows. If attacked, Winnemuck intended to kill everyone in Bannack. In the meantime, as the liquor wore off, some of the men thought better of the idea, and others were sleeping. Once the Bannocks realized that the attack was not imminent, the tribe reconvened at their campsite, packed up, and left for Madison Valley, avoiding a massacre.

=== Hell Gate ===
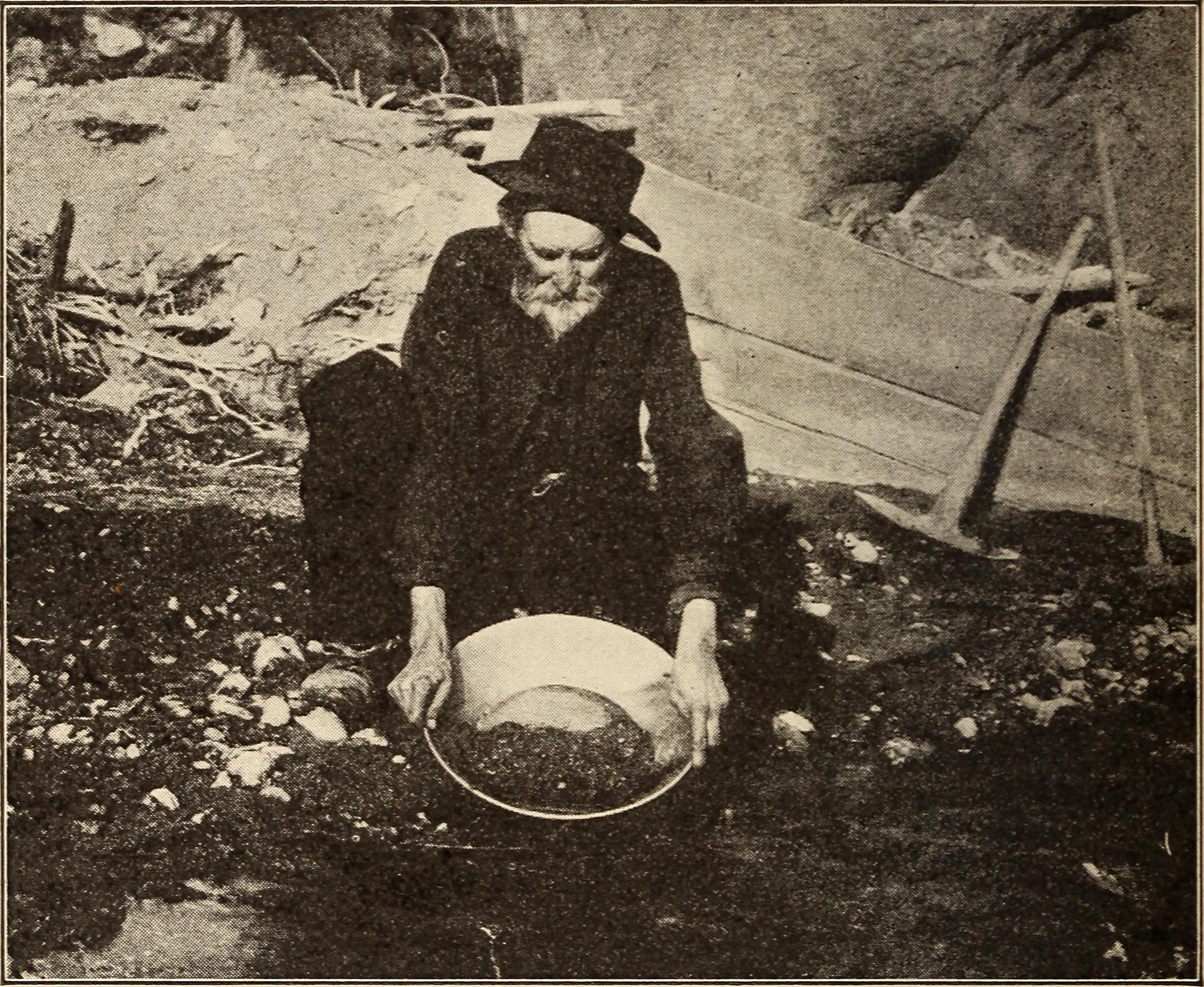
Skinner set up saloons where miners were in good numbers, such as in Alder Gulch. This is a photograph of a man panning for gold in Alder Creek.

Skinner set up a saloon in Alder Gulch in the fall of 1863. By the early winter, Skinner left Alder Gulch with a woman named Nellie. They began setting up a saloon in Hell Gate in Missoula County, Montana, beginning on December 17.

In the meantime, the Montana Vigilantes led a campaign to rid the area of outlaws. They held trials, and executions quickly followed. The vigilantes concluded that Skinner had helped Henry Plummer plan an attack on Lloyd Magruder and others as they traveled to Lewiston, Idaho.

On the night of January 24, vigilantes arrested Skinner outside of his saloon, and a "mock trial" was conducted within 15 hours. Found guilty after midnight, the vigilantes took him to Captain Christopher Higgins' corral in Hell Gate and he was lynched during the early morning hours of January 25, 1864.

== Bibliography ==
- Drago, Harry Sinclair (1973). Road agents and train robbers; half a century of Western banditry. New York, Dodd, Mead. ISBN 978-0-396-06785-6.
- Jackson, Joseph Henry (1949). Bad company; the story of California's legendary and actual stage-robbers, bandits, highwaymen and outlaws from the fifties to the eighties. New York: Harcourt, Brace.
- Mather, Ruth E. (1987). Hanging the sheriff : a biography of Henry Plummer. Salt Lake City: University of Utah Press. ISBN 978-0-87480-300-6.
- Pauley, Art (1980). Henry Plummer, lawman and outlaw. Meagher County News.
- Reinstedt, Randall A. (1994). Tales and treasures of the California gold rush. Carmel, California: Ghost Town Publications. ISBN 978-0-933818-28-6.
