= Richard H. Barter =

Outlaw

- Born: ca. 1833; Quebec, Lower Canada
- Died: July 11, 1859 (aged 25–26); Auburn, Placer County, California
- Resting place: Old Auburn Cemetery, Auburn, California
- Other names: Rattlesnake Dick (Note: An outlaw named John Richard Darling also took the name Rattlesnake Dick after Barter had died.); Richard A. Barter (Note: He is sometimes referred to as Richard A. Barter. Boessenecker states that Richard H. Barter is an error.); Dick Woods
- Known for: Outlaw during California Gold Rush

Richard H. Barter (c. 1833 – July 11, 1859), known as "Rattlesnake Dick", was born in Lower Canada. Around 1850, he came to California on the Oregon Trail with three other family members. He tried his luck at mining at Rattlesnake Bar during the California Gold Rush. He was twice charged, and once convicted, of being a thief, the second time for stealing a mule. Once the mule and the real thief were found, he was released.

For two years, Barter mined in Shasta County under the assumed name of Dick Woods. It was an uneventful period for him until a former foe from Rattlesnake Bar enter the county and shared information about Barter's reputation. Barter's name was sullied again. Turning outlaw, he became a highwayman and joined a gang that was known for stagecoach robbery.

In the summer of 1856, Barter planned one of the biggest holdups during the gold rush. His gang stole $80,000 of gold bullion (equivalent to $2,799,704 in 2024) from a mule train guarded by the Wells Fargo Express, but Barter and Cyrus Skinner were arrested for stealing mules, which foiled the successful completion of the crime. Barter was killed on July 11, 1859 after a shoot-out with lawmen.

== Early life ==
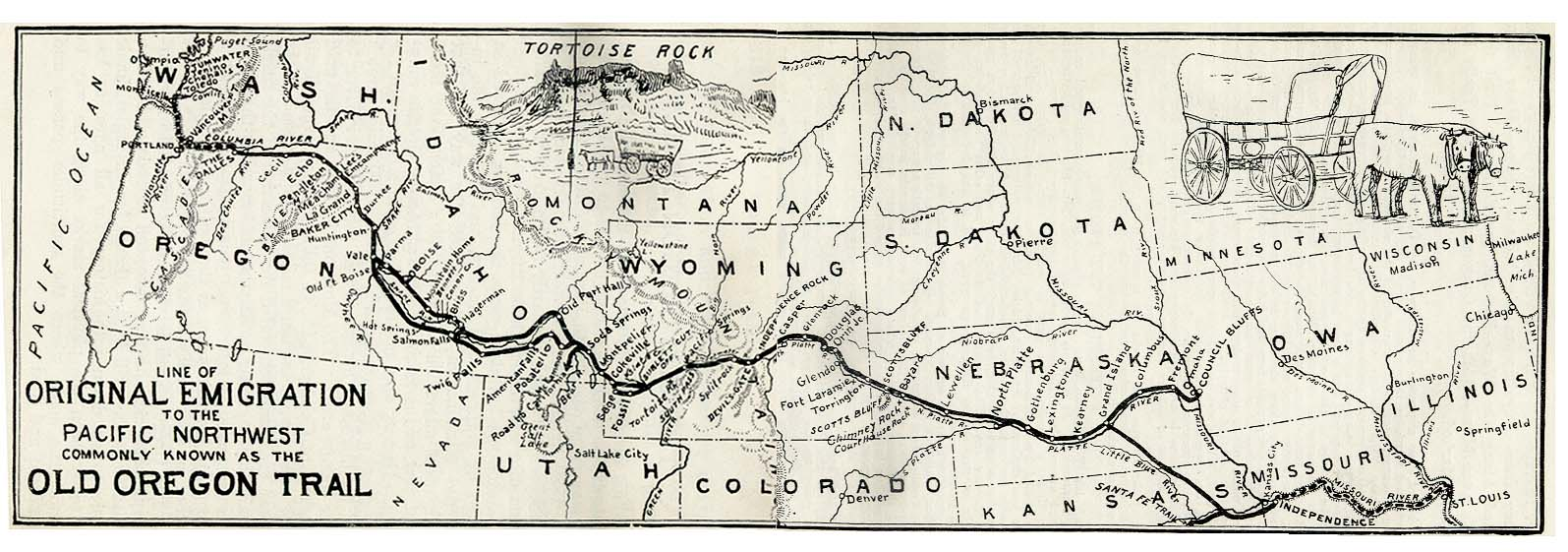
Richard H. Barter traveled the Oregon Trail in 1850 to get to the western United States

Barter, born about 1833 in Quebec, Lower Canada, was the son of an officer of the British Army and a French-Canadian woman. Both of his parents died by 1850 when he traveled to the United States with his older brother, and an older cousin, John Cross. They traveled through America on the Oregon Trail. Barter's sister and brother-in-law, who traveled with them, settled in Sweet Home, Oregon. The two brothers and their cousin headed for the gold mines of California in the spring of 1851. (Note: Homer states that Barter came to California with his sister and cousin, traveling by steamer.) Barter and his brother intended to work in gold mines and save money earned to their sister in Canada.

== Rattlesnake Bar ==
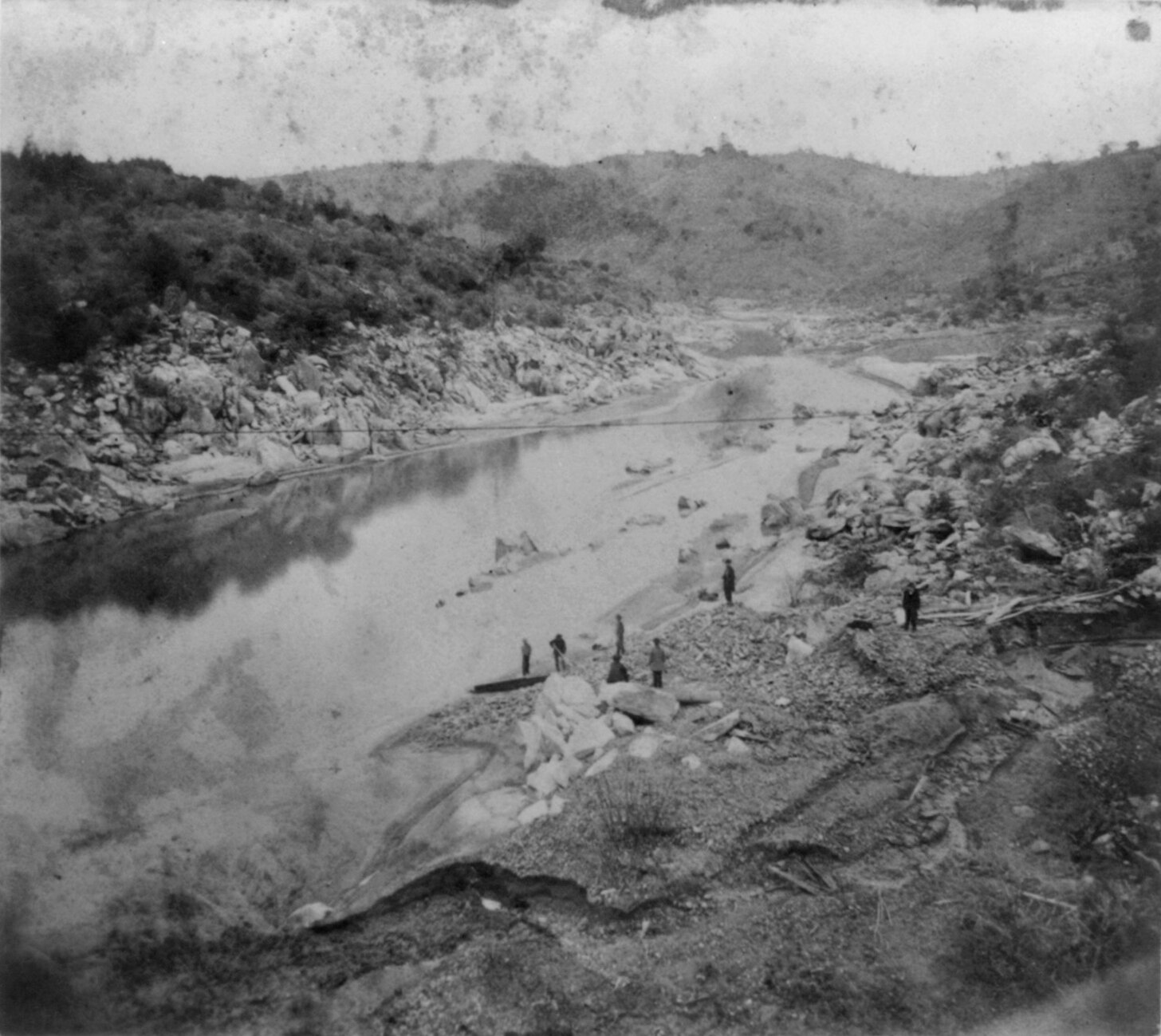
Rattlesnake Bar on the South Fork of the American River, Placer County, California, photographic print, Lawrence & Houseworth, publisher

Barter, his brother, and cousin settled along the North Fork American River at Rattlesnake Bar, a mining camp with hundreds of cabins full of prospectors. In the early 1850s, it was known as a good place to prospect for gold. The men settled in an abandoned cabin. The camp had a saloon, jail, and a couple stores.

By the time they arrived, though, the gold had thinned out considerably. The three men worked hard in difficult conditions, but they did not find much gold. Barter's sister encouraged the men to return to her and her husband's homestead, where they were "doing well". Barter's brother and cousin returned to Oregon after a year. (Note: Homer states that Barter's sister and cousin left Rattlesnake Bar.) By 1853, many of the miners moved on to new sites. About 1854, Barter stayed and did some prospecting on his own and worked for miners who had claims. He was so determined that Rattlesnake Bar would still provide him a fortune that other miners called him "Rattlesnake Dick" in a good-natured manner. Barter had experiences with other men, though, who were cruel and vindictive. A historian from Nevada County wrote that Barter was "naturally able, clever but selfish, vain, and devoid of the ordinary sense of right and wrong—one of these men whose course in life is governed by circumstances."

== Legal woes ==
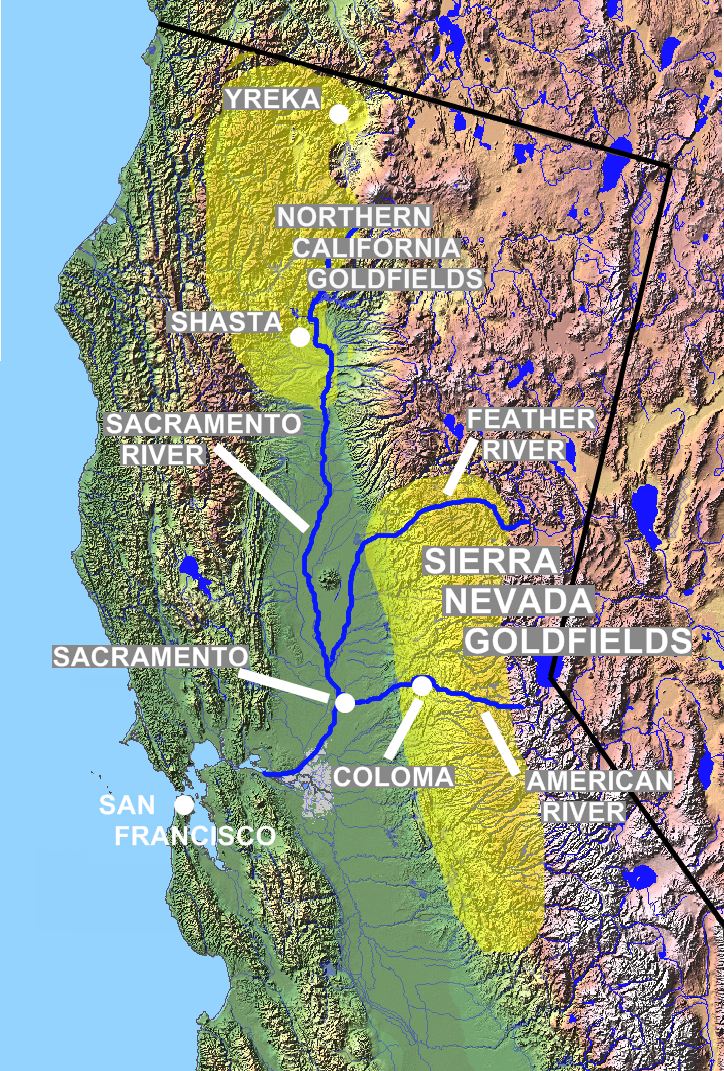
Locations relevant to Barter from north to south: 1) Yreka, where the Wells Fargo Express mule train obtained the gold to carry for Barter's $80,000 heist, 2) Shasta County, where Barter mined, 3) American River, where Rattlesnake Bar is located 4) San Francisco, where Barter was entangled with lawmen and the San Francisco Committee of Vigilance

In 1853, a fellow miner accused Barter of stealing from a dry goods store near Rattlesnake Bar. He was tried and found not guilty by the court. His friends agreed with the ruling. (Note: Drago said that Barter was accused of stealing cattle from the owner of the dry goods store. Homer states that he was accused of stealing items from the store, including a coat.) Lawman John Boggs accused Barter of stealing a horse or a mule the same year. Although Barter had professed his innocence for a second time, he was found guilty and sentenced to two years in prison. When the real culprit and the equine were found, Barter was released from the Folsom jail on his date of imprisonment, before he was transferred to the prison. (Note: Boessenecker stated that Barter spent one year at San Quentin beginning December 20, 1854, for grand larceny and was released when found innocent.)

Having endured two trials for theft, he was considered by many to be a thief. Barter changed his name to Dick Woods and moved 200 miles (320 km) north to Shasta County where he mined for two years in the Lewiston, Trinity, and South Fork of the Klamath Rivers, as well as French Gulch. He met up with other miners who also left Rattlesnake Bar for Shasta County, he mined with some, he left those who were less friendly alone. He came across a man at French Gulch who knew him from Rattlesnake Bar and that he changed his surname to Woods. Besides mining, Barter also made money as a gambler.

People from Rattlesnake Bar came to Shasta County and informed the locals about his reputation. Barter no longer felt welcome in the community.

== Criminal activity ==
Broke and homeless, Barter traveled south to the Red Bluff area and camped there. Barter held up someone for $400 (equivalent to $13,999 in 2024) there. He told the man that he robbed that his name was "Rattlesnake Dick", the "pirate of the Placers". (Note: Homer states that Barter robbed two men of their gold dust.) Barter gained a reputation for robbery, stealing cattle, equines, and gold dust from sluices. Barter robbed mining camps, stores, houses, and travelers. He was best known as a highwayman, robbing stage coaches over six years. It became harder for Barter to avoid arrest as the number of lawmen increased and they became more effective at catching outlaws.

Barter was suspected of planning with Tom Bell's gang to rob a pack train that was carrying $25,000 (equivalent to $874,907 in 2024) in gold on Trinity Mountains on March 12, 1856. George Skinner, Nicanora Rodriquez, and Big Dolph Newton of Tom Bell's gang performed the robbery.

Beginning in the summer of 1856, "Barter went on to form gangs and terrorize the Sierra Foothills from Nevada City to Folsom." The gang he formed included,

- George Skinner, a convicted robber and escapee
- Cyrus Skinner, George's brother, a convicted robber and escapee
- Big Dolph Newton, a horse thief
- Nicorona, also called Romero, an Italian
- Bill Carter, known for his skill with a gun

Jack Phillips, formerly one of the Sydney Ducks, ran the Mountaineer House near Auburn. Phillips let Barter know if lawmen were searching for him, after which he and his gang would go into hiding. (Note: The mood in mining camps changed considerably in 1856. Of the people that were called during the California Gold Rush, there was a growing number of undesirable people from around the world, including Sydney Ducks, criminals from Australia who sailed to San Francisco. Miners could no longer trust that their gold and other goods were safe from their neighbors.)

Barter and his gang were involved in minor robberies in Trinity and Shasta County, during which time the men honed their skills and Barter began to trust them for bigger heists.

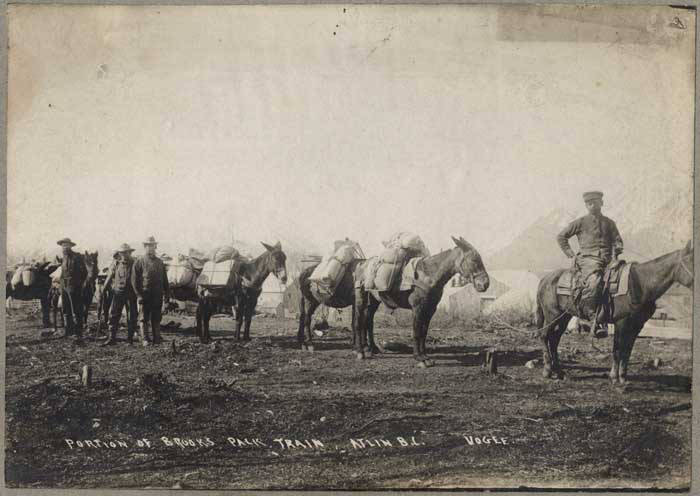
An example of a mule train

In the summer of 1856, Barter planned one of the biggest holdups during the gold rush. The gang held up a mule train carrying gold bullion from the mines of Yreka, through the Trinity Mountains region. Since the mules were branded with the express company's name, "WF" for Wells Fargo, Barter and Cyrus stole mules and were to bring them to a meeting place. Meanwhile, the other four men and an unnamed Mexican man attacked the mule train on Trinity Mountain. They tied the guards up to trees and absconded with $80,000 of gold bullion (equivalent to $2,799,704 in 2024). The men then traveled to the pre-arranged meeting place, but Barter and Cyrus were not there. George and the other men checked the trails and waited for Barter, Cyrus, and the unmarked mules. On the third day of waiting, the Mexican man was nervous they would be caught and tried to leave, and George shot him out of fear he would tell others about the robbery. George buried half the gold and rode out with the other half to Folsom where the three robbers hid the remaining $40,000 in gold. The men went to Phillips' Mountaineer House to see if there was information about what had happened to Barter and Cyrus. They were met by a posse and James Barkeley, a detective for Wells Fargo. George was killed instantly, Romero was seriously injured, and the other two men surrendered. Romero and Newton were sentenced to ten years. Carter turned over the $40,000 that was buried at Folsom and was pardoned. He left the life of crime, and died a poor man. The other $40,000 in gold, buried secretly by George, presumably remains hidden. Barter and Cyrus were arrested for stealing mules and jailed in Auburn. The men escaped and separated. Cyrus was found near Auburn and ended up at the Angel Island penitentiary. Barter made it to San Francisco. (Note: Reinstedt states that Barter served his term for stealing the mules.)

The San Francisco Committee of Vigilance and policemen were suspicious of Barter, who was brought to the police department many times as a suspect. Barter left San Francisco and formed his own gang in 1858 that rivaled Tom Bell's gang with,

- Jim Driscoll
- George Taylor
- Billy Dickson
- Aleck Wright

Barter's gang went to mining areas northeast of San Francisco and committed highway robberies and burglaries. Their crimes were committed over five counties generally with just two men, so that it was easier and safer to get away after their thievery. Barter was arrested several times and he broke out of "every jail in Placer and Nevada counties". Lawman John Boggs of Placer County, feared by outlaws, was persistent in his effort to capture Barter. Upon hearing that Barter was traveling by stage with Taylor, Boggs obtained a warrant and singlehandedly tried to arrest both men from a Nevada City stagecoach. Barter and Taylor claimed they were not the men that Boggs was seeking. Taylor asked to see the warrant, Boggs fumbled the paperwork, and Barter and Taylor shot at him. Boggs fired back and the outlaws ran away, avoiding arrest.

On July 11, 1859, Barter and Wright went to Auburn for a drink in a saloon. Someone noticed Barter and spread the word that he was in town. Barter and Wright were met in Placer County, California by undersheriff George C. Johnston, deputy sheriff W. M. Crutcher, and deputy tax collector George W. Martin. Martin was killed, and Barter was injured but escaped. His body was found the next day outside Auburn with two bullets in the chest and a third in his brain. It seemed that Barter had been shot twice and would likely have died from the injury, but people speculated that he may have been shot a third time, this time in the head, for a quicker death. He could have done it himself, his companion may have done it, or someone else. It remains unknown who might have fired the final shot. Barter's body was buried at the Auburn Cemetery in the town of Auburn. His gravestone states, "Rattlesnake Dick, 1833-1859, Richard H. Barter, early day resident of Rattlesnake Bar, famed as the outlaw Rattlesnake Dick, fatally wounded in a gun duel with the law July 11, 1859 near the Martin Park Fire Station in Auburn." (Note: Homer states that Barter's gravestone is at Odd Fellows Cemetery on Fulweiler Avenue, and his body is buried at Old Auburn Cemetery.)

External image
- Historical marker, Placer County Historical Society

In 1988, the Placer County Historical Society placed a marker at the site of the Junction House, a hotel and stagecoach station in Auburn, where Barter's body was found.

== Personal life ==
After he died, a letter was found on him from his sister Harriet of Sweet Home, Oregon, dated March 14, 1859. She expressed how much their family missed him and had repeatedly sent him letters that were not answered. She stated that she hoped that he could get in touch with them and give up his life of crime. She ended the letter with "look down deep into your heart and see if there is not a which to remember your sister, your own most affectionate and anxious sister."

== See also ==
- List of unsolved deaths

== Bibliography ==
- Boessenecker, John (1993). Badge and Buckshot: Lawlessness in Old California. University of Oklahoma Press. ISBN 978-0-8061-2510-7.
- Drago, Harry Sinclair (1973). Road agents and train robbers; half a century of Western banditry. New York: Dodd, Mead. ISBN 978-0-396-06785-6.
- Homer, A. Thomas (1988). Auburn and Placer County : crossroads of a golden era. With Betty Roby, Auburn Area Chamber of Commerce. Northridge, California: Windsor Publications. ISBN 978-0-89781-237-5.
- Jackson, Joseph Henry (1949). Bad company; the story of California's legendary and actual stage-robbers, bandits, highwaymen and outlaws from the fifties to the eighties. New York: Harcourt, Brace.
- Reinstedt, Randall A. (1994). Tales and treasures of the California gold rush. Carmel, California: Ghost Town Publications. ISBN 978-0-933818-28-6.
