= Steve Long =

American outlaw

- Died: October 28, 1868
- Cause of death: Lynching
- Occupation: Law enforcement officer

"Big" Steve Long (died October 28, 1868) was an American law enforcement officer and outlaw, achieving notoriety in the Wyoming Territory during the late 1860s. He was one of the earliest examples of an Old West gunman. Because of their lawlessness, he and two half-brothers were lynched by a posse put together by newly appointed sheriff N.K. Boswell in 1868.

== Early life ==
Little is known about Steve Long's early life or childhood. It is believed that Long served in the Confederate States Army during the American Civil War, under a different name. After the American Civil War, around 1866, he settled in Laramie, Wyoming, where he and his half-brothers, Ace and Con Moyer, established a saloon. Both Ace and Con helped found Laramie. Long reportedly spent several years as an early version of a gunfighter before being elected in 1867 as Deputy Marshal of Laramie^{:189}.

== Lawman and outlaw ==
Long soon earned a reputation as a particularly violent lawman, killing eight men in gunfights within two months. On October 22, 1867, Long opened fire on eight men during a street brawl after his orders to cease were ignored, killing five of the men.^{:189} He rarely arrested anyone, choosing instead to either intimidate them with the threat of force or shoot them.

Long and his brothers used their forceful personalities and his position as the Deputy Marshal to their own financial advantage. Within months of his appointment as deputy marshal, they forced several local ranchers to sign over to them the deeds to their properties. Several of those who refused were later confronted alone by Long, who killed them, always claiming later that the other man had reached for a weapon. If the victim was not carrying a pistol or rifle, Long would place one on his person after killing him. There were never any witnesses. It is alleged that Long killed at least nine men in that manner during a four-month period. Local residents called the saloon the "Bucket of Blood" because of the violence that often took place inside.

By October 1868, Long had killed thirteen men. Another seven men had been killed under suspicious circumstances, with Long suspected, but his role was never confirmed. There was no evidence to support his being named as the killer in these incidents. Long made little effort to find the alleged murderers, leading to speculation that he had committed those murders. Each of the seven men were known to have refused to sign over land deeds to Long and his brothers.

== Capture and death ==
A local rancher and the first sheriff of Albany County, N. K. Boswell, organized several other ranchers to conspire against the three brothers. Boswell insisted that if they could watch Long closely enough, eventually they could catch him in the act of committing a crime, and could then act against him with the law on their side. On October 18, 1868, Long attempted to rob a prospector named Rollie "Hard Luck" Harrison. Harrison drew a pistol, and a gunfight broke out. Long was wounded and retreated. Harrison was killed, dying from his wounds after naming his assailant.

Long confessed to his fiancee how he had been wounded, and she told N. K. Boswell^{:189}. Boswell gathered several men in the town, and they entered the saloon owned by Long and his brothers on October 28. The posse overwhelmed the brothers and led them to an unfinished cabin in town. Long was quiet throughout the process. He asked only to be allowed to remove his boots, saying, "My mother always said I'd die with my boots on". He was lynched barefoot, hanged along with Con and Ace Moyer from the rafters of the cabin. There were no legal actions taken against the members of the lynch mob. A photograph of the three men after they were hanged was taken, and on the back was written, "(1) Gunfighter "Big" Steve Long, (2) Con Moyer, (3) Ace Moyer, A lynching in Laramie Wyo. -1868- Con & Ace were founders of Laramie Wyoming!". Following his death, Long's fiancee erected a marker in his memory.
