= John Daly (outlaw) =

American criminal (1839–1864)

John Daly (c. 1839 – February 1864) was an outlaw in the American Old West and the leader of the Daly Gang. Daly and his gang were known for terrorizing townspeople with the violent treatment of those who resisted their thievery. In 1864, a citizen posse caught and hanged Daly near Aurora, Nevada after a brutal murder.

== Biography ==
John Daly, by most accounts, was born in New York and wound up in California by way of British North America. He was said by the Esmerelda Star to be a handsome man. In late 1862, at around 23 years of age, with a string of dead men reportedly in his past (a rumored four to ten in Sacramento, California, alone), Daly rode into the boomtown of Aurora in the Nevada Territory, in what is now Mineral County, to make his living off of the gold rush underway there at the time.

The Pond Mining Company hired him and associates John McDowell, alias Three-Fingered Jack, Italian Jim, William Buckley, Jim Sears, and many others to protect its interests. The Pond was fighting with the Real Del Monte Mining Company over claims to Last Chance Hill. Both companies hired gunmen to intimidate the other side and to keep witnesses from testifying against their companies in court. Within three years some twenty-seven of the town's citizens had met their deaths by violence. Then, in the fall of 1863, Daly and several of his men became deputy city marshals of Aurora and took to shaking down honest merchants. "No sooner had the Marshal been sworn in," the Star said the next year, "than the worst villains that ever infested a civilized community were appointed policemen, and with but few exceptions they were composed of as hard a set [of] criminals [as] ever went unhung."

In April 1863, Daly Gang member Jim Sears stole a horse tied near Hoy's Station, on the banks of the West Walker River, and rode away. The owner, Louis Wedertz, much distressed by the loss, went down the road to Jack Wright's Station, now Wellington, and asked for the assistance of W. R. Johnson, who was keeping the place. Johnson directed John A. Rogers, one of his men, to pursue the robber and fetch the horse back. At Sweetwater Rogers overtook Sears, who, being called upon three times to stop and refusing to comply, was shot dead. The horse was returned to Wedertz, and Johnson and Rogers were commended.

The gang, determined to kill Johnson for his actions, induced him to go to Adobe Meadows and keep a station there, intending to kill him without witnesses. He agreed and went to Aurora on February 1, 1864, but the gang's intentions were discovered by one of Johnson's friends, who warned him of the danger and advised him to beg off the visit. When Johnson did so, the conspirators, satisfied that their victim had discovered their intentions, decided to kill him that night. They coaxed him down to a saloon, where he spent the night and then started for his lodgings, and was met on Antelope Street by four men and shot dead.

Such a senseless murder enraged the town. Daly, James Masterson, and John McDowell were arrested by the authorities and lodged in jail, while Sheriff Francis, with an eager posse, started in pursuit of William Buckley, who had fled. The prisoners were given a preliminary examination before Justice Moore at the old police station, during which an altercation occurred between one of the Daly crowd, named Vance, and a citizen named Watkins, resulting in the shooting of Vance in the groin. Gang member and gunman Pliney Gardner was also captured, along with "Irish Tom" Carberry and others, but, deemed to have played no part in the murder, they were simply banished from the territory. There could be found neither witnesses to testify against the gang members nor court officials to try their case for fear of retribution. Infuriated at this timid response, around 600 men met at Armory Hall and formed a "Citizens Safety Committee" of vigilantes, who took matters into their own hands, marching to the jail and demanding custody of the prisoners.

For several days saloons had been required to close their doors at 9:00 PM, and on the ninth, the day set for the execution, all business was suspended. Five thousand people flocked into town from miles around, the majority of them in sympathy with the proceedings. The town was very quiet, guards patrolled the streets, and everything was still and orderly, and, when Territorial Governor James W. Nye telegraphed to Samuel Youngs, one of the County Commissioners, that there must be no violence, Youngs replied: "All quiet and orderly. Four men will be hung in half an hour." At noon the vigilante companies formed about the scaffold under the command of Colonel Palmer, who received his orders from Armory Hall. The four doomed men were escorted to the scaffold, while guards kept the crowd at a distance. The execution could be witnessed to great advantage from a number of places in town, and at each there assembled a crowd of eager spectators. Daly reportedly took a swig of whiskey while McDowell professed the innocence of Masterson and Buckley, but at 1:30 PM a little cannon that stood beside the gallows was fired, the rope was cut, and the four men disappeared through the trap-door and soon hung lifeless, a terrible testament to the vengeance of an outraged community.

This action so angered Governor Nye that two days later he headed for Aurora with a Provost Marshal Van Bokkelen and United States Marshal Wasson and was going to call out the troops from Fort Churchill to put down the vigilantes. After the Marshal looked into the facts no action was taken against the "Citizens Safety Committee" and things were quiet at last.

Daly had two houses and two or three lots in town at the time of his hanging, including a cabin on the west side of Court Street south of Pine.

== Resources ==
- Sifakis, Carl. Encyclopedia of American Crime, New York, Facts on File Inc., 1982
- McGrath, Roger D. Gunfighters, Highwaymen, and Vigilantes: Violence on the Frontier., University of California Press, Mar 23, 1987
- Thompson & West. History of Nevada 1881, With Illustrations And Biographical Sketches Of Its Prominent Men And Pioneers, pp. 401–425
