= Sam Brown (outlaw) =

American Criminal

Sam Brown (6 July 1831?, in Ohio? – 6 July 1861, in Nevada) was an American outlaw, reputed to have killed eleven men and often accused of being a coward and a bully, inclined to unprovoked violence when intoxicated.

Mark Twain mentions "Sam Brown" among 11 names of notorious killers in Nevada during the 1860s.

For a brief time, Sam Brown is alleged to have been the most notorious desperado in Virginia City. In the American West of that time, outlaws often used aliases and their exploits were often exaggerated by themselves and by tellers of tall tales. Newspaper accounts might have subordinated the truth to telling a good story, selling newspapers, and maintaining a good image for influential people, such as saloon keepers and lawyers.

According to Mark Twain,

In Nevada, for a time, the lawyer, the editor, the banker, the chief desperado, the chief gambler, and the saloon keeper, occupied the same level in society, and it was the highest.

According to Myron Angel's history, in defending his claim in Fiddletown, California in 1854, Sam Brown was convicted of killing three Chileans and wounding a fourth and served two years in San Quentin State Prison.

How Sam came to his end is a tale with many versions.

The accounts of Brown's death suggest that in celebrating his 30th birthday he became drunk and started a fight with Henry Van Sickles, who chased him on horseback and then shot him dead.
