= Bill Standifer =

J. William "Little Bill" Standifer (c. 1853 - October 4, 1903) was an American gunman and lawman of the Old West. He is best remembered for having been killed by noted and better known gunman John Higgins in 1903.

== Early life and notoriety ==
He was born J. William Standifer in Burnet County, Texas, and raised in Lampasas County, Texas, working cattle. By the age of 14, he was working regularly as a cowboy. That year, when he came across four men rustling cattle, he was pistol whipped by the men and badly hurt, but survived. Despite his youth, he tracked all four men, and killed them one by one. Although charges were pursued, he was acquitted.

In April 1879, Standifer was working as a cowboy on the Ike Mullins Ranch, in Tom Green County, Texas, where he came into contact with another cowboy, John McMahon, sometimes called John Mahon. The two found themselves involved in an argument when Standifer refused to allow McMahon to drive cattle across a pasture where Standifer was holding several head of Mullin's cattle. McMahon produced a bullwhip, while a companion pointed a rifle at Standifer, then McMahon began whipping Standifer. Both men were mounted, and Standifer was able to ride away to escape. Days later, Standifer tracked McMahon to a cattle camp near Pony Creek, located in Coleman County. As Standifer rode up, McMahon was mounted talking with several other cowboys. Upon seeing Standifer, McMahon drew his pistol and fired, but missed. Standifer drew and fired also, hitting McMahon in the wrist, causing his pistol to fall from his grip. McMahon spun his horse and galloped away, with Standifer in pursuit. The two made it about 600 yards from where the shootout began, with Standifer shooting McMahon again in the back, knocking him from his saddle. McMahon scrambled to his feet and attempted to run, but was again shot in the back, killing him.

Standifer fled, making it to Marfa, Texas, where he became involved in a saloon argument with three soldiers from Fort Davis, during which he shot and wounded two of them, before fleeing. Members of the Texas Rangers hunted Standifer down for the McMahon killing, and arrested him. However he was acquitted in a trial. Those shootings led to Standifer becoming known as a "gunman", and helped him in gaining employment as a Range Detective.

== Lawman career, feud with John Higgins ==
By the early 1880s, Standifer was working as a Range Detective, tracking down rustlers, and is known to have shot and killed at least one rustler near Estacado, Texas. When the demand for his services dwindled, Standifer ran and was elected as County Sheriff for Crosby County, Texas from 1888 through 1894. While serving as Sheriff, in 1891, he and Deputy Charlie Quillen pursued a group of Post Office thieves into Lincoln County, New Mexico, where they captured them.

On the return trip to Texas, while staying over at the VVN Ranch owned by George Neal, the outlaws attempted to overpower him and Deputy Quillen. The deputy was shot and wounded in the chest with his own rifle, but was able to wrestle the outlaw to the floor and overpower him. The shot had also wounded George Neal's wife. Standifer, who was outside tending the horses, heard the wife scream, and ran inside. Another of the outlaws had acquired Standifer's shotgun, but when Standifer entered, the shotgun misfired. Standifer beat the suspect into submission, then assisted Deputy Quillen. That same night he shackled all three outlaws, and rode with them and Quillen to the nearest doctor. Deputy Quillen survived, and the two were later able to take their prisoners on to Texas.

In 1893 he began working again as a Range Detective for large and prosperous ranches in the Texas Panhandle, mainly the powerful Spur Ranch, located in Spur, Texas, where he first met John "Pink" Higgins, a notable gunman already known to Standifer, since they were both from Lampasas, Texas. Standifer quickly gained a reputation for being an excellent tracker, and for always locating his prey. In June 1898, while tracking rustlers, Standifer arrived in Clairemont, Texas, a rough town at the time, and the location in which Jeff Hardin, brother to gunman John Wesley Hardin, had been shot and killed. Standifer located a rustler named Bob Kiggins there, but Kiggins refused to surrender, and in the gunfight that followed Standifer shot and killed Kiggins.

During this period, an animosity between Standifer and Higgins developed, one that has never truly been explained. It has been written that the Horrell Brothers, who were brought down mostly through the efforts of "Pink" Higgins, and who were distant kin to Standifer, were part of the problems between them. However, it is more likely that it was due to Higgins' son, Cullin, an attorney, who had represented Standifer's wife in her divorce from him. Fred Horsbrugh, manager of the Spur Ranch, fired both Higgins and Standifer due to the increasing hostilities between them. However, Horsbrugh allowed Higgins to stay on for a time after this, until he could find another job. This angered Standifer. In 1900, Standifer moved to Hartley County, Texas, where he was elected Sheriff.

At one point, just prior to Higgins leaving the Spur Ranch, he was dispatched to investigate a possible cattle rustling on a remote section of the ranch. Making a circular approach, Higgins spotted Standifer waiting in a group of trees. Rather than approach him, and knowing he was there to ambush him, Higgins simply went home. However, the animosity continued. On the morning of October 4, 1903, after having made comments that he would kill Higgins, Standifer rode out to Higgins' ranch. Higgins, seeing him from his house, rode out to meet him. Higgins' brother-in-law and daughter were standing on a hillside nearby, and witnessed what happened next. Standifer fired first, hitting Higgins' horse, which then jerked, causing Higgins' first shot to go wild. In the shooting exchange that followed, Standifer was shot and killed. Higgins' horse also died.

Higgins then retrieved another horse, and contacted Sheriff B. F. Roy, in Clairemont. When Higgins told Sheriff Roy that he believed he had killed Standifer, Sheriff Roy, who disliked Standifer for reasons unknown, stated "Well if you're not sure, you'd better go and finish the job". The shooting was ruled justifiable homicide, and Higgins was never arrested or tried. He buried Standifer himself, on the Higgins property, naming the thicket where he is buried "Standifer's Thicket".

Police appointments
Preceded by Felix Franklin	Sheriff of Crosby County, Texas; 1888–1894	Succeeded by J. C. Murphy
Preceded by Robert Oliver Neely	Sheriff of Hartley County, Texas; 1900–1903	Succeeded by Robert Lee Queen
