= Ned Christie's War =

Conflicts with lawmen, 1887–1892

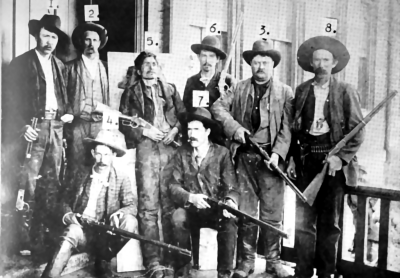
- Members of the posse that killed Ned Christie posing with his corpse in November 1892. 1) Paden Tolbert 2) Capt G.S White; 3) Coon Ratteree 4) Enoch Mills 5) Ned Christie {deceased}; 6) Thomas Johnson 7) Charles Copeland 8) Heck Bruner
- Date: 4 May 1887 – 2 November 1892
- Location: Cherokee Nation, Indian Territory
- Outcome: Ned Christie killed

Ned Christie's War is a phrase that has been used when referring to the overall confrontation between American lawmen and the Cherokee renegade Ned Christie. After Deputy Marshal Daniel Maples was shot to death in May 1887, Christie was accused of being responsible for the murder, so he fled to a remote area of the Cherokee Nation. For five years Christie eluded the posses that came after him, mostly with the help of friends and family. However, in November 1892 a well-armed force of lawmen breached his stronghold and killed him.

== War ==
=== Death of Daniel Maples ===
Before he became a renegade, Ned Christie was elected to the Cherokee tribal council in 1885. Like his father, who was also a member of the council, Ned was a blacksmith and gunsmith. Though newspapers and contemporary accounts claim that Christie was a typical bandit, or outlaw, there is no evidence to suggest that he ever committed a crime until after the Maples incident. The "war" began at Tahlequah, the capital of the Cherokee Nation, on May 4, 1887, with the killing of Deputy Daniel Maples. Maples had been sent in to arrest some whiskey peddlers, since alcohol was forbidden in the Indian Territory, but the deputy was ambushed and killed outside of town. A Cherokee man named John Parris was arrested for the murder, but he told the police that he saw Ned fire the gun that killed the officer. As a council member, Christie was in Tahlequah to attend a usual meeting so he proclaimed his innocence, saying he spent the night drinking and then fell asleep outside in some bushes. When the Hanging Judge, Isaac C. Parker, learned of the incident, he issued a warrant for Christie's arrest and sent out a posse from Fort Smith, Arkansas, under the command of Marshal Henry "Heck" Thomas. Christie was not about to surrender and be sentenced to hang in Judge Parker's court, so he fled to his cabin, which was located in a remote area of wilderness, about 15 miles (24 km) east of Tahlequah. Some accounts claim that Ned wrote Judge Parker a letter, which said that "he was innocent and requesting the right of bail to give him and the authorities time to find the real killer." Parker had no authority of the sort, so Christie "surrounded himself with an army of men and set up a heavily armed barricade around his home." He also placed sentries so that he could be warned of approaching lawmen long before they arrived.

=== First encounter ===
Deputy Marshal Henry "Heck" Thomas

Ned Christie

Deputy Marshal Paden Tolbert

For nearly two years Christie lived undisturbed with his friends and family in the wilderness. Marshal Thomas and other lawmen repeatedly led posses into the area, but usually they found Ned's house empty. According to author Loren D. Estleman, Ned slept at his cabin most nights, but he "took to the brush" when the alarm was raised. At the time, the Indian Territory was infested with outlaws. Banditry was common and every newspaper in the area accused Christie of being responsible for the raids, though he never left his hideout. There were occasional shootouts, though casualties remained light on both sides and all of the engagements took place at Christie's home. The first occurred on September 26, 1889. After months of searching, Marshal Thomas and a posse found Christie's cabin occupied by the renegade, as well as his wife and son. During the firefight that ensued, Christie was badly wounded in the face, and his son was shot and killed. One deputy, L.P. Isbel, was also wounded in the shoulder.

A November 8, 1890, edition of the Fort Worth Daily Gazette said the following about the skirmish:

A little over a year ago two deputy marshals [Thomas and Isbel] with a posse of five men surrounded his [Christie's] house just before daylight one morning and found him at home to their sorrow. They demanded his surrender and informed him that if he proposed to resist he had best send his family out as they intended to have him if they had to burn down the house. He answered them with a defiant yell, and they heard him ascending to the attic of the building, which was one story and built of logs, the gable ends only being weather boarded. Getting into the loft he kicked off a board and opened fire on the party, which they returned from every direction, each man having 'taken a tree.' Firing was kept up at intervals for some time without effect but finally one of the marshals [Isbel] exposed his shoulder and quick as a flash a Winchester ball went crashing through it, inflicting a wound that will make a cripple of the victim for life. This enraged the officers and they set fire to an outhouse hoping to scare out their game without burning the main building. In the meantime Christie's wife and son came out of the house and ran off, the boy being fired upon and wounded as he escaped into the brush. The outhouse burned rapidly and lit up the scene, soon spreading to the dwelling but the desperate Indian still held his fort [house] and answered the demands of the officers with shots and yells of defiance. By the time it was day light and the marshals fearing that Christie's wife had gone for help, and knowing that he had many relatives in the neighborhood, and it being apparent that he would die in the burning house before he would surrender if he had not already been shot, took their wounded comrade and retreated to where they had left their horses tied in the woods making their way to Tahlequah the same day. They afterwards learned that Christie was still in the burning building when they left and was wounded in the head but made his escape.

Another account of the fight says that the posse "surrounded Christie's shack at dawn and Christie was summoned to surrender," but "the only answer was a blast of rifle fire from Christie and a cohort." The same source says that Marshal Thomas set fire to an outbuilding and when Christie and his companion ran for safety both were wounded by gunfire. A shotgun slug tore off a piece of Christie's nose and hit one of his eyes while the other man was hit twice and killed.

=== Ned's Fort ===
Ned eventually went on to build a new home, which was more of a fort than his original cabin. According to Bill O'Neil, author of the Encyclopedia of Western Gunfighters:

After his home and shop were destroyed by a posse in 1889, he [Christie] rebuilt about a mile away on a forbidding cliff that became known as Ned's Fort Mountain. A field of fire was cleared around the two-story fortification. The massive walls were two logs thick and lined with oak two-by-fours.

It wasn't long before the fortifications were discovered. A November 3, 1890, edition of the Omaha Daily Bee said the following:

Ned Christie, the most distinguished outlaw within the Territory, unless it is Bill Pigeon, is receiving close attention of Deputy Marshals A.B. Ward and C.L. Howdon, says a Muskogee, I. T. [Indian Territory] special to the St. Louis Republican. Christie was a member of the Cherokee council, and about two years ago assassinated Deputy United States Marshal Dan Maples, from ambush, for some reason unknown. He at once took to the brush, where he has since been in hiding. About two weeks ago the above named officers learned that Christie was located about fifteen miles northwest of Tahlequah, and they proceeded to his rendezvous with a posse or two. The outlaw, it was discovered, had with him seven pals and brother desperadoes. These men have built two 'fort' houses, arranged on an elevation commanding favorable view, and from which forts the inmates have a cross-fire on the only approach to their stronghold. The officers were warned, and after a consultation quietly withdrew, it is believed to make a subsequent attack when the odds are in their favor.

There were several shootouts in the time between the construction of Christie's fort and the end of the conflict in 1892, three of which stand out among the others. The first was fought on November 25, 1890, shortly after authorities in Washington, D.C. issued a $1,000 reward for Christie, dead or alive. The African-American lawman Bass Reeves accepted the challenge and led a failed expedition to capture the elusive renegade.

On November 27, 1890, the newspaper Vinita Indian Chieftain wrote a brief account of the attack and its aftermath:

On Tuesday last U.S. Deputy Marshal Bass Reeves, of Fort Smith, with his posse, made an attack on the home of Ned Christie in the Flint district, who is perhaps the most notorious outlaw and desperado in the Indian Territory, and the outlaw's stronghold was burned to the ground. Supposing that the owner [Christie] had been killed or wounded and was consumed in the building, the news went out that he had met a violent death. But Christie has turned up alive, and may cause trouble yet, is said to be on the war path fiercer than ever and vows revenge on the marshal and his posse.

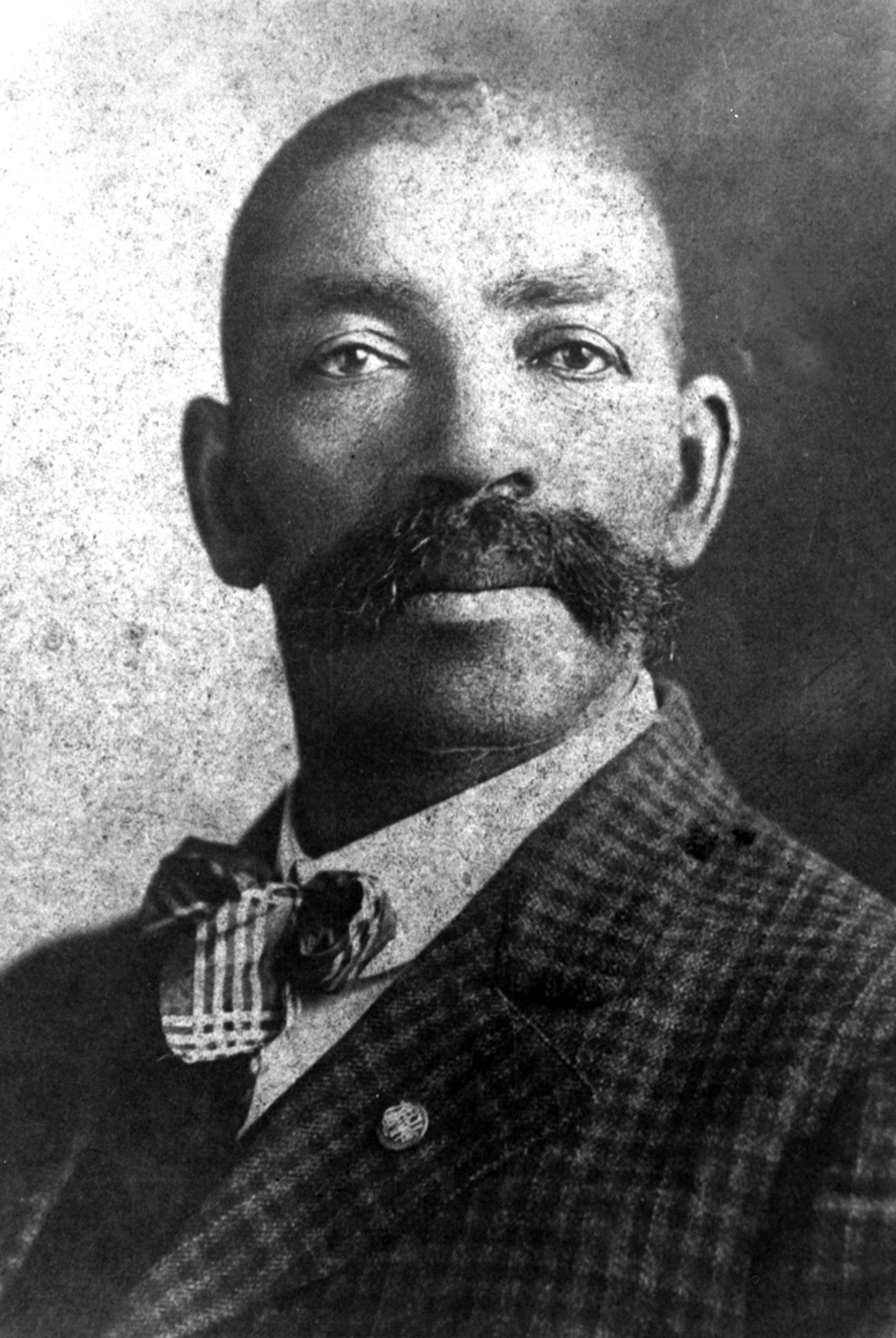
Bass Reeves

Reeves was reported to have been killed not long after the encounter. Some newspapers claimed that Ned was responsible while others said that Christie's involvement was a hoax, being that Reeves was ambushed well over 100 miles (160 km) from the Going Snake District, where Christie lived (In fact Reeves lived until 1910). Whether Ned's fort was truly burned down by Reeves and his men will never be known, but what is certain is that the fort was still standing and still in use when later posses attempted to arrest the renegade. On October 11, 1892, a posse composed of Deputy Marshals Charley Copeland, Milo Creekmore, William Bouden, David Rusk, and D.C. Dye attacked the fort but they were quickly driven back into the bushes with two wounded. The posse then found a wagon, used in the construction of the buildings, and began loading it with brush so they could light it on fire and then send it rolling towards the house. However, the plan did not go as hoped. The wagon rolled off course and into an outbuilding. The deputies then decided on using the three sticks of dynamite they had brought with them. One by one, the sticks were thrown, but each one "bounced harmlessly onto the ground." Disgusted, the posse had no choice but to retreat.

=== Final encounter ===
The final battle to capture or kill Ned Christie began on November 2, 1892, and ended early the following morning. This time, the posse consisted of between sixteen and twenty-five men, heavily armed with rifles, dynamite and a 3-pounder field gun. Several men have been credited with leading the posse, including Deputy Marshals Gideon S. "Cap" White, Gus York, Dick Bruce, Heck Bruner and Paden Tolbert. Some of the possemen were veterans of earlier skirmishes, so they knew what to expect when the fighting began. Christie, Arche Wolfe, and possibly a man named Charley Hare, took up positions in the top of the fort, where they held off the attackers for over twelve hours. One account says that the lawmen fired thirty-eight cannonballs into the fort, and over 2,000 rounds of rifle ammunition was expended. The cannon proved to be useless though, so the deputies planted dynamite at a certain place along the wall and then lit the fuse. The explosion blew a hole large enough for men to pass through, and it also set the building on fire. Arche Wolfe escaped, but was later caught, and Christie was shot down at point blank range by Deputy Wess Bowman, when he charged out of the burning building. Immediately after that, the son of Deputy Maples, Sam, came up and emptied his revolver into Christie's corpse. According to author Dan Anderson, Charley Hare came out with his hands up and surrendered; he was badly burned and could no longer resist or evade capture. Other accounts make no mention of Charley Hare, though The Morning Call, a San Francisco newspaper, reported on November 4, 1892, that a man named Charles Wolff was killed during the fight and that his body was found badly burned inside Ned's fort.

The article from The Morning Call reads as follows:

Tahlequa, I. T., Nov. 4.—Ned Christy, a noted outlaw for whom the officers have been searching for some time, was killed to–day. A posse of United States Deputy Marshals headed by Dick Bruce surrounded his cabin this morning. When one of Christy's companions came out he was summoned to surrender, but replied with a shot from a Winchester [rifle], and his companions in the house also fired a volley. Then began a battle which lasted all day without damage on either side. This evening the officers resorted to dynamite and succeeded in blowing down a part of the cabin and setting fire to the remainder. While the blaze was at its height Christy tried to escape, and, failing to halt when ordered, was brought to the ground riddled with bullets. His companion gave himself up. The body of Charles Wolff, who was wounded in the morning, was burned to a crisp in the cabin. The females of the family had been allowed to retreat at the beginning of the fight.

== Aftermath ==
Marshal Tolbert had Christie's body strapped to the door of the fort and then loaded it into a wagon for the ride to Fayetteville and then to Fort Smith by train. Along the way, curious citizens flocked to the roads and train stations to view Christie's remains. The door to which Christie was attached allowed the deputies to prop him up against buildings so photographs could be taken. After Fort Smith, Christie's body was sent to Fort Gibson to be identified by his family and to be buried, but the remains were later moved to the Watt Christie Cemetery in Wauhillau, Oklahoma.

There is some reason to believe that Christie may have been the victim of framing by a railroad company, being that he was a tribal council member, who was opposed to the construction of railroads through Cherokee land. In 1918, a witness to the murder of Daniel Maples came forward and effectively cleared Christie's name. Richard A. "Dick" Humphrey was a former slave, who was adopted into the Cherokee tribe and was working as a blacksmith in Tahlequah the night Maples was killed. Humphrey told the former deputy marshal and reporter for the Oklahoman, Fred E. Sutton, that he saw a known badman named Bud Trainor steal Christie's coat while he slept drunk in the bushes and then use it to conceal his identity for the murder of Maples. Humphrey was too afraid to come forward sooner because of what Trainor or his friends might have done.

Today, Christie is honored by a plaque at the Cherokee Court House in Tahlequah, which says that he was "assassinated by U.S. Marshals in 1892." Several descendants of Ned, or his family, still live in the Cherokee Nation.

== See also ==
- Goingsnake Massacre
- Three Guardsmen
- Zeke and Ned

== Bibliography ==
- Conley, Robert J. (2002). Ned Christie's War. Macmillan. ISBN 9781429933063.
- Estleman, Loren D. (2009). The Branch and the Scaffold. Macmillan. ISBN 9780765315991.
- McMurtry, Larry; Diana Ossana (2002). Zeke and Ned. Simon and Schuster. ISBN 9780743230179.
- O'Neil, Bill (1991). Encyclopedia of Western Gunfighters. University of Oklahoma Press. ISBN 9780806123356.
- Anderson, Dan; Laurence J. Yadon (2007). One hundred Oklahoma outlaws, gangsters, and lawmen, 1839-1939. Pelican Publishing. ISBN 9781589803848.
- Burton, Art T. (2008). Black Gun, Silver Star: The Life and Legend of Frontier Marshal Bass Reeves. University of Nebraska Press. ISBN 9780803217478.
- Elman, Robert (1975). Badmen of the West. The Ridge Press, Inc. ISBN 0-600-31353-0.
