= Texas Jack =

Texas Jack may refer to:

== People ==
- Texas Jack Omohundro (1846–1880), scout, actor, cowboy
- Texas Jack Jr. (c. 1860–1905), sharpshooter, wild west show owner, made Will Rogers into an entertainer, adopted son of Omohundro
- Texas Jack Vermillion (1842–1911), Old West gunfighter
- Nathaniel Reed (outlaw) (1862–1950), American outlaw
- Dick "Texas Jack" Broadwell, 19th-century American outlaw and member of the Dalton Gang

== Arts and entertainment ==
- Texas Jack (film), a 1935 American western film
- Texas Jack, a character in the film The Great Race
- "Texas Jack", an episode of The Abbott and Costello Cartoon Show

== Other uses ==
- Texas Jack's, the retail store of US firearms importer Cimarron Firearms
