= Paden Tolbert =

- Born: 1863 or 1870; Griffin, Georgia
- Died: April 24, 1904 (aged 34); Weleetka, Oklahoma
- Spouse: Lucy Rose Turner (4 children)
- Police career
- Country: United States
- Department: U.S. Marshal
- Service years: c. 1892 – 1909
- Rank: Deputy U.S. Marshal
- Other work: Railroad agent

Paden Tolbert (c. 1863 or 1870 – April 24, 1904) was a 19th-century American law enforcement officer and railroad agent. He was one of the leading deputy U.S. Marshals in the Indian Territory during the 1880s and 90s and often worked with other well-known lawmen of his time including Bud Ledbetter, Heck Thomas and Bill Tilghman. He and his brother John Tolbert were both deputy marshals under "The Hanging Judge" Isaac C. Parker.

One of many young deputies first used by Judge Parker in the U.S. District Courts in Fort Smith and Muskogee, Tolbert was part of a legendary generation of U.S. Marshals that also included J. H. Mershon, A. J. Trail, Heck Bruner, Sam Sixkiller, Wes Bowman and Bass Reeves. A reputation for courage and devotion to service, Marshal Leo E. Bennett stated that he considered Tolbert to be "one of the bravest men that he ever had on the force".

Tolbert and G. S. "Cap" White led the posse that was sent from Fort Smith to apprehend Ned Christie in the third and final attempt to force him from his mountain fortress. The siege lasted two days and involved dynamite and a cannon to destroy the hideout; this was the only time a cannon was used on civilians by American law enforcement officers. Tolbert and Ledbetter are also credited with foiling the infamous 1894 train robbery at Blackstone Switch, which led to the capture of Nathaniel "Texas Jack" Reed and his gang, as well as the capture of the Jennings Gang in 1899.

As well as having the town of Paden, Oklahoma, named in his honor, his family were the first to introduce Elberta peaches to Clarksville, Arkansas and for which the city remains famous.

== Biography ==
=== Early life ===
The eldest of eight children born to James Russell Tolbert and Elizabeth Miller, Paden Tolbert grew up in Griffin, Georgia, during Reconstruction. The Tolbert family had been well off prior to the American Civil War, his father James had graduated from the University of Georgia and studied law in Tennessee before becoming a journalist. His family lived in Macon and Atlanta during the war while his father reported for the Atlanta Constitution and afterwards tried his hand at farming in Pike County but was unsuccessful at it. In 1880, his father sold the family estate in Griffin and traveled by train to Clarksville, Arkansas where he became successful in growing peach trees and introducing the Elberta peach.

Tolbert became a schoolmaster in Johnson County for a time before pursuing a career as a law enforcement officer. He traveled to Fort Smith and, at age 22, became a deputy U.S. Marshal under "The Hanging Judge" Isaac C. Parker. Prior to this, he had married his childhood sweetheart Lucy Rose Turner and moved their family to the Indian Territory shortly after becoming a deputy marshal. His brother John would also become a deputy marshal at Fort Smith and the two would briefly work together. Another deputy he was partnered with was Bud Ledbetter who together hunted down many notorious outlaws in the Indian Territory.

=== Siege of Ned's Fort Mountain ===
Tolbert and deputy marshal G. S. "Cap" White led the 16-man posse who rode after Ned Christie, amongst whom were Heck Thomas, Bud Ledbetter and his brother John Tolbert, after Christie was charged with the murder of deputy marshal Daniel Maples. While the rest of the posse stocked up on extra weapons including rifles, revolvers and small-arms ammunition, Tolbert traveled over 250 miles to Coffeyville, Kansas and brought back a cannon that fired three-pound shells.

On the morning of November 2, 1894, Tolbert and the rest of the posse surrounded the near impregnable wooden fortress known as the "Rabbit Trap" in the Going Snake District, a mountainous region of the Cherokee nation (near present-day Talequah, Oklahoma). Christie had successfully fought off previous attempts to apprehend him for well over a year before their arrival. After cannon fire and over 2,000 bullets fired at the double-tiered log fortification proved ineffective, it seemed that this would again be the case.

As night fell, Tolbert and the others set to work on building a portable barricade. Using the charred rear axle and wheels from the burned out lumber wagon used to assault the fort the previous month, they built and mounted a thick wall from scrap-oak timbers and loaded with rails. Finally, six sticks of dynamite was brought out and used to breach the fort's walls. Sometime near midnight, Tolbert helped push the wagon towards the cabin along with White, Charley Copeland, Bill Ellis and Bill Smith. While Christie and his partner attempted to fight off Paden's group from the second story gunports, the rest of the posse provided covering fire until the men were close enough to dynamite the south wall of the house. Although surviving the explosion, Christie made a run for the surrounding woods but was gunned down by Tolbert and others.

=== Shootout with Texas Jack Reed ===
Two years later, Tolbert and several other U.S. Marshals were contacted by the American Express Company to request protection because they had received information of a suspected holdup from one of their agents in Dallas. On November 13, 1894, Tolbert and Ledbetter were aboard the express car along with Sid Johnson, Frank Jones and as many as three Pinkerton detectives. The train was moving at top speed when it was stopped by Nathaniel "Texas Jack" Reed and his gang. Although calling on the lawmen to get out of the express car, Tolbert and the others refused to surrender and instead began firing at them. The gunfight continued for over an hour and a half until one of Reed's men, Charley Belstead, was killed. Reed then ran towards the passenger car, carrying dynamite with him, and tried to blow the express car. Failing this, he instead held up the passenger car. Erroneously reported killed as he and his men made their getaway, Reed was nevertheless wounded by Ledbetter. The failure of this attack resulted in a manhunt for the fugitives and the eventual capture of Reed.

=== Capture of the Jenning Gang and later life ===
In mid-July 1897, Tolbert and Ledbetter again rode together to bring in members of the Jennings Gang, brothers Alan and Frank Jennings. During their search, they learned that "Al Jennings and other parties ... who were going about in the Northern District of the Indian Territory under assumed names". Tolbert and Ledbetter were sent after them with a warrant for their robbery of a post office at Foyll in Cherokee territory. They stayed on their trail for some time before tracking them to the Spike S ranch and, along with several others, surrounded the hideout. After a brief gunfight, they chased them a distance of 60 miles before apprehending them together with Pat and Morris O'Malley.

After a successful 12-year career, Tolbert retired and became a special officer for the Fort Smith and Western Railroad. After only a few months, he became ill from congestion of the lungs and was sent to Hot Springs, Arkansas, to recover. However, his condition did not improve and he died in Weleetka, Oklahoma on April 24, 1904 and was buried in Oakland Cemetery near Clarksville, Arkansas four days later. Following his death, his widow was appointed honorary postmistress of Paden, a town in the Indian Territory named after her husband.
