= Ned Christie =

Cherokee leader (1852–1892)

- ᏁᏕᏩᏕ (Cherokee)
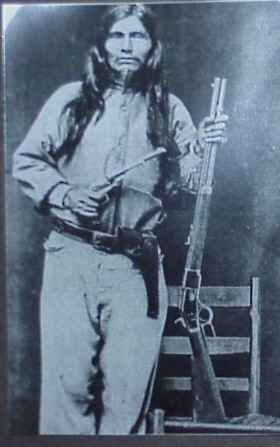
- Ned Christie
- Born: ᏁᏕᏩᏕ (NeDe WaDe); December 14, 1852; Wauhillau, Indian Territory, U.S.
- Died: November 3, 1892 (aged 39); Wauhillau, Indian Territory, U.S.
- Cause of death: Gunshot wound
- Occupations: Blacksmith; gunsmith
- Spouse: Multiple
- Parent(s): Watt Christie and Lydia "Thrower" Christie

Ned Christie (December 14, 1852 – November 3, 1892), also known as NeDe WaDe (ᏁᏕᏩᏕ), was a Cherokee statesman. Christie was a member of the executive council in the Cherokee Nation senate, and served as one of three advisers to Principal Chief Dennis Bushyhead. A member of the Keetoowah Society, Christie supported Cherokee sovereignty and tried to resist white encroachment.

In 1887, he was accused of killing a United States Marshal in ambush. Christie sought bail in order to prove his innocence, but was refused. He is notable for having evaded and held off for five years United States lawmen seeking his capture, in what was later called Ned Christie's War. He was declared an outlaw, with a reward on his head, and the case was sensationalized by newspapers. He was eventually killed by lawmen. A 1918 report by an eyewitness to the marshal's murder said that Christie had been wrongfully accused. He became a folk hero among the Cherokee.

== Early life ==
Christie was born in 1852 at Wauhillau, Goingsnake District, Cherokee Nation, in what is the present-day state of Oklahoma. He was the son of Watt and Lydia (Thrower) Christie, who survived the Trail of Tears and removal from the American Southeast to Indian Territory. They were of the Keetowah band, one of the most traditional of Cherokee peoples.

As a child and young man, Christie was a marble champion, stickball player, and a popular fiddle player. He became literate in both Cherokee and English, but no writings by him have been found.

== Marriage and family ==
One source says that Christie first married Nannie Dick about 1871, but the burial registry of the Watt Christie Cemetery notes her as his father's fifth wife. (Note: Nannie Dick's burial registry at the Christie Cemetery says that she lived from about 1848 until April 1882, and that she was his father Watt Christie's fifth wife.) Christie is recorded as marrying Peggy Tucker in 1875. He next married Jennie Scraper (about 1877). Last, he married Nancy Greece (about 1888).

== Work and political career ==
Christie was a big man at 6 feet 4 inches (1.93 m), and became a blacksmith and gunsmith. In 1885, he was elected to the tribal Senate and he was an advisor to the Principal Chief. Concerned about trying to protect Cherokee national sovereignty, Christie strongly opposed giving the federal government land to construct railroads through their territory. In addition, federal legislators were proposing forcing the Cherokee and other tribes to end their practice of holding communal land, and to force them to accept allotment of the tribal lands to individual households.

The Dawes Act was passed in February 1887 to begin that process of breaking up tribal communal lands. It was part of a renewed push by whites for Native Americans to assimilate and adopt European-American practices. In addition, whites were encroaching on Cherokee and other Native American lands in Indian Territory as squatters and beginning to press the federal government to establish a state in this area. Cherokee and other Indian land titles would first have to be extinguished to accomplish that, which would take place by implementation of the Dawes Act. Because the Five Civilized Tribes had their own territories rather than reservations in Indian Territory, they were excluded from the beginning implementation of allotment.

But Christie's opposition to such positions, which were supported by powerful whites in the region and in the East, became known. He began to earn some enemies, particularly as he was regarded as a leader among his people.

Christie was a member of the Keetoowah Society, which was based on traditional religion. His father, Watt, and grandfather (Lacy Christie), were chiefs of their ceremonial ground, where sacred rituals were performed, near the family home at Wauhillau (present-day Adair County, Oklahoma).

Although well-regarded by fellow Cherokee, Christie was said to have a hot temper, especially after drinking whiskey. He was charged with manslaughter in the 1885 death of William Palone, another Cherokee. Tried in the tribal court at Tahlequah, Christie was found not guilty and released. According to a 2018 biography by Devon A. Mihesuah, newspapermen and dime novel writers played up these elements of his life in Wild West lore to create sensational accounts and sell their writings, particularly in the period when he evaded federal marshals. She describes these as "libelous stories."

== Ambush of Daniel Maples ==
On May 3, 1887, U.S. Deputy Marshal Daniel Maples led a posse into Indian Territory seeking sellers of illegal whiskey, which had been made a federal crime in that territory. (Note: Selling whiskey in Indian Territory was a federal crime; this region was under the jurisdiction of the United States Court of the Western District of Arkansas in Fort Smith.) A principal suspect was Bud Trainer, who had a record for selling whiskey and was known for violence. After spending the day unsuccessfully seeking Trainer, Maples and posse member George Jefferson started back to their camp near Spring Branch Creek, outside Tahlequah. Maples was shot from ambush in the territory of the Cherokee Nation and died the next day of his wounds. The shooter had escaped.

== "Ned Christie's War" ==
According to Frates's account, the other marshals suspected that Trainer had shot Maples, and began arresting his associates. Christie was accused of the murder by John Parris, a companion who had been arrested. Parris told authorities that Christie had fired the shot that killed Maples. But Christie was said to have been drinking with friends when the shooting occurred.

Friends convinced Christie to hide. Fearing a trial before white people in a U.S. court, Christie fortified his home to resist arrest. Christie's home was in the Rabbit Trap community of the Goingsnake District in the Cherokee Nation, where he lived with his wife, Nancy Greece, and their 13-year-old son James Greece.

He learned that he had been indicted by a grand jury of the United States Court of the Western District of Arkansas in Fort Smith for Maples' murder and that Judge Isaac C. Parker had sent more marshals to arrest him. Reportedly, he wrote a letter to Judge Parker, saying that he was willing to surrender if Parker would promise to release him on bail so that he could look for evidence to prove his innocence. According to one account, Parker did not believe he could comply with that request; at any rate, he never responded to the letter. Christie never surrendered to the court.

Judge Parker was known for handling some sensational cases. Because of his tough stands and his sentencing of many criminals to death and was known as "the hanging judge." But he also worked to rehabilitate offenders, reform the criminal justice system, and advocate the rights of the Indian nations in the territory.

In 1889, Jacob Yoes was appointed as the U.S. Marshal in Fort Smith. Yoes assigned his top deputy, Heck Thomas, to lead the effort to bring in Christie. Thomas was assisted by Deputy Marshall L. P. Isbell of Vinita, two other marshals, and the notorious Bud Trainer. In an attack in 1889, lawmen burned Christie's house to the ground, but Christie escaped with friends, although he was wounded by a gunshot. Christie never went to trial.

Deputy Thomas decided to burn Christie out: the marshals set fire to Christie's blacksmith shop and flames spread to the cabin. Christie's wife and his 18-year-old nephew, Little Arch Wolf (also spelled Wolfe), escaped the cabin but his nephew was wounded by gunfire. Believing that Christie had been killed, Heck and the posse left the scene to get medical attention for Isbell. Nancy Christie returned to the burned-out cabin and found her husband wounded but alive. She took him and his nephew to a local white doctor. The doctor and a Cherokee medicine man saved the lives of Christie and Wolf. According to Frates, at this point, Christie swore that he would never surrender.

Christie and his friends built a fort for protection. The fort was double-walled with logs and had sand packed between the two walls. It also had gun ports for rifles and was amply stocked with food, water and ammunition to withstand a siege. During this time, the U.S. Government increased the reward for Christie's capture from $500 to $1000. Sensational coverage of Christie continued.

In October 1892, Marshal Yoes sent a posse of six deputies to Christie's known location. This group withdrew after two men were wounded in a firefight. Yoes proposed a military-style raid on the fort. It was led by Deputy Gideon S. “Cap” White, a former captain in the U.S. Cavalry during the Civil War. Gus York, a civilian who was familiar with the territory, was hired to assist White, along with 14 other men. An army post in Kansas agreed to loan White a cannon for the expedition.

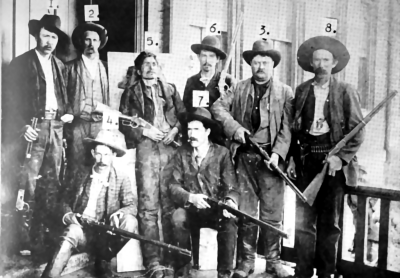
Photograph of US Deputy Marshals posing with the corpse of Ned Christie in November 1892. (1) Paden Tolbert (2) Capt. G.S. White (3) Coon Ratteree (4) Enoch Mills (5) deceased Ned Christie (6) Thomas Johnson (7) Charles Copeland (8) Heck Bruner

White's force surrounded the Christie fort on the morning of November 3, 1892. In addition to Christie, others at the fort included his wife Nancy, her son Albert, Ned's daughter, Mary; his granddaughter, Charlotte; nephew Little Arch Wolf, and Charles Hair, a 12-year-old Cherokee. After the first exchange of rifle fire, the marshals allowed the women to leave, and held them elsewhere.

The posse of lawmen killed Christie in their attack. The lawmen loaded a double charge of powder into the cannon for more power, but the next shot blew up the barrel. They pushed a wagon load of dynamite against one wall of the fort and detonated it. The explosion destroyed part of the fort and set the rest afire. Christie was fatally shot as he escaped the burning ruins.

They tied his body to a door for transport by train to Fayetteville, Arkansas. There the lawmen were photographed with Christie's body as a trophy, as was common in those times. They transported the body by train to Fort Smith, Arkansas, to claim their reward from the US court. More people had their pictures taken next to Christie's body. The Cook photography studio took a photo to reproduce and sell as postcards.

Christie's body was finally released by authorities to his family. They returned with it to Wauhillau for burial. The body was interred at his father's Watt Christie Cemetery in Wauhillau. Its location is marked by a tombstone.

The government's pressure on the Cherokee continued. After the raid, Christie's nephew Arch Wolfe and the youth Charles Hair were each charged and convicted of assault and intent to kill a lawman. Because of his age, Hair was sentenced to three years in the State Reformatory in Illinois. It was far from his people. Wolfe was held for years in penal institutions. He was finally committed to the Canton Indian Insane Asylum in South Dakota, which opened in 1903 and was often used to house Indians considered troublemakers. Wolfe died there in 1912. Run by officials with no background in psychiatric care, the asylum had refused to allow Wolfe any contact with his family or to give them information about him.

In 1918, Dick Humphreys, a freedman, gave an interview to the Daily Oklahoman in which he said he had been an eyewitness to the shooting of Marshal Maples. He said that Bud Trainer shot the lawman, not Christie. Humphreys had not volunteered his information earlier because he feared retaliation by Trainer. (Note: Bud Trainer was killed in Vinita in 1896 by a group of four men. They were thought to have argued over a whiskey deal that had gone bad.)

Christie's name was cleared at last, years after he was brutally killed. The Keetoowah leader had opposed allowing railroad development, allotment in Indian Territory, and statehood for the area, as he resisted encroachment by European Americans. Some researchers believe that his opposition to the powerful men promoting development there may have contributed to his being falsely accused of Maples' murder and pursued as an outlaw.

== Legacy and honors ==
Today Christie is honored by a plaque at the Cherokee Court House in Tahlequah, Oklahoma, the oldest public building in the state. The memorial reads that he was "assassinated by U. S. Marshals in 1892." The Fort Smith National Historic Site, operated by the National Park Service, also has material recognizing Christie's death as an assassination.

Many articles about Christie were published in newspapers and western magazines, in addition to dime novels; most at the time sensationalized his life.

Christie has also been the subject of late 20th-century novels, such as Larry McMurtry and Diane Ossana's Zeke and Ned (1997) and Robert J. Conley's Ned Christie's War (1991). The latter Cherokee author had a particular interest in trying to portray Christie's struggles.

In the 21st century, Christie has been the subject of carefully researched histories, including Devon A. Mihesuah's biography Ned Christie. The Creation of an Outlaw and Cherokee Hero (2018), published by University of Oklahoma Press. It provides more information about the context of Christie's times and his political stands. He Was a Brave Man: The Story of an Indian Patriot (2010) was written by Lisa LaRue, Cherokee Keetoowah historian. Christie's great-great-nephew, Roy J. Hamilton, also wrote and self-published a history, titled Ned Christie: Cherokee Warrior.
