= Davenport Mountain =

Mountain in Georgia, United States

Coordinates: 34.9220290°N 84.0929676°W

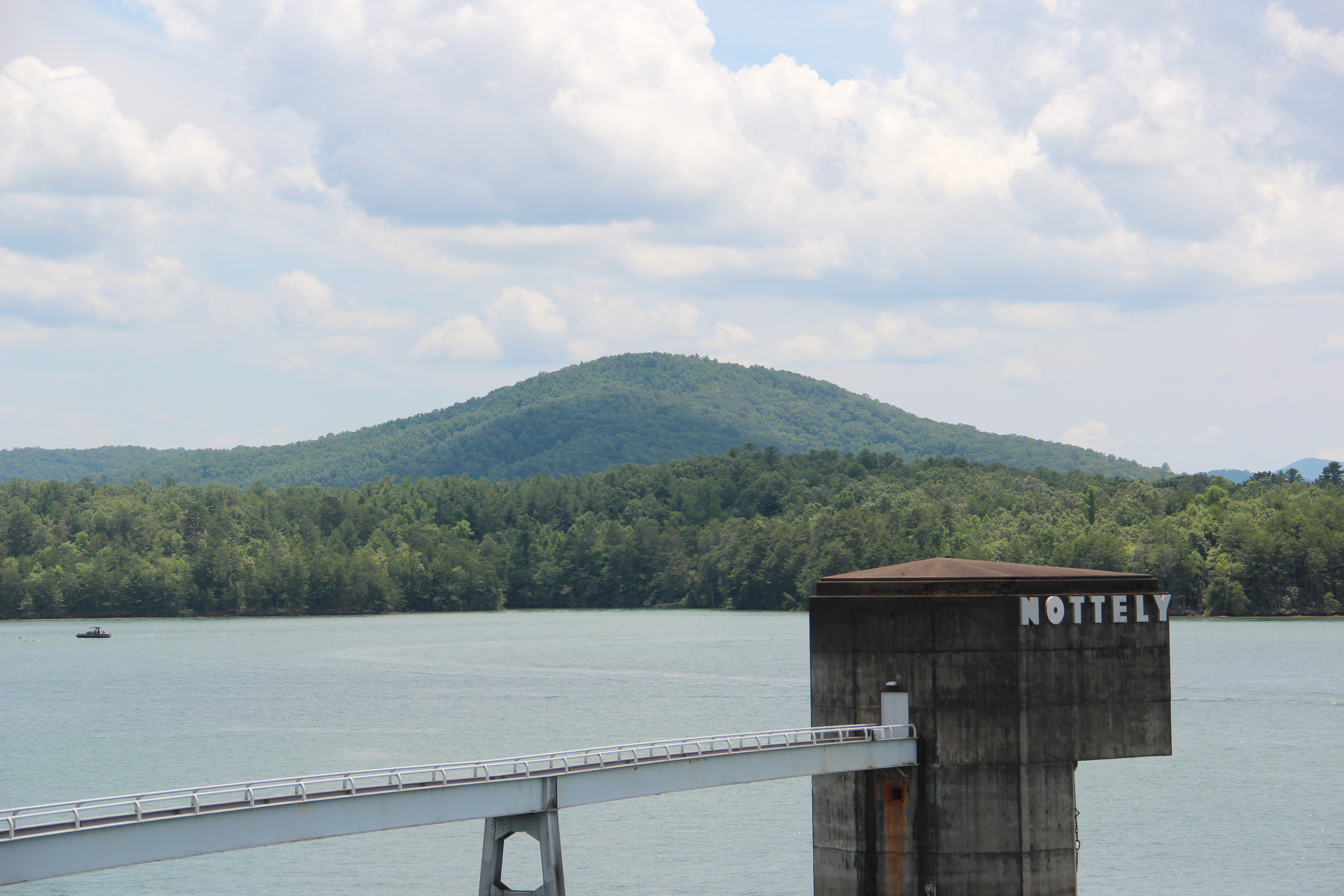
Davenport Mountain from Nottely Dam

Davenport Mountain is a summit in the U.S. state of Georgia. The elevation is 2,077 feet (633 m).

Davenport Mountain was named after John Davenport, a pioneer citizen of the 1830s.
