= Nathaniel Reed (outlaw) =

19th and 20th-century American gunman

- A photograph of Reed which appeared on the title page of his 1936 autobiography The Life of Texas Jack
- Born: March 23, 1862; Madison County, Arkansas, United States
- Died: January 7, 1950 (aged 87); Tulsa, Oklahoma
- Other name: Texas Jack Reed
- Known for: Outlaw and train robber in the Indian Territory during the 1880s and 1890s

Nathaniel "Texas Jack" Reed (March 23, 1862 – January 7, 1950) was a 19th-century American outlaw responsible for many stagecoach, bank, and train robberies throughout the American Southwest during the 1880s and 1890s. He acted on his own and also led a bandit gang, operating particularly in the Rocky Mountains and Indian Territory.

Reed is claimed to have been the last survivor of the "47 most notorious outlaws" of the Indian Territory. He became an evangelist in his later years, and could often be seen on the streets of Tulsa preaching against the dangers of following a "life of crime". His memoirs were published in the 1930s, and are considered valuable collector's items (one copy was reportedly sold on the internet for $1,500 in 2007). He claimed to have ridden with the Dalton Gang, Bill Doolin, Henry Starr, and other outlaws and bandits of the old west. He may have also helped Cherokee Bill, a fellow outlaw from the Indian Territory, in his escape from Fort Smith during the 1880s.

As with many others of the era, Reed's colorful stories of his almost 10-year career as an outlaw were probably exaggerated both by himself and by later writers. He claimed to have ridden briefly with the Daltons, and participated in their dual bank robberies in Coffeyville, Kansas in 1892 as well as in the infamous 1893 gunfight at Ingalls. However, there is no corroborating evidence that he was involved in either of those events.

== Biography ==
=== Early life ===
Reed was born in Madison County, Arkansas. His father, Mason Henry Reed, was killed in action fighting for the Union Army during the American Civil War, probably at the Battle of Campbell's Station on November 16, 1863. His mother was Sarah Elizabeth Prater. Reed lived with a number of relatives, including his maternal grandparents, until 1883 when, at the age of 21, he moved to the American frontier. He worked at various jobs in Idaho, Wyoming, Colorado, and Texas until he reached what is now Oklahoma, where he became a ranch hand for the Tarry outfit.

During the summer of 1885, his foreman recruited him to rob a train at La Junta, Colorado. In the course of the robbery, Reed entered the passenger car firing his pistol to keep the passengers under control. He later received $6,000 for his part in the hold-up. Encouraged by this success, Reed gave up working as a cowboy and became an outlaw. During the next nine years he and his gang robbed trains, stagecoaches, and banks, and on one occasion captured a large shipment of bullion in California.

=== Robbery at Blackstone Switch ===
During the early 1890s, when he was living near Muskogee, Oklahoma, Reed learned that a gold shipment was leaving Dallas, Texas on November 13, 1894. He recruited Buz Luckey, William "Will" Smith, and Tom Root, and selected Blackstone Switch at Wybark as the site of the robbery. The plan was for Reed to throw the switch as the train approached, then, as it entered onto a sidetrack, the gang would use dynamite to enter the express car. Root, a full-blooded Cherokee known for his size and strength, would enter the express car, break open the strongboxes, and bring out the gold. Smith would hold a gun on the engineer and fireman while Luckey stayed with the horses.

Despite a practice staged robbery the previous day, as the Katy No. 2 approached, Reed threw the switch too early. Engineer Joseph Hotchkiss stopped the train when he saw the signal light change, far short of the siding. Reed and the others were forced to run towards the train yelling and shooting. Hotchkiss and the fireman alerted the passengers using the bell cord connected to the car and jumped off the train to hide in a small ravine nearby.

The railroad company had anticipated the possibility of a robbery, and had moved the gold to another train, putting in its place several armed passengers to guard the express car including Bud Ledbetter, Paden Tolbert, Sid Johnson, and Frank Jones. When Reed and the others approached the express car, he called for the passengers to leave the car. When they refused, Reed and Root took cover behind some trees and began shooting into the car. The passengers returned fire, resulting in a gunfight that lasted for nearly an hour. Eventually one of Reed's men was killed; Reed jumped onto the train and went through the passenger cars forcing passengers to put their valuables into a sack before he and his gang fled.

As they rode away, Reed was shot by Bud Ledbetter; the pain from his wound grew so severe that his partners were forced to leave him behind for the night. He gave them some of his loot, and kept the rest of it in a sack to use as a pillow. He lay on a blanket hiding under a rock ledge until he was found by an Indian woman, who nursed him back to health.

The American Express Company offered a reward of $250 for the arrest and conviction of each member of the gang. An extensive manhunt was conducted by U.S. Marshals George Crump and S. Morton Rutherford, and large groups of deputies were sent into the Indian Territory and Creek Nation. While burning the canebrakes in the Verdigris bottoms, one deputy found the burnt remains of Reed's saddle and threatened to destroy the crops of local residents if they did not turn over Reed and his men. This was considered a legal act, authorized by "The Hanging Judge" Isaac C. Parker himself, but no one came forward with information. Reed was warned of the search and decided to leave the territory as soon as he was able. He arrived in Seneca, Missouri on December 9, where Bill Lawrence took care of him.

Once fully recovered from his wounds Reed returned to Arkansas in February 1895, where he stayed with his brother in Madison County. Having decided to retire from a life of crime, he wrote to Judge Parker, agreeing to testify against the man who planned the robbery in exchange for probation, although he did not participate in the proceedings. Smith managed to disappear, but U.S. Marshal Newton LaForce was successful in tracking down Luckey and Root to the latter's home in Broken Arrow, 15 miles south of Tulsa, Oklahoma. The two fugitives were subsequently killed in a gunfight with LaForce and his men on December 4, 1894.

=== Later years ===
Despite Parker's promise of immunity, Reed was convicted and sentenced to serve five years in prison. However, he served less than one, as shortly before his own death Parker granted Reed his parole, in November 1896. Reed subsequently carried his signed parole from Judge Parker around with him, along with a letter signed by Ledbetter acknowledging that Ledbetter had shot him.

After his release Reed became an evangelist, preaching the rewards of living a respectable, law-abiding life. He also toured the country with a series of Wild West shows. His memoirs, The Life of Texas Jack, were published in 1936, and 35,000 copies of several published pamphlets and dime novels describing his life as an outlaw were sold before his death at home in Tulsa, Oklahoma, in 1950, at the age of 87. He was buried in St. Paul, Arkansas.
