= The Passing of the Oklahoma Outlaws =

1915 film

- Theatrical release poster
- Directed by: Bill Tilghman
- Produced by: Eagle Film Company
- Cinematography: Benny Kent
- Release date: 1915
- Country: United States
- Languages: Silent; English intertitles

The Passing of the Oklahoma Outlaws, subtitled Picturization of Early Days in Oklahoma, is a 1915 American silent Western film produced by the Eagle Film Company. It depicts the end of the outlaw gangs which operated freely during the closing days of the Twin Territories (Indian Territory and Oklahoma Territory). The movie was directed by Bill Tilghman, noted Western lawman, and filmed by Benny Kent, a pioneer movie photographer and Tilghman's neighbor in Lincoln County, Oklahoma.

== Production ==
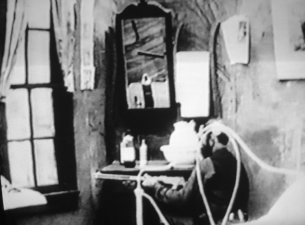
Arkansas Tom Jones plays himself during the battle at Ingalls.

Tilghman organized the Eagle Film Company in response to several movies which glamorized outlaws and depicted lawmen as fools. He intended to produce a movie that gave a realistic portrayal of outlaws and lawmen. The Passing of the Oklahoma Outlaws, while consisting of many actual events, contains several fictional people and scenes. One of the more famous fictional characters shown is Rose Dunn, the Rose of the Cimarron.

Tilghman filmed on location at many of the old outlaw hideouts in Lincoln and Payne counties and in the old Creek and Osage reserves. He recruited local people, as well as cowboys from the 101 Ranch, to act in the film. He played himself, and also enlisted Deputy U.S. Marshals Bud Ledbetter and Chris Madsen to take part in the film. Arkansas Tom Jones (Roy Daugherty), the only survivor of the Doolin–Dalton Gang, also played himself.

== Reception ==
Like many American films of the time, The Passing of the Oklahoma Outlaws was subject to city and state film censorship boards. The Chicago Board of Censors refused to issue a permit allowing the showing of the film because it featured the exploits of a band of train robbers and outlaws.

Tilghman toured with the film, since he found as many people came to see him and his collection as came to see the film. Most of the film is available from the National Archives, although some of it is damaged and a couple of reels are missing.

== Companion book ==
- Graves, Richard S. Oklahoma Outlaws: A Graphic History of the Early Days in Oklahoma; the Bandits Who Terrorized the First Settlers and the Marshals Who Fought Them to Extinction; Covering a Period of Twenty-Five Years. Oklahoma City: State Printing & Publishing Company, 1915.
