= Nottely River =

Stream in North Carolina, USA

Nottely River Tributary to Hiwassee River
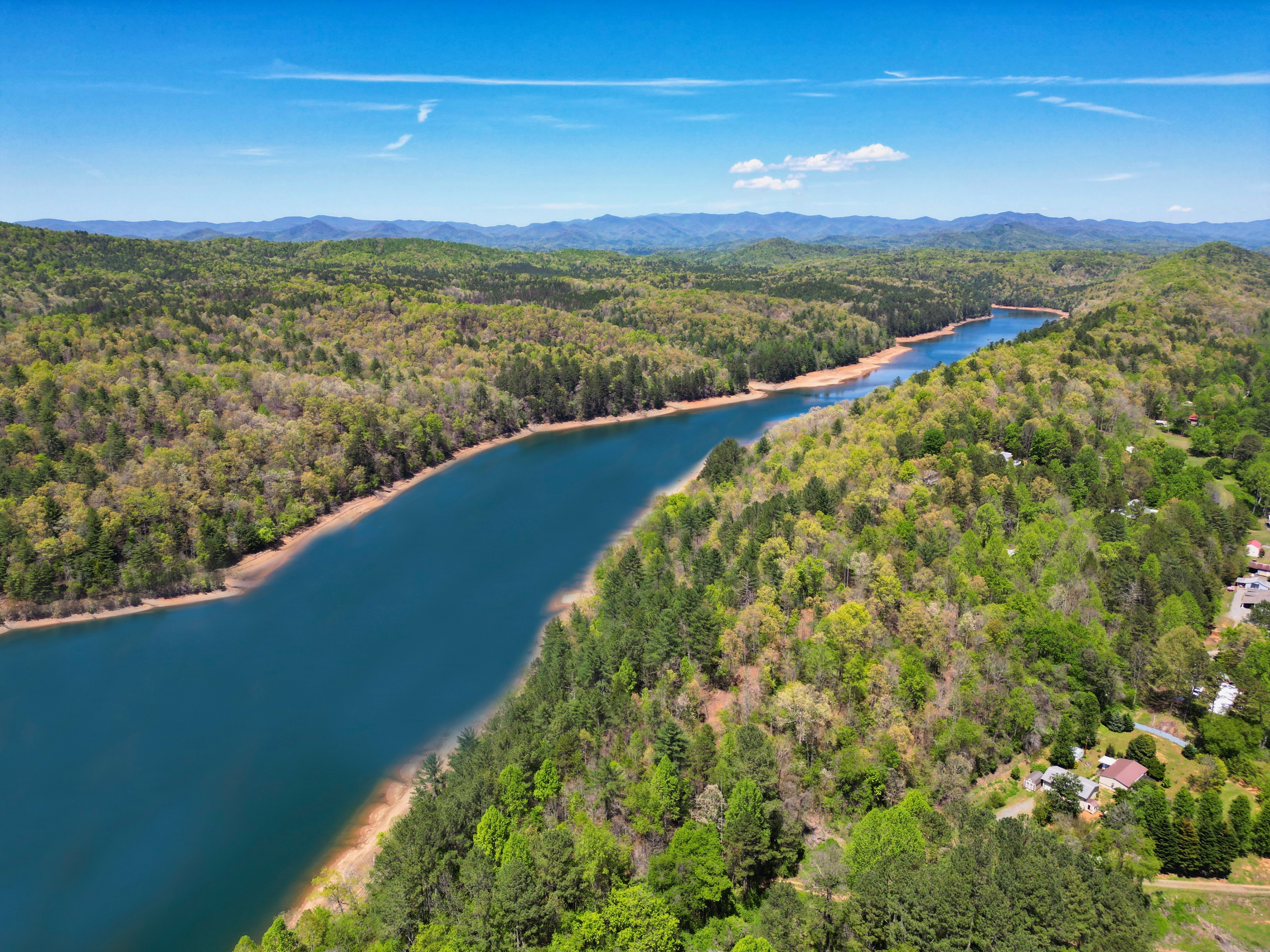
- The river in Cherokee County, NC

- Location of Nottely River mouth Nottely River (the United States)

Location
- Country: United States
- State: North Carolina; Georgia
- County: Union (GA); Cherokee (NC)

Physical characteristics
- Source: confluence of Right Fork and Left Fork
  - location: about 1.5 miles northeast of Double Top Mountain
  - coordinates: 34°44′59″N 083°50′47″W
  - elevation: 2,398 ft (731 m)
- Mouth: Hiawassee River
  - location: Hiawassee Lake
  - coordinates: 35°05′23″N 084°04′35″W
  - elevation: 1,525 ft (465 m)
- Length: 49.12 mi (79.05 km)
- Basin size: 287.93 square miles (745.7 km^{2})
- Discharge
  - location: Hiwassee River (Hiawassee Lake)
  - average: 699.33 cu ft/s (19.803 m^{3}/s) at mouth with Hiawassee River

Basin features
- Progression: Hiawassee River → Tennessee River → Ohio River → Mississippi River → Gulf of Mexico
- River system: Hiawassee River
- Tributaries
  - left: Helton Creek, Chestnut Cove, Spiva Branch, Allison Branch, Wolf Creek, Fortenberry Creek, Morgan Branch, Anderson Creek, Kiutuestia Creek, Brackett Creek, Wash Branch, Youngcane Creek, Jack Creek, Camp Creek, Poteete Creek, Dooley Creek, Butler Creek, Owenby Creek, Rapier Mill Creek, Dickey Branch, Walker Mill Creek, Laurel Branch
  - right: Left Fork, Noah Branch, Polly Branch, Big Branch, Stink Creek, Town Creek, Arkaqua Creek, Atkins Creek, Lawrence Branch, Fields Branch, Laurel Branch, Bony Branch, Butternut Creek, Wellburn Creek, Stephens Branch, Casteel Branch, Ivylog Creek, Chastain Branch, Conley Creek, Thomas Branch, Moccasin Creek, Cobb Creek, Rominger Creek, Cane Creek, Sneed Branch
- Waterbodies: Nottely Lake, Hiawassee Lake
- Bridges: Old Bald Mountain Road, NC 180, Litton Lane, US 120 (Gainesville Highway), Spiva Bridge Way, Jimmy Nicholson Road, Hutson Road, Lower Owltown Road, Wiles Bridge Road, Blue Ridge Highway, US 76-NC 515, Pat Cowell Road, NC 325, Tate Road, Cook Bridge Road, Raper Road, NC 60, US 64

The Nottely River is a river in the United States. The river originates in the Blue Ridge Mountains in northern Georgia. The river flows for 51.1 miles (82.2 km) into the artificial Hiwassee Reservoir in North Carolina. The Nottely River is dammed in Georgia, creating Lake Nottely. Arkaqua Creek is a tributary.

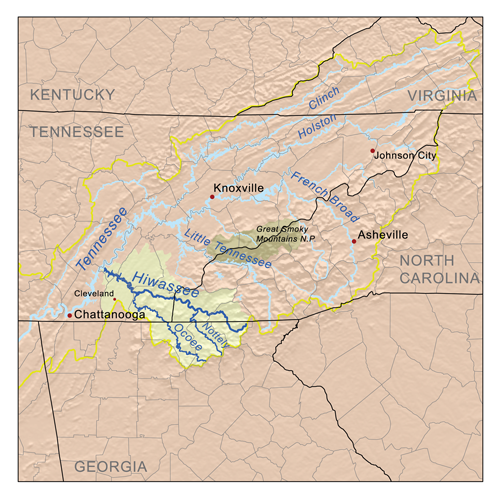
The Hiwassee drainage basin, which includes the Nottely River, located within the upper Tennessee drainage basin

== Variant names ==
According to the Geographic Names Information System, it has also been known historically as:

- Notley River
