= Goingsnake massacre =

Courtroom shootout in the Cherokee Nation os Oklahoma (1872)

Goingsnake Massacre
- Date: April 15, 1872
- Location: Goingsnake District (now Adair County, Oklahoma)
- Outcome: 11 killed 11 wounded

The Goingsnake Massacre refers to the eleven victims of a fatal shootout on April 15, 1872, that broke out during a murder and assault trial in the Cherokee court in the Goingsnake District of the Cherokee Nation (now within Adair County, Oklahoma.) The dead included three Cherokee on the defendant's side, including his attorney and a brother; a US Deputy Marshal and four members of his federal posse, plus three relatives of the Cherokee murder victim. Another ten men were wounded, including both Cherokee and white men.

Ezekial "Zeke" Proctor (Cherokee) was being tried for fatally shooting Polly Beck (Cherokee) and wounding her husband Jim Kesterson, who was white. The trial was highly charged for both personal and political reasons. First, there were strong family ties between the accused and victims. Secondly, the Cherokee and the United States had a jurisdictional dispute over prosecution of the shooting of Kesterton, because he was a white man. The United States District Court for the Western District of Arkansas had limited jurisdiction in Indian Territory. Because Kesterson was white, the US District Court said it had jurisdiction to prosecute Proctor for his attack on the non-Native, although the incident occurred within the Cherokee Nation. It had jurisdiction over non-Native federal crimes in Indian Territory, and all federal crimes in western Arkansas.

The US District Court had assigned two Deputy US Marshals to lead an eight-man federal posse to attend the trial. Five Beck clan members accompanied them. The posse members included two regulars and six newly appointed white men from Fort Smith. If Proctor was acquitted by the Cherokee court, the US Deputy Marshals were ordered to arrest him on federal charges in the attack on Kesterton and bring him back to Fort Smith for trial.

But, shooting broke out in the crowded courtroom during the proceedings: one of the US Deputy Marshals and seven men associated with him (including three Beck clan); and three Cherokee citizens were killed in the méleé, including the defendant's attorney and the defendant's brother. Another ten men were wounded.

The incident has also been called the Goingsnake Tragedy, the Cherokee Courthouse Shootout and the Proctor-Beck Fight.

== Background ==
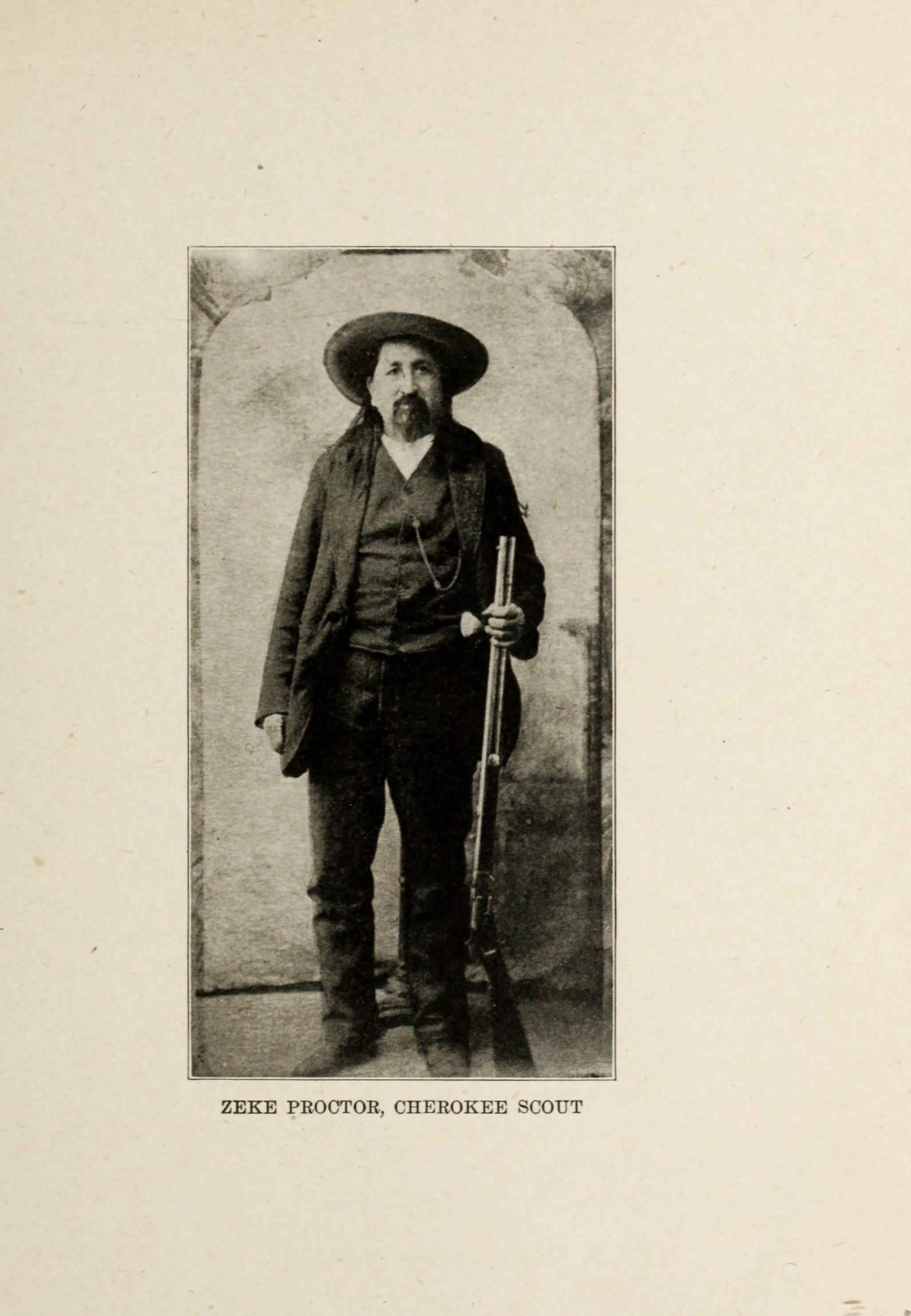
Zeke Proctor

During the American Civil War, Ezekiel "Zeke" Proctor, a Cherokee who had been removed from Georgia, fought for the Union Army. All of the Beck family men, also Cherokee, fought for the Confederate Army. Most of the Cherokee Nation was allied with the Confederacy; many of its members were slaveholders, and the Confederate representatives had promised the Cherokee and other Native Americans an Indian state if they were victorious in the war.

Following the war, tensions between the Proctors and the Becks were high; due mostly to the wartime loyalties. Proctor was a member of the Keetoowah Nighthawk Society, which strongly believed in the preservation of traditional ways, and was trying to resist European-American encroachment on land and culture. These members disapproved of Cherokee women being involved romantically with white men. In 1872 Proctor thought Polly Beck should not be in a relationship with a white man; she had been widowed in an earlier marriage to a Cherokee. Both Proctor and Beck had white fathers themselves, but identified as Cherokee.

He was involved in several saloon brawls in the small town of Cincinnati, Arkansas, but he was also known for taking responsibility and returning afterward to pay for damages.

Polly Beck was described as an attractive woman of mixed race. She was the widow of Steven Hilderbrand (Cherokee), who had been killed during the Civil War. She remarried several times after his death. Jim Kesterson (or Chesterson), who was white, was either her fourth or fifth husband. Polly had one brother and two first cousins who worked with the Deputy US Marshals based at Fort Smith, the site of the US District Court for Western Arkansas and Indian Territory.

== Massacre ==
The United States Marshals and the Cherokee Nation have differing accounts of what contributed to the shootout in the court. Over time, other versions of the initial incident have surfaced, but all tend to indicate two facts:

1. The murder suspect, Zeke Proctor, was known to object to Cherokee women being involved with white men.
2. Jim Kesterson, a white man, had once been married to Proctor's sister, and was now married to Polly Beck

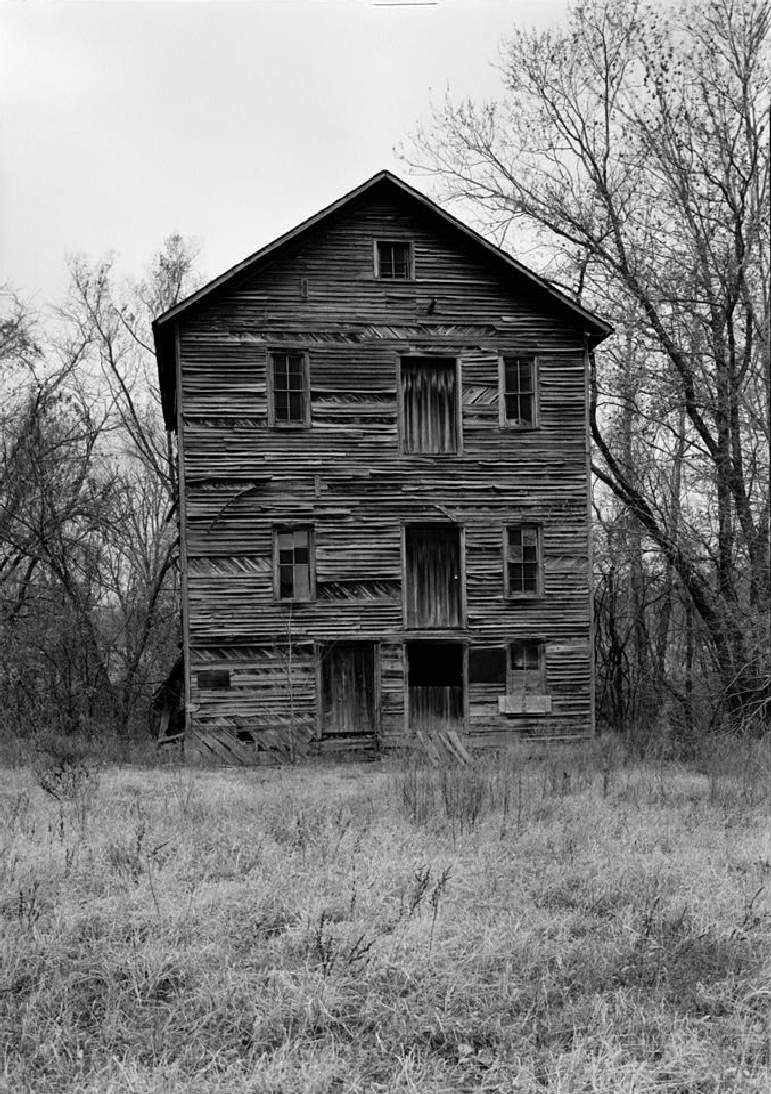
Hilderbrand's (or Beck's) Mill was the site where Proctor killed Beck and wounded Kesterson. It was located in the Flint community of Delaware County. This 1933 photograph shows the structure built around 1900 to replace the original mill where the shootings occurred.

Some versions say that Jim Kesterson had previously been involved with Proctor's sister, Susan, and had left her for Polly. Susan and the children were left destitute (it is said the children were not Kesterson's). Another version says that Kesterson caught Proctor stealing cattle and intended to prosecute. Yet another version claims Proctor had been previously involved romantically with Polly, who was known locally to have dated several men, most of them white. He was said to be in love with her. Another version says that Proctor had never been involved with Polly, but opposed any Cherokee women marrying or being involved with a white man.

Proctor is known to have confronted Polly and Jim on February 27 at her late husband's mill in the Oklahoma Territory. They argued and Proctor shot Kesterson in the head with a rifle, slightly wounding him. Proctor also shot Polly, killing her. Proctor said that he had accidentally killed her.

Stories diverge here, but one version says Proctor surrendered himself after the murder of Polly to the sheriff of the Goingsnake District of the Cherokee Nation. Cherokee judge Blackhawk Sixkiller was appointed to the case.

Chesterson, believing Proctor would not be convicted in a Cherokee court, appealed to the regional federal district court, asking that an arrest warrant be issued to ensure that Proctor received a trial in a non-Cherokee court in Fort Smith, Arkansas.

Treaties with the United States federal government said that Cherokee Nation courts would have jurisdiction over Cherokee people. The prospect of non-tribal law officers being involved in the case was considered a threat to tribal sovereignty and was deeply resented by the Cherokee people. The federal court dispatched a ten-member posse including two Deputy US Marshals to secure the arrest of Proctor at the court house in Tahlequah if he was acquitted by the Cherokee jury. Five members of the Beck clan traveled with this posse.

Because of the strong emotions related to the case, the trial was moved to the schoolhouse, seen as easier to defend than the courthouse. All participants of the trial were heavily armed. Without issuing a warning, members of the group with the Deputy US Marshals attacked the schoolhouse. In the ensuing melee, eight of the posse members were killed or mortally wounded and nine Cherokee, including Proctor and the judge, were wounded, several mortally.

== Casualties ==
=== United States Marshals posse ===
Dead:

- Deputy US Marshal Jacob Owens died of his wounds the following day.
- Posse member William Hicks
- Posse member George Selvidge
- Posse member Jim Ward
- Posse member Riley Woods

At the time, the Beck family were not considered official posse members. Three were killed and one wounded.

- Posse member William Beck died the following day of wounds.
- Posse member Black Sut Beck
- Posse member Sam Beck

Wounded:

- Deputy US Marshal Joseph G. Peevey
- Posse member Paul Jones
- Posse member George McLaughlin
- Posse member White Sut Beck

=== Cherokee ===
Dead:

- Johnson Proctor, brother to defendant Zeke Proctor
- Moses Alberty, Proctor's attorney
- Andrew Palone, Civil War veteran

Wounded:

- Zeke Proctor, defendant
- Judge Blackhawk Sixkiller
- John Proctor
- Isaac Vann (a/k/a Isaac Vinn or Isaac Van)
- Ellis Foreman
- Joe Chaney
- Julius Pinkey Killebrew was thought to have been killed, but had hidden under one of the benches.

== Aftermath ==
The Cherokee authorities moved the trial to a different location. The jury acquitted Proctor. District Attorney James Huckleberry dispatched a large posse from Fort Smith under the command of Deputy US Marshal Charles Robinson. They took with them two doctors, who helped tend to Cherokees wounded in the shootout.

The second posse arrested several men believed to have been involved in the killing of the marshals, including jury foreman Arch Scaper. The Cherokee did not resist the second posse, but Zeke Proctor had fled by the time it arrived.

A federal grand jury in Fort Smith indicted twenty Cherokee who were present at the trial, as well as all the tribal court officers. The Cherokee Nation issued warrants for several Cherokee citizens. The suspects were taken to Fort Smith, Arkansas for trial, but all were eventually released due to lack of evidence or witnesses willing to testify. The federal government later dismissed all indictments.

Zeke Proctor returned to live in the area. By the 1880s he owned a small ranch. He was elected as a Cherokee Senator in 1877, and in 1894 was elected sheriff of the Flint District of the Cherokee Nation. He served as a deputy US marshal from 1891 to 1894, under Judge Isaac C. Parker, who had been in office during the Goingsnake Massacre. Proctor died on February 23, 1907, at age 76. His interment was in West Siloam Springs, Oklahoma's Johnson Cemetery.
