= Arkaqua Creek =

Stream in Georgia, U.S.

Coordinates: 34°50′24″N 83°56′03″W

Location
- Country: United States
- State: Georgia

Physical characteristics
- Mouth: Nottely River

Arkaqua Creek is a stream in the U.S. state of Georgia. It is a tributary to the Nottely River.

Arkaqua Creek was named after a local Cherokee tribesman. Variant spellings are "Arkagua Creek" and "Arkaquia Creek".

== See also ==
- List of rivers of Georgia (U.S. state)
