= Goingsnake =

18th-century Cherokee political leader

- ᎢᎾᏚᎾᎢ
- Born: circa 1758, Cherokee Nation East
- Died: 1 March 1840, Going Snake District, Cherokee Nation (Adair County, Oklahoma)
- Other name: I-na-du-na-i
- Occupation: Cherokee political leader
- Known for: Speaker of National Council, orator

Goingsnake (c. 1758 – March 1, 1840, also spelled Going Snake; Cherokee: ᎢᎾᏚᎾᎢ, romanized: I-na-du-na-i) was a respected warrior, gifted orator, and prominent political leader of the Cherokee Nation. He was born in the vicinity of present-day Nottely Lake (created as a Tennessee Valley Authority (TVA) project in 1942), Georgia, then part of the large Cherokee territory.

When the Cherokee were forced to cede their land and were removed by United States forces from their homeland in the Southeastern United States, Goingsnake, then 80 years old, accompanied them on the Trail of Tears in 1838. He built a new home in Indian Territory, but died soon after the removal. His death date is unknown. The Cherokee Nation celebrated his memory by naming one of its political subdivisions in 1840 as Goingsnake District.

== Life ==
Goingsnake became a prominent Cherokee leader, initially serving as a town chief in what was called "Goingsnake's Town." In 1808 he became the representative in the National Council for the Amohee District (located in present-day Polk County, Tennessee in the southeastern part of the state). Goingsnake was elected in 1827 as Speaker of the National Council, serving under John Ross as Chief. Goingsnake developed the reputation of being one of Ross's "right hand men".

Goingsnake was among the 700 Cherokee warriors who fought with General Andrew Jackson in 1814 against the Creeks in the Battle of Horseshoe Bend.

Under the direction of General Winfield Scott, the army was responsible for the forced removals of the Cherokee known as the Trail of Tears. The initial results were so disastrous that Cherokee leaders, including Goingsnake, successfully petitioned Scott for delays and to allow self-leadership of future detachments. Goingsnake left with the first detachment under Cherokee leadership, which departed on September 28, 1838. Arriving in Indian Territory after a 4-month journey, Goingsnake built his cabin on Ward Branch Creek about 6 miles north of present-day Westville, Oklahoma.

Goingsnake's last recorded political service was participation in the general convention between the eastern and western Cherokee at Tahlequah, Indian Territory on July 12, 1839. He was 81 years old at that time. Shortly thereafter, Goingsnake stepped down and a new speaker was elected.

== Recorded events ==
William Shorey Coodey, a Cherokee who was present at one of the departures on the Trail of Tears, wrote to a friend describing what he saw: "At length the word was given to move on. I glanced along the line and the form of Goingsnake, an aged and respected chief whose head eighty summers had whitened, mounted his favorite pony, passed before me and led the way in silence. At this very moment a low sound of distant thunder fell upon my ears. The sun was unclouded, and no rain fell. I almost thought it a voice of Divine indignation for the wrongs done my poor and unhappy countrymen, driven by brutal power from all they loved and cherished in the lands of their fathers to gratify the cravings of avarice."

In a petition presented to Congress and President Jackson, John Ross expressed the inadequacy of the government agent's arrangements for the July 1835 Cherokee Council meeting at Running Waters (current-day Rome, Georgia). Representatives had to sleep on the ground in close proximity to their hobbled horses. To indicate how poor the conditions were, Ross said that Goingsnake's horse got loose and stepped on his head while he slept. Although his injuries were initially thought to be serious, Goingsnake eventually recovered sufficiently to continue the meeting.

== Death and honors ==
Goingsnake died shortly after his arrival in the Indian Territory. He was buried near his cabin, and the grave site was later marked with a tombstone bearing the inscription: "Chief Goingsnake, Famous Cherokee Orator, Born 1758".

When the western Cherokee Nation established districts in 1840, the Goingsnake District (now part of Adair County, Oklahoma) was named in his honor. A street in Tahlequah, Oklahoma, the capital of the Cherokee Nation, was also named after him.
