= Lake Nottely =

Coordinates: 34°55′40″N 84°04′29″W

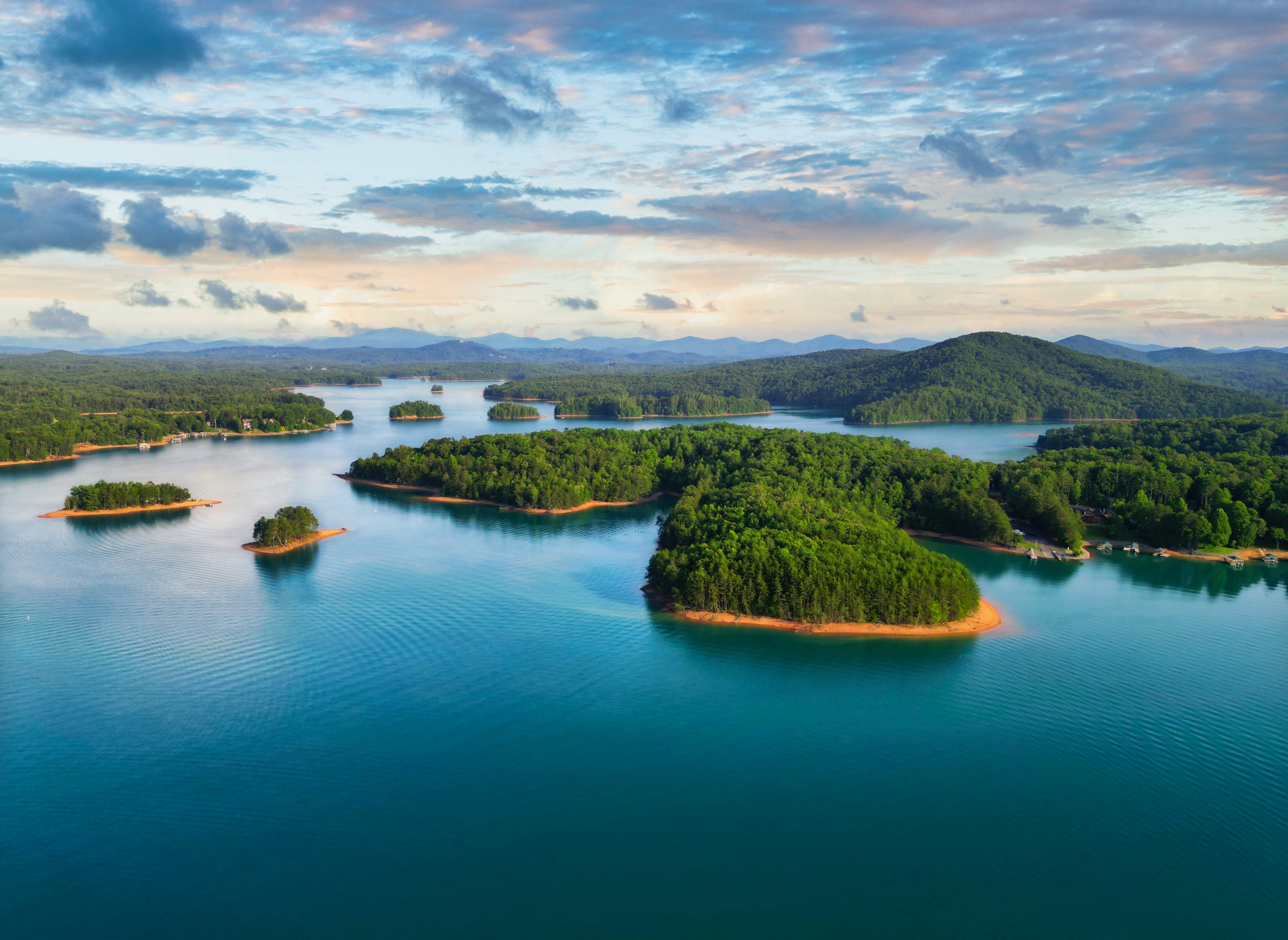

- Location within Georgia Location within the United States
- Location: Union County, Georgia, United States
- Type: Reservoir
- Primary inflows: Nottely River
- Primary outflows: Nottely River
- Basin countries: United States
- Max. length: 20 mi (32 km)
- Max. width: 102 ft (31 m)
- Average depth: 10.6 m (35 ft)
- Max. depth: 30 m (98 ft)
- Surface elevation: 1,779 ft (542 m)

Lake Nottely (also called Nottely Reservoir) is one of many reservoirs of the Tennessee Valley Authority. It is located entirely in Union County, Georgia in the United States and within the Chattahoochee-Oconee National Forests. Formed in 1942 by the damming of the Nottely River, Nottely Reservoir extends 20 miles (30 km) upstream to the town of Blairsville.

Construction of Nottely Dam began in 1941 and was completed in 1942. Ninety-one families were relocated to create the reservoir. The dam is 184 feet (56 m) high and stretches 2,300 feet (701 m) across the Nottely River. Lake Nottely is approximately 20 miles (32 km) long and 102 feet (31 m) wide as well as an average depth of 10.6 metres (35 ft), a max depth of 98 feet (30 m) at the dam, and has a flood-storage capacity of about 61,588 acre-feet (75,968,000 m^{3}). Its primary purpose was for flood control in the Tennessee River watershed, but in the 1950s a single 15 megawatt generator was installed for power generation.

Approximately 70% of the shoreline is under the jurisdiction of the United States Forest Service and undeveloped. In recent years, many new homes and properties have contributed to Lake Nottely's growing importance for recreation. Its proximity to Atlanta (2 hours) is resulting in increased use of this reservoir.

== See also ==
- List of dams and reservoirs of the Tennessee River
