= Nottely Dam =

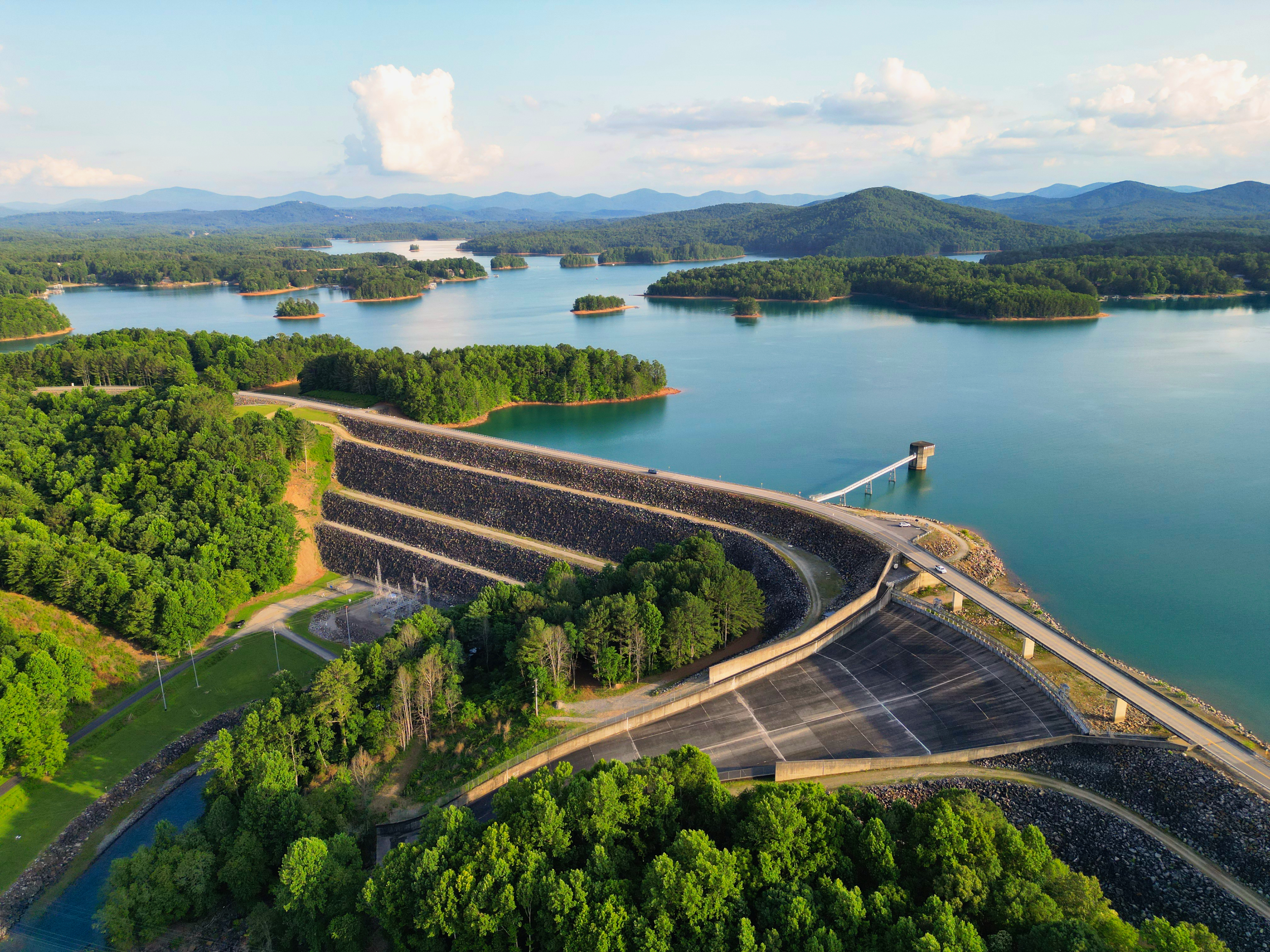
- Nottely Dam
- Interactive map of Nottely Dam
- Official name: Nottely Dam
- Location: Union County, Georgia, United States
- Coordinates: 34°57′31″N 84°5′16″W
- Construction began: July 17, 1941
- Opening date: January 24, 1942
- Operator: Tennessee Valley Authority

Dam and spillways
- Impounds: Nottely River
- Height: 184 feet (56 m)
- Length: 2,300 feet (700 m)

Reservoir
- Creates: Lake Nottely

Nottely Dam is a hydroelectric and flood storage dam on the Nottely River in Union County, in the U.S. state of Georgia. The dam is owned and operated by the Tennessee Valley Authority, which built the dam in the early 1940s as a flood control structure and to help regulate flow at nearby Hiwassee Dam. The dam impounds the Lake Nottely of 4,180 acres (16.9 km^{2}). While the dam was built primarily for flood storage, a generator was installed at Nottely in the 1950s, giving it a small hydroelectric output.

Nottely Dam was named for the Nottely River. The river itself was named after the Cherokee village of Naduhli (ᎾᏚᏟ), which was once situated along its banks. The village name is described variously as coming from the Cherokee for "daring horseman" or from the Muscogee language via Cherokee.

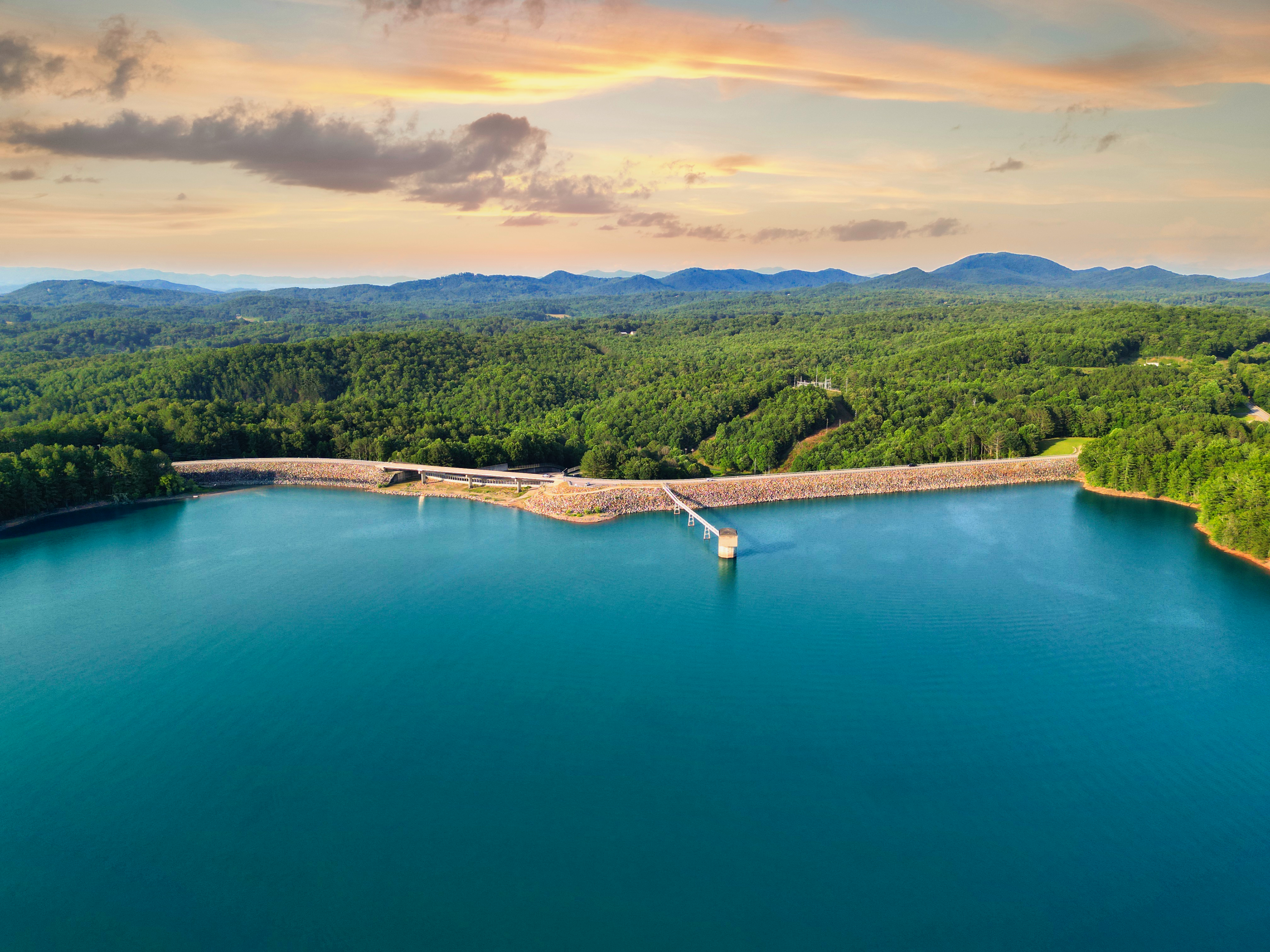
Nottely Dam retains Lake Nottely

== Location ==
The Nottely River, which rises near the Union-Lumpkin county line, flows northward across Union County before crossing into North Carolina en route to its mouth along the Hiwassee River. Nottely Dam is located 21 miles (34 km) upstream from the Nottely's mouth, just south of the Georgia-North Carolina state line. Nottely Lake stretches southward for 20 miles (32 km) along the Nottely to Blairsville, Georgia. Both the dam and reservoir are surrounded by the Chattahoochee National Forest.

== Capacity ==
Nottely Dam is an earth-and-rock dam 184 feet (56 m) high and 2,300 feet (700 m) long. The dam's spillway is a concrete overflow "ski-jump" type situated adjacent to the dam and has a maximum discharge of 11,500 cubic feet per second (330 m^{3}/s). The dam utilizes a concrete intake tower (connected via footbridge to the mainland), where water is diverted into a tunnel and carried downstream. The lone generator at Nottely has a generating capacity of 15,000 kilowatts. Nottely Lake has a flood storage capacity of 61,588 acre-feet (75,968,000 m^{3}), 4,180 acres (16.9 km^{2}) of water surface, and 106 miles (171 km) of shoreline.

== Background and construction ==
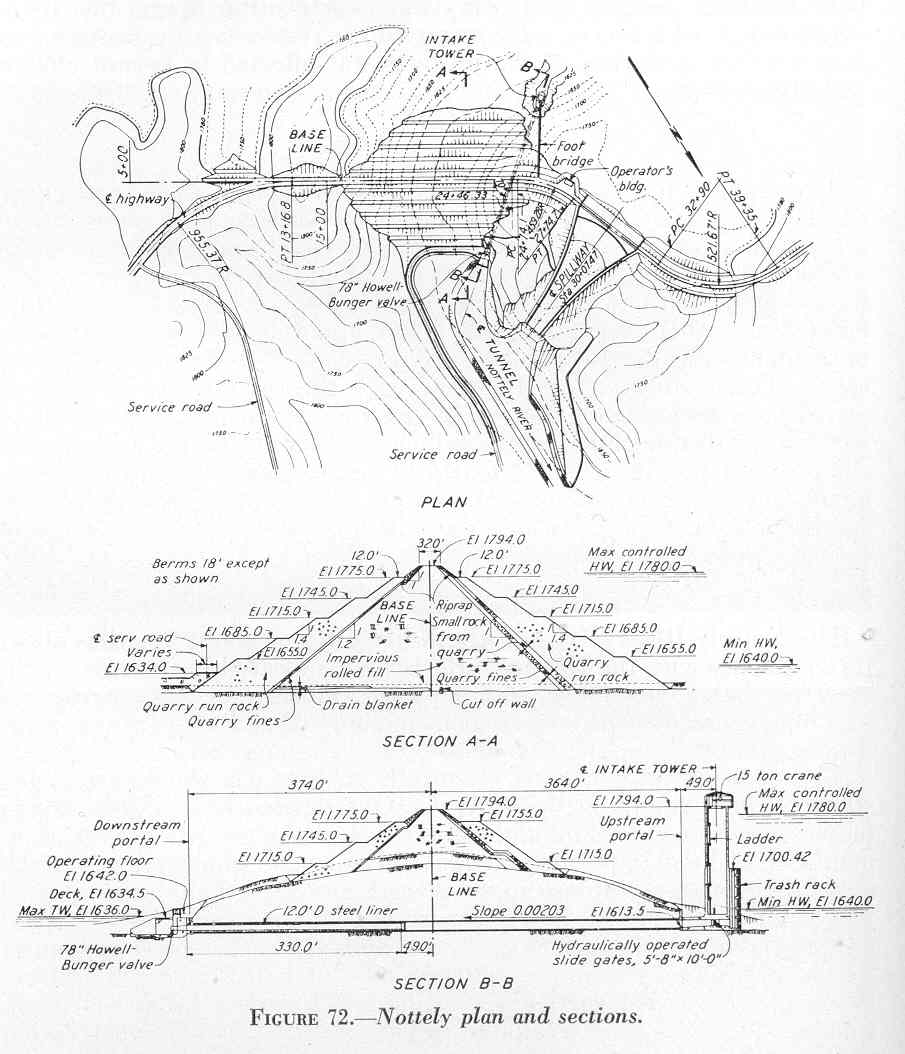
TVA's design plan for Nottely Dam, circa 1941

Before the completion of Nottely Dam, the upper Nottely River was a rugged gorge with several excellent potential sites for a hydroelectric dam. Several private entities—most notably the Southern States Power Company and Union Power Company—had bought up land along the river for future dam projects, but nothing ever materialized. After its creation in 1933, the Tennessee Valley Authority conducted an extensive survey of the Hiwassee watershed—which had been determined to be a major contributor to flooding in Chattanooga—and in 1940 completed Hiwassee Dam (a few miles downstream from the mouth of the Nottely). The outbreak of World War II in Europe in 1941 brought an emergency demand for electricity, which was needed to power aluminum production operations in East Tennessee. Nottely Dam (identified as the "Thompson Canyon site" in early reports), along with several other dam projects in the area, was authorized by the United States Congress on July 16, 1941. Work on the dam began the following day.

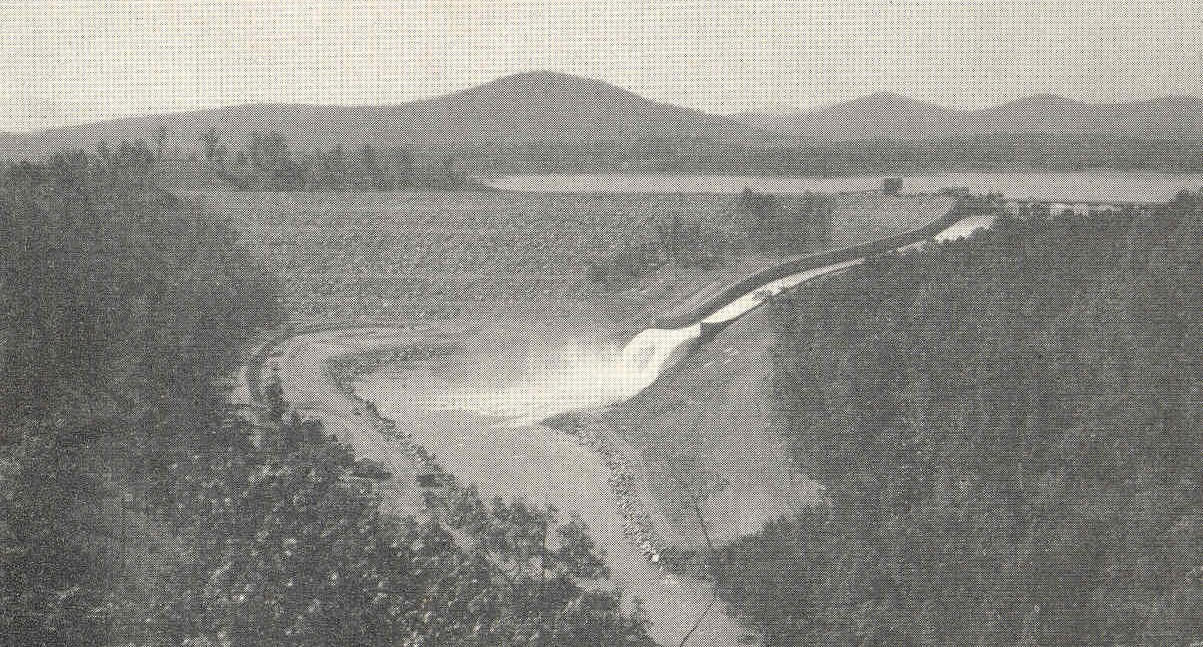
Nottely Dam, shortly after construction in the 1940s

The construction of Nottely Dam required the purchase of 7,984 acres (32.3 km^{2}) of land (most of it from Southern States Power and Union Power), 2,485 acres (10.1 km^{2}) of which had to be cleared. 91 families and 21 miles (34 km) of roads had to be relocated. The dam was initially built solely for flood storage, but was designed so that a generator could easily be added should the need for one arise. The dam was formed by building a rock and stone "crib" and lining the middle with earthen fill. The dam was built as quickly as possible in hopes of allowing its reservoir ample time to fill during the rainy winter months. The speed of its construction was aided by the use of rock-and-fill rather than concrete (the spillway was the only major section that required concrete) and the dam's relatively simple design, which was also employed at nearby Chatuge Dam. Since Nottely's reservoir would fill slowly and create mosquito-breeding environments, various precautions were taken to prevent malaria outbreaks.

Nottely Dam was completed and its gates closed January 24, 1942. The project's final cost was just over $8 million. Throughout its early years, Nottely Dam was operated in conjunction with Hiwassee Dam and Chatuge Dam to allow maximum hydroelectric production at Hiwassee Dam. Nottely was outfitted with its own generator in the 1950s. In 1985, TVA raised Nottely Dam by 15 feet to accommodate higher rainfall.
