= Wauhillau, Oklahoma =

Unincorporated community in Oklahoma, US

Wauhillau, Oklahoma ᎠᏬᎯᎶ (Cherokee)
- Census-designated place
- Location within Adair County and the state of Oklahoma
- Coordinates: 35°51′51″N 94°45′38″W
- Country: United States
- State: Oklahoma
- County: Adair

Area
  - Total: 9.81 sq mi (25.41 km^{2})
  - Land: 9.77 sq mi (25.31 km^{2})
  - Water: 0.039 sq mi (0.10 km^{2})
- Elevation: 896 ft (273 m)

Population (2020)
  - Total: 307
  - Density: 31.4/sq mi (12.13/km^{2})
- Time zone: UTC-6 (Central (CST))
  - Summer (DST): UTC-5 (CDT)
- FIPS code: 40-79150
- GNIS feature ID: 2584395

Wauhillau (Cherokee: ᎠᏬᎯᎶ) is a census-designated place (CDP) in Adair County, Oklahoma, United States. As of the 2020 census, Wauhillau had a population of 307.

== Geography ==
Wauhillau occupies a large rural area in western Adair County. Oklahoma State Highway 51 forms the northeastern edge of the CDP. It is 11 miles (18 km) west of Stilwell, the county seat, and 16 miles (26 km) southeast of Tahlequah in Cherokee County.

According to the United States Census Bureau, the CDP has a total area of 7.93 square miles (20.55 km^{2}), of which 7.90 square miles (20.45 km^{2}) is land and 0.039 square miles (0.10 km^{2}), or 0.48%, is water.

== Demographics ==
Historical population
Census	Pop.	Note	%±
2020	307		—
U.S. Decennial Census

=== 2020 census ===
As of the 2020 census, Wauhillau had a population of 307. The median age was 39.6 years. 26.4% of residents were under the age of 18 and 15.6% of residents were 65 years of age or older. For every 100 females there were 66.8 males, and for every 100 females age 18 and over there were 53.7 males age 18 and over.

0.0% of residents lived in urban areas, while 100.0% lived in rural areas.

There were 110 households in Wauhillau, of which 30.0% had children under the age of 18 living in them. Of all households, 53.6% were married-couple households, 12.7% were households with a male householder and no spouse or partner present, and 26.4% were households with a female householder and no spouse or partner present. About 18.2% of all households were made up of individuals and 9.1% had someone living alone who was 65 years of age or older.

There were 118 housing units, of which 6.8% were vacant. The homeowner vacancy rate was 3.4% and the rental vacancy rate was 4.0%.

Racial composition as of the 2020 census
Race	Number	Percent
White	92	30.0%
Black or African American	2	0.7%
American Indian and Alaska Native	174	56.7%
Asian	0	0.0%
Native Hawaiian and Other Pacific Islander	0	0.0%
Some other race	6	2.0%
Two or more races	33	10.7%
Hispanic or Latino (of any race)	12	3.9%
