= Bud Ledbetter =

American Deputy Marshall in the Indian Territory

- Born: James Franklin Ledbetter; December 15, 1852; Madison County, Arkansas, U.S.
- Died: July 8, 1937 (aged 84); Muskogee, Oklahoma, U.S.
- Occupation: Deputy Marshal

James Franklin "Bud" Ledbetter (December 15, 1852 – July 8, 1937) was an American Deputy Marshall in the Indian Territory.

== Biography ==
Ledbetter was born on December 15, 1852, on his grandfather, George Washington Ledbetter's farm in Aurora, Arkansas, to James Franklin and Sabrina Reeves Ledbetter.

In 1880, Ledbetter became a deputy sheriff of Johnson County and served in the position for fourteen years. In 1895, he was hired by U.S. Marshal Samuel Morton Rutherford to be his deputy.

In 1923, Ledbetter was elected sheriff of Muskogee County, Oklahoma, and remained in the position until retiring in 1928.

He died in Muskogee on July 8, 1937.

== See also ==
- The Passing of the Oklahoma Outlaws
