= List of people from Dodge City, Kansas =

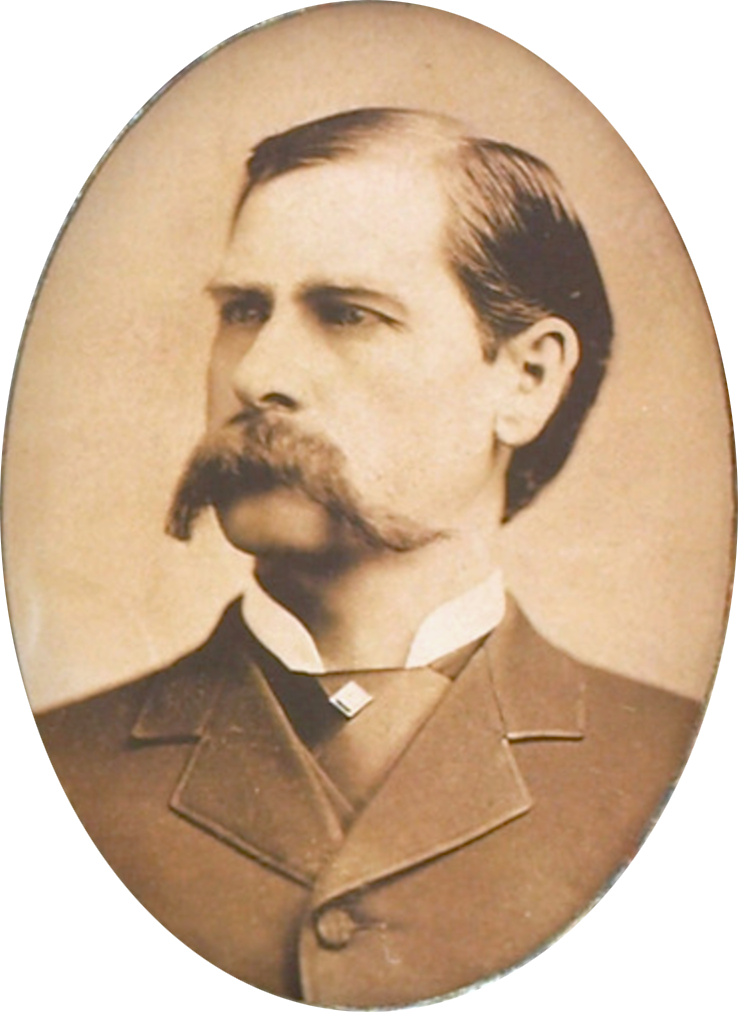
Wyatt Earp lived in Dodge City for only a few years, but is remembered as one of its more colorful residents.

The following is a list of notable individuals who were born in and/or have lived in Dodge City, Kansas.

== Arts and entertainment ==
=== Film, television, and theatre ===
- Madge Blake (1899–1969), actress
- Eddie Foy, Sr. (1856–1928), actor, comedian, dancer
- Dennis Hopper (1936–2010), actor

=== Music ===
- Chris Estes (1971–), bass guitarist
- James King (1925–2005), opera singer

=== Other visual arts ===
- Billy Al Bengston (1934–2022), artist, sculptor

== Crime and law enforcement ==
- Clay Allison (1840–1887), gunfighter
- Charlie Bassett (1847–1896), lawman
- Chalkley Beeson (1848–1912), businessman, lawman
- Big Nose Kate (1850–1940), companion of Doc Holliday
- William L. Brooks (1832–1874), lawman, outlaw
- Shotgun John Collins (1851–1922), gunfighter
- James Earp (1841–1926), lawman, saloon keeper
- Virgil Earp (1843–1905), lawman
- Wyatt Earp (1848–1929), lawman
- Dora Hand (1844–1878), dance hall singer, murder victim
- Doc Holliday (1851–1887), gambler, gunfighter
- James H. "Dog" Kelley (1833–1912), mayor of Dodge City 1877–1881, founder of Kelly Opera House, briefly supervised law-enforcement career of Wyatt Earp
- Frank Loving (1860–1882), gambler, gunfighter
- Bat Masterson (1853–1921), lawman, sports journalist
- Ed Masterson (1852–1878), lawman
- James Masterson (1855–1895), lawman
- Mysterious Dave Mather (1851–1886), gunfighter, lawman
- Levi Richardson (1851–1879), buffalo hunter, gunfighter
- Mary Lou Robinson (1926–2019), United States District Court judge
- Luke Short (1854–1893), gunfighter
- Charlie Siringo (1855–1928), detective, author
- Libby Thompson (1855–1953), dancer, prostitute
- Bill Tilghman (1854–1924), lawman
- Texas Jack Vermillion (1842–1911), gunfighter
- John Joshua Webb (1847–1882), gunfighter, outlaw

== Military ==
- John E. Gingrich (1897–1960), U.S. Navy admiral

== Politics ==
=== National ===
- Charles N. Lamison (1826–1896), U.S. representative from Ohio
- Edmond H. Madison (1865–1911), U.S. representative from Kansas
- Pat Roberts (1936–), U.S. senator from Kansas

=== State ===
- Fred Hall (1916–1970), 33rd governor of Kansas
- Robert Dean Hunter (1928–2023), member of the Texas House of Representatives 1986–2007; first Republican to represent Abilene, Texas, since Reconstruction; vice-president emeritus of Abilene Christian University
- Robert M. Wright (1840–1915), one of the founders of Dodge City; member of the Kansas House of Representatives 1875–1883; one-term mayor of Dodge City

== Religion ==
- David Ricken (1952–), Roman Catholic bishop

== Sports ==
- Robert Delpino (1965–), football player
- Travis Goff (1979–), current athletic director at the University of Kansas
- Sean James (1969–), football player, model
- Nat Love (1854–1921), rodeo cowboy
- Bill Miller (1912–2008), Olympic gold medalist 1932
- Sputnik Monroe (1928–2006), pro wrestler
- Lance Nichols (1939–2024), baseball player, manager

== Fiction ==
- Matt Dillon, fictional U.S. marshal of Dodge City featured on both the radio and television versions of Gunsmoke

== See also ==
- Lists of people from Kansas
