= James H. Kelley =

American mayor of Dodge city, Kansas

James H. "Dog" Kelley
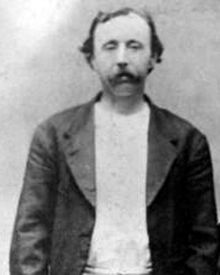
- James H. "Dog" Kelley
- Born: James H. Kelley; February 19, 1834; Manchester, England
- Died: September 8, 1912 (aged 78); Kansas Soldiers' Home, Fort Dodge US
- Resting place: Ford Dodge Cemetery in Ford County
- Occupations: Army Scout, soldier, mayor, businessman and saloon keeper
- Known for: Mayor of Dodge City, Kansas 1877 to 1881; Part owner of Alhambra Saloon; Dodge City War; US Army under George Custer.
- Opponent: James Kennedy

Dora Hand, stage name Fannie Keenan, Kelley's friend and singer, was killed at his home on October 4, 1878

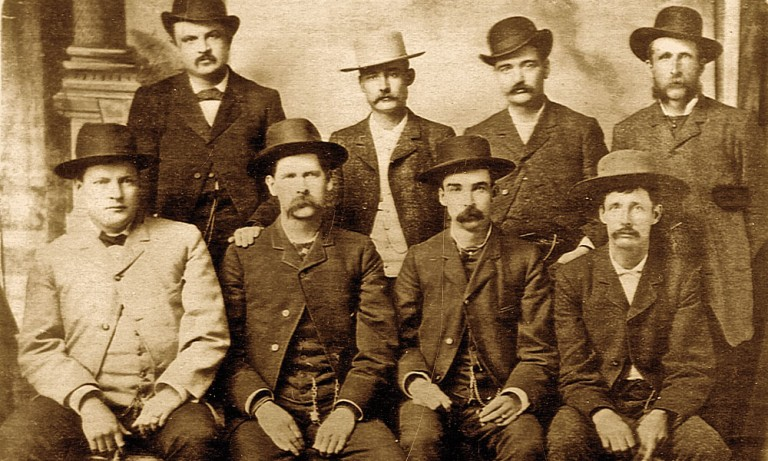
As mayor Kelley worked with the Dodge City Peace Commission (photo)

Dodge City in 1875. Beatty and Kelley Restaurant at the corner of First Avenue and Front Street

James H. "Dog" Kelley (February 19, 1834, Manchester, England – September 1912) was mayor of Dodge City, Kansas from 1877 to 1881. As mayor, Kelley worked with US Marshalls, sheriffs and lawmen in the Old West including Bat Masterson, James Masterson, Ed Masterson, Wyatt Earp and Morgan Earp. Kelley arrived in Dodge City with General George Custer in 1872 and worked as Custer's orderly, caring for his horses and greyhounds. His friend and entertainer, Dora Hand, was killed on October 4, 1878, in his home while he was out of town.

== Biography ==
In the American Civil War Kelley was in the Confederate States Army. After the war, needing a job he joined the Union Army's 7th Cavalry Regiment under George Armstrong Custer. After completing his service, Kelley was given an honorable discharge in 1872. As a parting gift, Custer gave Kelley one of his horses and 12 of his prized hunting greyhound dogs. Custer and his troops were later all killed on June 25, 1876.

Kelley stayed in Dodge City, and because of his pack of dogs, he was given the nickname "Dog". Kelley joined P.L. Beatty and founded the Beatty and Kelley Restaurant. Kelley, a lover of animals, tamed an American black bear and called him Paddy. Kelley kept Paddy behind his restaurant. Kelley became a part-owner of the Dodge City Alhambra Saloon. Kelley stood out in Dodge City, as he rode a white horse and often wore a white corduroy suit.

When Kelley became mayor in 1877, Dodge City was very wild. The city's law enforcement was very weak, as a group of the town's merchants, saloon operators, and gamblers called "the Gang" wanted the business that the cowboys brought to the town. In May 1877 cowboys in town were so out of control and had shot up businesses while drunk that Kelley took action. Kelley sent a telegraph to Wyatt Earp in Deadwood, South Dakota, asking him to come to Dodge City and restore law and order. Wyatt and his brother Morgan Earp became marshals.

Kelley appointed Charlie Bassett as sheriff on December 15, 1877. At Kelley's request, city marshal Larry Deger was removed by the city council. James Masterson and Neil Brown were appointed as marshal and assistant marshal of Dodge City on November 4, 1879, after Bassett and Wyatt Earp stepped down. Wyatt Earp departed Dodge City in 1879. In 1885 a fire destroyed the wooden Beatty and Kelley Restaurant. In its place, Kelley built and opened the Kelley Opera House at the corner of First Avenue and Front Street.

Dora Hand, stage name Fannie Keenan, became a well-known singer at the Alahambra Saloon, singing five nights a week. While Kelley was out of town in a hospital in Fort Dodge, about five miles from Dodge City, he let Hand and her friend Fannie Garretson stay at his home. Cowboy James Kennedy (1855–1884), known as "Spike", had a dispute with Kelley. At 4 am on October 4, 1878, Kennedy fired shots into the Kelley home, thinking the mayor was home sleeping. One shot hit Hand in the side, killing her instantly; she was 34 years old. James Kennedy, was the son of a rich Tascosa, Texas, cattleman, Mifflin Kenedy, owner of the Laureles Ranch. Hand's friends and the town's lawmen, Sheriff Bat Masterson and Assistant US Marshal Wyatt Earp, pursued Kennedy. A posse also took after Kennedy. Masterson caught up with Kennedy the next day and shot him off his horse with his 50-caliber rifle, hitting him in the shoulder. Kennedy was arrested, but did not go to trial for the murder of Hand. Judge R. G. Cook acquitted him, claiming lack of evidence. Rumors are that Mifflin Kenedy may have paid Cook money. Kennedy had been arrested in Dodge City two times before. Wyatt Earp arrested Kennedy for carrying and brandishing a pistol in Dodge City and on August 17, Marshal Charlie Bassett arrested Kennedy for disorderly conduct, but the judge only gave Kennedy a warning. Kennedy became sick in 1884 and died while awaiting trial for murder.

Kelley was a very generous his whole life and well-liked. Never saving up money he lost the Kelley Opera House in a downturn in 1888. He retired and moved back to Fort Dodge, living at the Kansas Soldiers' Home. Kelley became the head of retired widowers housing unit called Angel Barracks.

Kelley came down with tuberculosis and died in September 1912 at the age of 79. He was survived by his daughter Irene; her mother is unknown as there are no records of Kelley being married.

== Television and film depiction ==
Kelley has been played by a number of actors in television shows and films. Paul Brinegar played Kelley in ABC/Desilu western television series The Life and Legend of Wyatt Earp in thirty-three episodes from 1956 to 1958. In Death Valley Days, Stephen Roberts plays Kelley.

== See also ==
- List of mayors of Dodge City, Kansas
