= Arkansas Thomas Cat =

The Arkansas Thomas Cat, "A Journalistic Highball Run by a Heathen," was a humorous weekly magazine founded by Jefferson Davis Orear and published in Hot Springs, Arkansas between 1890 and 1945, when it was suspended for a year and continued as a monthly until about 1950.

The publication contained mostly satire and humorous stories, but also occasionally exposed misdeeds of prominent citizens, especially Arkansas politicians.

Orear was a friend of Bat Masterson.
