= Wyatt Earp's Revenge =

2012 film

- film poster
- Directed by: Michael Feifer
- Written by: Darren Benjamin Shepherd.
- Produced by: Jeff Schenck; Barry Barnholtz
- Starring: Val Kilmer; Diana Degarmo; Kaitlyn Black
- Cinematography: Robert Schein
- Edited by: Sean Olson
- Music by: Andres Boulton
- Production companies: Lancom Entertainment; Sony Pictures Entertainment
- Distributed by: Hybrid Llc; Lancom Entertainment
- Release date: 6 March 2012
- Running time: 93 minutes
- Country: United States
- Language: English

Wyatt Earp's Revenge is a 2012 American Western film about the legendary lawman Wyatt Earp.

It is a fictionalized account of an actual Old West event, the slaying of beautiful singer Dora Hand in Dodge City, Kansas, when Earp was a deputy there. In one of its many instances of dramatic license, the movie depicts Hand as Earp's sweetheart. The film's framing device is a reporter's interview with an aging Earp, who reminisces about the tragedy. (Val Kilmer plays the older Earp, while Shawn Roberts plays the younger one.) The film was released on March 6, 2012, in the United States. The film was produced by Jeff Schenck and Barry Barnholtz and directed by Michael Feifer. The screenplay was written by Darren Benjamin Shepherd.

== Plot ==
Wyatt Earp sits down with a reporter in a suite at the Fairmont Hotel in San Francisco in 1907. The reporter is eager for information about the legendary "Buntline Special", a Colt six-shooter with a 12-inch barrel. He and Earp talk about how Earp became a famous lawman. Earp tells the story of how he became a fearless United States Marshal. In a flashback, a 30-year-old Wyatt Earp (Roberts) finds out that his first love, Dora Hand (DeGarmo), was murdered. He tracks the murderer down and teams up with Bat Masterson (Dallas), Charlie Bassett (Whyte) and Bill Tilghman (Fiehler).

== Cast ==
- Val Kilmer as Wyatt Earp (Kilmer previously portrayed Doc Holliday in the 1993 film Tombstone)
- Shawn Roberts as a young Wyatt Earp
- Matt Dallas as Bat Masterson
- Wilson Bethel as Doc Holliday
- Daniel Booko as James "Spike" Kenedy
- Scott Whyte as Charlie Bassett
- Trace Adkins as Mifflin Kenedy
- Diana DeGarmo as Dora Hand, Earp's first love
- Steven Grayhm as Sam Kenedy
- Levi Fiehler as Bill Tilghman
