= Ed Masterson =

American Old West lawman

Edward Masterson
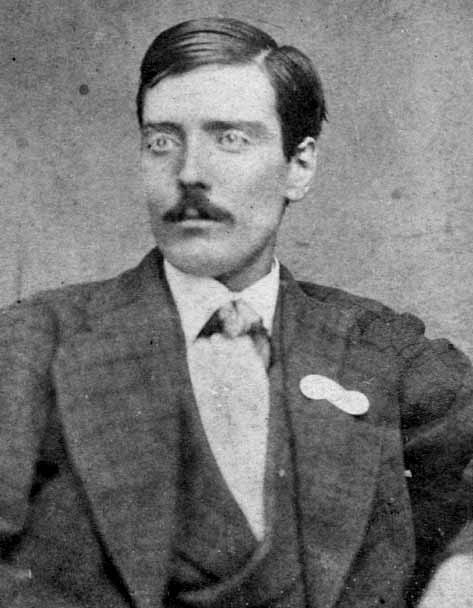
- Born: September 22, 1852; Henryville, Montérégie, Quebec, Canada East
- Died: April 9, 1878 (aged 25); Dodge City, Ford County, Kansas, USA
- Cause of death: Shot to death in the line of duty
- Resting place: Boot Hill in Dodge City; then Fort Dodge, Kansas; possibly removed to a city cemetery thereafter
- Occupations: Buffalo hunter; Lawman (Deputy marshal and U.S. Marshal); Gunfighter; Gambler
- Years active: 1870s
- Parents: Thomas M. Masterson; Catherine U. Masterson née McGurk
- Relatives: Bat Masterson (brother); James Masterson (brother); Nellie E. Cairns (sister); Thomas Masterson II (brother); George H. Masterson (brother); Emma Anna Masterson (sister)

Edward John Masterson (September 22, 1852 – April 9, 1878) was a lawman and the oldest brother of the American West gunfighters Bat Masterson and James Masterson.

== Early life ==
Of Irish descent, Edward John Masterson was born in Henryville in Canada East. In the early 1850s, his family moved to the area about Wichita, Kansas.

== Career ==
Prior to beginning his lawman career, he and his two brothers worked as buffalo hunters. During his service as deputy marshal and then marshal of Dodge City, Kansas, Ed Masterson was shot twice. The first incident occurred in November 1877, when he was shot in the breast by Bob Shaw in the Lone Star Dance Hall. Although his right arm was paralyzed, Ed switched his gun to his left hand and shot Shaw in the arm and leg. After Masterson's recovery, he replaced Larry Deger as the town marshal. It is commonly believed that he replaced lawman Wyatt Earp, but it was actually Deger. On March 15, 1878, Masterson assisted his brother Bat Masterson, who was the Ford County sheriff at that time, and lawman Charlie Bassett in the capture of two train robbery suspects.

== Death ==
Later that same month, Masterson announced publicly that he had a new plan to rid Dodge City of vagrancy and street violence, which included the disarming of gun-carrying men inside the city limits, with immediate implementation. On April 9, 1878, while attempting to disarm a drunken cowboy, Jack Wagner, Ed was shot once in his right side. Bat Masterson, who was nearby, responded, ran across the street, and shot at both Wagner, and his boss Alf Walker, who was holding a gun. Ed Masterson died approximately an hour later, after walking across the street and collapsing. Wagner, hit in the abdomen, died in agony the next day at a nearby room. Walker, hit in the lung and twice in the arm, was thought likely to die but was taken back to Texas and subsequently recovered to take the trail to Kansas again. Witnesses who saw the killing of Ed Masterson report that it appeared he was carrying a rather pungent cigar in his hand. Actually it was the close range muzzle blast from Wagner's gun which had set Ed Masterson's clothes smoldering.

There has been some debate as to whether Bat Masterson or Ed shot Wagner and Walker. Local papers reported that Ed, after being shot, staggered across the Santa Fe tracks to the north side and into Hoover's Saloon. All the "Texan" bars were on the south side of the tracks and this is the area that Ed Masterson patrolled, while the more "respectable" establishments were on the north side of town. Bat was the elected Ford County sheriff and thus did not have direct jurisdiction in town. The incident occurred approximately 10:30 at night and the local newspapers were ambiguous, perhaps trying to shield Bat from Texan vengeance, although Dodge City residents of the time generally suspected that Bat had been responsible. In later years, the newspaper reports led some historians to conclude that Ed had shot his own attackers, and two or three reminiscences have come to light that suggest that Ed might have shot Wagner at least. However, far more of the published accounts by those who were in Dodge City at the time were clear that Bat shot both Wagner and Walker. This is supported by accounts by another Masterson brother, Tom, and Alf Walker's family always believed that Bat had shot him. The recent discovery of two court cases in which Bat testified that he had shot both men when it was hardly in his interests to do so means that it is now generally accepted that Bat avenged his brother.

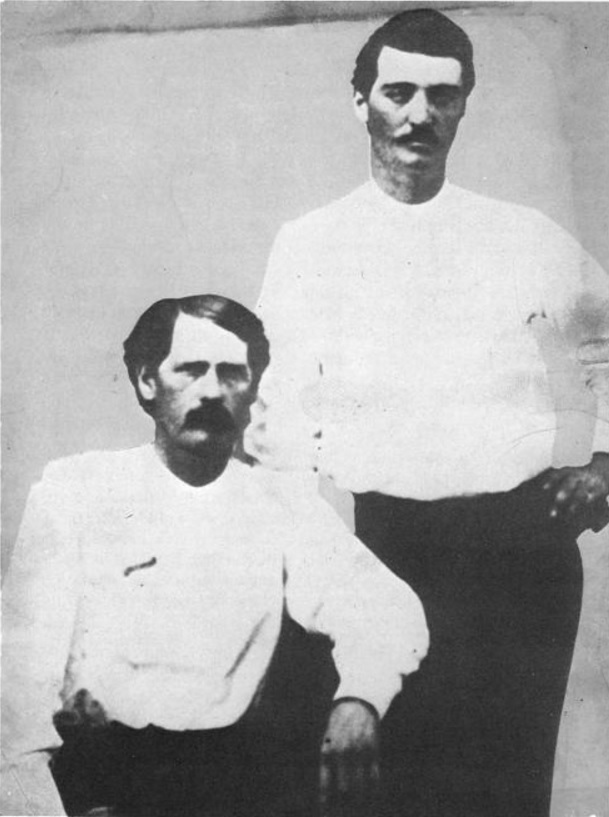
Deputies Bat Masterson (standing) and Wyatt Earp in Dodge City, 1876. The scroll on Earp's chest is a cloth pin-on badge

Charlie Bassett was named by Mayor James H. "Dog" Kelley to replace Ed Masterson as marshal, with Wyatt Earp, James Earp, and Ed's brother, Jim Masterson, working as deputies. His brother Jim would later replace Bassett as marshal. Despite common belief, Wyatt Earp never served as the marshal of Dodge City but as the deputy marshal.

== Lost grave ==
Ed Masterson was initially buried at cemetery at Fort Dodge five miles to the southeast of Dodge City in Ford County. In later years all but military graves were moved to a new city cemetery called Prairie Grove north of Dodge City, then eventually to Maple Grove west of Dodge City. It is believed that Ed's grave was moved from Fort Dodge to Prairie Grove, but was lost when the city closed Prairie Grove and relocated the cemetery to the new Maple Grove west of Dodge City. His current location is unknown.

== Western depictions ==
On April 2, 1957, the western actor Brad Johnson played Ed Masterson in the episode "The Nice Ones Always Die First" of the ABC television series, The Life and Legend of Wyatt Earp, a Desilu Production starring Hugh O'Brian in the title role. Mason Alan Dinehart is cast as Ed's brother, Bat, who took the view that his brother was unsuited to be a lawman.

In the 1959 MGM film, The Gunfight at Dodge City, Harry Lauter portrayed Ed Masterson, historically portraying him as killed, shot in the back by a man avenging his own cousin's death.

In the 1994 Warner Bros. film, Wyatt Earp, Bill Pullman portrayed Ed Masterson, whom Wyatt Earp (played by Kevin Costner) claimed lacked the temperament to be a lawman.

== See also ==
- List of Old West lawmen

Police appointments
Preceded by Lawrence Deger	City Marshal of Dodge City, Kansas; December 6, 1877–April 9, 1878	Succeeded by Charlie Bassett
