= The Woman of the Town =

1943 film by George Archainbaud

- Theatrical release poster
- Directed by: George Archainbaud
- Screenplay by: Aeneas MacKenzie
- Story by: Norman Houston
- Produced by: Harry Sherman
- Starring: Claire Trevor; Albert Dekker; Barry Sullivan; Henry Hull; Porter Hall; Percy Kilbride; Clem Bevans
- Cinematography: Russell Harlan
- Edited by: Carroll Lewis
- Music by: Miklós Rózsa
- Production company: Harry Sherman Productions
- Distributed by: United Artists
- Release date: December 31, 1943
- Running time: 90 minutes
- Country: United States
- Language: English

The Woman of the Town is a 1943 American Western film directed by George Archainbaud and written by Aeneas MacKenzie. The film stars Claire Trevor, Albert Dekker, Barry Sullivan, Henry Hull, Porter Hall, Percy Kilbride and Clem Bevans.

The film was loosely based on the true stories of Dora Hand and Bat Masterson. It was released on December 31, 1943, by United Artists.

== Plot ==
In 1919, Bat Masterson, now a newspaperman in New York City, reflects back on the previous century and his experiences in the American West.

Traveling to Dodge City, Kansas to look up Inky, an old friend, Bat becomes actively involved after the town's sheriff gets shot. He takes over as lawman, his major concern the ruthless rancher King Kennedy's band of rowdy cowboys.

Dora Hand's singing of a hymn in church leads to Bat becoming infatuated with her. He and the Rev. Small are surprised to discover that Dora works in the saloon, which is owned by "Dog" Kelley, who is also Dodge City's mayor. The reverend finds this inappropriate, but Bat writes a newspaper article condemning prejudice of any kind.

Dora has a good heart. She takes care of a sick child, impressing others in town. She also wants Bat to give up his dangerous life, so she asks her uncle in Kansas City to hire Bat for his newspaper there. The uncle is appalled by Dora's line of work and consents with one stipulation, that she never set foot in Kansas City again.

Back in Dodge, she declines Bat's marriage proposal, knowing she can't join him at the new job. She begins seeing King socially instead. But when a fight breaks out, King's errant gunshots hit Dora by mistake. After her funeral, Bat buries his guns and leaves town.

== Cast ==
- Claire Trevor as Dora Hand
- Albert Dekker as Bat Masterson
- Barry Sullivan as King Kennedy
- Henry Hull as Inky Wilkinson
- Porter Hall as Mayor Dog Kelley
- Percy Kilbride as Rev. Samuel Small
- Clem Bevans as Buffalo Burns
- Marion Martin as Daisy Davenport
- Beryl Wallace as Louella Parsons
- Arthur Hohl as Robert Wright
- Teddi Sherman as Fanny Garretson
- George Cleveland as Judge Blackburn
- Russell Hicks as Publisher
- Herbert Rawlinson as Doc Sears
- Marlene Mains as Annie Logan
- Dorothy Granger as Belle
- Dewey Robinson as Waddy Kerns
- Wade Crosby as Crockett
- Hal Taliaferro as Wagner
- Glenn Strange as Walker
- Charley Foy as Eddie Foy Sr.
- Claire Whitney as Mrs. Robert Wright
- Russell Simpson as Sime
- Eula Guy as Mrs. Brown
- Frances Morris as Mrs. Logan
- Tom London as Henchman (uncredited)

== Home video ==
As Vestron Video never had the complete rights to this film, alongside Slightly Honorable and Sundown, other companies, including United American Video Corporation (UAV Corp.), and Alpha Video, have been able to release home video versions of The Woman of the Town for the past decades, with the quality of the prints used varying by distributor. Its first video release was issued by Time-Life Video in 1980, however.
