= Shotgun John Collins =

Old West gunfighter (1851–1922)

Abraham G. Graham
- Born: November 22, 1851; Horry County, South Carolina
- Died: December 2, 1922 (aged 71); El Paso, Texas
- Other names: "Shotgun" John Collins, John Graham, George Graham
- Occupations: Gunfighter, outlaw
- Spouse: Tabitha Cox
- Children: Henry C., Hosea Joe, Abraham, August K., Tabitha Belle, and Jessie Jane Collins; later changed name back to Graham
- Parent(s): Hosea A. Graham and Martha A. Graham
- Criminal charges: Cattle rustling, Horse theft

Abraham G. Graham (November 22, 1851 – December 2, 1922), known by the alias "Shotgun" John Collins, was a little-known though well-associated gunfighter and outlaw of the American Old West.

== Life ==
Abraham G. Graham was born on his grandmother's plantation in Horry County, South Carolina on November 22, 1851.

His great-grandfather, Captain Edward Connor, served in the South Carolina militia during the American Revolution, under Brigadier General Francis Marion. His father, Hosea A. Graham, had married his first cousin Martha Ann Graham, and while Abraham was still a child the family moved to Texas in covered wagons in 1859.

He was of Scottish, English and Irish descent.

While living in Limestone County, Texas, teenagers Abe Graham (also known as John Collins) and John Wesley Hardin were partners, both coming from staunchly pro-Confederate families. Hardin writes in his biography that John Collins was once married to one of his cousins (Tabitha Cox, born in Bonham, Fannin County, Texas) and comments that while he was in Austin jail, Hardin met some noted men naming John Collins, Pipes and Herndon of the Bass gang, John Ringo, Mannings Clements and Brown Bowen.

Collins was sought by lawmen for crimes including cattle rustling and fled Texas for Mexico. After that time, Collins moved to Uvalde, Texas and became one of the five so-called "Uvalde Minutemen" alongside Captain J.J.H. Patterson, Henry Patterson, W.B. Nichols, and Tom Leakey. These five fearless Minutemen did what the Texas Rangers could not do.

Collins then migrated into the western part of what was then "Old Socorro County", New Mexico. As reported by the Grant County Herald, John Collins ushered the year 1875 out with a bang, apparently deciding to kill a man named James "Jim" Smith. Collins was arrested by Sheriff Whitehill of Silver City, New Mexico and jailed. He later bailed himself out for $60 and migrated to Lincoln County.

Many small cattlemen ran together during that time. Collins was in and around the area for about five years at the end of the bloody Lincoln County War. There he became associated with William H. Bonney, known as the notorious outlaw "Billy the Kid", in Silver City. The Kid was wanted at the time and moving around often, and for a time Collins accompanied him. Collins fought in and all during the Lincoln County War.

When the war was over both sides were still up in arms. The people who fought in the war were being persecuted and backwashed. Collins moved to the western part of "Old Socorro County". Collins Park in the Elk Mountains of today's Gila National Park was named in tribute to "Shotgun" Collins.

In April 1879, John Collins was in Rynerson's Territory court in Lincoln, New Mexico for rustling cattle and stealing horses. Collins' brother-in-law, Deputy Sheriff John "Jack" Long, was married to Collins' sister, Delila Jane Graham. Long and Delila had three children, Buelah, Hosea "Judge", and John "Riley" Long, the latter of whom was named after John Riley, a partner in the Lincoln County War.

Collins later went to Uvalde and married his fourth wife, young Tabitha Cox, on November 1, 1880, under the name John Collins. They had six living children and one stillborn child. The family used the Collins name and later changed their name back to Graham. Collins' eldest son Henry, at age 27, married his wife Irene as Henry Collins but later changed his name to Henry C. Graham.

John Collins also met Wyatt Earp, then working for Wells Fargo, as well as Pat Garrett. Collins had changed his name from Graham to his great-grandfather's last name when he left Texas, going by John Collins, to avoid trouble with the law on the earlier cattle rustling issue, but sometimes went by John Graham.

Collins also worked, for a time, riding shotgun for Wells Fargo, and during this time his bond with Earp became strong. It was during this period that he became known by the nickname "Shotgun", due to the numerous shootings he was involved in associated with his work.

He later worked as a buffalo hunter, and a U.S. Cavalry Scout during the Army's struggle with Geronimo and the Apache. Collins was closely associated with the famous W-S Ranch. Eventually he came to own four ranches in Socorro County.

In 1903, Collins moved his family to Mexico and changed his name back to Graham. He worked for Greene Gold and Silver in Mexico as a "guard" and owned several ranches there until the Mexican Revolution. In 1910, Collins escorted his family back to Hermosa. At that time, he sent his two little girls by train to live with his younger brother H. in Buffalo, Texas so that they could be safe with family and get an education.

Collins drifted for a time, through El Paso, Texas and later to Dodge City, Kansas. At times he took part in outlaw activities, while at others he served as a member of posses. In 1883, he came to Dodge City with Wyatt Earp to support Luke Short during what became known as the Dodge City War. When the famous photographs depicting Wyatt Earp, Luke Short, Bat Masterson, Charlie Bassett, M.F. McClain, Neal Brown, William H. Harris, and W.F. Petillion were taken, as well as a less-circulated copy that excludes Petillion and includes Bill Tilghman, Collins was present, as well as Johnny Millsap, "Texas Jack" Vermillion, and several others considered part of the "Dodge City Peace Commission". However, they reportedly decided not to be in the photograph.

Collins was with Uncle John at the Wig Wam Saloon in El Paso when John Selman was shot by George Scarborough, and later testified in the Selman murder trial. He was never involved in any well-known gunfights, with most of his notoriety coming from his days riding shotgun for Wells Fargo and his association with the other members of the "Dodge City Peace Commission". He died in a gunfight at the age of 71, in El Paso, during a dispute.

Collins was on census throughout the Old West as John Collins, John Graham and Abraham Graham with wives and children. "Shotgun" Collins was buried in an unmarked grave under his given name Abe Graham in the Catholic Section of El Paso's Concordia Cemetery, the same section in which his old partners John Wesley Hardin and John Selman were buried. Grave Direction: {Gateway West Gate Entrance} Immediate to right by Concordia Wall to Jewish Wall, Section X, Lot 7, and Grave 6.

Collins was also allegedly cousins with Tombstone's "Curly Bill" Brocius, king of the outlaws. The outlaw cousins were sometimes partners, and descendants of Scotland's Graham Montrose.

== Sources ==
- Rynerson's Court Lincoln New Mexico April 1879
- The Life and Death of a Lawman on the Closing Frontier By Robert K. DeArment
- Concordia Cemetery (Catholic Section) El Paso Texas
- Collins Park, Catron County New Mexico tribute to "Shotgun" Collins
- Alias Frank Canton By Robert K. DeArment
- Marriage License John Collins and Tabitha Cox, Uvalde Texas, Nov. 1, 1880
- Whatever Happened to Billy the Kid By Helen Airey
- The Life of John Wesley Hardin By John Wesley Hardin and Robert G. McCubbin
- Bat Masterson: The Man and the Legend, By Robert K. DeArment [page #245]
- The Place Names of New Mexico, By Robert Hixson Julyan, [Page #91]
- Six-Guns and Single-Jacks By Bob Alexander, {Page 94}
- Rasch Collection University of New Mexico by Phillip J. Rasch, "identifies Abraham G. Graham as John Collins"
- "These Also Served," By Susan E. Lee
