= 213th Regiment =

213th Regiment may refer to:

- 213th Air Defense Artillery Regiment, United States
- 213th Pennsylvania Infantry Regiment, Union Army, American Civil War

== See also ==
- 213th Brigade (disambiguation)
