= Grandview Township, Kansas =

Grandview Township
- Township
- Location in Ford County
- Coordinates: 37°49′33″N 099°56′45″W
- Country: United States
- State: Kansas
- County: Ford

Area
  - Total: 87.43 sq mi (226.45 km^{2})
  - Land: 87.26 sq mi (226.01 km^{2})
  - Water: 0.17 sq mi (0.44 km^{2}) 0.19%
- Elevation: 2,516 ft (767 m)

Population (2020)
  - Total: 569
  - Density: 6.52/sq mi (2.52/km^{2})
- GNIS feature ID: 0471631

Grandview Township is a township in Ford County, Kansas, United States. As of the 2020 census, its population was 569.

== Geography ==
Grandview Township covers an area of 87.43 square miles (226.4 km^{2}) and contains no incorporated settlements. According to the USGS, it contains one cemetery, Pleasant Vale.

The streams of Duck Creek, Elm Creek and South Fork Duck Creek run through this township.

== Communities ==
It contains the census-designated place of Fort Dodge.

== Transportation ==
Grandview Township contains one airport or landing strip, Wilroads Gardens Airport.
