= Kansas Soldiers' Home =

Coordinates: 37°43′58″N 99°56′12″W

The Kansas Soldiers' Home (KSH), located at Fort Dodge, Kansas, was established February 7, 1890. It is under the authority of the Kansas Commission of Veterans' Affairs. It has grown since its inception to include a variety of services.

== History ==
Fort Dodge (US Army Post) was located along the Santa Fe Trail. The post began as a military camp in 1864, but was abandoned. In April 1865 it was permanently established to protect the area from Indian raids. Fort Dodge operated until 1882 and was then somewhat maintained by a custodian. The citizens of Dodge City worked to have a soldiers' home established on the old post. In 1889 President Grover Cleveland signed a bill allowing part of the military reservation to be used as a soldiers' home.

The home opened in early 1890, one source claiming on January 1 and another claiming on February 7. Many of the old post buildings were used by the Soldiers' Home. At any rate among the first occupants were American Civil War veterans, both Union and Confederate. Also, veterans of the Indian campaigns and the Mexican War were admitted. Eventually, black veterans also were admitted as residents.

However, at least in the early years, some residents did not fit into the retirement community. An online article says, "Many were dismissed from the Soldiers' Home for quarrelsomeness, drunkenness, and the like. Even croquet had to be adandoned as a form of recreation when the mallets proved to be to [sic] handy a weapon to settled quarrels among the oldsters."

The first Independence Day celebration at the Home, July 4, 1890, was a memorable event. More than 200 Dodge City residents attended a special celebration at the home. Both Confederate and Union residents and veterans were recognized.

Through the years the home served veterans of all subsequent wars. New buildings were constructed to expand services. A cemetery was established to inter residents who died and needed a place to be buried. As of 2010 approximately 400 veterans were buried in the Kansas Soldiers' Home Cemetery. In 2002 a new cemetery was established, the Kansas Veterans' Cemetery at Fort Dodge. As of 2010 166 veterans and dependents were buried there. Long-term nursing care was added in 1998.

== Services offered ==
Today, a variety of services are offered to the residents and in some cases to staff and visitors. In short, these include:

- A library/museum/gift shop
- Long-term nursing care (56 beds) and domiciliary care (33 beds) independent living (56 single and double room houses)
- A fitness room available for use by residents and staff
- Cottages for use by the more self-sustaining residents
- Two cemeteries
- A US Veteran Affairs funded community based outpatient clinic
- Various arts, crafts and gardening activities for residents

== Accreditation ==
The Kansas Soldiers' Home meets the accreditation requirements of several accrediting bodies:

- The Home is fully accredited by the US Veterans Administration as a State Veterans Home.
- The Home long-term care must meet compliance standards issued by the Kansas Department of Aging.
- U.S. News & World Report in early 2010 produced a list of the best nursing homes in the US. The list, named "Best Nursing Homes", provided a favorable rating for the Kansas Soldiers" Home long term unit. It provided a five-star rating, with one star being the worst possible rating and five stars being the best possible rating. It found a total of four health deficiencies for this home. To compare, the average number of deficiencies for homes in Kansas was 12 and the average number of deficiencies nationwide was 10.

== Notable residents ==
- James H. "Dog" Kelley, mayor of Dodge City from 1877 to 1881, spent his last years at the soldiers' home and died there in 1912
