= 213th Pennsylvania Infantry Regiment =

Union Army infantry regiment

213th Pennsylvania Volunteer Infantry
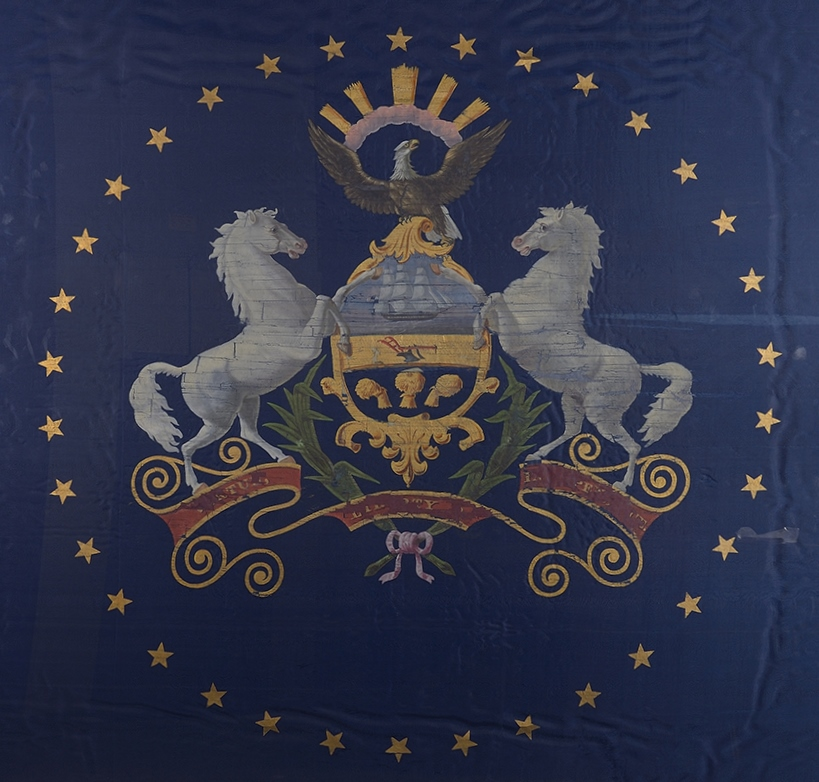
- State Flag of Pennsylvania, circa 1863.
- Active: 2 March–18 November 1865
- Country: United States of America
- Allegiance: Union
- Branch: Union Army
- Role: Infantry
- Size: 1,150 (total enrollment)

The 213th Regiment Pennsylvania Volunteer Infantry, alternately the 7th Union League Regiment was an infantry regiment of the Union Army in the American Civil War. It was raised in Philadelphia close to the end of the war, and spent its nine months of service on guard duty at Camp Parole and Washington, D.C.

== History ==
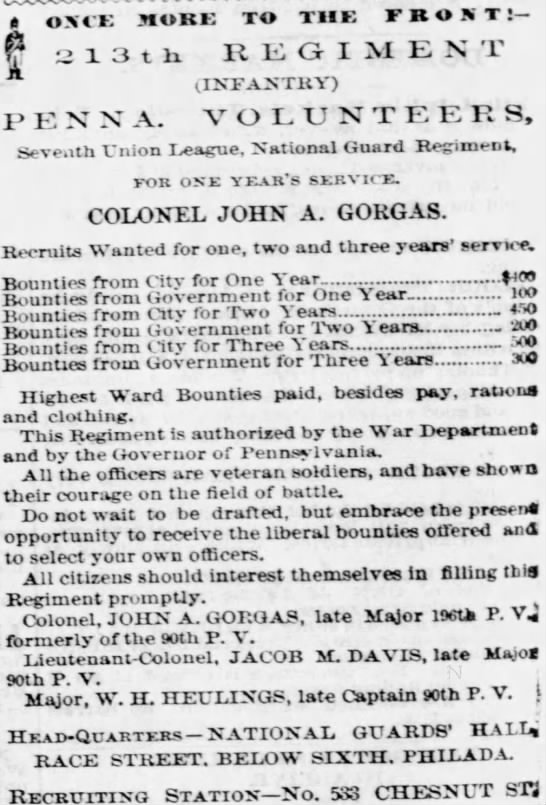
A newspaper recruiting advertisement for the regiment

The 213th Pennsylvania Infantry was organized at Philadelphia between 4 February and 2 March 1865, with men from that city and the counties of Berks, Juniata, and Chester, under the command of volunteer officer Colonel John A. Gorgas. It was raised by the Union League for a one year term of service to replace returning veteran units, and was also known as the 7th Union League Regiment with a total enrollment of 1,150. The regiment was ordered relocated to Annapolis, Maryland, on 4 March to guard Camp Parole as part of the District of Annapolis of VIII Corps, but did not move south until 11 March due to a lack of arms. Three companies under Lieutenant Colonel Jacob M. Davis were sent to Frederick and detailed to guard the line of the Baltimore and Ohio Railroad as part of the First Separate Brigade of VIII Corps. The remaining companies under Gorgas went to Camp Parole where Gorgas became camp commander; Gorgas subsequently took command of the District of Annapolis.

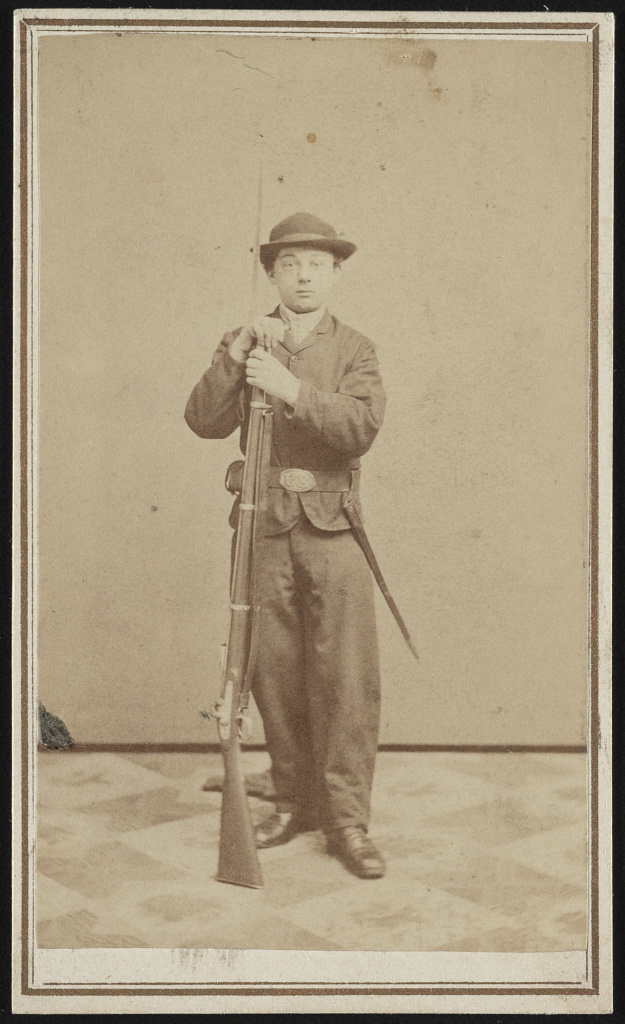
Unidentified young soldier in Union uniform with bayoneted musket, possibly Private Harrison T. Lichtle or Lichtley of Co. D, 213th Pennsylvania Infantry Regiment. From the Liljenquist Family Collection of Civil War Photographs, Prints and Photographs Division, Library of Congress

Major Enos R. Artman of the regiment, commanding the post at Monocacy Junction, sent out a force of men from the 1st Delaware Cavalry that arrested Booth conspirator George Atzerodt on April 20. Artman subsequently received $1,250 out of the $25,000 in reward funds authorized by the U.S. House of Representatives and Secretary of War for the capture of Booth, his co-conspirators, and Jefferson Davis. Sergeant Zachariah W. Gimmell of the 1st Delaware Cavalry, who led the capture of Atzerodt, received $3,598, while the remainder of the reward funds were divided amongst the seven Delaware privates that accompanied Gimmell in the arrest.

The 213th Pennsylvania was concentrated at Washington, D.C. in April, manning the northern defenses of the city after being relieved at Annapolis by a detachment of the 214th Pennsylvania Infantry. The regiment participated in the dismantling of the fortifications at Alexandria and Washington. During its service, eighteen men of the regiment died of disease before it was mustered out on 18 November.

== Notable personnel ==
Future frontier lawman Charlie Bassett served as a private in Company I of the regiment for the duration of its service.

== See also ==
- List of Pennsylvania Civil War regiments
- Pennsylvania in the Civil War
