= Dora Hand =

American singer

- Undated photo
- Born: c. 1844
- Died: October 4, 1878 (aged approximately 34); Dodge City, Kansas, US
- Cause of death: Gunshot
- Resting place: Boot Hill, Dodge City Correction? Per Dee Brown's The American West (p. 284) she is not buried at Boot Hill but at Prairie Grove.
- Occupations: Dance hall singer and actress
- Spouse: Theodore "Ted" Hand (divorced)

Close up of Dora Hand

Dora Hand, her stage name was Fannie Keenan, (c. 1844 – October 4, 1878, aged c. 34), was an American dance hall singer and actress in Dodge City, Kansas, who was mistakenly shot to death from ambush by a young unwanted suitor who was acquitted of criminal charges in the case. Hand was also linked romantically with James H. "Dog" Kelley, the mayor of Dodge City from 1867 to 1871.

== Biography ==
Hand was born in New York City, and raised in Boston. She studied music in Europe and became an opera singer in New York City. After contracting tuberculosis, she traveled west. She married musician Theodore Hand, but divorced in Indiana. She later travelled to Memphis, Tennessee, and in 1876 was in St. Louis, Missouri.

Hand arrived in Dodge City in June 1878 to work for Kelley. Kelley had met Hand earlier at Camp Supply. Kelley joined P. L. Beatty and founded the Beatty and Kelley Restaurant. He became a part-owner of the Dodge City Alhambra Saloon, and later became mayor of Dodge City, in 1877.

The city's law enforcement was very weak, as a group of the town’s merchants, saloon operators, and gamblers called the Gang liked the business that the cowboys brought to the town and did not want law and order to slow business. In May 1877 cowboys in town were so out of control that they shot up the businesses while drunk. Kelley took action, sending a telegraph to lawman Wyatt Earp in Deadwood, South Dakota, asking him to come to Dodge City and restore law and order. Wyatt and his brother Morgan became the marshals and restored order.

In 1885 a fire destroyed the wood-built Beatty and Kelley Restaurant. The fire also destroyed the Alahambra Saloon/Junction Saloon. In its place Kelley built and opened the Kelley Opera House at the corner of First Avenue and Front Street. Hand became one of the well known singers at the Alahambra Saloon/Kelley Opera House, singing five nights a week. Hand was known for her version of the songs "Blessed Be the Ties That Bind" and "Because I Love You So". While Kelley was out of town, in a hospital in Fort Dodge, he let Hand and her friend Fannie Garretson stay at his home. Fort Dodge was a United States Army outpost about five miles from Dodge City.

On October 4, 1878 at 4 am, cowboy James Kenedy (1855–1884), known as "Spike", fired shots into Kelley’s home, thinking the mayor was home sleeping. One of the shots hit Hand in the side and killed her instantly. She was 34 years old. James Kenedy was the son of a rich Tascosa, Texas cattleman, Mifflin Kenedy, owner of the Laureles Ranch. Before the Laureles Ranch, Mifflin Kenedy was in a partnership with Richard King in the King Ranch. Cattlemen took cattle drives on the Chisholm Trail to deliver their product to Dodge City. This is what made Dodge City a boomtown. James Kenedy and Kelley had a dispute that led Kenedy to shoot at his house. Hand’s friends and the town's lawmen, Sheriff Bat Masterson, Assistant US Marshal Wyatt Earp, Charlie Bassett and Bill Tilghman pursued Kenedy. A posse also took after Kenedy. Masterson caught up with Kenedy the next day. Masterson fired a 50-caliber rifle and hit Kenedy in the shoulder, causing him to fall off his horse. Kenedy was arrested, but did not go to trial for the murder of Hand. Judge R. G. Cook acquitted him, claiming lack of evidence. Rumors are that Mifflin Kenedy may have paid Cook money. Kenedy had been arrested in Dodge City two times before. Wyatt Earp arrested Kenedy for carrying and brandishing a pistol in Dodge City and on August 17, Marshal Charlie Bassett arrested Kenedy for disorderly conduct, but the judge gave Kenedy only a warning.

== Television and film depiction ==
Claire Trevor played Hand in the 1943 film The Woman of the Town, which depicts a fictional romance with Bat Masterson.

Phyllis Coates played Hand in the 1964 episode "The Left Hand Is Damned" of the syndicated television anthology series Death Valley Days, hosted by Ronald Reagan. In the story line, Hand nurses the ungrateful gunslinger Slim Kennedy (Peter Haskell) back to health after he is shot in self-defense by Dora's boss, Mayor James H. Kelley (Stephen Roberts) of Dodge City, Kansas. Having lost the use of his right hand, Kennedy vows to kill Kelley and tries to develop skills with his left hand. However, Kennedy mistakenly kills Dora instead. Following this, Kennedy commits "suicide by cop".

English singer-songwriter Frank Turner released a song displaying her story in 2019.

Diana Degarmo played Hand in the 2012 film Wyatt Earp's Revenge which respectively featured Val Kilmer and Shawn Roberts as older and younger versions of the famous lawman.

Actress Margaret Hayes played Hand in three 1956 episodes of the TV series The Life and Legend of Wyatt Earp.

Actress Marlana Dunn played Hand in 2020 in the series The Wild West Chronicles.
