= Dodge City War =

1883 bloodless Wild West conflict

Dodge City Kansas War
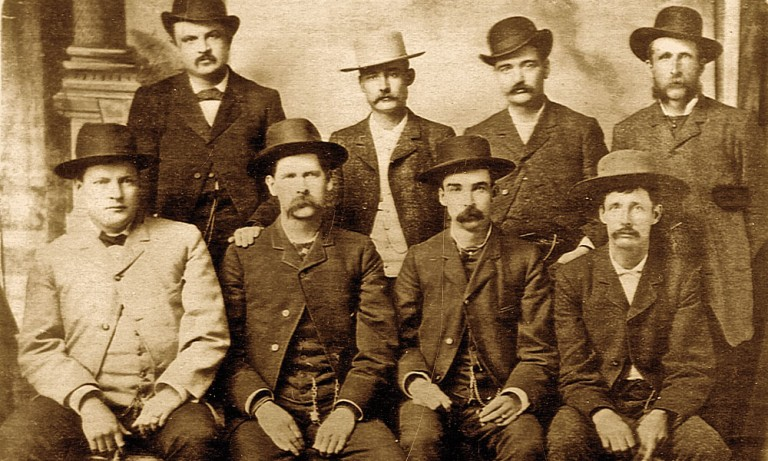
- The "Dodge City Peace Commission" June 10, 1883. (Standing from left) William H. Harris (1845–1895), Luke Short (1854–1893), William "Bat" Masterson (1853–1921), William F. Petillon (1846–1917), (seated from left) Charlie Bassett (1847–1896), Wyatt Earp (1848–1929), Michael Francis "Frank" McLean (1854–1902), Cornelius "Neil" Brown (1844–1926). Photo by Charles A. Conkling.
- Date: June 1883
- Location: Dodge City, Kansas, USA
- Outcome: Long Branch Saloon reopened
- Deaths: None

The Dodge City War was a bloodless conflict that took place between Luke Short and the Dodge City, Kansas Mayor, who tried to force Short to close the Long Branch Saloon and leave town. Luke called on several friends, including Wyatt Earp and Bat Masterson, both former Dodge City, City Marshals who supported him during his confrontation from April 28 to June 7, 1883. The event is best remembered because it produced one of the most iconic photos of Western gamblers, gunfighters and lawmen who played roles in the history of the Wild West.

== Luke Short and the Long Branch Saloon ==
Luke Short arrived in Dodge City, Kansas during April 1881. William H. Harris, whom Short had met in Tombstone, Arizona Territory a few months earlier, gave Luke a job as a faro dealer at the Long Branch Saloon. The saloon was owned by Harris and his partner Chalk Beeson. On February 6, 1883, Chalk Beeson sold his interest in the Long Branch to Short.

The month after Short and Harris formed their partnership, Harris was nominated to run for Dodge City Mayor. On March 19, 1883 a law and order group nominated Lawrence E. Deger to run against Harris. Deger defeated Harris by a vote of 214 to 143 on April 3. The citizens also elected all five of the city council candidates running with Deger.

=== Vice ordinances passed ===
On April 23 the Dodge City, City Council passed two ordinances that were immediately approved by Mayor Deger. "Ordinance No. 70" was for "The Suppression of Vice and Immorality within the City of Dodge City," and "Ordinance No. 71" was titled "Define and Punish Vagrancy." Both of these ordinances were aimed at the Long Branch Saloon.

On April 28, 1883 three prostitutes employed at the Long Branch were arrested by City Marshal Jack Bridges and Policeman Louis C. Hartman. The Ford County Globe reported: “It was claimed by the proprietors that partiality was shown in arresting [the] women in their house when two were allowed to remain in A. B. Webster’s saloon, one at Heinz & Kramer’s, two at Nelson Cary’s, and a whole herd of them at Bond & Nixon’s dance hall.” The paper suggested that if the owners' claim was true, “it would be most natural for them to think so and give expression to their feelings.”

That evening, Short and Hartman got into a gunfight. Neither man was hurt. Short was quickly arrested and released on $2,000 bond. His preliminary hearing was set for May 2. Short told the Globe, "their policeman attempted to assassinate me and I had him arrested for it and had plenty of evidence to have convicted him, but before it came to trial they had organized a vigilance committee and made me leave, so that I could not appear against him."

== Luke Short forced out of Dodge ==
On April 30 Luke Short was again arrested (along with five other gamblers) and placed in jail. The following day Short and the five others were escorted to the train depot and given their choice of east or west-bound trains. Short went east to Kansas City, Missouri where he looked up Charles E. Bassett at the Marble Hall Saloon. Bassett and Luke had a lot in common, not the least of which was that they both, at different times, owned an interest in the Long Branch Saloon. Bassett had served as the first sheriff of Ford County, as well as city marshal of Dodge City. Both Wyatt Earp and Bat Masterson had, at various times, served under Bassett as deputies.

Short and Bassett, along with William F. Petillon, began planning Luke's return to Dodge. Luke went to Topeka on May 10, where he presented a petition to Governor George W. Glick. Upon learning the details of how Luke and five others had been forced out of town using extra-judicial means, told Sheriff George T. Hinkel, this action “simply shows that the mayor is unfit for his place, that he does not do his duty, and instead of occupying the position of peace maker, the man whose duty it is to see that the ordinances are enforced by legal process in the courts, starts out to head a mob to drive people away from their homes and their business.” Glick arranged a 10-day cooling off period to allow Short to return to Dodge and sell the saloon.

The governor's offer was not well-received by some Dodge City citizens. Thirteen men published a statement in the Topeka Daily Capital on May 18, in which they said that if Short overstayed the 10 days, they "would not be responsible for any personal safety."

Short returned to Kansas City where he was joined by Bat Masterson. He had no intention of being forced to sell his saloon and leave Dodge within the 10-day period. Masterson contacted his and Short's friend Wyatt Earp on May 31, 1883. Earp and his wife Josephine went with Masterson, Johnny Millsap, Shotgun John Collins, Texas Jack Vermillion, and Johnny Green to Dodge City to help Short, and the men were sworn in as deputies by constable Dave Marrow. Short, Earp and Petillon met in Kinsley, Kansas on June 3, 1883 and took the afternoon train to Dodge City.

Mayor Deger issued a proclamation the following day ordering the closing of all gambling places in Dodge City.

== Dodge City Peace Commission ==
Mayor Deger's action during the height of the seasonal cattle drive boom would ruin the saloon's and related company's business. Governor Glick and the Santa Fe Railroad, which did considerable business in Dodge, urged the mayor to quickly resolve the conflict. However, Short, Earp, and the others refused to compromise. Seeking to avoid a confrontation with the deputized gunmen, and under pressure from Governor Glick and the Santa Fe Railroad, the mayor and city council backed down. On June 9 they allowed the gambling halls, dance halls, and saloons to reopen, including the Long Branch. Both sides met in a dance hall that night and resolved their differences.

=== Historic photo ===
The following day – June 10, 1883 – eight men gathered and posed for what has become one of the most reproduced Wild West history photos. The group was immediately dubbed the "Dodge City Peace Commission." The eight men in the historic photo were: William H. Harris, Luke Short, Bat Masterson, William F. Petillon, Charles E. Bassett, Wyatt Earp, Michael Francis "Frank" McLean and Cornelius "Neil" Brown. Immediately after the photo was taken, Bat Masterson and Wyatt Earp departed on a west bound train for Colorado. Economics - rather than bloodshed - forced resolution of the "Dodge City War."

=== Luke leaves Dodge City ===
On November 19, 1883 Short and Harris sold the Long Branch to Roy Drake and Frank Warren. Short then moved to San Antonio for a brief time, before deciding to relocate in Fort Worth.
