= Fort Dodge, Kansas =

Unincorporated community in Ford County, Kansas

- Unincorporated community and CDP
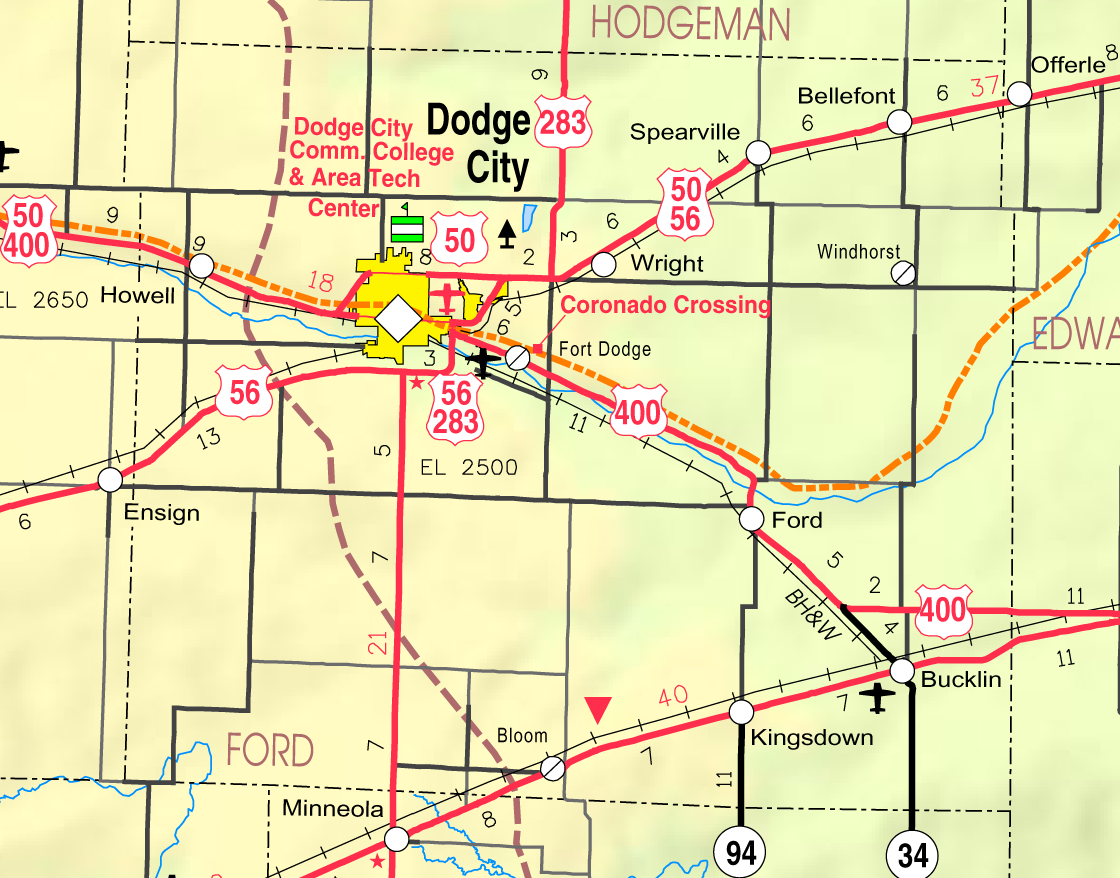
- KDOT map of Ford County (legend)

- Location within Kansas Location within the United States
- Coordinates: 37°43′55″N 99°56′07″W
- Country: United States
- State: Kansas
- County: Ford
- Named for: Fort Dodge (US Army Post)

Area
  - Total: 0.18 sq mi (0.47 km^{2})
  - Land: 0.18 sq mi (0.47 km^{2})
  - Water: 0.0 sq mi (0 km^{2})
- Elevation: 2,464 ft (751 m)

Population (2020)
  - Total: 97
  - Density: 540/sq mi (210/km^{2})
- Time zone: UTC-6 (CST)
  - Summer (DST): UTC-5 (CDT)
- ZIP Code: 67843
- Area code: 620
- FIPS code: 20-23890
- GNIS ID: 473892

Fort Dodge is an unincorporated community and census-designated place (CDP) in Grandview Township of Ford County, Kansas, United States. As of the 2020 census, the population was 97. It is located on U.S. Route 400, 5 miles (8 km) southeast of Dodge City.

== History ==
From 1865 to 1882, Fort Dodge was an outpost on the Santa Fe Trail. After the fort closed, the site became the Kansas Soldiers' Home in 1890.

Fort Dodge has a post office with ZIP Code 67843.

== Demographics ==
Historical population
Census	Pop.	Note	%±
2010	165		—
2020	97		−41.2%
U.S. Decennial Census

=== 2020 census ===
The 2020 United States census counted 97 people, 37 households, and 8 families in Fort Dodge. The population density was 530.1 per square mile (204.7/km^{2}). There were 79 housing units at an average density of 431.7 per square mile (166.7/km^{2}). The racial makeup was 83.51% (81) white or European American (83.51% non-Hispanic white), 1.03% (1) black or African-American, 1.03% (1) Native American or Alaska Native, 1.03% (1) Asian, 1.03% (1) Pacific Islander or Native Hawaiian, 6.19% (6) from other races, and 6.19% (6) from two or more races. Hispanic or Latino of any race was 9.28% (9) of the population.

Of the 37 households, 16.2% had children under the age of 18; 18.9% were married couples living together; 10.8% had a female householder with no spouse or partner present. 73.0% of households consisted of individuals and 45.9% had someone living alone who was 65 years of age or older. The average household size was 1.0 and the average family size was 2.0. The percent of those with a bachelor's degree or higher was estimated to be 27.8% of the population.

2.1% of the population was under the age of 18, 0.0% from 18 to 24, 5.2% from 25 to 44, 17.5% from 45 to 64, and 75.3% who were 65 years of age or older. The median age was 73.5 years. For every 100 females, there were 29.3 males. For every 100 females ages 18 and older, there were 28.4 males.

The 2016–2020 5-year American Community Survey estimates show that the median household income was $33,418 (with a margin of error of +/- $3,662). Males had a median income of $10,729 (+/- $3,979). The median income for those above 16 years old was $10,729 (+/- $3,979).

=== 2010 census ===
As of the 2010 United States census, there were 165 people, 66 households, and 23 families residing in the CDP. The population density was 916.7 inhabitants per square mile (353.9/km^{2}). There were 98 housing units at an average density of 544.4 per square mile (210.2/km^{2}). The racial makeup of the CDP was 95.2% White, 1.8% African American, 0.6% American Indian, 0.6% from other races, and 1.8% from two or more races. Hispanics and Latinos of any race were 3.0% of the population.

There were 66 households, of which 0.0% had children under the age of 18 living with them, 31.8% were married couples living together, 1.5% had a female householder with no husband present, 1.5% had a male householder with no wife present, and 65.2% were non-families. 46.1% of the population was in group quarters. 65.2% of all households were made up of individuals, and 34.8% had someone living alone who was 65 years of age or older. The average household size was 1.35, and the average family size was 2.00.

The median age in the CDP was 76.6 years. 0.0% of residents were under the age of 18; 0.0% were between the ages of 18 and 24; 3.0% were from 25 to 44; 27.9% were from 45 to 64; and 69.1% were 65 years of age or older. The gender makeup of the CDP was 78.2% male and 21.8% female.

The median income for a household was $23,250, and the median income for a family was $32.045. The per capita income for the CDP was $21,004. About 0.0% of families and 0.0% of the population were below the poverty line, including 0.0% of those under age 18 and 0.0% of those age 65 or over.

== Education ==
The community is served by Dodge City USD 443 public school district.

== Notable person ==
- Morris S. Tremaine, businessman and politician. He was New York State Comptroller from 1927 to 1941.
