= Parole camp =

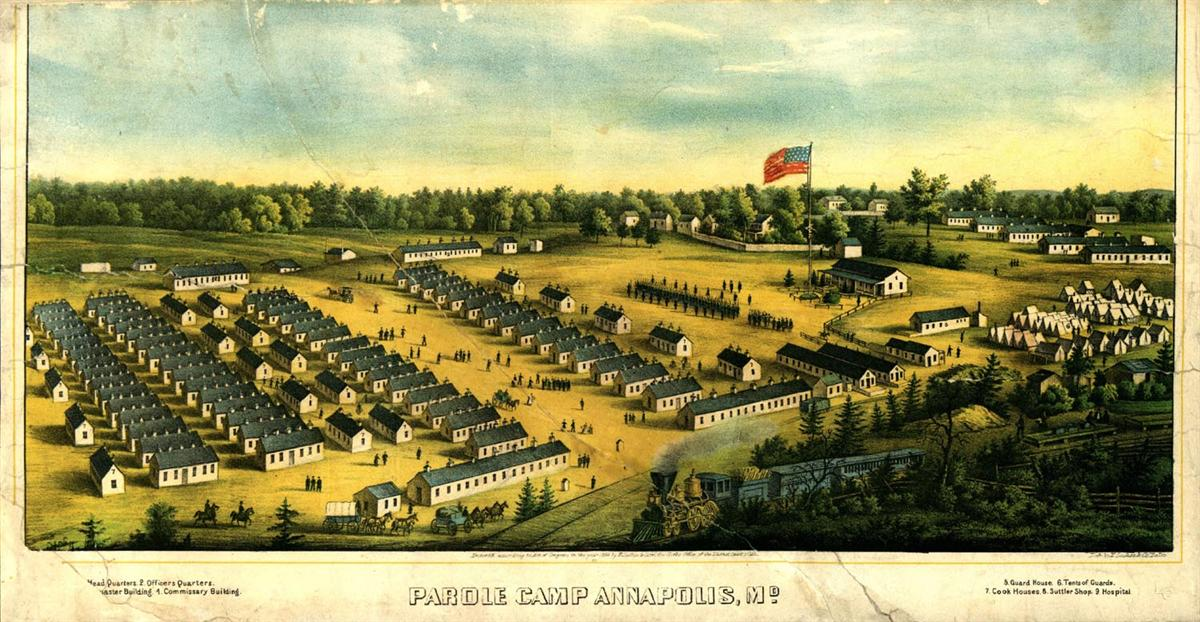
The first Union Army "parole camp" for exchanged Northern prisoners of war, was opened in Annapolis, Maryland in 1862.

During the American Civil War, a parole camp was a place where Union or Confederate soldiers on parole could be kept by their own side, in a non-combat role. They could be restored to a combat role if some prisoners of war were traded to the other side. This would enable them to be returned to a combat role as an exchange for the newly freed prisoners of war. Conditions in the camps were unpleasant; the parolees refused to do guard duty or routine work, claiming that would violate their parole. Many escaped to go home.

== History ==
An honor system was set up where each side would take care of housing its own soldiers who had been designated as being on parole, meaning they would not fight in combat unless they were formally exchanged. The Confederates did not set up parole camps; they let their men go home and expected them to return to duty once officially exchanged. Parole camps were set up by the Union Army for its own soldiers who had been captured by the Confederacy, and then released on the condition that they would honor the terms and conditions of their parole.

In 1862, a parole camp was established in Annapolis, Maryland, on the grounds of St. John's College, But this camp soon ran out of space, so two more were soon built in the local area. One was located in nearby Parole, Maryland, which is how the town got its name. The resulting influx of soldiers changed the nature of the town, since the soldiers were free to visit the local area as much as they might wish. Many soldiers disliked the camp and described it as dirty in their letters home. There were some occasional problems with disorderly conduct by some of the soldiers who were sent there.

There was a short-lived parole camp in West Chester, Pennsylvania, known as Camp Elder. One paroled soldier, Warren H. Freeman, wrote to his father and said that the parolees in the camp were being guarded by inexperienced members of the Pennsylvania militia, all of whom were fairly lenient in their guard duties, presumably because they were guarding members of their own army.

== See also ==
- Dix–Hill Cartel
- Parole
- Prisoner-of-war camp
