= Lawrence Deger =

Lawrence "Larry" Deger (1845–1924) was an American lawman and politician. He served as the first marshall and later mayor of Dodge City, Kansas.

Deger was part of the Dodge City War.

== See also ==
- List of mayors of Dodge City, Kansas
