= Charlie Bassett =

American Old West lawman

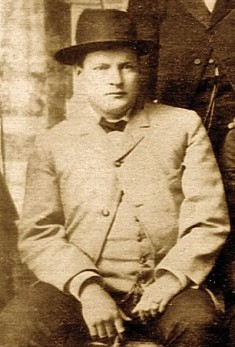
- Charlie Bassett on 10 June 1883
- Born: Charles E. "Charlie" Bassett; October 30, 1847; New Bedford, Massachusetts, US
- Died: January 5, 1896 (aged 48); Hot Springs, Arkansas, US
- Occupations: Lawman and saloon owner
- Known for: One of the founders of the Long Branch Saloon in Dodge City; first sheriff of Ford County, Kansas; Dodge City marshal

Charles E. Bassett (October 30, 1847 – January 5, 1896) was a lawman and saloon owner in the American Old West in Dodge City. He was one of the founders of the Long Branch Saloon in Dodge City, served as the first sheriff of Ford County, Kansas, as well as city marshal of Dodge City. His deputies included Wyatt Earp and Bat Masterson.

== Early years ==
Charles E. Bassett was born on October 30, 1847, in New Bedford, Massachusetts. He was the fourth of six children born to Benjamin and Julia (Norton) Bassett. Charlie was in his late teens when his parents separated, and he elected to live with his father in Philadelphia.

== Civil War record ==
On February 14, 1865, Bassett enlisted in the Union Army at Frankford, Pennsylvania (now a part of Philadelphia). He received a $100 bounty for signing on for one year as a private in Company I of the 213th Pennsylvania Infantry, a volunteer regiment. Bassett was mustered out of his volunteer regiment in Washington, D.C., on November 18, 1865. He served a little more than nine months, not for the year he had signed. This was most likely the result of an Army cutback after Lee's surrender in April.

== Heading West ==
Charles E. Bassett spent the period between late 1865 and early 1873 drifting around the West, serving various stints as a miner, bartender, and buffalo hunter. He was most likely in the neighborhood of what would become Dodge City, Kansas, when his father, Benjamin Bassett died in Philadelphia on January 2, 1872.

== Dodge City and the Long Branch Saloon ==
Charlie Bassett opened the original Long Branch Saloon in Dodge City in late 1872 in partnership with Alfred J. Peacock. Eventually, Bassett and Peacock sold the Long Branch. The saloon changed hands several times until Luke Short became one of the owners. Short's partnership in the Long Branch would cause one of the high points of Bassett's life in 1883.

== Sheriff of Ford County, Kansas ==
On June 5, 1873, the citizens of Ford County, Kansas, chose Bassett as their first sheriff. His headquarters were in Dodge City. Bassett was re-elected twice, serving until 1878. On September 18, 1877, Sam Bass and his gang robbed a Union Pacific train of $60,000 at Big Springs, Nebraska. The bandits were reported in Kansas and Sheriff Bassett went out after them. Bassett's posse included Bat Masterson and John Joshua Webb. The group was unsuccessful in their pursuit of the train robbers. By Kansas law, Bassett could not seek a third successive term as sheriff of Ford County. On November 6, 1877, Bat Masterson was elected sheriff of Ford County, replacing Bassett. One of his first acts was to appoint Bassett as his under-sheriff.

== Assistant Marshal of Dodge City ==
In addition to serving as Bat Masterson's under-sheriff, Bassett was also serving as assistant city marshal under Bat's brother, City Marshal Edward J. Masterson. He was still serving as sheriff when he got the appointment during December, 1877. The Dodge City Times reported, "Sheriff Bassett has been appointed by Mayor [James H.] Kelley to assist Marshal [Edward J.] Masterson in preserving order and decorum in the city. Mr. Bassett has had thorough training and is a good man for the place."

On January 27, 1878, Dave Rudabaugh and four others attempted to hold up a train at Kinsley, Kansas. On February 1, a posse led by Sheriff Bat Masterson captured two of the robbers - Dave Rudabaugh and Edgar West. Charlie Basset assisted his two bosses, Sheriff Bat Masterson and Marshal Ed Masterson, in the capture of two more of the train robbers right in Dodge City.

== Marshal of Dodge City ==
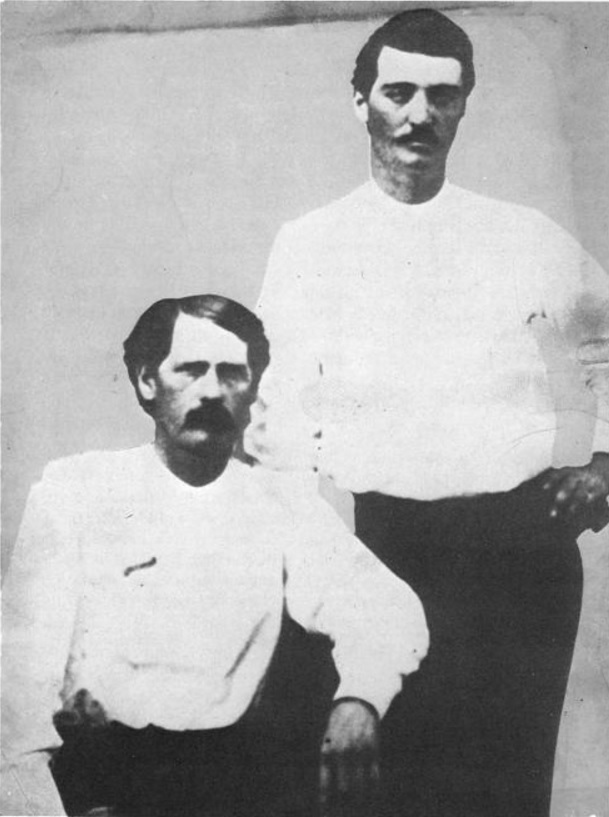
Deputies Bat Masterson (standing) and Wyatt Earp in Dodge City, 1876. The scroll on Earp's chest is a cloth pin-on badge

Dodge City's most colorful and tragic year was 1878. The first tragedy was the murder of Marshal Ed Masterson by two Texans named Jack Wagner and Alfred Walker on April 9. After Ed Masterson's funeral, the Dodge City Council appointed Charlie Bassett as city marshal at a salary of $100 a month. On May 12, Wyatt Earp was appointed as Bassett's assistant marshal at a salary of $75 a month. On July 29, 1878, James "Spike" Kenedy (1855-1884), the son of the wealthy cattle baron Mifflin Kenedy (1818-1895) attempted to shoot Mayor James H. Kelley. He was stopped from doing so by Marshal Bassett. Kenedy paid his fine and court costs and left town. Within three weeks, the young Texan was back in Dodge and in trouble again. According to the court docket for August 17, 1878, Kenedy was again brought into court by Marshal Bassett. This time it was on a charge of being disorderly. After paying his fine, Kenedy was told by Marshal Bassett to get out of Dodge and stay out.

== The Killing of Dora Hand ==
At 4:00 in the morning of October 4, 1878, Kenedy was back in Dodge and fired two shots through the front door of a small frame house usually occupied by Mayor Kelley. One of Kenedy's bullets killed a 34-year-old woman named Dora Hand. The Dodge City Times noted that "the pistol shot was intended for the male occupant of the bed ... who had been absent for several days. The bed however was occupied by the female lodger at the time of the shooting."

A posse left Dodge City at 2:00 on the afternoon of October 4. Its members were Marshal Charles E. Bassett, Assistant Marshal Wyatt Earp, Bill Tilghman, Sheriff Bat Masterson, and Deputy Sheriff William Duffey. At 4:00 on the afternoon of October 5, the posse caught up with Kenedy at a location some 35 miles from Dodge. The possemen turned loose a volley on Kenedy. Three shots slammed into Kenedy's horse, while another shot, supposedly from a .50 caliber Sharp's, shattered Kenedy's left arm. Three weeks after the killing of Dora Hand, Kenedy was released for a supposed lack of incriminating evidence. Spike Kenedy returned to Texas to manage his father's 390,000-acre LaParra Ranch. He died from typhoid fever during December 1884.

== Colorado, New Mexico, and Texas ==
On November 4, 1879, the Dodge City Council appointed James Masterson as city marshal, to replace Charlie Bassett, who had resigned. According to the local paper: "Ex-Sheriff Chas. E. Bassett, accompanied by Mysterious Dave [Mather] and two other prospectors, started out last week in search of 'greener fields and pastures new.' They went in a two-horse wagon, after the style in the days of 49."

After unsuccessfully panning for gold in Colorado, Bassett and Mather drifted successively to New Mexico and Texas. Both men were in San Antonio during the early part of 1881. Mather remained in Texas for the next two years, but Bassett had grown homesick for Dodge City. His return to Dodge was noted by a local paper, which reported, "Charles E. Bassett, ex-sheriff of Ford County, and formerly city marshal of Dodge City - one of the old timers - arrived in the city last Tuesday after an absence of a year and a half. Charley looks as natural as life, wears good clothes, and says Texas is suffering from the dry weather."

== Kansas City ==
Bassett did not remain in Dodge City for long. He moved on to Kansas City, Missouri, where he became manager of Webster and Hughes Marble Hall Saloon. The Kansas City Journal reported his arrival by noting, "Hon. C.E. Bassett, a well known cattle man of Kansas and Texas, returned to this city yesterday, after a brief stay in Dodge City. He will remain here for some time." On April 28, 1883, the celebrated "Dodge City War" broke out. Luke Short had been run out of Dodge and headed straight for Kansas City, where he looked up Charlie Bassett at the Marble Hall Saloon. Bassett quickly proceeded to re-establish Short in Dodge City. Quick to respond were Wyatt Earp and Bat Masterson, along with several others.

== The Dodge City Peace Commission ==
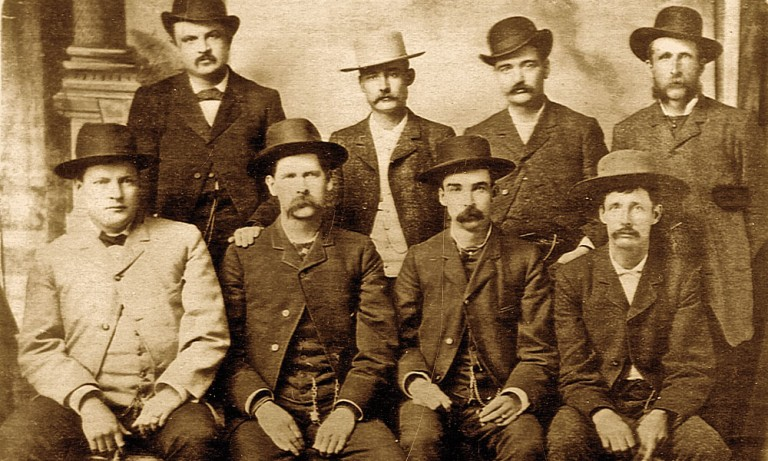
The "Dodge City Peace Commission", June 10, 1883. (L to R) standing: William H. Harris, Luke Short, Bat Masterson, William F. Petillon. Seated: Charlie Bassett, Wyatt Earp, Michael Francis "Frank" McLean, and Cornelius "Neil" Brown.

The bloodless Dodge City War ended with both sides reaching an agreement in early June 1883. To maintain the shaky truce, the Dodge City Peace Commission was formed, including Bassett. Bassett returned to Kansas City, where he opened the Senate Saloon and obtained the nickname "Senator". The venture was a failure and Bassett went to work as a bartender in an establishment he did not own.

== Final years ==
Bassett suffered from inflammatory rheumatism during his final years. He went to Hot Springs, Arkansas, with the hope that the water would benefit his health, but he died there at age 48 on January 5, 1896.

== Bibliography ==
- DeMattos, Jack. "The Dodge Citians: Charles E. Bassett." Nola Quarterly (Vol. XIX, No. 4) October–December 1995.
- Miller, Nyle H. and Snell, Joseph W. Why the West Was Wild, Topeka: Kansas State Historical Society, 1963.
- Shillingberg, Wm. B. Dodge City: The Early Years, 1872-1886. Norman, OK: The Arthur H. Clark Company, 2009.

Police appointments
Preceded by New office	Sheriff of Ford County, Kansas; June 5, 1873–November 8, 1877	Succeeded by Bat Masterson
Preceded by Ed Masterson	City Marshal of Dodge City, Kansas; April 9, 1878–November 4, 1879	Succeeded by James Masterson
