= Bat Masterson =

American army scout, lawman, gambler, and journalist (1853–1921)

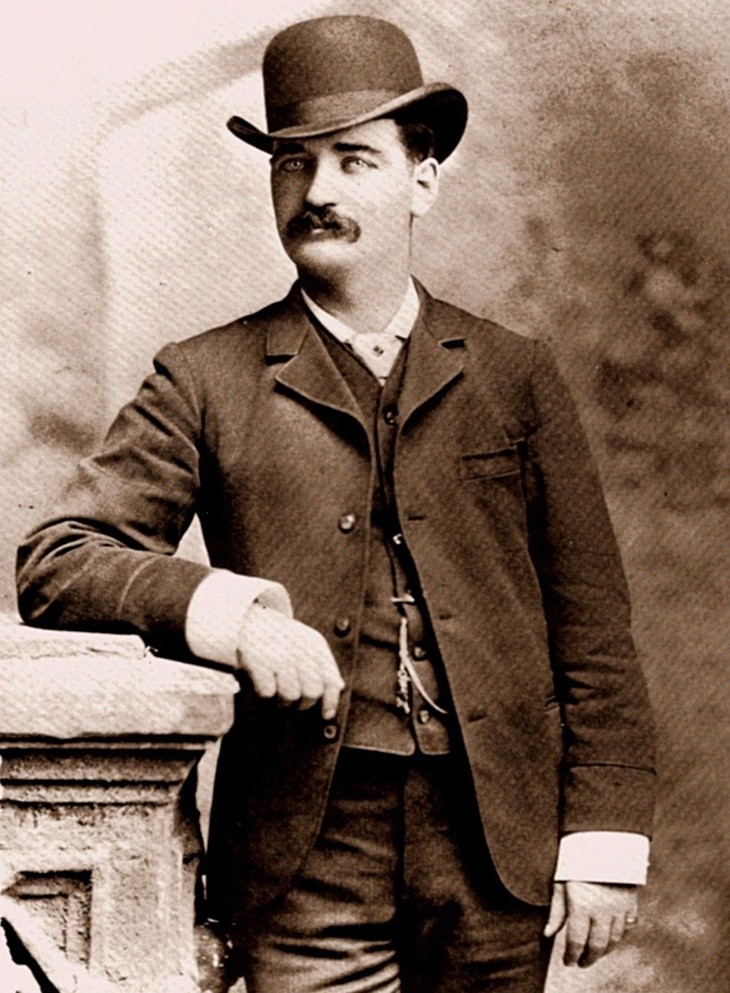
- Masterson in 1879
- Born: Bartholemew William Barclay Masterson; November 26, 1853; Henryville, Quebec, Canada East
- Died: October 25, 1921 (aged 67); New York City, U.S.
- Resting place: Woodlawn Cemetery; 40°53′17″N 73°52′19″W
- Occupations: Buffalo hunter; army scout; lawman; gunfighter; gambler; journalist
- Years active: 1872–1900; 1908–1912
- Parents: Thomas M. Masterson; Catherine U. McGurk Masterson
- Relatives: James Masterson (brother); Ed Masterson (brother)
- Military career
- Allegiance: United States
- Branch: United States Army
- Service years: August–October 1874
- Rank: Scout (civilian)
- Conflicts: Red River War; Second Battle of Adobe Walls

Bartholemew William Barclay "Bat" Masterson (November 26, 1853 – October 25, 1921) was a U.S. Army scout, lawman, professional gambler, and journalist known for his exploits in the late 19th and early 20th-century American Old West. He was born to a working-class Irish family in Quebec, but he moved to the Western frontier as a young man and quickly distinguished himself as a buffalo hunter, civilian scout, and Indian fighter on the Great Plains. He later earned fame as a gunfighter and sheriff in Dodge City, Kansas, during which time he was involved in several notable shootouts.

By the mid-1880s, Masterson had moved to Denver, Colorado, and established himself as a "sporting man" or gambler. He took an interest in prizefighting and became a leading authority on the sport, attending almost every important match and title fight in the United States from the 1880s until his death in 1921. He moved to New York City in 1902 and spent the rest of his life there as a reporter and columnist for The Morning Telegraph. His column covered boxing and other sports, and it frequently gave his opinions on crime, war, politics, and other topics, as well. He became a close friend of President Theodore Roosevelt and was one of the "White House Gunfighters" who received federal appointments from Roosevelt, along with Pat Garrett and Ben Daniels.

By the time of his death in 1921, Masterson was known throughout the country as a leading sports writer and celebrity. He is remembered today for his connection to many of the Wild West's most iconic people, places, and events, and his life and likeness are frequently depicted in American popular culture.

== Early life ==
Masterson was born on November 26, 1853, (Note: Other dates are cited in some Colin sources, but his baptism is recorded in the Quebec Archives in a record dated 27 November 1853, making it clear that he was born the previous day. (See DeArment, Robert K., Bat Masterson, The Man and the Legend, University of Oklahoma Press, 1979, pp. 9–10.)) at Henryville, Quebec, in the Eastern Townships of what was then known as Canada East. He was baptized under the name Bartholomew Masterson. Various schools of thought explain the "Bat" moniker. One likely came from family and friends shortening Bartholomew, "Bart" to "Bat". Since Bat Masterson used a cane, there became a legend that the instrument, being referred to as a bat, gave him the nickname. Masterson was the second child of Thomas Masterson (or Mastersan), who was born in Canada to an Irish family, and Catherine McGurk (or McGureth), who was born in Ireland. (Note: Bat Masterson later claimed on a U.S. census form that he was born in Illinois or Missouri, but that was probably because he had never bothered to become naturalized despite having voted and held public office.) The other six Masterson children were Edward John (1852–1878), James Patrick (1855–1895), Nellie E. (1857–1925), Thomas (1858–1941), George Henry (1860–1889), and Emma Anna "Minnie" (1862–1884). The children were raised on farms in Quebec, New York, Illinois, and Missouri until the family finally settled near Wichita, Kansas.

== Move to the frontier ==
In his late teens, Masterson and his brothers Ed and Jim left their family's farm to hunt buffalo on the Great Plains. In July 1872, Ed and Bat Masterson were hired by a subcontractor named Raymond Ritter to grade a five-mile section of track for the Atchison, Topeka & Santa Fe Railroad. Ritter skipped out without paying the Masterson brothers all of the wages to which they were entitled.

It took Masterson nearly a year, but he finally collected his overdue wages from Ritter, at gunpoint. On April 15, 1873, Masterson learned that Ritter was due to arrive in Dodge City, Kansas, aboard a Santa Fe train and that Ritter was carrying a large roll of cash. When Ritter's train pulled in, Masterson entered the car alone and confronted him and marched him out onto the rear platform of the train, where he forced him to hand over the $300 owed to him, his brother Ed, and a friend named Theodore Raymond. A loud cheer then went up from a large crowd which had witnessed the event.

=== Battle of Adobe Walls ===
Masterson was once again engaged in buffalo hunting on June 27, 1874, when he became an involuntary participant in one of the Wild West's most celebrated Indian fights: a five-day siege by several hundred Comanche, Kiowa and Cheyenne warriors led by Quanah Parker at a collection of ramshackle buildings in the Texas panhandle known as Adobe Walls. Masterson was one of only 28 hunters who defended the outpost during the attack. The Comanche suffered the most losses during the battle, though the actual number killed is not known, with reports ranging from a low of 30 to a high of 70. The defenders of Adobe Walls lost only four men, one of whom shot himself by accident. (Note: William Olds accidentally shot himself in the head as he was descending a ladder. William "Billy" Tyler was killed by the Indians, and two brothers, Isaac and Jacob Scheidler, were sleeping in their wagon when the Indians attacked and killed them.) After being fought to a standstill, Quanah Parker and his followers rode off.

In August 1874, Masterson signed on as a U.S. Army scout with Colonel Nelson Miles, who was leading a force from Fort Dodge to pursue Comanche and Apache war parties across the Cherokee Strip and into Texas. The force was eventually engaged to recover four sisters—ranging in age from 9 to 15—who had been captured by a group of Cheyenne Dog Soldiers. The sisters were part of a family that had been attacked outside of Ellis, Kansas, on September 11, 1874, while migrating to Colorado Territory. Their parents, brother, and two older sisters had been killed and scalped. All four sisters were recovered alive by Miles' force over a period of about six months.

== Gunfighter and lawman ==
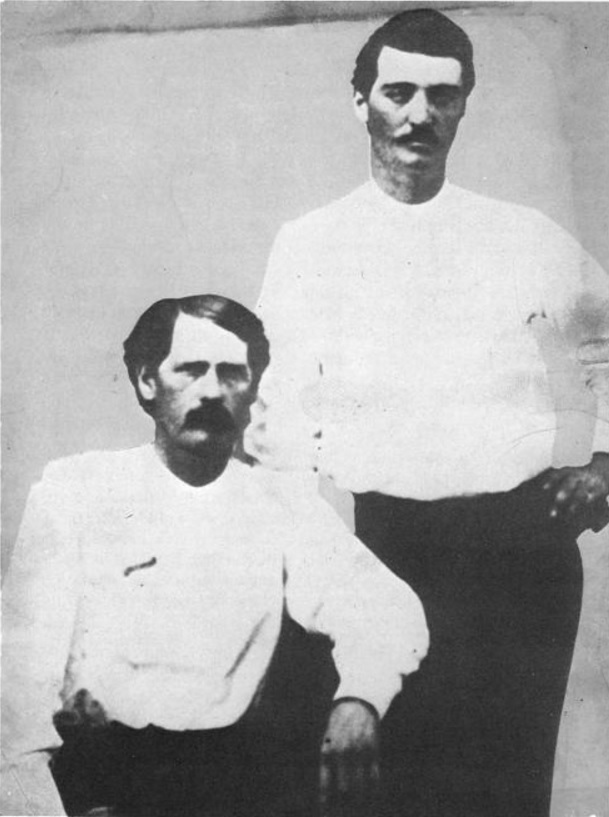
Deputies Bat Masterson (standing) and Wyatt Earp in Dodge City, 1876. The scroll on Earp's chest is a cloth pin-on badge.

Masterson's first gunfight took place on January 24, 1876, in Sweetwater, Texas (later Mobeetie in Wheeler County). He was attacked by a soldier, Corporal Melvin A. King (real name Anthony Cook) allegedly because he was with a woman named Mollie Brennan. Brennan was hit by one of King's bullets, possibly by accident, and was killed. King died of his wounds. Masterson was shot in the pelvis but recovered. This is the reason he used a cane. The cane would become one of his famous trademarks.

=== Dodge City ===
Masterson soon settled in Dodge City. On June 6, 1877, Masterson tried to prevent the arrest of Robert Gilmore, who was known to the locals as "Bobby Gill." Masterson managed to wrap his arms about the girth of the 315 pound city marshal, Lawrence Edward "Larry" Deger, thereby permitting Gill to escape. Masterson was grabbed by friends of Deger and pistol-whipped by the lawman. The following day, Masterson was fined $25 for disturbing the peace. Bobby Gill, the cause of Masterson's fine, was assessed only $5.

During July 1877, Masterson was hired to serve as under-sheriff to Sheriff Charles E. Bassett. Bassett was prohibited by the Kansas State Constitution from seeking a third consecutive term. With the job up for grabs, Masterson decided to run for the office. Masterson's opponent turned out to be Larry Deger. On November 6, 1877, Masterson was elected county sheriff of Ford County, Kansas, by the narrow margin of three votes. (Note: Masterson defeated his opponent, Lawrence Edward "Larry" Deger, by a vote of 166 to 163.) Within a month of Masterson's election, on December 6, 1877, Ed Masterson replaced Larry Deger as city marshal of Dodge, so together the Masterson brothers controlled the city and county police forces.

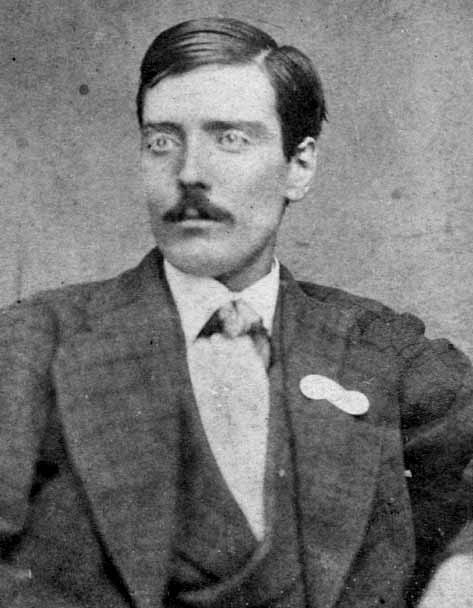
Ed Masterson

On February 1, 1878, Sheriff Masterson captured the notorious outlaws Dave Rudabaugh and Ed West, who were wanted for an attempted train robbery. Two more of the train robbers were caught by Bat and brother Ed on March 15. The tandem law enforcement effort came to an abrupt end, however, when 25-year-old City Marshal Ed Masterson was shot and killed in the line of duty on April 9, 1878. Ed Masterson was mortally wounded by a cowboy named Jack Wagner, who was unaware that Bat Masterson was in the vicinity. As Ed stumbled away from the scene, Bat Masterson responded from across the street, firing on both Wagner and Wagner's boss, Alf Walker—who was holding a gun. Wagner died the next day, but Walker was taken back to Texas and recovered. The local newspapers were ambiguous about who shot Wagner and Walker, and this led some later historians to question whether Bat Masterson was involved. However, the rediscovery of two court cases in which Bat Masterson testified under oath that he had shot both men adds credence to the idea that Bat had avenged his brother.

More violence followed on October 4, 1878, when a variety actress named Dora Hand, known professionally as "Fannie Keenan," was shot and killed by James Kenedy, son of the wealthy Texas cattleman, Mifflin Kenedy. Masterson's posse, which included Wyatt Earp and Bill Tilghman, captured Kenedy the following day after Masterson shot him in the left arm, and other posse members killed his horse.

=== Royal Gorge Railroad War ===
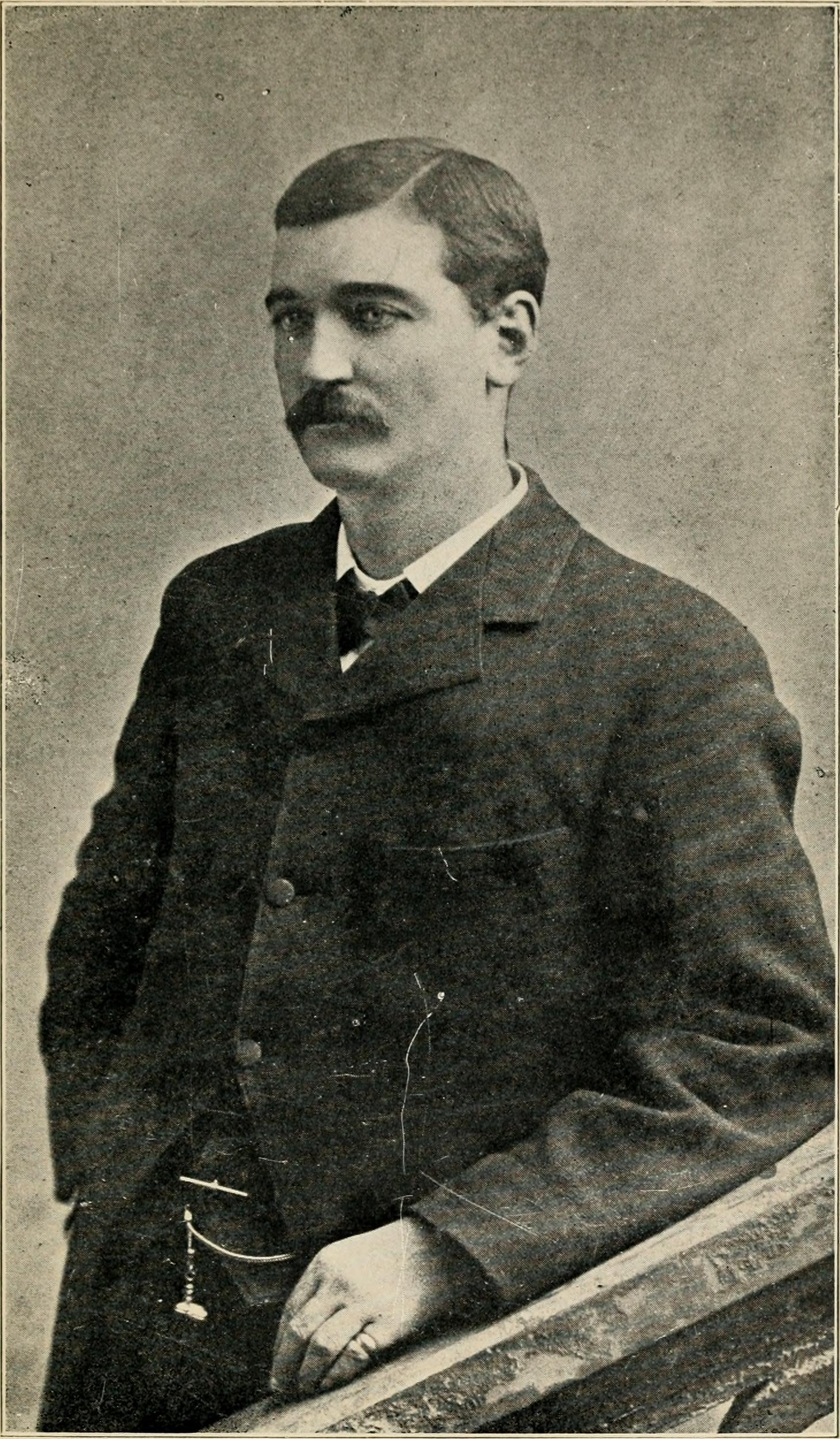
Bat Masterson in 1879

Santa Fe Railroad officials had wired Sheriff Bat Masterson asking him to recruit men to battle the forces of the Denver & Rio Grande Railroad, which were contesting the right-of-way through the Royal Gorge near Canon City, Colorado. As a sheriff in Kansas, Masterson had no authority in Colorado, but this did not prevent him from enlisting a large company of men. Among Masterson's recruits were such noted gunmen as Ben Thompson, "Mysterious Dave" Mather, John Joshua Webb, and possibly Doc Holliday. The end of Masterson's involvement came on June 12, 1879, when he surrendered a roundhouse his men were holding at Pueblo, Colorado. The "war" between the railroads was finally settled out of court. Masterson's Colorado activities did not go over well with the voters of Ford County, Kansas. On November 4, 1879, a bartender named George T. Hinkel defeated Masterson in his re-election bid for sheriff by a vote of 404 to 268.

=== Billy Thompson and Buffalo Bill Cody ===
The 1880 Dodge City census shows that, at that time, Masterson was living with Annie Ladue, age 19 (described as his "concubine"). City Marshal James Masterson, Bat's younger brother, was listed on the same census as living with Minnie Roberts, age 16. Not long after this census was taken, Bat Masterson received a telegram from Ben Thompson asking Bat to save Ben's troublesome brother, Billy Thompson, from almost certain lynching in Ogallala, Nebraska. Billy Thompson had shot the thumb off a man named Tucker, who, despite missing a digit, managed to fire back and seriously wound Billy. Masterson took Billy Thompson out of Ogallala by a midnight train bound for North Platte, Nebraska. In North Platte, Masterson was provided with assistance by William F. "Buffalo Bill" Cody, who promptly offered to help. According to Masterson, he and Billy Thompson "were given a royal welcome and were immediately taken in charge by Colonel Cody, who found a safe place for us to remain until he could outfit us for the trip across the country to Dodge City." This episode was reported in the Dodge City Times, which noted that "W.B. Masterson arrived from a visit to Ogallala, this week. He says Nebraska is dry and many people are leaving the state. He came by wagon, and was accompanied by 'Texas Billy' Thompson. The latter has recovered from his wounds."

=== Battle of the plaza ===
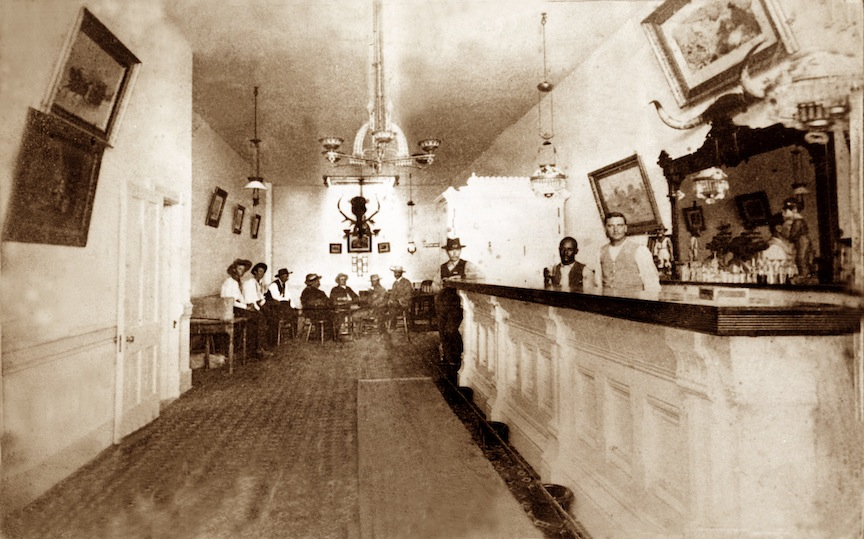
Photograph of the interior of the Long Branch Saloon in Dodge City, Kansas, taken between 1870 and 1885

Masterson spent the remainder of 1880 in Kansas City and Dodge. On February 8, 1881, he left Dodge City and joined Wyatt Earp in Tombstone, Arizona Territory, where he met Luke Short for the first time. Earp, Short, and Masterson worked as faro dealers, or "look outs", at Tombstone's Oriental Saloon. Masterson had been in Tombstone for only two months when he received an urgent telegram that compelled him to return to Dodge City. His brother Jim had a partnership with Alfred James "A.J." Peacock in Dodge City's Lady Gay Saloon and Dance Hall. Albert "Al" Updegraff was Peacock's brother-in-law and bartender. Updegraff was a drunk, and Jim thought him dishonest. Jim had demanded that Peacock fire Updegraff, but Peacock refused. Their disagreement grew until threats were made, prompting the telegram.

Masterson arrived in Dodge City on April 16, 1881, where he accosted Updegraff and Peacock. Recognizing Masterson, Updegraff and Peacock retreated behind the jail and exchanged gunfire with him. Who had fired first is not clear. Citizens ran for cover as bullets ripped through the Long Branch Saloon. Other individuals began firing in support of both sides until Updegraff was wounded. Mayor A.B. Webster arrested Masterson. Afterward, Masterson learned that his brother Jim was not in danger. Updegraff recovered from his wounds, but the shooter who hit him could not be identified, so Masterson was fined $8.00 (equal to $266.90 today) and released. Citizens were outraged and warrants were issued, but Bat and Jim Masterson were permitted to leave Dodge City.

Bat Masterson became more widely known as a gunfighter as a result of a practical joke played on a gullible newspaper reporter in August 1881. Seeking copy in Gunnison, Colorado, the reporter asked Dr. W.S. Cockrell about man-killers. Dr. Cockrell pointed to a young man nearby and said it was Masterson and that he had killed 26 men. Cockrell then regaled the reporter with the story of Ed Masterson's death and how Bat responded fearlessly and heroically against his brother's killers. The story was published in The New York Sun newspaper in New York (November 7, 1881) and was also widely reprinted in papers all over the country. Cockrell subsequently apologized to Masterson, who insisted he was not in Gunnison at the time. Allegedly, long after he retired from being a law officer Masterson would buy old .45 six-guns and "sell" them to gullible persons as "relics" of his Gunfighting days. Ironically, Masterson did own several .45 guns during his lifetime. although (excepting fighting Indians as a Buffalo Hunter and Army scout) Masterson was involved in only four incidents in which two men were killed and two wounded.

=== City marshal of Trinidad, Colorado ===
Masterson was appointed city marshal of Trinidad, Colorado, on April 17, 1882. He had hardly settled into his $75-a-month (equal to $2502.16 today) marshal's job when Wyatt Earp requested his help to prevent the extradition of Doc Holliday from Colorado to Arizona. Masterson took his case directly to Colorado Governor Frederick W. Pitkin, who listened to Masterson's appeal and finally refused to grant Holliday's extradition. However, Masterson's rescue of Doc Holliday, as well as his nightly "moonlighting" as a faro dealer, spelled doom for his career as city marshal of Trinidad. On March 28, 1883, a local paper noted: "There are now two 'bankers' running for city offices—Mr. Taylor of the Las Animas County Bank, and Mr. Masterson of the bank of 'Fair O.' Both have a large number of depositors—one of time depositors and the other receives his deposits for keeps." On April 3, 1883, Masterson was defeated by a lopsided vote of 637 to 248.

=== Dodge City War ===
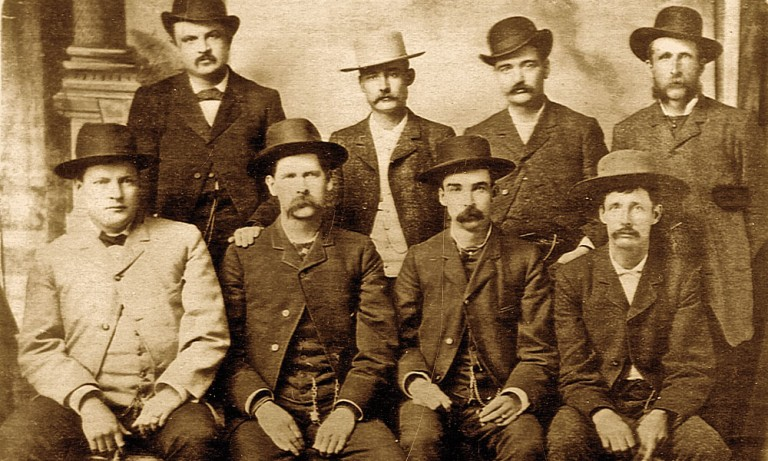
The "Dodge City Peace Commission" on June 10, 1883. From left to right, standing: William H. Harris, Luke Short, Bat Masterson, William F. Petillon; seated: Charlie Bassett, Wyatt Earp, Michael Francis "Frank" McLean and Cornelius "Neil" Brown

Masterson's term as city marshal of Trinidad ended just in time for him to come to the aid of his friend, Luke Short, who had been run out of Dodge City by the mayor and Masterson's long-time enemy, Larry Deger. Within weeks, a group of gunfighters recruited by Masterson and Earp descended upon Dodge City to resolve what became known as the "Dodge City War". The result of this gathering reinstated Luke Short in Dodge. Before disbanding on June 10, 1883, Short, Masterson, Earp, and five other notable men from frontier history posed for a group portrait that was soon labeled "The Dodge City Peace Commission". The photo became an iconic image of the Old West. (Note: On July 21, 1883, The National Police Gazette published an engraving based upon the iconic group photograph taken by Charles A. Conkling just 41 days earlier. It was the first occasion that a version of this group portrait was reproduced for a wide audience and the first time it was provided with the caption by which it remains best known, "The Dodge City Peace Commission".)

=== First attempt at journalism ===
Masterson was back in Dodge City on November 1, 1884, where he issued a small newspaper called Vox Populi which was devoted to local political issues. Three days after its appearance, he received a flattering—and prophetic—review of his journalistic effort from another Dodge City paper which observed: "We are in receipt of the first number of Vox Populi, W.B. Masterson, editor, which in appearance is very neat and tidy. The news and statements it contains seem to be of a somewhat personal nature. The editor is very promising; if he survives the first week of his literary venture, there is no telling what he may accomplish in the journalistic field." Editor Masterson did not survive his first week. Vox Populi folded after printing just one issue and almost another 20 years would pass before he made journalism a full-time profession in New York City.

== Denver ==
Masterson finally left Dodge City and made Denver, Colorado, his center of interest, where he soon became involved in a divorce scandal. The trouble began in a Denver theater on September 18, 1886, when a comedian named Lou Spencer, who was performing on stage, spotted his wife, Nellie, seated in the audience on Masterson's knee. Spencer cut short his routine and confronted Masterson, who hit Spencer across the face with his pistol. Nellie Spencer watched from the wings while the two men slugged it out. Finally, they were arrested, fined, and released a short time later. In its account of the incident, the Rocky Mountain News described Masterson as one "who pleases the ladies", and Nellie McMahon Spencer as "a beautiful woman, with a fine wardrobe and a sweet voice." Three days later, Nellie filed for divorce and the Denver papers were quick to report that Nellie had "eloped" with Masterson. No record has been found of the two ever getting married, and she soon disappeared from Masterson's life.

Masterson dealt faro for "Big Ed" Chase at the Arcade gambling house. In 1888, he managed and then purchased the Palace Variety Theater. There, Masterson probably first met an Indian club swinger and singer, Emma Moulton. The pair subsequently lived together and they were widely reported to have married in Denver on November 21, 1891. The only known source for that date was given by Masterson's brother, Thomas Masterson, years after Bat had died. Emma was not divorced from her first husband, Edwin Winford Moulton, until November 9, 1893. When they were later enumerated in the 1910 U.S. census, Bat and Emma claimed that they had been married for 17 years, suggesting a marriage date of 1893. Masterson's biographer has raised the possibility that they were married on November 21, 1893, two weeks after Emma's divorce from Edwin Moulton. The two were traveling through the eastern states at that time, but an actual marriage record has not been found.

It was in Denver that Masterson met and began a long-term friendship with the infamous confidence man and crime boss Soapy Smith. In 1889, the two were involved in election scandal involving fraudulent registration ballot casting.

=== Prizefighting ===
Masterson maintained an interest in prizefighting and other sports, and was known as a frequent attendee at boxing matches across the country. He frequently placed bets on the fights and occasionally served in an official capacity as a second or a timekeeper. He knew—and was known by—the heavyweight champions of the era, from John L. Sullivan and James J. "Gentleman Jim" Corbett to Jack Johnson and Jack Dempsey. The sports-minded Masterson was ringside during the John L. Sullivan–Jake Kilrain heavyweight championship fight at Richburg, Mississippi, on July 8, 1889. He was the designated timekeeper for Kilrain and came under fire from some sources for how he handled his role. Reportedly, Masterson saw to it that Luke Short, Johnny Murphy, and "twelve other good men were scattered around the ring where they would do the most good in case of an emergency."

In early 1892 Masterson moved to the silver boom-town of Creede, Colorado, where he managed the Denver Exchange gambling club until the town was destroyed by fire on June 5, 1892. On September 7, 1892, Masterson, Short, and Charlie Bassett attended the Sullivan–Corbett championship fight in New Orleans. According to a Dodge City paper, Masterson bet on the winner, Corbett, while noting, "Charlie Bassett and Luke Short were among the notables in attendance. Bassett bet his money on Sullivan." Masterson was in Jacksonville, Florida, on January 25, 1894, acting as a second for Charlie Mitchell during Mitchell's heavyweight title shot at the champion, James J. "Gentleman Jim" Corbett. Mitchell was knocked cold in three rounds.

=== Last years in Denver ===
Masterson moved to New York City in 1895 to briefly serve as a bodyguard for millionaire George Gould. He wrote to his Denver friends glowing accounts of fishing trips "...with the Goulds on their yacht..." and announced his intention to remain in New York City indefinitely. On June 6, 1895, a Denver paper quoted a friend of Masterson's, who observed that "Bat has at last fallen into a dead easy game."

Masterson returned to Denver for several more years. On April 6, 1897, serving as a deputy sheriff of Arapahoe County, he got into a dispute on election day with a Tim Connors. Masterson drew his pistol and Connors attempted to seize it. During the scuffle, the gun discharged and C.C. Louderbaugh was shot in the left wrist.

On April 9, 1899, Masterson became a partner in a boxing club called the Colorado Athletic Association. Within a few days, Masterson was excluded from the organization by his partners. Masterson retaliated on April 18 by founding a rival club, the Olympic, with himself as president. Masterson received favorable media coverage from a Denver newspaper called George's Weekly, where he was employed as sports editor.

In September 1900, Masterson sold his interest in the Olympic Athletic Club and made another visit to New York City. Masterson had decided to settle in New York City, but had a sudden change of heart and returned to Denver, with humiliating results. Two conflicting versions are given for what caused his final departure from Denver. Masterson's story was that an irate woman belted him with an umbrella on May 2, 1902, when she took exception to an "undesirable" such as Masterson trying to cast his ballot at a local election. An alternative version states that Masterson had become a dangerous drunk who was run out of Denver for being a public nuisance. Whatever actually happened, Masterson left Denver and never returned.

== New York ==
=== Journalism career ===
Masterson and Emma moved to New York City on June 5, 1902. The next day, Masterson was having his shoes shined at a public stand when police swooped in and arrested a West Coast gambler named James A. Sullivan, who was standing nearby. They took Masterson, too, alleging he was part of a bunco scheme to fleece a Mormon elder named George H. Snow out of $16,000. Masterson also had a concealed revolver. The bunco charge was dismissed. Masterson paid a $10 fine for the concealed weapon. About his arrest, Masterson complained to a reporter, "This fellow Gargan who arrested me is a warm baby—in his mind. He thinks all people are suckers. That's the trouble with these mush-headed coppers. Give them a political job to keep from starving and they think they own the earth."

A friend, journalist, Alfred Henry Lewis, persuaded his brother, William Lewis, to provide Masterson with employment as a columnist for William's newspaper, the New York Morning Telegraph. His column, "Masterson's Views on Timely Topics," concerned sports in general and boxing in particular. The column appeared thrice weekly from 1903 until his death in 1921. In 1905, Alfred Henry Lewis published The Sunset Trail, a fictionalized biography of Masterson.

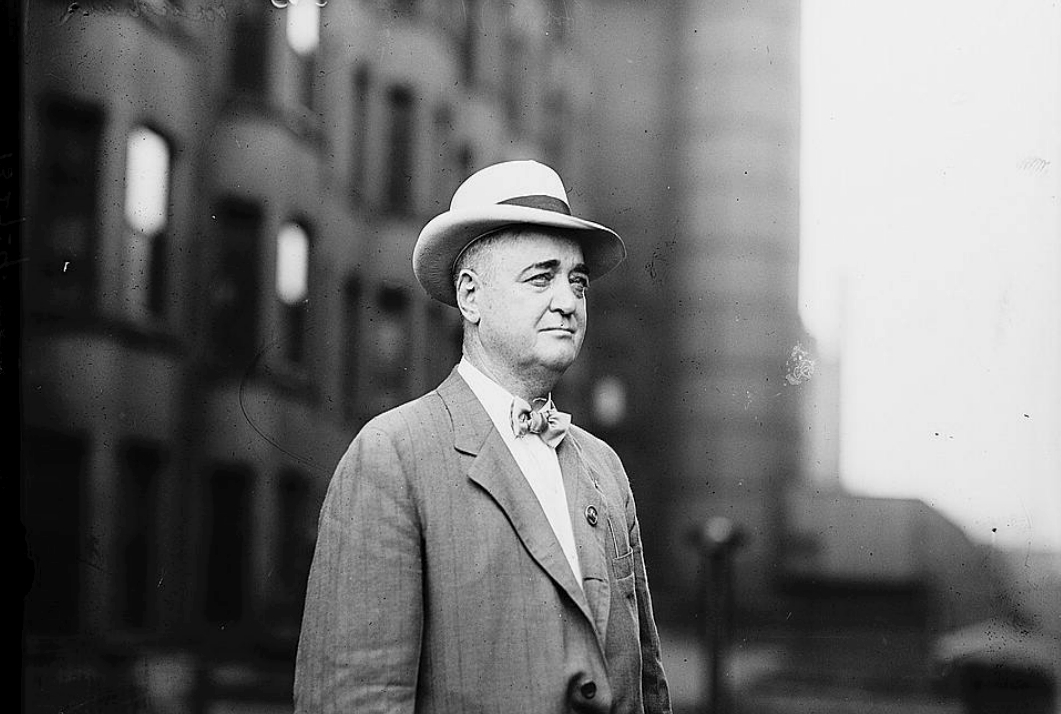
Bat Masterson circa 1911 in New York City

Lewis encouraged Masterson to write a series of sketches about his adventures, which were published by Lewis in Human Life magazine. (Note: The full title of the magazine was Human Life: The Magazine About People Edited by Alfred Henry Lewis.) In 1907, Masterson provided five biographical studies of Ben Thompson, Wyatt Earp, Luke Short, Doc Holliday and Bill Tilghman.

Masterson explained to his audience what he felt were the best properties of a gunfighter. Other articles were supposed to be in Masterson's Human Life series, which had appeared under the title of "Famous Gun Fighters of the Western Frontier", but the next three issues of Human Life came and went without a Masterson article. In the November 1907 issue, editor Alfred Henry Lewis assured the readers that Masterson would resume the series by explaining that Masterson's reasons for "breaking off the output" were "wholly of an idle, indolent, midsummer sort, which the managers of this magazine hope to overthrow so soon as a cooler temperature comes to the assistance of their arguments." Lewis offered this apology as part of his own article called "The King of the Gun-Players: William Barclay Masterson." Lewis met with only limited success. Masterson provided only one more article, on Buffalo Bill Cody, which was his final Human Life contribution.

Concurrent to his career as a newspaper writer, Masterson served as the timekeeper for many prize fights, most notably for the Jack Johnson—Jess Willard title fight in Havana, Cuba, on April 5, 1915. A newsreel featuring the then 61-year-old Masterson's introduction in that role was included in a documentary called Legendary Champions 1882–1929.

=== Presidential appointment ===
Alfred Henry Lewis introduced Masterson to President Theodore Roosevelt, and the two formed a friendship that resulted in Masterson being a frequent White House guest and also included regular correspondence. President Roosevelt arranged for Masterson's appointment as deputy U.S. Marshal for the Southern District of New York. On February 2, 1905, Roosevelt wrote Masterson a letter which concluded with the lines: "You must be careful not to gamble or do anything while you are a public officer which might afford opportunity to your enemies and my critics to say that your appointment was improper. I wish you to show this letter to Alfred Henry Lewis and go over the matter with him." Masterson served in the position, earning $2,000 per year (equal to $71,667 today), until 1909. Theodore Roosevelt did not seek a third term in 1908, and his successor, William Howard Taft, did not share Roosevelt's enthusiasm for Masterson. President Taft had his attorney general conduct an investigation of Masterson's employment as a deputy U.S. Marshal, which resulted in Masterson being terminated on August 1, 1909. For the remaining 12 years of his life, Masterson covered the major boxing events of that era for the New York Morning Telegraph.

On April 5, 1915, the 61-year-old Masterson was in Havana, Cuba, attending the heavyweight championship fight between Jack Johnson and Jess Willard. As he arrived, he posed for a newsreel cameraman. In the brief film clip, he doffs his hat, smiles for the camera, and dons his hat. Later that day, in the official film of the fight, Masterson can be seen as one of the seconds for Jess Willard, climbing through the ropes just prior to the fight.

== Final days ==
On July 2, 1921, Masterson attended his last heavyweight championship fight, the so-called "Million Dollar Gate", promoted by George "Tex" Rickard, in which Jack Dempsey defended (and retained) his title of heavyweight champion of the world. Three months later, on October 7, silent-screen cowboy star William S. Hart visited Masterson. They were photographed standing together on the roof of the New York Morning Telegraph building and went back to Masterson's office where he asked Hart to sit in his chair and pose for a second photo with him. According to Hart: "I did so, and he stood beside me. Mr. Masterson was sitting in that same chair eighteen days later when he heard the last call." Hart subsequently cast a lookalike as Masterson in his biographical film Wild Bill Hickok, which was released in 1923.

=== Death and burial ===
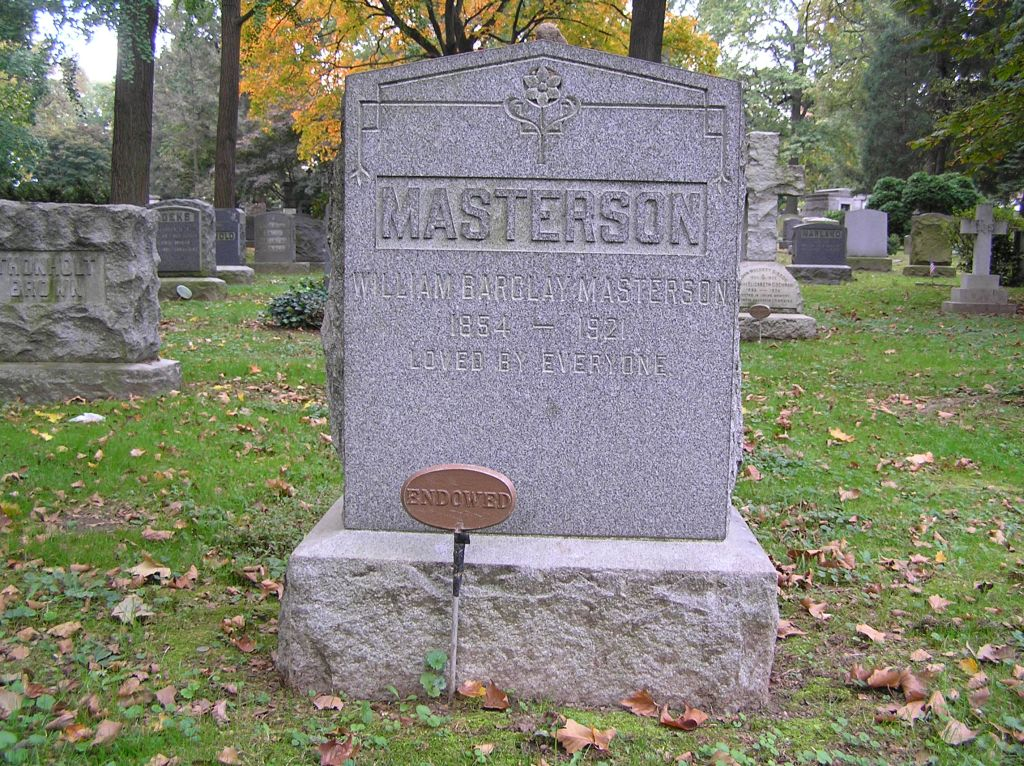
The grave of Bat Masterson

On October 25, 1921, at age 67, Masterson died at his desk from a massive heart attack after writing what became his final column for the Morning Telegraph.

His last column included this statement "I suppose these ginks who argue that ... because the rich man gets ice in the summer and the poor man gets it in the winter, things are breaking even for both. Maybe so, but I'll swear I can't see it that way."

About 500 people attended Masterson's service at Frank E. Campbell's Funeral Church at Broadway and 66th Street. Masterson's honorary pallbearers included Damon Runyon, Tex Rickard, and William Lewis. Runyon was a close friend of Masterson's and offered this memorable eulogy: "He was a 100 percent, 22-karat real man. Bat was a good hater and a wonderful friend. He was always stretching out his hand to some down-and-outer. He had a great sense of humor and a marvelous fund of reminiscence, and was one of the most entertaining companions we have ever known. There are only too few men in the world like Bat Masterson and his death is a genuine loss."

Masterson was buried at Woodlawn Cemetery in the Bronx. His first name, Bartholemew, does not appear on his gravestone. Instead, it is inscribed "William Barclay Masterson" (see photo). Masterson's epitaph states that he was "Loved by Everyone".

== In popular culture ==
Masterson's life has been portrayed in countless works of fiction and non-fiction in film, television, literature, and other popular media.

=== Novels and comic books ===
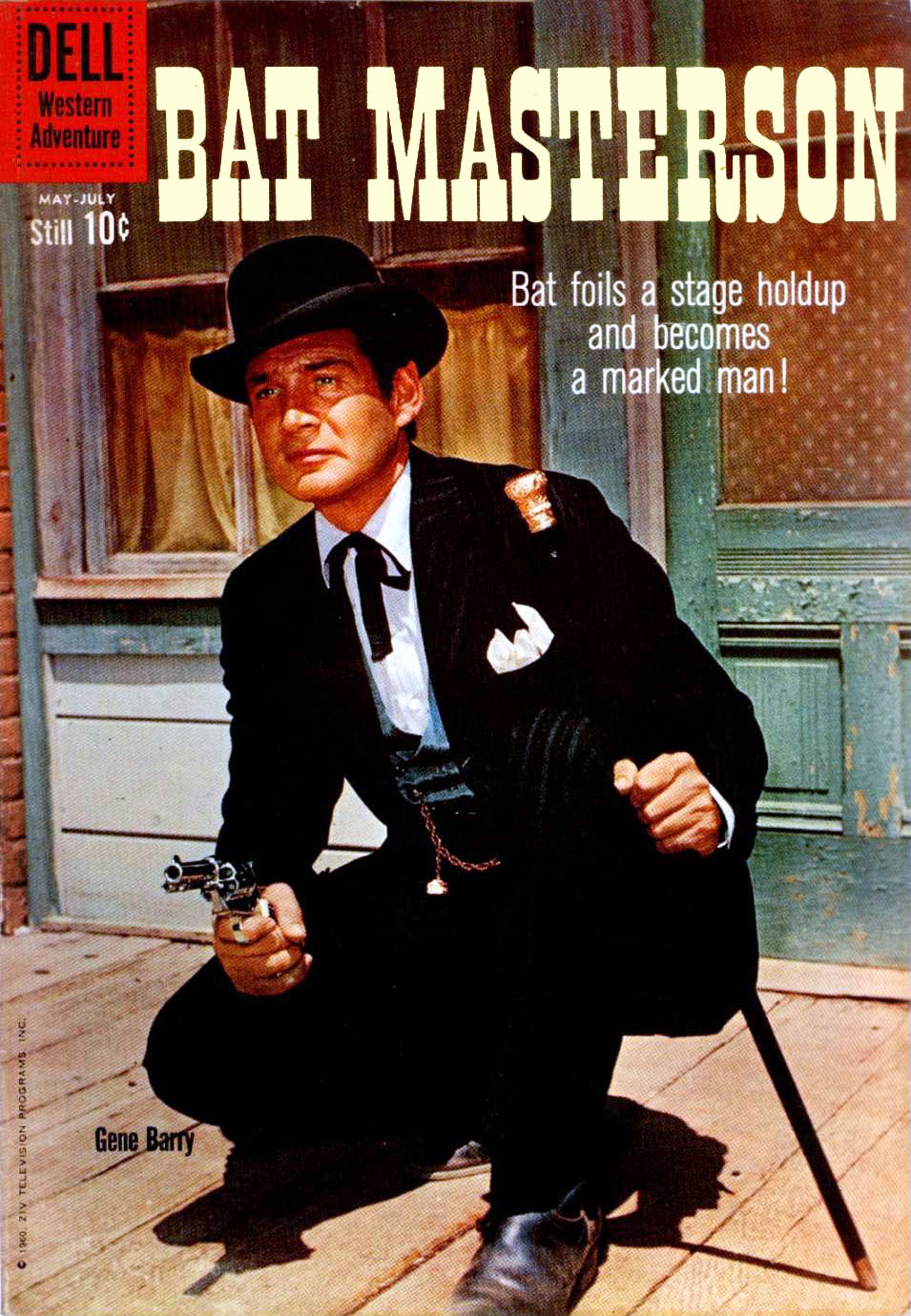
Front cover of Bat Masterson number 3 (Dell Comics, June 1960), featuring a publicity still of Gene Barry.

- Eleven years after Masterson's death, a collection of Damon Runyon's short stories was published under the title Guys and Dolls. These stories later formed the basis for the classic 1950 musical comedy of the same name. The central character in Runyon's Guys and Dolls was a high-rolling gambler from Colorado whom Runyon barely disguised under the name of Sky Masterson.
- Because of his reputation as a fearless gunslinger, Masterson's presence at a poker game spoils an attempted holdup in You Can't Win, the autobiography of professional criminal Jack Black.
- Bat Masterson, along with many other historical figures of the time, is a character in the novel The Buntline Special (2010) by Mike Resnick.
- Dell Comics published a short-lived comic book based on the television series. The first issue was published as Four Color Comics #1013, followed by Bat Masterson #2–9 (1960–1962). All the issues had photographic covers. The stories were scripted by Gaylord DuBois and mostly drawn by Jerry Robinson.
- The 1986 novel The Ham Reporter by Robert J. Randisi features Bat Masterson as an investigating newspaperman.
- The comic series The Life and Times of Scrooge McDuck by Don Rosa portrayed Masterson alongside Wyatt Earp, Soapy Smith, and hanging Judge Roy Bean.
- The 2011 novel The Gunsmith #351 (The Trial of Bat Masterson) by Robert J. Randisi describes a time in which fictional character Clint Adams comes to the aid of his friend Bat Masterson, who has been wrongly accused of murder and is being pursued by the "victim's" brother. Many references are made to Masterson as one of Adams' closest friends throughout the series.
- The 2015 novel And the Wind Whispered by Dan Jorgensen features Bat Masterson as one of the key characters in a book set in 1894 Hot Springs, South Dakota. In it, he joins forces with famed reporter Nellie Bly and Sheriff Seth Bullock to help thwart an outlaw gang's incursion on the city and attempts to rob visiting (and vacationing) dignitaries in the southern Black Hills community.

=== Film ===
- Albert Dekker portrayed Bat Masterson in the 1943 film The Woman of the Town.
- Randolph Scott portrayed Masterson in the 1947 film Trail Street.
- Steve Darrell portrayed Masterson (uncredited) in the 1950 film Winchester 73.
- Frank Ferguson portrayed Masterson in the 1951 film Santa Fe.
- George Montgomery portrayed Masterson in the 1954 film Masterson of Kansas.
- Keith Larsen portrayed Masterson in the 1955 film Wichita.
- Kenneth Tobey portrayed Masterson in the 1957 film Gunfight at the O.K. Corral.
- Joel McCrea portrayed Masterson in the 1959 film The Gunfight at Dodge City.
- Tom Sizemore portrayed Masterson in the 1994 movie Wyatt Earp.
- Matt Dallas portrayed Masterson in the 2012 film Wyatt Earp's Revenge.

=== Television ===
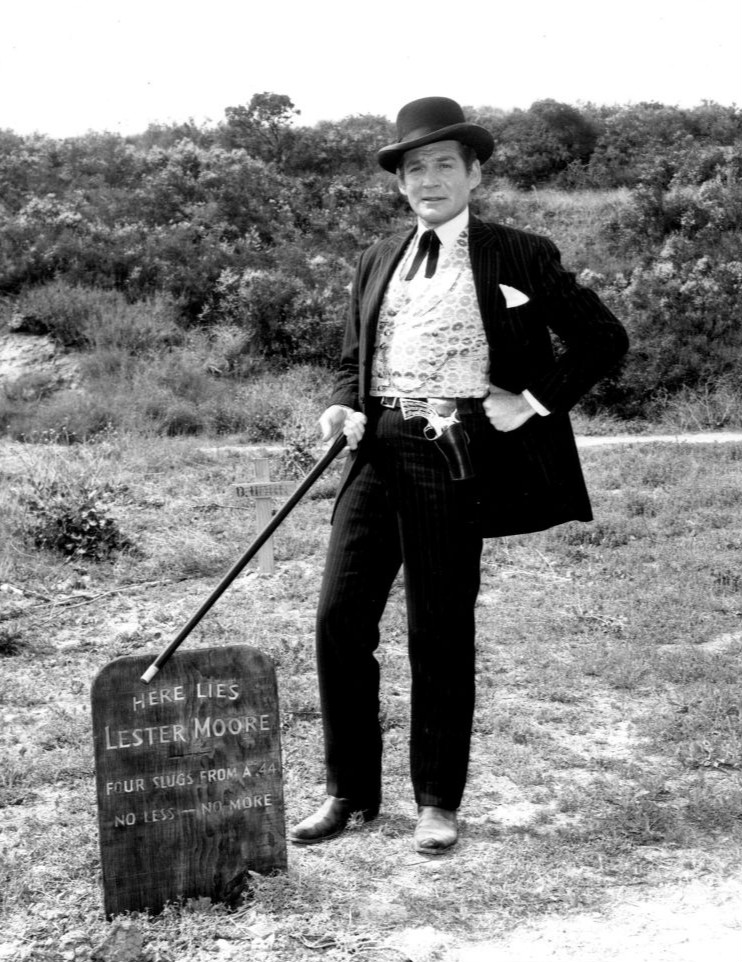
Gene Barry as Masterson in Bat Masterson (1959)

- Mason Alan Dinehart III played Masterson from 1955 to 1959 in 34 episodes of the ABC Western series, The Life and Legend of Wyatt Earp, starring Hugh O'Brian in the title role.
- Bat Masterson was an American television series loosely based on the historical character. Masterson was portrayed by Gene Barry. Bat Masterson aired on NBC in 108 episodes from October 8, 1958, to June 1, 1961, and featured Masterson as a superbly dressed gambler, generally outfitted in a black suit and derby hat, who was more inclined to "bat" crooks over the head with his gold-knobbed cane than shoot them. Hundreds of thousands of plastic derby hats and canes were sold as children's toys during the show's run.
- Animators William Hanna and Joseph Barbera satirized Masterson in a 1964 Punkin' Puss and Mushmouse cartoon, "Bat Mouseterson", in which Mushmouse's city-dwelling, cane-wielding cousin comes to hill country for a visit and teaches Mushmouse the gentleman's way of warding off Punkin' Puss.
- Richard Beale portrayed Bat Masterson in the 1966 Doctor Who serial The Gunfighters, which depicts the events leading to and including the famous O.K. Corral gunfight.
- A character called "Bat Masterson" appears in the 1980s Western series Bordertown in the episode "Nebraska Lightning", where he helps the fictional characters U.S. Marshal Jack Craddock and Canadian Northwest Mountie Corporal Clive Bennett take on the Nebraska Lightning Gang.
- In one episode of Beakman's World, Beakman portrayed himself in a short film as Masterson when teaching about how actors do not injure themselves when doing things that are meant to cause injury.
- Gene Barry reprised his role as Masterson in the episode "A Gathering of Guns" (1987) on the television series Guns of Paradise (Hugh O'Brian also reprised his role as Wyatt Earp).
- A man claiming to be Bat Masterson, portrayed by Philip Bosco and credited as Mike Killabrew, appears in the series Early Edition in a 1997 episode titled "Bat Masterson".
- Masterson, portrayed by Steven Ogg, appears in the October 20, 2014 Canadian television period detective series Murdoch Mysteries episode "Glory Days", going to Toronto in pursuit of famous outlaws and clashing with the local constabulary's style of investigation.
- A character called Bat Masterson is played by Matthew Le Nevez in the 2015 Lifetime TV series, The Lizzie Borden Chronicles, a counter-history to the legend of Lizzie Borden.
- Masterson is played by Jack Elliott in the 2021 INSP TV series Wild West Chronicles, a retelling of true stories behind the West's incredible events.

=== Gaming ===
- In the 2004 video game Red Dead Revolver, the character of Jack Swift is based on Bat Masterson.
- In Sidewinder: Wild West Adventures, both original quotations and fictional quotations attributed to Bat Masterson are used throughout the rulebook.
- Bat Masterson is used as a non-player character in Pirate101.
- Bat Masterson makes an appearance as a railroad manager in Railroad Tycoon 2 and Railroad Tycoon 3. As the railroad's chairman, a player can choose to employ him and enjoy a lower incidence rate of costly train robberies while Masterson is employed.

=== Theater ===
- Masterson plays an important role in the play Bat Masterson's Creede, a play written by Tony Clark about Masterson and the important role he played in the silver boomtown of Creede, Colorado.

== See also ==
- Gray County War

== Notes ==
Police appointments
Preceded by Charlie Bassett	Sheriff of Ford County, Kansas; November 9, 1877–November 4, 1879	Succeeded by George T. Hinkel
Preceded by Lou Kreegler	City Marshal of Trinidad, Colorado; April 17, 1882–April 3, 1883	Succeeded by Lou Kreegler
