= Short–Courtright duel =

1887 gunfight between gunfighters Luke Short and Jim Courtright

Short–Courtright Duel
- Date: February 8, 1887
- Location: Fort Worth, Texas, United States
- Participants: Luke Short; Jim Courtright
- Deaths: 1

The Short–Courtright duel was a gunfight that happened on February 8, 1887 in Fort Worth, Texas between gunfighters Luke Short and Jim Courtright. The gunfight resulted in Courtright's death. Being one of the most significant shootouts in the American Old West, the duel is remembered today as one of the rare cases of a one-on-one quick-draw pistol duel in history, and is commemorated through a number of art and reenactments over the years.

== Background ==
Born in 1854 in Polk County, Luke Short grew up in Texas and worked as a cowboy before serving as a U.S. Army scout during the Indian Wars. By the late 1870s, he had become a professional gambler, moving among boomtowns such as Leadville, Tombstone, and Dodge City. He used the earnings he made to buy the White Elephant Saloon after settling in Fort Worth, Texas. In 1881, Short gained national attention when he shot and killed gambler Charlie Storms in a self-defense gunfight outside the Oriental Saloon. On the other hand, Jim Courtright was born in Illinois in 1845, and was believed to have served in the Union Army during the American Civil War before drifting west in search of opportunity. Courtright settled in Fort Worth and became the city's marshal for three terms in the 1870s. He then took up a number of occupations from detective to hired gun, and had been suspected of several murders, before deciding to open a protection racket. Prior to the duel, both Short and Courtright were friends.

== Gunfight ==
On the night of February 8, 1887, an argument broke out between Luke Short and Jim Courtright about the latter's persistence in demanding money from Short's establishment for protection. An infuriated Courtright stormed from the saloon but later returned with two revolvers visibly holstered in his pockets. He yelled for Luke Short to come out, but Jake Johnson, a friend of both men, tried to calm Courtright down. Short met with the two men outside and talked about their dispute as they walked through the street. The group, however, suddenly stopped at Ella Blackwell's Shooting Gallery. Luke Short was facing Courtright three to four feet away when Courtright suddenly went for his pistol, making Short draw his own in return. In the gunfight that followed, Short was the last man standing. In his own words, Short described what happened:

Early in the evening ... I was at the bar with a couple of friends when someone called me. I went out into the vestibule and saw Jim Courtright and Jake Johnson ... I walked out with them upon the sidewalk, and we had some quiet talk on private affairs. I reminded him of some past transactions, not in an abusive or reproachful manner, to which he assented, but not in a very cordial way. I was standing with my thumbs in the armholes of my vest and had dropped them in front of me to adjust my clothing, when he remarked, 'Well, you needn't reach for your gun,' and immediately put his hand in his hip pocket and pulled his. When I saw him do that, I pulled my pistol and began shooting, for I knew that his action meant death. He must have misconstrued my intention in dropping my hands before me. I was merely adjusting my clothing, and never carry a pistol in that part of my dress.

Jake Johnson, one of the primary witnesses of the case, also gave his testimony of what had happened. He said:

They were three or four feet apart while talking. Luke had his thumbs in the armholes of his vest, then he dropped them in front of him, when Courtright said, "You needn't be getting out your gun." Luke said, “I haven't got any gun here, Jim," and raised up his vest to show him. Courtright then drew his pistol. He drew it first and then Short drew his and commenced to fire.

The showdown was also witnessed by Bat Masterson, who was with Luke Short at the time. In 1907, Masterson published his own account of the events, where he stated that Jim Courtright, carrying a "brace of pistols", challenged Luke Short to a duel:

No time was wasted in the exchange of words once the men faced each other. Both drew their pistols at the same time, but as usual, Short's spoke first and a bullet from a Colt's 45-calibre pistol went crashing through Courtright's body. The shock caused him to reel backward; then he got another and still another, and by the time his lifeless form had reached the floor, Luke had succeeded in shooting him five times.

== Aftermath ==
Investigations of the gunfight concluded that while Courtright went for his pistol first, Short ultimately outdrew and killed him. Short's first shot actually took off Courtright's right thumb, forcing the latter to perform what was known as a "border shift", where one gunman transfers his pistol to another hand. However, Short's follow-up shots to Courtright's right shoulder and heart, eventually put him down. Several explanations for Courtright's inability to fire his gun were theorized. One possibility presented was that his pistol broke when one of Short's bullets struck it and his thumb, or that his pistol got caught on his watch chain for a second as he drew it. Western historian Robert K. DeArment considered these reasons as unlikely or "feeble excuses".

The gunfight became well known due to the notoriety of both men. Courtright's funeral was attended by hundreds of Fort Worth residents. Short was arrested for the shooting, and was nearly lynched. He received a preliminary hearing and was released after posting a $2,000 bond, but the case never went to trial. Following Courtright's death, his children relocated to California. Short was eventually able to settle his legal problems with the court in Dallas, Texas, where all of the cases against him were dismissed with no explanation.

== Legacy ==
The duel was portrayed in an episode about Jim Courtright in the 1955 half-hour syndicated television series, Stories of the Century, with Robert Knapp as Courtright and Wally Cassell as Luke Short.

A painting entitled Coming Up Short was also created by Bob Graham in 2003. The White Elephant Saloon was reopened in 1970 at the Fort Worth Stockyards, and every February 8, there is a reenactment of the famous gunfight that is free to watch.
