= Long Branch Variety Show =

Coordinates: 37°45′14″N 100°01′19″W

The Long Branch Variety Show is a western saloon show presented in the Long Branch Saloon located at Boot Hill Museum, a non-profit entertainment and museum theme park in Dodge City, Kansas.

The exterior of the new Long Branch Saloon was built in 1958 and modeled on period photographs of the original Long Branch Saloon building, which burned down in 1885 and was not rebuilt. The interior is largely based on the Gunsmoke television show and is consistent with period saloons of the era. It is furnished with an 1881 bar and two Golden Eagles on top of the back bar that were once owned by Chalkley Beeson.

It features actors portraying characters including Miss Kitty, the "Queen of Dodge City" and Chalkley Beeson, the saloon owner. The show was initially presented during the summer of 1958 as a temporary offering over the 4th of July holiday. The show proved so popular that it was continued. It has been presented seven nights a week during the summer months since then, making it one of the longest running seasonal shows of its type in the nation.

== Origin ==
The original Doc & Kitty - Lewis & Rosemary Mock.

The original concept for the show was developed by Rosemary & Lewis Mock. Dr. Mock was a local Dodge City optometrist and his wife was noted as a local entertainer and both were well-suited to form the show. The 1958 reconstruction of the first six buildings of Front Street in Dodge City, was built at the base of what had become known as Boot Hill where early inhabitants of Dodge City who met an unfortunate demise were "buried with their boots on." One of those original six buildings was the new Long Branch Saloon. The Long Branch was known for its entertainment since an early owner was Chalkley Beeson who formed the original Dodge City Cowboy Band. It made sense that the reconstructed saloon should have some sort of show. The Mocks approached the museum director about providing entertainment in the saloon and were given the go-ahead to develop the early show.

== Gunsmoke ==
The TV show Gunsmoke premiered in 1955 and brought Dodge City much publicity. The traveling public was also enamored with the new medium of television and so they wanted to visit this place called Dodge City and belly-up to the bar in the Long Branch Saloon and hoped to get a glimpse of Miss Kitty and Marshal Matt Dillon.

The very first Long Branch Variety Show did not feature Miss Kitty, but rather starred Mrs. Mock portraying Dora Hand, who was an entertainer in the saloons and theaters of early Dodge City. As more and more travelers visited Boot Hill and the Long Branch Saloon, their first questions were "Where is Kitty?" Visitors expected to see Kitty at the Long Branch Saloon so Dora Hand was replaced with Miss Kitty.

Members of the original cast of Gunsmoke visited in the early days of the show including a special ceremony to rename a downtown Dodge City street to Gunsmoke Avenue. James Arness (Matt Dillon), Amanda Blake (Kitty), Milburn Stone (Doc Adams), and Ken Curtis (Festus) all visited Dodge City and its Long Branch Saloon.

== History ==
For the first nine years, Mrs. Mock portrayed Miss Kitty and Dr. Mock provided piano accompaniment and because of his profession, he acquired the nickname "Doc". Many of the early musical numbers were written by Mrs. Mock. Tunes such as "She Runs an Elegant Place", "Best Saloon in the West", and "How'd You Like to Teepee with Me?" were numbers created by the Mocks for the show. Early versions of the show included a quick-draw contest, dramatic readings, and dance numbers. Local young women became part of the dance troupe, presenting one specialty number as well as the Can-Can at each performance. Mrs. Mock also wrote the original show theme song "Down at the Long Branch Saloon". The song was used for the first nine years and then was lost to history for a number years after it was replaced in 1967. In the early 2000s, the song returned to the show and is currently featured as the finale.

At the end of the 1966 season, Rosemary & Lewis Mock, the original "Doc & Kitty" retired. Nine summers of seven nights a week was exhausting and they were ready for a rest. The 1967 season would see an all new cast which included Nellis Reinert, a local Dodge City housewife and member of Sweet Adelines who was chosen to portray Miss Kitty now billed as the "Queen of Dodge City". The cast may have changed, but the basic format remained the same. A new show theme song was introduced, "The Long Branch Saloon in Dodge City" and was used until 1983 when it was replaced. It too, was lost to history for a few years, but was used in the Christmas versions of the Long Branch Variety Show in the late 1980s (with seasonal lyrics). The original version was reintroduced in 2010 as the opening number of the show.

At the end of the 1975 season, Mrs. Reinert announced her retirement and Connie Hudnett was selected to take over as the Queen of Dodge City. A Deerfield, Kansas, native, Mrs. Hudnett was a homemaker but had a theatrical background. She began in the summer of 1976 and Mrs. Reinert continued part-time as backup. During Mrs. Hudnett's tenure the show flourished, still riding the wave of popularity created by the TV show Gunsmoke. There was also an expansion of the entertainment offered at Boot Hill Museum and a daytime version of the Long Branch Variety Show was added. This was an abbreviated version of the evening show and was presented several times throughout the day. The daytime version was discontinued after only one or two seasons. Mrs. Hudnett continued in the role of Miss Kitty until 1985 when she was replaced by Hutchinson, Kansas native - Roberta Scott. Ms. Scott was followed by Mischel Raney Miller in 1988 who played the role until 1993.

Over the next 15 years, the show continued with various changes to the style and content, but the basic format has remained the same. The role of Chalkley Beeson was expanded, even to the point that Miss Kitty took a variety act role rather than being the hostess of the show. In recent years, the role of Miss Kitty was expanded back to what it originally was and the current version more closely resembles the original format of the Rosemary Mock years.

In 2017, the show opened for its 60th season.

== Acts and shows ==
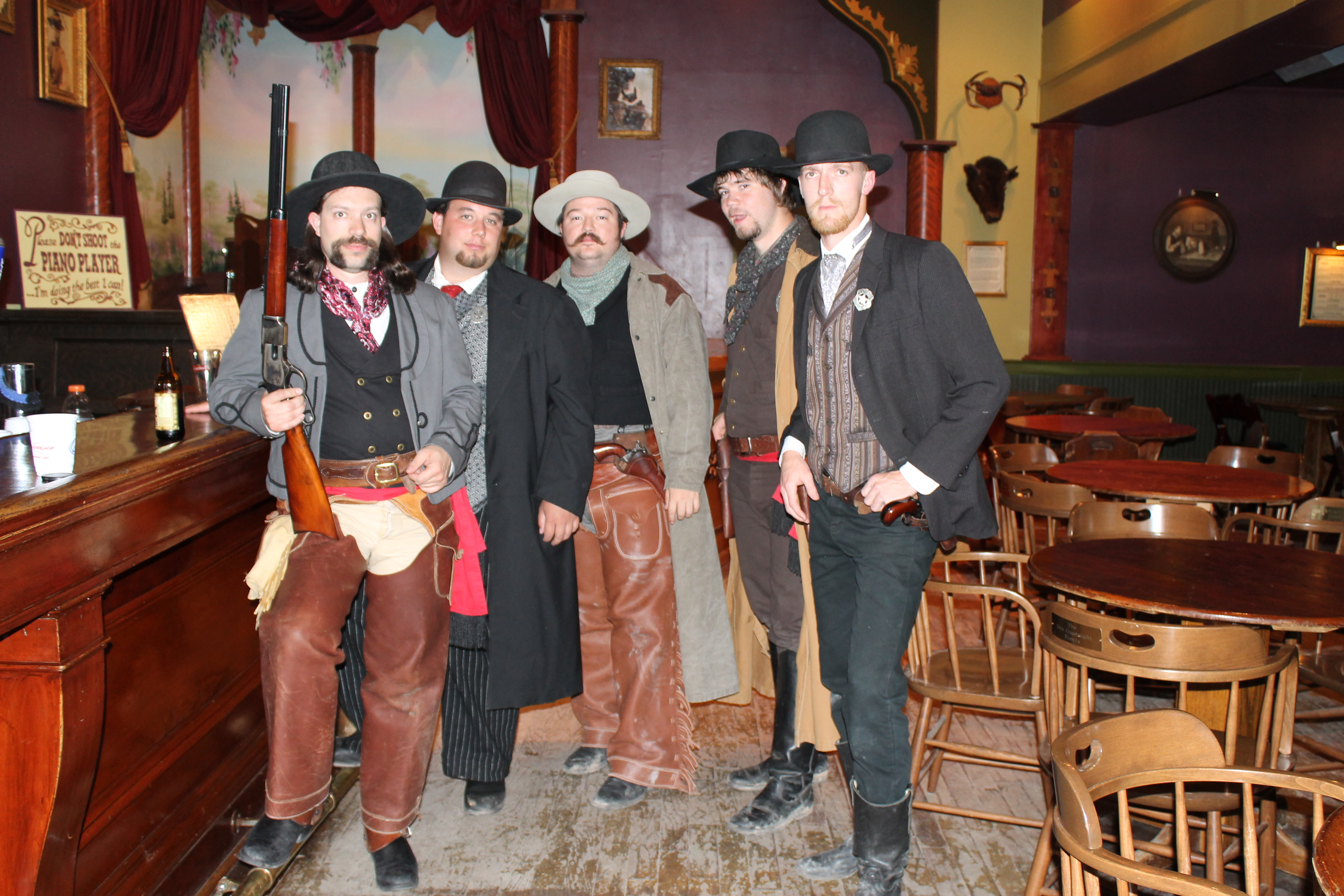
Local actors portray gunfighters.

Through the years, a number of local Dodge City actors and actresses have created variety acts for the Long Branch Variety Show. Local men and women have presented a gunfight in front of the saloon nightly prior to the Long Branch Variety Show and it has become just as popular as the show itself. The gunfight troupe strives to present authentic period costuming and also maintains a safety council to make sure that adequate safety precautions are met not only for the gunfighters themselves, but the audience as well. Training in proper handling of firearms and stunt fighting is required of all persons performing in the gunfights.

== Theme songs ==
Rosemary Mock introduced the first show theme song entitled "Down at the Long Branch Saloon". Sheet music for the piece was sold as a souvenir of the show which included a photo of Mrs. Mock as Dodge City Kitty on the front. The song was used in the show until 1966 and was re-introduced sometime after 2000 and is currently the show finale. The copyright is currently held by Mrs. Mock.

A new theme song - "The Long Branch Saloon in Dodge City" - was introduced in 1967 and was written by JoAnn Bock, Bruce Dillman, and George Henrichs. It was used until 1984 in the summer show and was used in a few Christmas shows in the late 1980s. It was reintroduced in 2010 as the show opening number. The copyright for this song is currently held by Boot Hill Museum.

A third show theme song, "When You're in Dodge City", was introduced in 1984 and was written by Don Steele (who holds the copyright). It was used from 1984 until 1994.

== See also ==
- Long Branch Saloon, the original historic establishment
