= Pecos War =

1876-1877 range war in Pecos River, New Mexico

- Part of the Range Wars and American Indian Wars
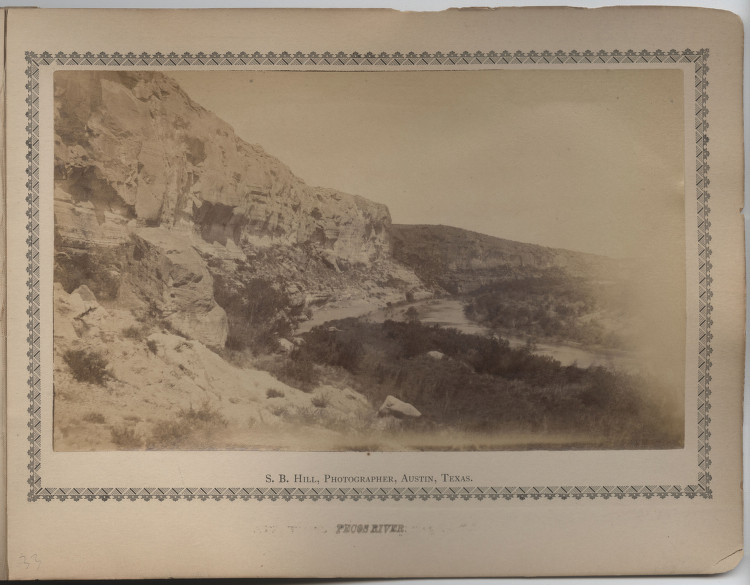
- The Pecos River as seen in the 1880s, where the conflict took its name
- Date: 1876 - 1877
- Location: Pecos River, New Mexico
- Caused by: Stock and grazing dispute
- Result: Inconclusive

Parties
Jinglebob Ranch	Seven Rivers Warriors	Mescalero Apache

Lead figures
John Chisum; James "Jim" Highsaw	Henry "Hugh" M. Beckwith	Frederick C. Godfrey

Number
Unknown	Unknown	Unknown

Casualties and losses
2 killed	5 killed	Unknown but many killed

The Pecos War, also known as the War of the Pecos and the Chisum War, was a range war fought by cattle baron John Chisum against neighboring small ranchers, farmers, and Native Americans from 1876-1877 along the Pecos River in New Mexico. The conflict was caused primarily by competition as Chisum believed that his livestock and other resources were being depleted by people he alleged to be rustlers. At the same time, Chisum was also fighting Mescalero Apaches from the nearby reservations who were said to prey on his herds, rustling his cattle.

== Background ==
In 1867, Chisum and his brothers began driving cattle on a route that would later be called the Chisum Trail. They later established a cow camp in Bosque Grand and from then on, Chisum would take claims all across New Mexico. By 1872, he had become a well-established cattleman in the territory including in Roswell. One of the claims he staked was over the wide grasslands along the Pecos River for his cattle business. By 1875, his business had grown to 80,000 cattle.

His claim, however, placed him in odds with several smaller ranching families who had settled from Texas at the same year as him, as well as the Apache at the nearby Mescalero Indian Reservation. During that time, much of the frontier was in public domain, and the land was free to whoever staked a claim first. Herds of cattle were allowed to roam and graze around the frontier. And these cattle were identified through the use of special brands that belonged to different ranches. Much of the better lands for grazing was overtaken by Chisum and his Jinglebob Ranch.

Chisum would nickname these people as “little fellows”, or simply "thieves", and he believed many of them were rustlers who were stealing from his herd of cattle to sell as their own. This resulted in him recruiting and arming cowboys and ranch hands to protect his property, led by Jim Highsaw, who was described by a contemporary as “quick as lightning on the draw [and] cool under any circumstances.” Many of the smaller ranch communities, especially those with alleged criminal history, formed the Seven Rivers Warriors gang to defend against Chisum’s aggression. These included Buck Powell, Dick Smith, Andy Boyle, the Beckwith clan, W. H. Johnson, Jake Owen, Lewis Paxton, Nathan Underwood, Milo Pierce, Charlie Woltz, Charlie Perry, and Robert and Wallace Olinger.

Both the Seven Rivers Warriors and the Mescalero Indian Reservation, specifically Indian agent Frederick C. Godfrey, were allied to Chisum’s rivals, the House and the Santa Fe Ring. On August 1876, Chisum allied himself with English cattleman John Tunstall and attorney Alexander McSween to establish the Lincoln County Bank. The establishment angered the House, with some historians describing the move as a "declaration of war". Armed men from the opposing parties began patrolling the open range, especially several precious watering holes. Several Chisum employees, such as Tabb and Charles Rankin, were fired upon while working, allegedly by Chisum’s enemies.

== War ==
The first clash happened on October 1876 at the Wiley Cow Camp, about 80 miles from Chisum’s ranch. A Chisum employee named Yopp got into an argument with two cowboys, one of them being Seven Rivers Warrior member Buck Powell. Yopp grabbed his rifle and fired, but Powell drew his revolver and shot back, hitting him in the mouth. Upon falling to the ground and becoming temporarily insensible, Yopp raised his gun again and opened fire. Powell attempted to counter but his firearm malfunctioned. He then ran up to the downed Yopp, grabbed his opponent's gun and fired, killing him.

On March 10, 1877, Chisum cowboy Jim Highsaw confronted alleged rustler Dick Smith at another cow camp at Loving’s Bend after obtaining evidence on Smith’s rustling activities. Smith went for his gun but Highsaw drew faster and killed him. Highsaw was cleared of charges after his act was deemed self-defense. He then took refuge at Chisum's South Spring Ranch. Settlers from Seven Rivers rode out to the ranch and demanded the surrender of the cowboy. They were met by well-entrenched Chisum employees, and though curses were hurled by both sides, the group eventually retreated.

James Dolan, an associate of the Santa Fe Ring, moved his cow camp from Carizzo to the South end of Chisum's ranch. Chisum's men had reportedly recovered three dozen cattle bearing Chisum's brand in the area. In retaliation, on April 1877, Dolan and his men fired on Chisum's cowboys while they worked. This prompted Chisum to ask assistance from both Captain Purington of Fort Stanton and the Lincoln County Sheriff, William J. Brady, to no avail.

On that same month, Chisum finally rode out with thirty armed men to the home of the Beckwith clan. They surrounded the house from a distance of 500 yards, cut off the water supply, and ordered their surrender. The Beckwiths, meanwhile, opened fire, while two men inside the house, Charles Woltz and Buck Powell, sneaked out to call for help. After a night of continued stand-off, Chisum’s cowboys recommended him to fall back, further stating that they were hired to drive cattle, not to get shot at.

Another incident led to the death of one of Chisum's most reliable cowboy. During a routine cattle drive to Arizona on August 23, 1877, J. M. Franklin was shot and killed by a half-Comanche criminal named Ramon Garcia. He was set upon and captured by foreman George Hogg, who planned to hand him over to Fort Stanton. However, along the way, Garcia's guards shot the criminal dead, allegedly during an escape attempt. Notedly, whiskey from Dowlin's Mill at Tularosa Country was present during the drive.

=== Fight with the Apache ===
During the same time, Chisum was also in conflict with Apaches at the same area, who were said to have stolen from his herd and attacked his men. Chisum's feud with the Apaches began as early as 1867, and by 1872, he claimed to have lost $150,000 worth of cattle from Indian and rustler raids. In early 1875, Chisum and his allies attacked the Apache reservation, killing many and causing others to flee.

In Chisum's conversation with one Robert Casey, he shared about his anger with the Apache. He said, "Bob, you know what I'm going to do? I'm going to steal these Indians out. By God, I'll show them I can steal some too." The Apache continued to raid stocks in and around the Pecos Plains. However, their operations were made difficult due to regular army patrols that desired their return to the reservation, including the presence of the 9th Cavalry who were also stationed at Fort Stanton.

By 1876, several Apache found work in nearby ranches at the Pecos River, renewing hostilities. In the fall of 1877, Chisum’s men went to the reservation again. They got many Indians drunk before rounding up alleged stolen horses. During the retreat, the cowboys shot and killed several Indians near the Agency outpost. The depredation and murder by Chisum's men was investigated and confirmed by Inspector Erwin C. Watkins.

== Aftermath ==
On June, Chisum was put on trial for unlawful assembly, riot and larceny, as well as additional charges from the smaller ranchers. None successfully indicted him and the charges were dropped. Nonetheless, the war ended in a stalemate, and the conflict between Chisum and the smaller ranchers would continue during the Lincoln County War.
