= George Goodell =

Old West lawman and gunfighter

George Goodell (1853–1934) was a gunfighter during the Old West. An associate and a contemporary of famed lawmen Bat and Ed Masterson, Goodell served in law enforcement for multiple cities and communities such as Dodge City, Trinidad, Leavenworth, and Nowata. Although nearly unknown today, historians regard Goodell as one of the most dangerous gunfighters of his day.

== Early life ==
George Goodell was born in 1853 to chairmaker George F. Goodell and his wife Lucy Goodell. He was nicknamed "Red" due to his red hair. As he grew older, he left home and travelled West by train. He became a buffalo hunter in 1872, striking a friendship with the Masterson brothers. By 1878, he married a girl named Addie and had a son who was also named George. His friendship with the Mastersons was so significant that he was recruited to their side during the Royal Gorge War of 1879.

== Lawman career ==
Goodell's first stint as a lawman occurred in Dodge City, Kansas. While guarding two con men named Bill Bell and the Handsome Kid, who were incarcerated by the Mastersons, Goodell fell asleep, allowing the two to escape. Goodell was criticized in the newspapers for his negligence. When the Battle of the Plaza happened on April 16, 1881, Goodell took credit for sending the telegraph that summoned Bat Masterson back to the city, which lead to the infamous gunfight.

Upon hearing that Trinidad, Colorado was going to open their first police force, Goodell travelled to the city and applied. His early foray as a Trinidad lawman resulted in a gunfight in June 1882, when while attempting to assist a woman, someone tried to shoot him but missed. Goodell turned around and shot back, hitting his adversary. At one point, he was bitten by a suspect he had apprehended, taking off a chunk of his finger, which led to him bashing the man's head with his gun "like a pile driver".

=== Goodell-McGraw duel ===
The undersheriff of Trinidad, an Irishman named M.B. McGraw, had a dislike of Goodell. Their rivalry escalated when a journalist of the Trinidad Daily News accused McGraw of accepting a bribe to free a prisoner named Joseph Bryant. McGraw denied the accusation, but came to a realization that Goodell had been feeding information about it to the reporter. McGraw then began posting in the papers himself, insulting Goodell and his wife, as well as challenging him to a fight.

Things went ahead on April 19, 1882. Goodell was standing on a wooden sidewalk in front of Jaffa's Opera House when McGraw approached him. The two went back and forth before McGraw slapped Goodell and attempted to draw his revolver. But Goodell managed to pull out his pistol faster and shot McGraw in the arm, disarming him. He then pumped three more shots at McGraw's abdomen as the lawman fell on the entrance of the establishment, yelling, "For God's sake, hand me my gun!"

Deputy Sheriff H.E. Hardy grappled with Goodell but the latter was too strong. Goodell grabbed McGraw's pistol and emptied it and his own revolver at McGraw. The undersheriff was hit 6–10 times and died two days later. Although the shooting was ruled self-defense, Bat Masterson was forced to relieve Goodell of his badge. Goodell then left Trinidad and travelled to Leavenworth, Kansas.

=== Goodell-Black shootout ===
In 1887, Goodell became a federal deputy marshal under Colonel William C. Jones of the Kansas Judicial District in Leavenworth. On May of that year, he became embroiled with a dispute, and eventual gunfight, with an English pimp named Ben Black. Prior to the incident, Ben Black had been reported by his own wife, Lillie Black, for physical abuse. Black was a known wife-beater who frequently threatened and abused his wife. Rumors of that time also stated that Goodell was having an affair with Lillie Black.

During the afternoon, Goodell received reports that Ben Black had been abusing his wife again while inside a bordello, prompting him to rush to the scene. As he entered the building, he was met by Ben Black, who placed a pistol on his stomach and fired. The bullet hit Goodell's button, before ricocheting and wounding him. On the other hand, Goodell drew his revolver and fired three times, killing Ben Black on the spot. During the investigation, the rumors about his affair with Lillie became public, which resulted in his wife, Addie, divorcing him. Goodell later married another woman named Bertha.

=== Feud with the Fulsoms ===
Goodell then moved to a town named Nowata, located in the Cherokee Nation. Law enforcement of the community was handled by the Fulsom clan, a Cherokee family consisting of John Fulsom, Johnson Fulsom, and Johnson Push Fulsom, with half-brothers William Fulsom and William Hickey serving as deputies. A small population of white settlers had grown in the area, and they requested for a white lawman. Goodell was chosen for the job, becoming Marshall of Nowata as well as Deputy Marshall of the Northern District of the Indian territory.

This did not sit well with the Fulsoms. Animosity brewed between the two, resulting in them threatening to ambush Goodell if he ever crossed them. Goodell ignored the threats and arrested Johnson Fulsom in November 1897 for drunkness. His family broke him out of jail. A month later Goodell tried to arrest William Hickey. The latter fought back, forcing Goodell to shoot, mortally wounding him. When Goodell and others took him to a store to get him treated, Johnson Fulsom arrived and confronted Goodell. Another gunfight ensued and Goodell killed Johnson.

Goodell surrendered afterwards and was sentenced to 20 years in prison. He was taken to a gaol in Columbus, Ohio. After serving three years of his sentence, President Theodore Roosevelt pardoned him in 1902.

== Later life ==
After his release, Goodell drifted into various law enforcement occupations, including guarding prisoners at the Bull Pen in Muskogee, Oklahoma, railroad policeman for the Chicago, Milwaukee & St. Paul Railway, and claimed to have been a bodyguard for President Theodore Roosevelt in his 1904 campaigns. He remarried again to a woman named Ida but divorced again by 1922. Family members claimed that he died on March 23, 1928, in Los Angeles, California.
