= Jim Highsaw =

Old West gunfighter during the Pecos War

Jim Highsaw (1854 - unknown), sometimes spelled Hysaw or Hisaw, was a cowboy and gunfighter in the Old West, known for his participation in the Pecos War of 1876–1877. Although largely unknown today, Highsaw was well known by his contemporaries and has become a basis for a number of fiction.

== Early life ==
James "Jim" Monroe Highsaw was born on 1854 in Eastland County, Texas. By 1860, violence from the ongoing Texas-Indian Wars prompted the Highsaws to move to Erath County. Their name was said to have been the basis for areas such as the High Salt Creek. During that time, former Confederates opposing the Reconstruction began to take over high-ranking government positions in Texas, such as the coveted county sheriffs and other law enforcement positions. These men were dubbed the "Mob" by those who opposed them, including the Highsaws and several other families. In turn, the Mob branded many of them as outlaws. The Highsaw, Witcher, Wylie, and Clary clans then banded together in defiance.

On September 21, 1872, members of the Mob met at a church in Hamilton County. Six men, Jim Highsaw, James Witcher, Adam Witcher, Bill Clary and others, surrounded the church and fired several shots. The people inside shot back, wounding Adam Witcher and forcing the rest to retreat. The two Witchers were apprehended and placed in a jail in Hamilton. The Mob rode into the jail, overpowered the guards, and shot the Witchers dead. One of the brothers, Adams, was shot seven times. The event forced Highsaw to leave Texas to New Mexico.

== First gunfight ==
Highsaw took refuge with a group of Wylies in Pecos River Country. The area was a hotbed of rustling activities and feuds among various ranching clans. When the Wylie family lost a herd of cattle to a group of alleged rustlers, they tasked Highsaw to track down the thieves. Highsaw was well-acquainted with several outlaws in the area, many of whom were fellow Texans on the run from the law. Highsaw and his posse managed to find several of these outlaws herding Wylie livestock.

One of the alleged rustlers suggest they talk about the dispute over a meal, which Highsaw agreed. But as one of the cattle rustlers was about to slaughter a cattle, he suddenly swung his rifle to Highsaw's direction. Highsaw drew his gun and shot the rustler. A shootout then ensued and the herd was reclaimed. A short time later, Highsaw was again tasked to find rustlers in the area, resulting in him shooting dead two of them and dumping their bodies in the Pecos Canyon.

== Shootout with Dick Smith ==
By 1876, crimes and feuds near the Pecos River finally boiled into an armed conflict known as the Pecos War. At that time, Jim Highsaw became an employee of John Chisum and his Jinglebob Ranch. Highsaw's reputation had also grown, becoming famous for being "quick as lightning on the draw"; as well as one of Chisum's most reliable and feared men. Ranchers and settlers opposed to Chisum's dominance in Pecos organized themselves into a group known as Seven Rivers Warriors. During one incident, he and another cowboy Charles Rankin was fired upon by suspected thieves.

One member of the Seven Rivers Warriors, Dick Smith, had been suspected of rustling Chisum's cattle. Highsaw was then tasked by Chisum to investigate the matter. He rode out to Dick Smith's house on March 10, 1877. After getting off his horse, Highsaw called Smith out, requesting the latter to allow him to check his livestock for the presence of any Chisum cattle. Dick Smith refused and the two went back and forth. Finally, Smith had had enough and suddenly went for his pistol. Highsaw, on the other hand, managed to get his pistol out first and shot Smith dead. Highsaw was charged for the murder but the lengthy hearing resulted in the crime being deemed self-defense.

Friends of Dick Smith, including fellow small settlers and members of the Seven Rivers Warriors, demanded justice. Highsaw rode back to the South Spring Ranch as enemies searched for him. Arriving at the ranch, the settlers demanded they hand Highsaw over. They were met with well-entrenched Chisum cowboys who aimed rifles and pistols at them through concealed positions. After hurling more insults, as well as firing a few shots, the vigilante posse was forced to leave. Highsaw then went back to Texas.

== Later life ==
Highsaw dirfted between Texas and New Mexico, finding employment at the XIT Ranch, 89 Brand Ranch, and Mason Ranch. In the 1880s, he served as an undercover informant for one Captain McMurray of the US Army. His last gunfight happened in 1888, when he and his brother, George Highsaw, shot and wounded Sheriff Nowlin of Chaves County, New Mexico when he tried to arrest Jim for unlawful carrying of firearms.

Further indictments on him from various counties in both states, and being pursued by local lawmen and the Texas Rangers, forced Jim Highsaw to hide. Highsaw's last sighting was told by Dick Wylie, whom he alleged visited the Wylie clan again in the 1890s. He was said to have ridden to Northwest Texas before finally disappearing.

== In fiction ==
Jim Highsaw's life became an inspiration for a number of Western fictions, most notably the book series The Long Dusty Trail by Mel Adkins.
