= Frank Loving =

American gambler and gunman

Frank Loving (1860 – April 21, 1882), sometimes called "Cockeyed" Frank Loving, was an Old West gambler and gunman. He was involved in two well-publicized shootouts of the day.

== Early life ==
Loving was born in Jackson County, Missouri, and later moved with his family to Texas, where his father died in the early 1870s. He began making his living as a professional gambler by his late teens, and was often found in saloons. He eventually moved to Dodge City, Kansas. Loving began to frequent the Long Branch Saloon, where he became associated with other well-known gamblers, gunmen, and lawmen, such as Doc Holliday, Bat Masterson, Wyatt Earp, and Charlie Bassett. Loving developed a friendship with a gambler and reputed gunfighter, Levi Richardson. He also became good friends with Long Branch Saloon owner Chalkley Beeson.

== Long Branch Saloon gunfight ==
=== Background ===
Levi Richardson had a tough disposition and was disliked by most of the townspeople, but did get along fairly well with Masterson. He had a reputation as a gunman, despite it being mostly hearsay. In early 1879, Loving quarreled with Richardson. Loving, who was married, claimed that Richardson was making unwanted and disrespectful advances toward his wife, Mattie Loving. In March the two were involved in a fist fight on Front Street. After exchanging punches, Richardson exclaimed "I'll blow the guts out of you, you cockeyed son of a bitch". Loving, not being armed, simply turned and walked away.

=== The gunfight ===
On April 5, 1879, Richardson entered the Long Branch Saloon—specifically looking for Loving—but Loving was not there at that time. Richardson joined a game of poker and waited. About 9:00 pm, Loving walked in and took a seat at a table. Richardson moved over and sat across from him. The two men could be heard arguing. Suddenly, Richardson said loudly, "You wouldn't fight anything you damned son of a bitch", to which Loving said calmly, "Try me and see."

Richardson stood and drew his gun, which prompted Loving to do the same. Both men repeatedly fired their weapons, (Richardson got off five rounds and Loving six). When the shooting stopped, Richardson had been shot in the chest, side, and arm. He was dead. Loving had been grazed on the hand, but was otherwise uninjured.

=== Aftermath ===
No one else in the saloon was injured. City Marshal Bassett and his deputy, responded, having heard the shots. Loving was arrested. On April 7, 1879, a coroner's inquest ruled the shooting was self defense, and Loving was released without charges. The Globe, a local newspaper, wrote: "It seemed strange that Loving was not hit, except for a slight scratch on the hand, as the two men were so close together that their pistols almost touched each other." The shootout was dubbed the Long Branch Saloon Gunfight. Although numerous gunfights took place in that saloon, this is the most well known.

Following the gunfight, Loving left Mattie and his children to travel the country as a gambler. By 1880, he had traveled to Trinidad, Colorado.

== Trinidad gunfight ==
On April 15, 1882, an argument over a game of cards subsequently led to Frank Loving and John Allen drawing their pistols on one another in the center of Main Street. Mutual friends intervened and there was no further violence at that time. Allen had been an acquaintance of Loving from Dodge City.

=== Gunning for each other ===
The next morning, however, Loving entered the Imperial Saloon, where Allen worked, with a pistol in hand. Allen drew and shot at Loving but missed. Loving responded by firing back at Allen, which also missed, but set the saloon patrons scrambling for the door. In the confusion, Loving's gun was knocked from his hand.

Allen, who used another man as a shield, wildly fired his gun several times at Loving as he searched for his revolver. Allen fired a total of three shots at Loving, two while Loving was unarmed and trying to retrieve his dropped pistol. All missed their target. Loving found his pistol and emptied it at Allen as he ran out the rear door into the alley behind the saloon. All his shots missed the fleeing Allen, who immediately took refuge a few doors down in Hammond's Hardware Store. Loving searched the alley for Allen, but was unable to find him.

Trinidad Deputy Marshal James Masterson, a former Dodge City, Kansas Marshal and an acquaintance of Loving, responded to the commotion. He found Loving still in the vicinity of the saloon, and disarmed him. Masterson was unable to locate Allen. When he returned to the saloon, Masterson found that Loving had re-armed himself with two revolvers and had again gone out looking for Allen.

By then, Loving had entered the hardware store to buy ammunition for the guns he had acquired. Allen ambushed and shot Loving from behind. Masterson heard the shot come from the hardware store. Masterson and a local city marshal, Lou Kreeger, found Frank Loving badly wounded. When Loving saw Masterson, he stated, "Jim, I'm shot." Masterson and Kreeger arrested Allen, finding him still hiding in the back of the store. Loving was treated for his wound, but died five days later on April 21, 1882.

=== Aftermath ===
Allen was tried for murder in September, 1882. Allen successfully argued that he acted in self-defense and that he feared for his life. Probably due to Loving having some notoriety as a dangerous man, Allen was acquitted. Although Allen is sometimes referred to in historical references as a "gunman", he was not, as this was his only known armed encounter, which was more a result of him hiding until an opportune moment, rather than an actual gunfight. Allen eventually moved back to Dodge City, where he became a preacher.
