= Luke Short =

American Old West gunfighter, cowboy, and businessman (1854–1893)

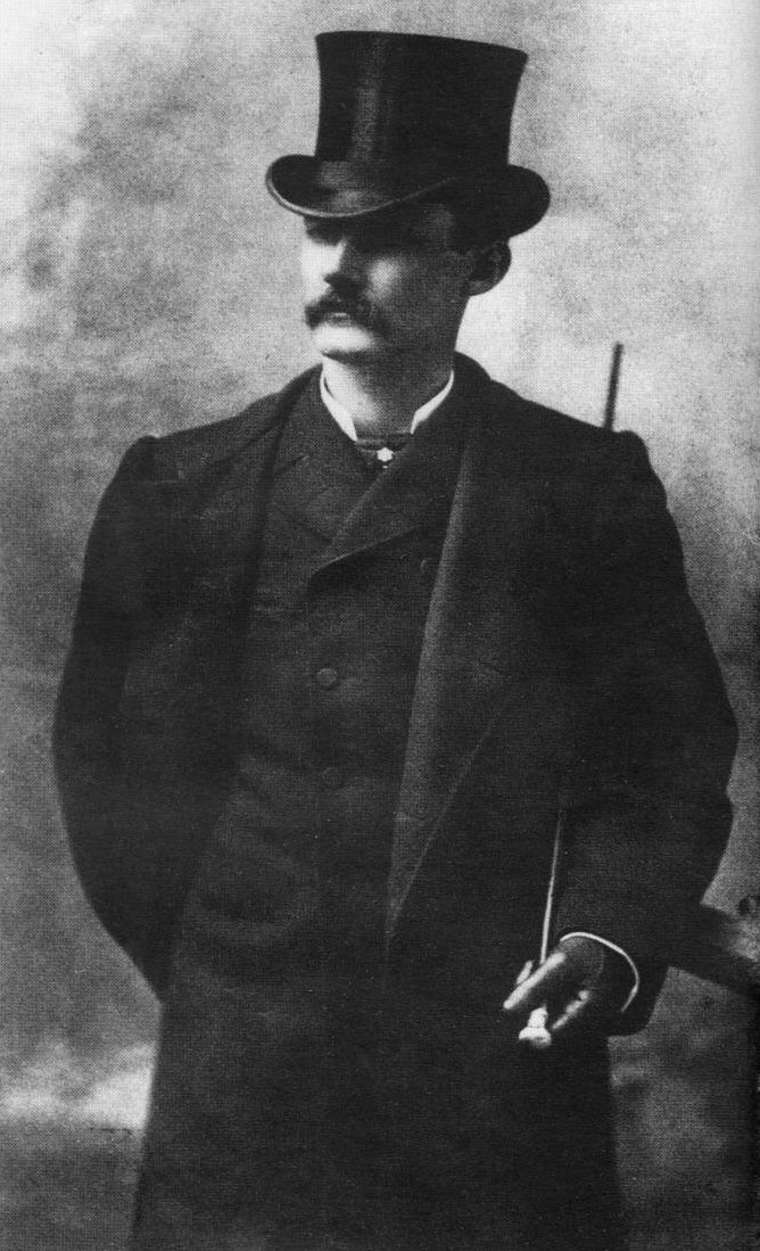
- Born: Luke Lamar Short; January 22, 1854; Polk County, Arkansas, U.S.
- Died: September 8, 1893 (aged 39); Geuda Springs, Kansas, U.S.
- Occupations: Cowboy; gambler; saloon owner; gunfighter; army scout; boxing promoter
- Spouse: Hattie Buck

Luke Lamar Short (January 22, 1854 – September 8, 1893) was an American Old West gunfighter, cowboy, U.S. Army scout, dispatch rider, gambler, boxing promoter, and saloon owner. He survived numerous gunfights, the most famous of which were against Charlie Storms in Tombstone, Arizona Territory, and against Jim Courtright in Fort Worth, Texas. Short had business interests in three of the best-known saloons in the Old West: the Oriental in Tombstone, the Long Branch Saloon in Dodge City, and the White Elephant in Fort Worth.

== Early life ==
Short was born in Polk County, Arkansas, in January 1854. He was the fifth child of Josiah Washington Short (February 2, 1812 – February 8, 1890) and his wife Hetty Brumley (February 2, 1826 – November 30, 1908). Short had nine siblings. The family moved to Montague County, Texas shortly after Short's birth.

In 1862, Luke Short witnessed his father being ambushed and attacked by a group of Comanches in their yard. His father was surrounded by the group and attacked with arrows and lances. Inside the house, Luke helped the elder Short by dragging a large rifle to his brother, who then ran and handed it to his father. At the age of 13, Luke was said to have "carved" the face of a bully when he was still at school, which was the reason why he and his father moved to Fort Worth.

In 1869, at age 15, Short started work as a cowboy, which he continued through 1875, during which he made several trips to the Kansas railheads.

Short was reported by Bat Masterson to have killed six drunken Sioux at various times. Later writers have relied on Masterson's story as truthful and added to it, but no documentation of these killings has been found. Nonetheless, Short had been in over 30 engagements fighting Indians while working for the government, with his first fight occurring in 1869. While working as a scout for General George Crook in 1876, he was stationed in the Black Hills during the Sioux insurrection. While conducting a scouting expedition for the army, a band of 15 Indians ambushed and fired at him with rifles. Short managed to draw his pistols and fired back, killing three of the attackers. Some of the Indians gave chase on horseback, and Short killed two of them before finally reaching safety.

From October 6 to 8, 1878, Short worked as a dispatch courier from Ogallala for Major Thomas Tipton Thornburgh; Short earned $30 (about $1000 in 2025). He then served as a civilian scout for Thornburgh until October 20. He enlisted at Sidney, Nebraska to be paid $100 a month (around $3340 today) but he served only 12 days, for which he was paid $40.

In an interview later in his life, Short told researcher George H. Morrison that he moved to the Black Hills in 1876 and to Ogallala, Nebraska, the next year. Accounts written in Short's later years stated that he was an outlaw during his time in Nebraska. Around this time, Short was said to have traded whiskey with Indians around Camp Robinson, Nebraska. According to his nephew Wayne Short, Luke was arrested by the army. They put him on a train destined for Omaha, but Luke managed to escape the army escort and went to the makeshift mining and cowtown of Denver, Colorado, taking up gambling as a profession. He is said to have killed two men on separate occasions due to altercations during their card games.

== Gambling days ==
Short moved to Leadville, Colorado, in 1879, where he continued gambling. Bat Masterson later wrote that Short seriously wounded a man during a gambling dispute in Leadville. He was accused of swindling Texan John Jones "out of $280 on Three Card Monte" and jailed on October 5 for six days in Kansas City.

=== Gunfight with Charlie Storms ===
Short first met Wyatt Earp, William H. Harris, and Bat Masterson in Tombstone. Based on their previous friendship, Harris had no problem convincing his partners to engage Earp as a faro dealer at their Oriental Saloon in Tombstone. On Friday, February 25, 1881, Short was serving as the lookout, seated next to the dealer at a faro game in the Oriental, when he was involved in what became a well-known gunfight. His opponent was Charlie Storms. Bat Masterson, who was in Tombstone at the time, described what happened in a magazine article he wrote in 1907:

Storms did not know Short, and like the bad man in Leadville, had sized him up as an insignificant-looking fellow, whom he could slap in the face without expecting a return. Both were about to pull their pistols when I jumped between them and grabbed Storms, at the same time requesting Luke not to shoot, a request I knew he would respect if it was possible without endangering his own life too much. I had no trouble in getting Storms out of the house, as he knew me to be his friend ... I was just explaining to Luke that Storms was a very decent sort of man when, lo and behold!, there he stood before us, without saying a word, he took hold of Luke's arm and pulled him off the sidewalk, where he had been standing, at the same time pulling his pistol, a Colt's cut-off, 45 calibre, single action; but like the Leadvillian, he was too slow, although he succeeded in getting his pistol out. Luke stuck the muzzle of his pistol against Storm's heart and pulled the trigger. The bullet tore the heart asunder, and as he was falling, Luke shot him again. Storms was dead when he hit the ground. (Note: The original magazine article on Short, along with Masterson's Human Life articles on other gunfighters, are very rare. The entire series was compiled in book form as The 75th Anniversary Edition of Famous Gun Fighters of the Western Frontier by W.B. (Bat) Masterson. Annotated and Illustrated by Jack DeMattos. Monroe, WA: Weatherford Press, 1982. ISBN 0-9604078-1-2)

Storms' body was taken to the undertaker, where the coroner's jury was convened and testimony was heard. The jury reached a verdict that Storms died from three pistol wounds at the hands of Short, and that Short's actions were justifiable. Short was free to go, as no further legal action was taken.

Five days after Storms died, the Leadville Democrat wrote about the shooting. It said that Storms approached Short and "catching him by the ear", demanded an apology. According to the account, Storms grabbed Short's ear with his left hand and his right hand contained a pistol aimed at Short. Short drew his weapon and shot Storms, who returned fire, but missed. Short then put two more bullets into "the sinking soul of Storms."

== Dodge City ==
Chalk Beeson, co-owner with William Harris of the Long Branch Saloon

Short left Tombstone in early 1881, arriving in Dodge City in April 1881. He remained in Dodge City until the final months of 1883, although he made frequent trips to pursue gambling opportunities. In February 1883, Chalk Beeson sold his interest in the Long Branch Saloon to Short. In March, Harris was nominated to run for mayor of Dodge City. Within a few days, on March 19, a "law and order" group nominated Lawrence E. Deger to run against Harris. Deger defeated Harris by 214 votes to 43 in the election of April 3. All five of the city council candidates running with Deger were also elected.

On April 23, the Dodge City Council posted two ordinances that were immediately approved by Mayor Deger. Ordinance No. 70 was "An Ordinance for the Suppression of Vice and Immorality Within the City of Dodge City." Ordinance No. 71 was "An Ordinance to Define and Punish Vagrancy." Reports of that time recorded an event where Short beat a man with a pistol, which resulted in the man being bedridden and "in despair" for several days. On April 28, three prostitutes employed at the Long Branch were arrested by City Marshal Jack Bridges and policeman Louis C. Hartman. Soon afterward, Short and Hartman exchanged gunfire. Neither man was hurt. Short was quickly arrested and released on a $2,000 bond. His preliminary examination was set for May 2.

=== Forced out of town ===
On April 30, Short was again arrested (along with five other gamblers) and placed in jail. The following day, Short and the five others were escorted to the train depot and given their choice of east- or west-bound trains. Short went east to Kansas City, Missouri, where he looked up Charles E. Bassett at the Marble Hall Saloon. Bassett and Short had both at different times owned an interest in the Long Branch Saloon.

Short and Bassett, along with William F. Petillon, began conceiving a plan to get Short back to Dodge City. Short went to Topeka, the capital, on May 10, where he presented a petition to Governor George W. Glick. Short returned to Kansas City and was joined there by Bat Masterson. Wyatt Earp arrived in Dodge City, along with several gunfighters, on May 31. Short, Earp, and Petillon met in Kinsley, Kansas, on June 3, 1883, and took the afternoon train to Dodge City. Deger issued a proclamation the following day ordering the closing of all gambling places in Dodge City.

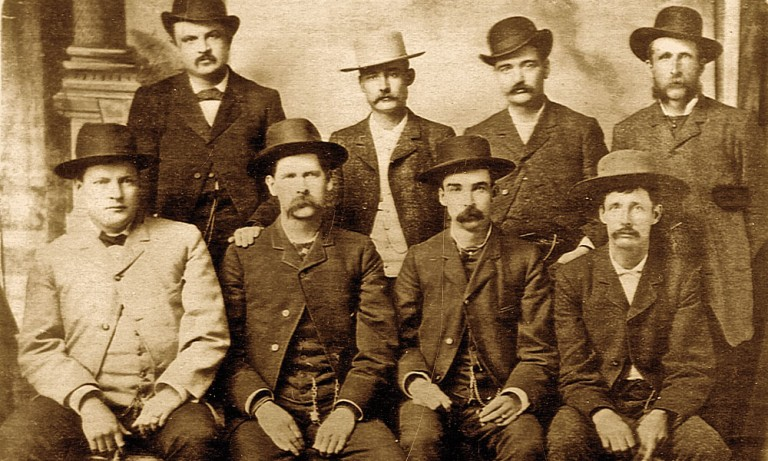
The Dodge City Peace Commission on June 10, 1883: Standing (L-R): William H. Harris, Luke Short, Bat Masterson, William F. Petillon. Seated (L-R): Charlie Bassett, Wyatt Earp, Michael Francis "Frank" McLean, and Cornelius "Neil" Brown, photo by Charles Conkling

=== Dodge City Peace Commission ===
Deger's action came during the cattle season and critics believed this would cause harm by lessening the money spent in the city. Additional pressure to resolve the issue had come from the governor and the Santa Fe Railroad, which did considerable business in the town. The gambling halls, dance halls, and saloons, including the Long Branch, were ordered to be reopened. On June 9, both sides met in a dance hall that opened that night and resolved their differences. The following day, eight men gathered and posed for a widely reproduced Wild West history photo. The group was dubbed the Dodge City Peace Commission. The men in the historic photo were William H. Harris, Luke Short, Bat Masterson, William F. Petillon, Charles E. Bassett, Wyatt Earp, Michael Francis "Frank" McLean, and Cornelius "Neil" Brown. Shortly after the photo was taken, Bat Masterson and Wyatt Earp departed for Colorado.

The Long Branch Saloon, owned by Short, was reopened. On November 19, 1883, Short and Harris sold the Long Branch to Roy Drake and Frank Warren. Short moved to San Antonio, Texas, for a brief time before relocating to Fort Worth.

== Fort Worth ==
=== Partnership in White Elephant Saloon ===
In December 1884, Jacob Christopher "Jake" Johnson, Short, and James A. "Alex" Reddick became the new owners of the Fort Worth White Elephant Saloon. Jake Johnson was one of the wealthiest men in Texas, and his part ownership of the White Elephant was one of many business and real estate enterprises he was involved in. The White Elephant was described in The Fort Worth Daily Gazette of December 12, 1884, as the "pride of the city" and "the largest and most magnificent establishment in the state." The paper detailed the various games of chance, in the "club rooms" of which Short was in charge. That large gambling section also included a dozen billiard tables. Short maintained an office at the White Elephant and often greeted customers. On May 9, 1885, Short, Jake Johnson, M.F. "Frank" McLean, and three others pleaded guilty and were each fined $25 for "gaming."

During this time in Fort Worth, Short performed one of his well-known acts of marksmanship. While dining in a restaurant, the waiter handed him a glass of milk that had a small fly on the surface. Short threw his milk in the air, drew his gun, and shot the fly.

=== Sporting pursuits ===
Short became involved in boxing through Bat Masterson. On June 28, 1885, he was called upon to referee a match fought near Weatherford, Texas, between the 6-foot-2-inch "Kid Bridges" and the 5-foot-8-inch "St. Joe Kid". The decision of referee Short was that the "St. Joe Kid" won on a foul.

Jake Johnson was responsible for making horse racing a major part of Short's sporting agenda. Johnson and two partners opened the Fort Worth Driving Park in January 1885. Short bought a racehorse named Tobe, along with some jockey silks for himself. Short participated in a race held on November 13, 1886, placing last in a field of five.

=== Selling his interest in the White Elephant ===
In 1887, Short's younger brother, Henry Jenkins Short, killed a man named Charles T. Schuyler in San Angelo, Texas, on January 23. San Angelo, 200 miles southwest of Fort Worth, was where Short's parents and other family members lived. Initial reports indicated that Schuyler was shot twice, the bullets entering his back and coming out at the front, either one of which would have been fatal. Henry Short fled to Fort Worth before he could be arrested, to enlist the aid and funds that his brother Luke could provide for his defense. Luke and Henry returned to San Angelo on January 29. Henry voluntarily surrendered to the sheriff and gave a bond for his appearance in the district court.

The money needed to defend Henry Short was to be provided by Luke, who had also provided the money for Henry's bond. In addition, Luke had at the time unrelated legal problems of his own in the Dallas court. The amount that would be needed to handle all of these legal issues was more than Luke had available. To raise the needed funds, Johnson agreed to purchase Luke Short's one-third interest in the White Elephant on February 7, 1887. The press informed the public that Short had no intention of leaving town, "but will continue to call Fort Worth home."

=== Duel with Jim Courtright ===
Timothy Isaiah "Longhair Jim" Courtright was running the T.I.C. Commercial Agency in Fort Worth, which provided "protection" to gambling dens and saloons in return for a portion of their profits. During that time, he was good friends with Short. Things went awry on February 8, 1887, when Jim tried to get Short to utilize his services. But the Dodge City gunfighter told Courtright to "go to Hell," and that he could do anything that was necessary to take care of the White Elephant Saloon. The two quarreled, resulting in Courtright storming out of the saloon. The latter later returned, visibly armed. Short went out and confronted him, and after a hostile conversation, the two ended up drawing their guns. They drew their pistols at close range, and Short fired first, blowing off Courtright's thumb. Courtright attempted the "border shift", a move where a gunfighter switches his gun to his uninjured hand, but he was too slow. Short shot him in the chest, killing him. Both Jake Johnson and Bat Masterson, friends of Short, witnessed the event. Although Short was arrested, the case against him was soon dismissed.

=== Marriage to Hattie Buck ===
Following the resolution of his legal problems, Short traveled to Kansas where he married Hattie Buck (born October 5, 1863) in Oswego, Kansas, on March 15, 1887. Harriet Beatrice Buck was born in Coles County, Illinois, on October 5, 1863. She was the fourth of eight children born between 1858 and 1878. Buck's family later moved to Emporia, Kansas, where her father died a few years prior to her marriage. Short and his wife went to Fort Worth shortly after their wedding, but soon boarded a train "for a brief stay in Hot Springs." A.G. Arkwright later recalled, "Luke Short came there, to the hotel where I was staying, with his wife, the beautiful and accomplished daughter of an Emporia banker, whom he married under romantic circumstances."

=== Horse racing and the Palais Royal ===
"Doing the racing circuit" was a large part of Short's career as a sporting man. His friend Jake Johnson and he, along with their wives, attended the inaugural running of the Futurity Stakes on Labor Day 1888, held in New York at the Sheepshead Bay Race Track on Coney Island. By October 1888, Short and Johnson were back in Fort Worth. Short was no longer connected with the White Elephant, and Johnson had decided to open what the local paper headlined as a "super resort" called the Palais Royal, which was designed to rival the White Elephant.

== Chicago ==
=== Boxing promoter ===
From 1889 to 1893, Short spent part of each year in Chicago. He and his wife Hattie often went there during the summer to attend Thoroughbred horse races. By the end of 1889, Short had become well known in Chicago. The Daily Inter Ocean reported that Short, "who is numbered as one of the prominent figures of the Richburg battle" had cabled Charles E. "Parson" Davies offering $20,000 to have John L. Sullivan defend his boxing title in a championship fight at Fort Worth.

On February 8, 1890, Short's father, Josiah Washington Short, died in San Angelo, Texas, "at the ripe age of 78 years", although Short only learned of his father's death after the burial. Soon thereafter, Short's youngest brother, William B. Short, was killed at the age of 22 "by a herd of stampeding cattle on the Tankersly ranch."

=== Robbed ===
In 1890, Short, Johnson, and a gambler named Charles M. Wright, along with other sporting men, were partners in some Memphis faro games. The partners won significant amounts of cash, reported as "thousands of dollars", which were entrusted to Wright. He was designated as the banker for the group and was supposed to place the winnings in a hotel safe where the group stayed. For unknown reasons, Wright decided to keep the cash in his hotel room and was robbed of the entire amount. Wright wanted Short and his other partners to bear an equal share of the loss, but they refused and turned the matter over to the authorities, who decided against Wright. According to a later report, Wright was never satisfied with that decision, and had "hard words" with several of his ex-partners on the subject, particularly with Short."

=== The last gunfight ===
After the robbery earlier in 1890, tensions between Short and Wright continued to escalate. Their feud culminated in a gunfight in Fort Worth on December 23, 1890. The gunfight took place at the Bank Saloon on Main Street which was owned by Wright. In testimonies presented by eyewitnesses, Wright was conducting gambling in his house and Short went there to close it down. After Short evicted all the patrons at gunpoint, Wright ambushed him with a shotgun, wounding Short in the left hip and leg, as well as injuring his left hand. Short retaliated by drawing his pistol and shooting Wright in the right wrist, disarming him. Both men then separated ways, with Short going out to meet his friends, while Wright stayed in the building.

In describing Short's leg wound, the local paper said, "the full charge of buckshot passed through the flesh, making a tunnel, the muscles on the outside were torn out." The wound on his left hand resulted in his thumb being "taken off at the joint." Reports of the shooting, along with updates on Short's condition, were published in newspapers in several states. A paper in Hutchinson, Kansas, observed, "his wounds are enough to kill a common man, but Luke may get well." Short remained bedridden for months. In 1891, a Chicago newspaper published a lengthy profile of Short. When discussing the gunfight with Wright, the paper reported: "It was supposed at the time that Short was fatally wounded, and his recovery was wholly due to the careful nursing of his wife, who for three months hardly left his bedside." Both Short and Wright were indicted and charged with assault with intent to murder and made bonds in the sum of $1,000. The trial date was changed more than once, and a final decision was not reached until March 1, 1892.

=== Nearly killing a man by mistake in Chicago ===
By May 21, 1891, Short had sufficiently recovered from his wounds, and travelled to Chicago with Johnson, accompanied by his wife. The trip coincided with the start of the racing season, and Johnson and Short both owned a string of horses that would be running at Washington Park Race Track in Chicago.

During this trip, Short was accosted in the lobby of the Leland Hotel by a drunken attorney named James J. Singleton in late October 1891. According to the report, Short did not have his pistol but managed to give Singleton a few kicks, knocking him down. Short then picked him up and pushed him out "into the frosty night air." Short went upstairs for his gun in case Singleton decided to return. While Short was gone, an actor named William F. Hoey (1854–1897) walked into the hotel lobby. The actor, coincidentally, closely resembled the lawyer Short had just kicked out. Short saw Hoey, and believing him to be Singleton, charged at him with his pistol. A hotel clerk named Ed Kennedy jumped between the two men and deescalated the situation. When Short realized his mistake, he apologized to the actor and treated him to drinks and a late supper.

=== Guilty of assault ===
On March 1, 1892, a decision was reached in the State v Luke Short. Short was found guilty of aggravated assault against Charles Wright, and a fine of $150 was assessed against him.

== Final days ==
=== Bright's disease ===
By the start of 1893, Short's health had begun to deteriorate. Doctors determined that he was suffering from one of the kidney diseases that then went under the now-obsolete classification of Bright's disease. These diseases are described in modern medicine as acute or chronic nephritis. Edema, then called "dropsy", would have contributed to a slight puffiness in his face, as well as the accumulation of fluids in his lower legs that would have made standing difficult for prolonged periods of time for Short. Short was in Fort Worth when a Kansas newspaper reported that he was "lying at death's door." Short and a number of friends, and with Hattie beside him, took the north-bound Santa Fe train for Geuda Springs, Kansas. It was believed a change of climate and the supposedly medicinal qualities of the waters, would "prolong his life." The move did not have the desired effect.

=== Death ===
Short died at the Gilbert House in Geuda Springs on September 8, 1893. The local paper reported: "Luke Short died at the Gilbert this morning of dropsy." Just two days before Short's death, while Hattie sat at his bedside in Kansas, word arrived that her mother had died in Fort Worth. A Dodge City newspaper belatedly printed a dispatch from Fort Worth that stated, "two days ago, his mother-in-law died and the two funerals will take place here at the same time." Hattie found herself a widow at 29 years old. Short was 39 at the time of his death.

Short's funeral took place in Fort Worth on September 10, 1893. Carriages in a line more than a mile long followed Short's body to Oakwood Cemetery in Fort Worth. Short had purchased a gravestone shortly before his death. It is a plain, upright marker simply inscribed: L. L. SHORT 1854 – 1893.

== In popular culture ==
On February 22, 1955, Short was played by actor Wally Cassell in an episode of the syndicated Western TV series Stories of the Century. The part of Jim Courtright was portrayed by actor Robert Knapp (1924–2001).

On January 5, 1960, Bob Steele played Short in the episode "The Terrified Town" on the CBS Western television series The Texan, starring Rory Calhoun.
