= Bob Steele =

Bob Steele may refer to:

- Bob Steele (broadcaster) (1911–2002), American radio personality in Hartford, Connecticut
- Bob Steele (actor) (1907–1988), American actor in Westerns
- Bob Steele (baseball) (1894–1962), Major League Baseball pitcher
- Bob Steele (cricketer) (1901–1985), Australian cricketer
- Bob Steele (swim coach) (born 1939), American swim coach
- Bob Steele (hurdler) (born 1945), American hurdler, 1966 400 m hurdles NCAA champion for the Michigan State Spartans track and field team

== See also ==
- Bobby Steele (born 1956), American musician
- Robert Steele (disambiguation)
- Robert K. Steel (born 1951), businessman
