= Long Branch Saloon =

Saloon in Dodge City

Coordinates: 37.751°N 100.022°W

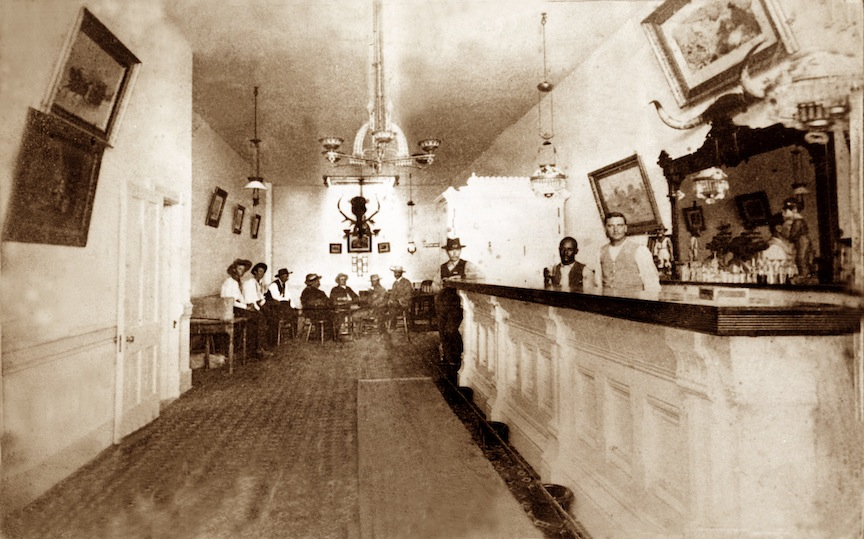
- Interior of the Historic Long Branch Saloon

General information
- Status: Replica
- Architectural style: False-front
- Location: Dodge City, Kansas, United States
- Opened: c. 1874
- Destroyed: 1885
- Owner: Chalk Beeson, William H. Harris, Luke Short, and others.

The Long Branch Saloon was a well-known saloon in Dodge City, Kansas, from about 1874 to 1885. It had several owners, most notably Chalk Beeson and gunfighter Luke Short. The establishment provided gambling and live entertainment, including Beeson's five-person orchestra. It was the scene of several altercations, shoot-outs, gunfights, and standoffs often associated with cattle towns in the American wild west. Most famous was the 1879 Long Branch Saloon Gunfight, in which Frank Loving killed Levi Richardson.

== Origins ==
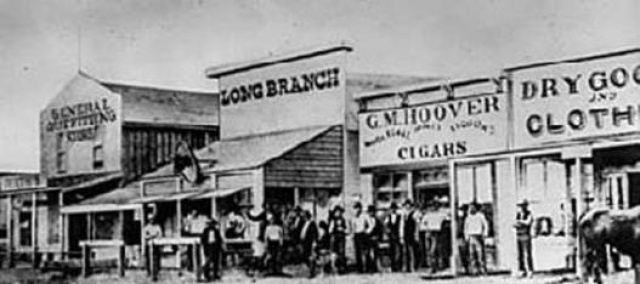
The Long Branch Saloon in Dodge City, Kansas, 1874

The saloon was built as the result of a wager between cowboys and soldiers playing ball. Bets were placed and if the cowboys beat the soldiers, the soldiers agreed to provide building materials to construct a saloon.

Chalkley Beeson, a wealthy farmer and rancher, and William Harris bought the saloon in 1878. Harris named it after his hometown of Long Branch, New Jersey. It was a plain storefront bar with little ornamentation, typical for frontier saloons of the time. The saloon prospered until the railroad replaced the cattle drive. The establishment burned down in 1885 and was never rebuilt.

== Entertainment ==
Beeson was a talented musician and led a five-piece orchestra that played at the establishment nightly. The Long Branch served milk, tea, lemonade, sarsaparilla, and many types of alcohol, including champagne and beer. Anheuser-Busch was the original beer served at the Long Branch. Drinks were kept cold in the winter with ice hauled up from the river; in the summer, ice was shipped by train from the mountains of Colorado. Gambling ranged from five cent chuck-a-luck to thousand-dollar poker.

Chalkley "Chalk" Beeson with William Harris, co-owners of the Long Branch Saloon

== Notable patrons and events ==
The saloon hosted many Old West characters including Clay Allison, Wyatt Earp, Doc Holliday, Frank Loving, Mysterious Dave, Charlie Bassett (town marshal), and brothers Ed, James, and Bat Masterson.

The saloon was the site of a gunfight on April 5, 1879, between Frank Loving and Levi Richardson. Loving accused Richardson of making disrespectful advances towards his wife, and the two got into an argument that turned into a gunfight across a table. Loving was grazed on the hand by one bullet; Richardson was shot three times and died. Town Marshal Bassett arrested Loving, but on April 7, a coroner′s inquest ruled that Loving had acted in self-defense and he was released without charges.

Professional gambler and gunfighter Short's purchase of a partial interest in the saloon in 1883 was credited as one of the causes of the bloodless Dodge City War.

== In popular culture ==
A saloon of the same name was featured in the long-running radio and television drama, Gunsmoke. A new establishment named the Long Branch Saloon, largely based on the Gunsmoke series, was built as part of the modern Boot Hill Museum entertainment and exhibit complex in Dodge City. The exterior was modeled on period photographs of the original building, while the interior is consistent with period saloons of the era. It is furnished with an 1881 bar and two Golden Eagles on top of the back bar that were once owned by Beeson.
