= Jim Courtright (gunman) =

American lawman, outlaw and gunfighter

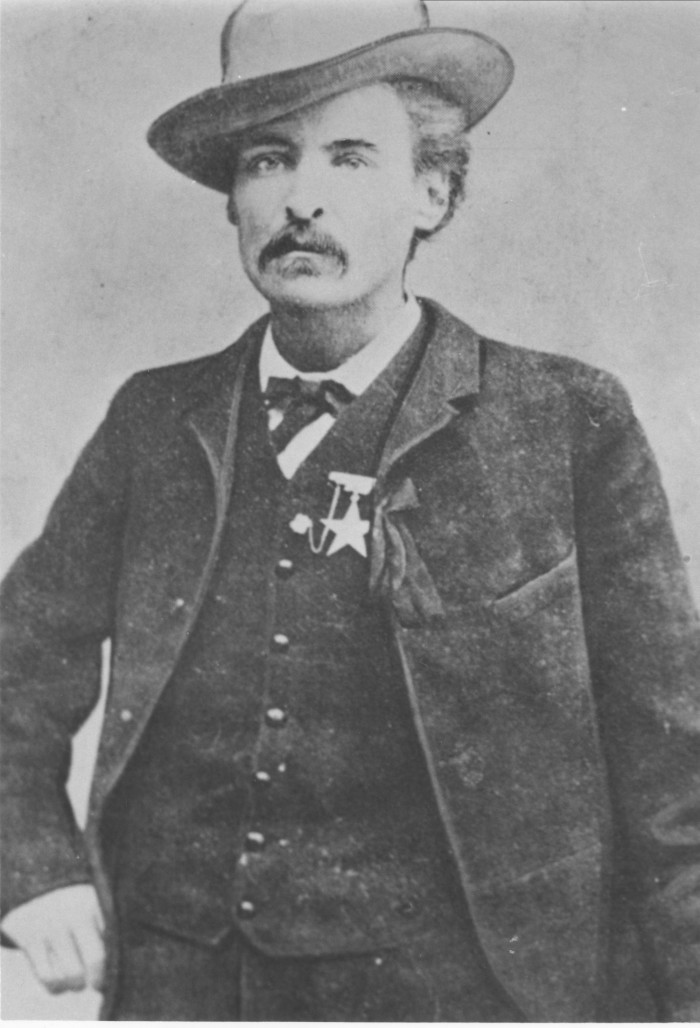
- Jim Courtright
- Born: c. 1845; Sangamon County, Illinois, US
- Died: February 8, 1887 (aged 42); Fort Worth, Texas, US
- Cause of death: Gunshot wound
- Occupations: Lawman, businessman, jailer, city marshal, deputy sheriff, deputy U.S. Marshal, private detective, Gambler, and Gunfighter
- Spouse: Sarah Weeks

Timothy Isaiah Courtright (c. 1845 – February 8, 1887), also known as "Longhair Jim" or "Big Jim" Courtright, was an American Deputy Sheriff in Fort Worth, Texas from 1876 to 1879. In 1887, he was killed in a shootout with gambler and gunfighter Luke Short. Before his death, people feared Courtright's reputation as a gunman, and he reduced Ft. Worth's murder rate by more than half, while reportedly extracting protection money from town business owners.

== Early life ==
Courtright was born in Sangamon County, Illinois, in the spring of 1845, the son of Daniel Courtright. He had four older sisters and one younger brother. He was reported to have practiced shooting frequently. Allegedly, he lied about his age and enlisted in the Union Army during the American Civil War.. He served under General John A. Logan for whom he once took a bullet and thus earned Logan's admiration. He was rootless and traveled around often until he finally settled in Fort Worth in north Texas. While in Fort Worth, Courtright was at various times a jailer, city marshal, deputy sheriff, deputy U.S. Marshal, hired killer, private detective, and racketeer. During his travels, Courtright had developed a reputation as being fast with a gun.

He married Sarah Weeks and taught her how to shoot. They held shooting exhibitions for which they charged admission, and later performed as part of Buffalo Bill's Wild West Show.

== Lawman career ==
Courtright and his wife arrived in Ft. Worth in 1876. He ran for office as the first elected city marshal against four other men, and won by three votes. He liked to wear his hair long and wore two revolvers with their butts facing forward. He became known for his long hair and his reputation for using his badge as a convenience.

As marshal, he was in charge of keeping the peace in the notorious "Hells Half Acre" (the town's red-light district). At that time, Fort Worth was a very dangerous place, with altercations between unruly drunks and lawmen being commonplace. Few people dared to cross him, and he killed several who did. On August 25, 1877, Deputy Marshal Columbus Fitzgerald was shot and killed while attempting to break up a street fight. Courtright shot and killed the suspect that same night. During his tenure as Ft. Worth Marshal, it was reported that he killed at least four other men during altercations and shootouts.

It was generally believed that he murdered several unwilling business owners who would not pay into his protection racket. Most met his demand to avoid the risk of becoming the target of his anger and gun. Some who declined were killed, and those who survived usually made the payments demanded.

=== Life after Ft. Worth ===
He served as Ft. Worth's Marshal until 1879, when he lost his third election. He left his family behind, he moved to New Mexico and obtained appointment as the Marshal of Lake Valley, and after that as a hired guard for a mining operation. Sometime later, while working as a ranch foreman, he and his friend Jim McIntire shot and killed two squatters who had refused to leave the ranch.

=== American Valley murders ===
In 1883, his former Civil War commander John A. Logan was interested in purchasing the American Valley Cattle Company in New Mexico. The company controlled a vast tract of land about 66 by 72 miles (106 by 116 km) wide. Maintaining that he was concerned about ongoing cattle rustling that was decimating herds, U.S. Marshal A. L. Morisson invited his deputies Courtright and Jim McIntire to help secure the land.

But the current owner John P. Casey and his partners W. C. Moore and Henry M. Atkison had bigger ambitions: they wanted ownership of an additional 3,400 acres (1,400 ha) acres with water rights that would allow them to gain control of an additional 3,000,000 acres (1,200,000 ha) of quality grazing land. They had already forced about 90 residents of the small community of Rito off their land. But Alexis Grossetete and Robert Elsinger, partners in a ranch at Gallo Springs were resistant to Moore's threats. They had claimed their land under preemption rights that guaranteed settlers the right to file a patent on unsurveyed land. Both had brought their families onto the land and made it evident they intended to stay. Casey accused them of being squatters and was determined to evict them.

Casey's partner W. C. Moore had a dark past. He was hired by D. T. Beals and W. H. Bates, owners of the LX Ranch in the Texas Panhandle, to manage a large herd. He started in 1877 but during 1881 they discovered that he was siphoning off a good portion of the stock for his own herd and they fired him. Moore sold his Adobe Walls Ranch for $75,000 (or about $2,500,000 in today's dollars) and used $25,000 of the proceeds to buy a one-third interest in Casey's American Valley Cattle Company. Courtright may have initially believed he was only hired to pursue cattle rustlers. He was told by Moore that they were pursuing a former employee of Casey's named D. L. Gilmore near Socorro, New Mexico. Moore led the posse directly to the ranch headquarters in American Valley and the next day they looked for Gilmore's cowboys, ending the day at a line cabin about 8 miles (13 km) from Grossetete's and Elsinger's homes. The next day Moore took five of the posse and rode towards their homes. Moore told the party that their job was to get rid of the two "squatters." He said all six would fire into their bodies so all six would be equally guilty. They found the men, took their weapons, marched them to a narrow ravine, and killed them both.

Daniel H. McAllister, a Deacon in the Church of Jesus Christ of Latter-day Saints, had been until a few days before the manager of Casey's ranch. When he learned of the murders, he informed the authorities, who promptly called for Moore and his fellow posse members' arrest. Courtright and McIntire initially acted as lawmen and arrested the others who had taken part in the murders, but when the grand jury convened, they learned that the two men had also taken part. Moore escaped arrest, and before Courtright and McIntire could be apprehended, they took off for Mexico on horseback, finally ending up on June 1 in El Paso, Texas, where they found safety among a number of former Texas Rangers who knew them both. Courtright sent for his wife and children who had been in Los Angeles. McIntire also summoned his wife and the two families headed to Ft. Worth, where they successfully fought extradition to New Mexico, claiming the two men were "Mexicans" and they had been performing their duties as lawmen.

== Forms detective agency ==
Secure in Ft. Worth, in 1884 Courtright tried once again to form a detective agency. In New Mexico, two men were tried and acquitted of the murders, and authorities renewed their effort to bring Courtright to justice.

== Courtright vs Short ==
Luke Short was a gunfighter, gambler and bar owner who had drifted down to Fort Worth from Dodge City, Kansas. While in Dodge City, Short had dabbled in gambling, and became friends with several other noted Old West figures, such as Bat Masterson, Jim Masterson and Wyatt Earp, who had also become friends with Courtright. In Fort Worth, he managed the White Elephant, a saloon/gambling house.

Marshal Courtright was running a protection racket at the time, and needed to make an example of Short, who also had a sizable reputation as a gunfighter mostly due to an 1881 gunfight with gunslinger Charlie Storms at the Oriental Saloon in Tombstone, Arizona. Most historians believe that Courtright offered protection to the White Elephant and that Short informed him that he did not need his protection.

On February 8, 1887, at about 8:00 p.m., Courtright called out Luke Short, carrying a pair of pistols, and challenging him to come out of the White Elephant, but a friend Jake Johnson managed to calm him down and told him that they should talk about the affair instead. In Short's own accounts, both men walked up the street one block, until they were in front of bar and brothel owner Ella Blackwell's Shooting Gallery, the two men facing one another three to four feet apart. Words were passed, and evidently Courtright, who had been drinking considerably, had made some indication about Short having a gun. Short assured Courtright he was not armed, although he was. Courtright then said loudly "Don't you pull a gun on me." With that statement, Courtright drew his pistol and in that second Short produced his pistol and fired one shot, which took off Courtright's thumb on his shooting hand. As Courtright attempted to shift his pistol to his other hand, Short fired four more shots in quick succession. Courtright fell backward and died shortly thereafter.

The showdown was also witnessed by fellow gunfighter Bat Masterson, who was with Luke Short at that time. In 1907 Masterson published his own, more neutral account of the events that unfold, in which he stated that it was Jim Courtright, who called for Luke Short to meet him in the street for a confrontation, while carrying a "brace of pistols" of his own. Masterson described what followed:

No time was wasted in the exchange of words once the men faced each other. Both drew their pistols at the same time, but, as usual, Short's spoke first and a bullet from a Colt's 45-calibre pistol went crashing through Courtright's body. The shock caused him to reel backward; then he got another and still another, and by the time his lifeless form had reached the floor, Luke had succeeded in shooting him five times.

Courtright was shot three times: Once in the thumb; once in the right shoulder, and once in the heart.

Investigations on the gunfight concluded that while it was Courtright who went for his pistol first, it was Short who ultimately outdrew and killed him. Courtright's inability to fire off a shot was due to a number of possible scenarios; one was that his pistol got caught on his watch chain for a second as he drew it, and another was that his pistol broke when one of Short's bullets struck it and his thumb. Another is that Courtright's .45 Colt in his right hand had jammed because a bullet prevented the gun chamber from moving.

== Aftermath and legacy ==
Short was tried for the shooting, but it was ruled justified self defense, and the charges were dismissed. The gunfight gained notoriety due to the reputation of both men. Unfortunately for Courtright, that fame was posthumous.

== In popular culture ==
In 1955, the half-hour syndicated television series Stories of the Century, starring Jim Davis as railroad detective Matt Clark, aired the Jim Courtright story, with Robert Knapp in the title role and Wally Cassell as Luke Short.

In 1958, Karl Swenson was cast in an historically inaccurate portrayal of Courtright on the ABC/Warner Brothers western series, Colt .45, starring Wayde Preston. In the episode entitled "Long Odds", Swenson plays a grandfather visiting his 10-year-old grandson Billy, played by child actor Paul Engle. Billy has told his friends of his grandfather's prowess with a gun, but the elderly Courtright now shuns a confrontation with the gunfighter Cherry Lane, played by Robert J. Wilke, amid accusations of cowardice. The real Courtright was dead at thirty-nine and likely had no grandchildren. In the Colt .45 episode, Swenson was fifty when he portrayed Courtright.

In 2021, the character of Jim Courtright was played by actor Billy Bob Thornton in the television series 1883, a spin-off of Taylor Sheridan's hit show Yellowstone.

Police appointments
Preceded by New office	City Marshal of Fort Worth, Texas; 1876–1879	Succeeded by Sam Farmer
