= Robert Steele =

Robert Steele or Rob Steele may refer to:

- Robert Steele, (1745–1830) Scottish shipbuilder, founder of Robert Steele & Company, 1815
- Robert Steele (drum major) (1760–1833), American Revolutionary War drummer and drum major
- Robert Williamson Steele (1820–1901), governor of the extralegal Jefferson Territory, U.S.A, 1859–1861
- Robert Steele (medievalist) (1860–1944), editor of the works of Roger Bacon
- Robert Steele (sailor) (1893-1969), British Olympic sailor
- Robert Cecil Steele (1903–1976), Canadian politician in the Legislative Assembly of British Columbia
- Lanny Steele (Robert L. Steele, 1933–1994), American jazz pianist
- Robert H. Steele (born 1938), U.S. Representative for Connecticut, 1970–1975
- Robert David Steele (1952–2021), former CIA officer and conspiracy theorist
- Robert Steele (American football) (born 1956), former NFL wide receiver
- Robert Steele (Illinois politician) (1961–2017), commissioner of Cook County, Illinois
- Robert Steele (MP) (c. 1757–1817), British politician and judge
- Rob Steele (actor) (died 2022), Australian actor, in Muriel's Wedding (1994)
- Rob Steele, Republican candidate in the 2010 United States House of Representatives elections in Michigan#District 15
- Rob Steele (businessman) (born 1961), Canadian businessman

== See also ==
- Bob Steele (disambiguation)
- Bobby Steele (born 1956), American musician
- Robert Steel (disambiguation)
