= Fast draw =

Ability to quickly draw a handgun and accurately fire it at a target

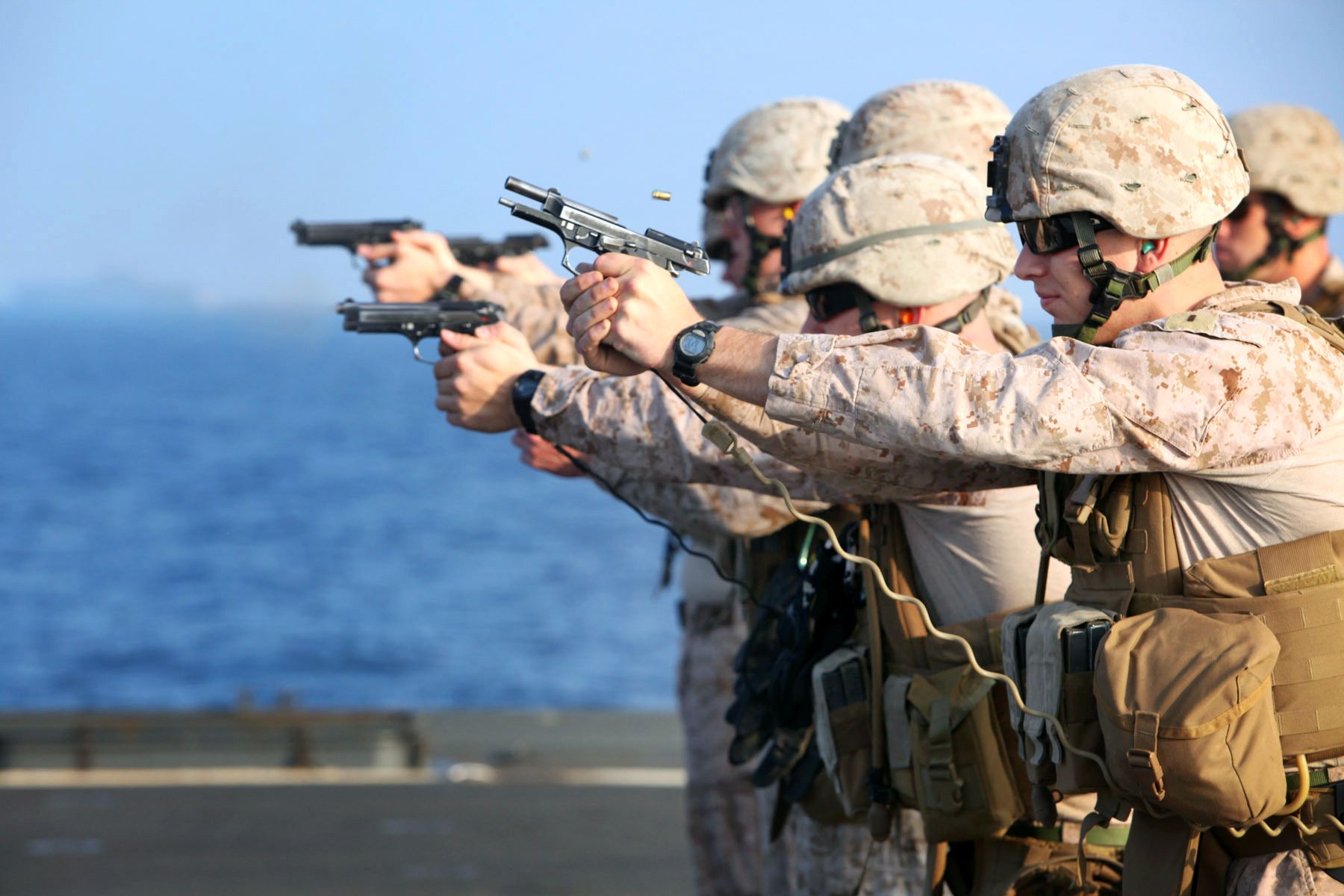
Military marksmanship training with Beretta M9 pistols

Fast draw, or quick draw, is the ability to quickly draw a handgun and accurately fire it upon a target in the process. This skill was made popular by romanticized depictions of gunslingers in the Western genre, which in turn were inspired by famous historical gunfights in the American Old West.

In modern times, fast draw can be seen both in sports and in military practices. The World Fast Draw Association (WFDA) is the international sanctioning body of the sport of fast draw. Unlike cowboy action shooting, fast draw is shot with special blanks or wax bullets. While some competitions are strictly against the clock, with the fastest time winning, many are set up as head-to-head single- or double-elimination matches.

== History ==
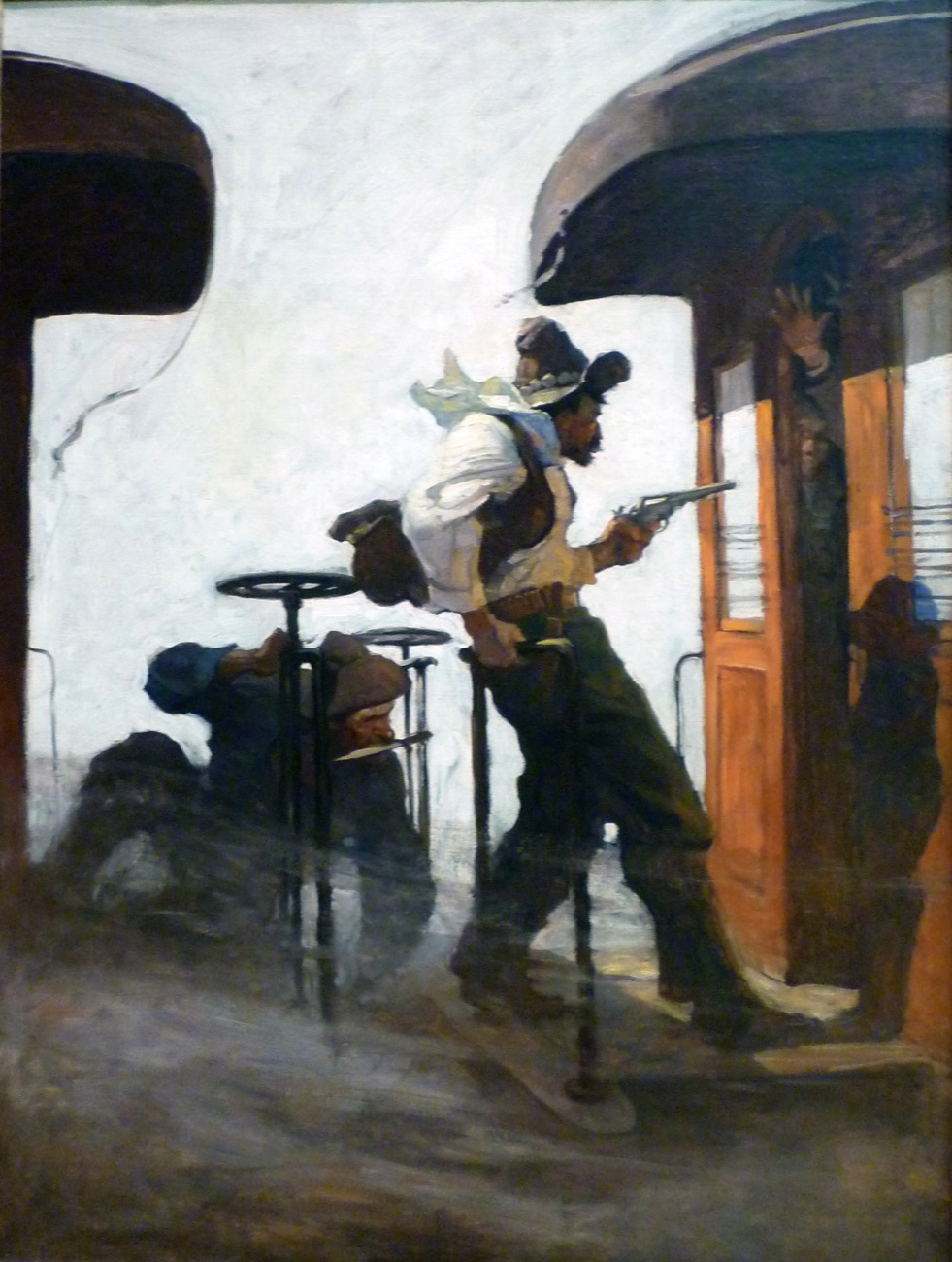
1912 painting of a gunfighter drawing and aiming his revolver.

The object of fast draw as a combative skill is to quickly draw one's pistol and fire with the most accuracy. The skill has been inspired by accounts of duels and gunfights which incorporated it during the Wild West. Although unlike the depiction seen in Westerns, fast draw duels at that time were performed with the traditional dueling stance. Typically, historical Western duels were a crude form of the Southern duel, which followed a formal code, a highly formalized means of solving disputes between gentlemen with swords or guns that had its origins in European chivalry. During the Old West, the term "fast on the draw" or "quick on the draw" did not necessarily mean a person is swift on drawing a pistol, it actually meant that a person is aggressive and would draw his weapon at even the slightest provocation.

Though many gunfighters were remembered to be dangerous with a pistol during the American frontier, only a few known historical individuals have been noted by historians as "fast", such as Wild Bill Hickok, Doc Holliday, John Wesley Hardin, and Billy the Kid. There had been several one-on-one pistol duels in the Old West where the quick draw was utilized, such as the Hickok–Tutt Shootout, Short–Courtright Duel, Long Branch Saloon Gunfight, Highsaw–Smith Shootout, Goodell–McGraw Shootout, Bull–Peel Duel, and the Canton–Dunn Gunfight. Gunfighters Jim Leavy and Tom Carberry became infamous for participating in at least two quick draw duels in their lifetimes. Other gunfights where the fast draw was witnessed included the Gunfight at the OK Corral, El Paso Gunfight, and the Jonathan R. Davis Shootout.

While the ability to draw a firearm quickly was a popular skill during the American frontier, modern fast draw is inspired more by gun duels in western films than historical gunfights. Most gunfights that occurred in the Old West were more spontaneous due to either alcohol consumption or heated squabbles. Duels, while also fought to uphold honor, were usually not formalized and sometimes were due to the heat of the moment. In these circumstances, the one who can draw, fire and hit his opponent first was usually the winner, but accuracy and calmness were also, and sometimes more, favored by actual gunmen in the era.

=== Holsters ===
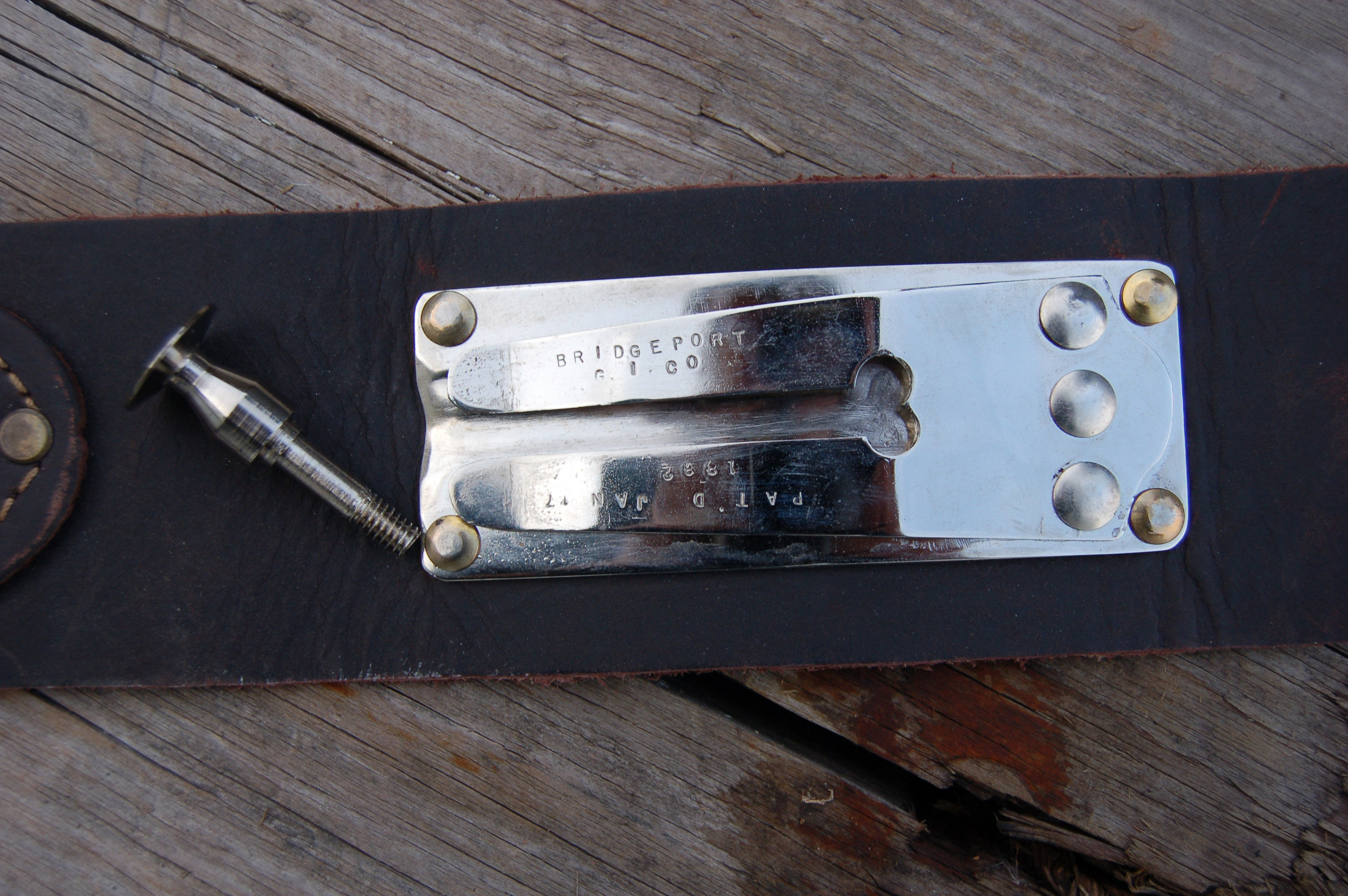
The Bridgeport rig holster allows the user to aim and shoot the weapon when still attached to the pistol belt.

In Western movies, the characters' gun belts are often worn low on the hip and outer thigh, with the holster cut away around the pistol's trigger and grip for a smooth, fast draw. This type of holster is a Hollywood anachronism. Fast-draw artists can be distinguished from other movie cowboys because their guns will often be tied to their thigh. Long before holsters were steel-lined, they were soft and supple for comfortable all-day wear. A gunfighter would use tie-downs to keep his pistol from catching on the holster while drawing. Most of the time, gunfighters would just hide their pistols in their pockets or tuck them in their belts, which was faster and more practical. Other gunfighters would use Bridgeport rigs that gave a faster and easier draw.

== Sport ==
Fast draw is one of the fastest sports in the world. Every time is measured under one second, from the signal to draw to when the timer is stopped. The current World Fast Draw Association (WFDA) record for Open Class Fast Draw in an event called Standing Balloons is .208 seconds - and that includes the time it takes to react, draw, fire and pop a balloon target at eight feet away. A world class competitor can draw and fire a shot in under half a second. Given that the average human reaction time is around 0.2 to 0.25 seconds, the round is over before most people can react. The reaction times of the best fast draw shooters is 0.145 seconds, which means that the gun is cocked, drawn, aimed (from the hip), and fired in just over 0.06 seconds. To establish a World Fast Draw Association record, a second shot must be fired in the same competition that is no more than 0.30 seconds slower than the first; this is intended to prevent a shot that anticipates the start signal from setting a record. In competitions where two rounds must be fired, at separate targets, less than 0.10 seconds separate the shots.

In Open Class, or "traditional" fast draw competition, shooters must start with the gun holstered, and their hands not touching the gun, as opposed to the newer sport of Cowboy Fast Draw, where the competitors start with their hand on the gun. A signal, usually both audible and visible, signals the shooter to fire. A timer is started when the signal is given. The shooter fires at either a metal plate (for wax bullets) or a balloon (for blanks). The timer is rigged to stop on the sound of the wax bullet hitting the plate, or the balloon popping. Different types of matches use one or more targets, and the shooter can fire from a standing position, or while walking towards or backing away from the target(s).

The exhibition shooter Bob Munden, proclaimed by the Guinness Book of World Records as “the fastest man with a gun who ever lived", could draw, fire, break a balloon target with a blank using a standard weight single-action revolver and return his gun to his holster faster than the blink of an eye. Munden was recorded shooting .16 of a second, in an event called Walk and Draw Level.

== In the military ==
Both the tales from Old West gunfights, and the quick draw sports derived from them, have influenced pistol drills and techniques in the American military and law enforcement. Draw speed is essential in a deadly force situation and soldiers and police are trained to be able to draw their sidearm and fire with speed and accuracy. That being said, practical use of the quick draw diverged from simply focusing on speed, balancing it with precision, stressing threat assessment, and judgment as well.

=== Accidents ===
In June 2011, a soldier named Sgt. Brent McBride played a game of quick draw with his fellow soldier and roommate, Sgt. Matthew Gallagher. The incident happened in their small trailer-like room in Al Kut, Iraq. During the game, McBride drew his pistol and shot Gallagher in the head at close range. McBride pleaded guilty to involuntary manslaughter at a Fort Hood, Texas, court martial in March 2012.

== See also ==
- Glossary of firearms terms
- Gunspinning – Twirling a handgun using the trigger guard
- Iaido – Japanese martial art
- Iaijutsu – Combative quick-draw sword technique
