= Robert Steel =

Robert Steel may refer to:

- Robert Steel (minister) (1827–1893), Scottish/Australian Presbyterian minister
- Robert Steel (chess player) (1839-1903), English chess player and businessman
- Bobby Steel (1888–1972), Scottish footballer
- Robert Walter Steel (1915–1997), professor of geography at Liverpool University and principal of the University College of Swansea
- Robert K. Steel (born 1951), president and CEO of Wachovia Corporation

== See also ==
- Robert Steele (disambiguation)
