= Charlie Storms =

American Old West gunman (1823–1881)

Charles Spencer Storms (1823–1881) was a professional gunfighter and gambler of the Old West, who is best known for having been killed in a gunfight with Luke Short in Tombstone, Arizona.

== Early life ==
Charlie Storms was born in New York, as is shown by public records. Storms was reported by the Tombstone Epitaph to have been in California during the Gold Rush of 1849, which is corroborated by an entry in the 1852 California state census for the city of Sacramento, that lists 29-year-old "Chas. S. Storms", a laborer born in New York who had last lived in Mexico.

== Gambler and gunfighter ==
He had a reputation as being a skilled gunman during the 1870s and afterward, and traveled to many towns throughout the Old West as a gambler. He drifted from place to place, including Deer Lodge, Virginia City, Leadville, and Dodge City, and Deadwood, during which time he was involved in at least three shooting incidents. When Wild Bill Hickok was murdered by Jack McCall in Deadwood, South Dakota, Storms was reportedly in town at the same time, and he was rumored to have stolen one of Hickok's pistols as a souvenir, although this was never proven.

He left El Paso, Texas, and arrived in Tombstone in 1881. He was a well-known gambler and frequented saloons in town.

== Fatal argument ==
On February 25, 1881, Storms had been drinking all night and made several rude remarks to faro dealer Luke Short in the Oriental Saloon. Storms had successfully defended himself several times with his pistol. He had inaccurately sized Short up as someone who, according to Bat Masterson, he could "slap in the face without expecting a return." Masterson knew both men.

Charlie Storms was one of the best-known gamblers in the entire West, and had, on several occasions, successfully defended himself in pistol fights with Western 'gunfighters...

Charlie Storms and I were very close friends, as much as Short and I were, and for that reason, I did not care to see him get into what I knew would be a very serious difficulty. Storms did not know Short, and like the bad man in Leadville, had sized him up as an insignificant-looking fellow, whom he could slap in the face without expecting a return. Both were about to pull their pistols when I jumped between them and grabbed Storms, at the same time requesting Luke not to shoot, a request I knew he would respect if it was possible without endangering his own life too much. I had no trouble in getting Storms out of the house, as he knew me to be his friend. When Storms and I reached the street, I advised him to go to his room and take a sleep, for I then learned for the first time that he had been up all night, and had been quarreling with other persons...

I was just explaining to Luke that Storms was a very decent sort of man when, lo and behold!, there he stood before us, without saying a word, at the same time pulling his pistol. Luke stuck the muzzle of his pistol against Storm's heart and pulled the trigger. The bullet tore the heart asunder, and as he was falling, Luke shot him again. Storms was dead when he hit the ground.

Short shot Storms in the chest twice at point-blank range, setting his shirt on fire. Short reportedly told Bat Masterson, "You sure pick some of the damnedest friends, Bat".

Tombstone physician George E. Goodfellow was only a few feet from Storms when he was killed. "In the spring of 1881, I was a few feet distant from a couple of individuals [Luke Short and Charlie Storms] who were quarreling. They began shooting. The first shot took effect, as was afterward ascertained, in the left breast of one of them, who, after being shot, and while staggering back some 12 feet, cocked and fired his pistol twice, his second shot going into the air, for by that time he was on his back." He found two thicknesses of silk wrapped around the bullet and two tears where it had struck the vertebral column.

Examining Storms afterward, Goodfellow found that he had been shot in the heart, but was surprised to see "not a drop of blood" exiting the wound. He discovered that the bullet had ripped through the man's clothes and into a folded silk handkerchief in his breast pocket. He extracted the intact bullet from the wound with the silk wrapped around it. As a result of what he learned, Goodfellow began experimenting with the first designs for bullet-resistant clothing made of multiple layers of silk.

Short was arrested by Tombstone City Marshal Ben Sippy for killing Storms. During the preliminary hearing, Masterson testified that Short acted in self defense, so Short was released. The Arizona Weekly reported that Storms was around 60 years old and that he was survived by a widow in San Francisco. The 1870 Census returns lists a Mrs. Mary Storms, aged 40, born at sea, residing in the same San Francisco household with Charles Storms, along with two brothers Henry and George Goodman, aged 24 and 16, respectively, who may have been her sons from an earlier marriage. The San Francisco Call for November 26, 1903, at page 15 lists the death notice of "Mrs. Mary Storms," aged 84, who died on November 24 at the University Mound Ladies Home, an assisted-care living facility for elderly women.
