= Long Branch Saloon gunfight =

American Old West gunfight

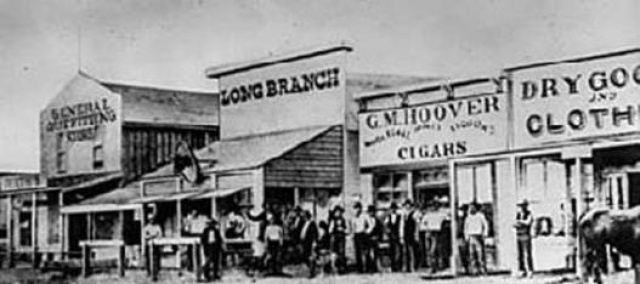
- The Long Branch Saloon in 1874.
- Date: April 5, 1879
- Location: Dodge City, Kansas, U.S.
- Participants: Frank Loving; Levi Richardson †
- Outcome: 1 killed 1 wounded

The Long Branch Saloon gunfight, on April 5, 1879, was an altercation that took place between Frank Loving and Levi Richardson at the Long Branch Saloon in Dodge City, Kansas. Both men were gamblers who frequented the saloon.

== Background ==
Frank Loving was a 19-year-old gambler at the time of the fight. Although often referred to as being a gunfighter, that reputation did not develop until after this event. Loving had come to Dodge City from Texas, and had arrived the year before. He had settled into the gambler's life of the busy cattle town, and gotten married. Loving became friends with Long Branch owner Chalkey Beeson, and become associated with several notable gunmen, gamblers and lawmen of the day, including Doc Holliday, Wyatt Earp, Bat Masterson, John Allen, as well as Levi Richardson.

Levi Richardson had a tough disposition and was disliked by most, but did get along fairly well with Bat Masterson. He had a reputation as a gunman, despite it being mostly hearsay. In early 1879, Loving quarreled with Richardson, claiming that Richardson was making unwanted and disrespectful advances toward his wife, Mattie Loving. The two threw taunts back and forth for a time, but with nothing more than verbal confrontations until March of that year, when the two became involved in a fist fight on Front Street. After exchanging punches, Richardson threatened, "I'll blow the guts out of you, you cockeyed son of a bitch." Loving, not being armed, simply turned and walked away.

== The gunfight ==
On April 5, 1879, Richardson strode into the Long Branch Saloon specifically looking for Loving. Loving, however, was not there at that time. Richardson settled into a game of poker. Around 9:00 p.m., Loving entered the bar, this time armed. Loving took a seat at a long table, at which point Richardson moved over and sat across from him. The two men could be heard talking low to one another, but what was said could not be understood. Suddenly, Richardson said loudly "You wouldn't fight anything, you damned son of a bitch," to which Loving said calmly, "Try me and see."

Richardson stood and drew his gun, which prompted Loving to do the same. Both men fired their weapons repeatedly, with Richardson firing five rounds and Loving firing six. When the shooting stopped, Richardson had been shot in the chest, the side, and the arm. Loving was grazed on the hand by one bullet, but otherwise was uninjured. Town Marshal Charlie Bassett quickly responded, having heard the shots, but Deputy Marshal Duffey arrived first, and took hold of Richardson as he crumpled to the floor. No one else in the saloon was injured. Loving was arrested as was standard procedure in such a case. On April 7, 1879, a coroners inquest ruled the shooting self defense, and Loving was released without charges. The Globe newspaper said of the fight; "...it seemed strange that Loving was not hit, except for a slight scratch on the hand, as the two men were so close together that their pistols almost touched each other..."
