= Bob Steele (cricketer) =

Australian cricketer

Personal information
- Full name: Harry Cornwall Steele
- Born: 22 April 1901; Darlinghurst, Sydney, Australia
- Died: 9 November 1985 (aged 84); Sydney, Australia
- Source: ESPNcricinfo, 2 February 2017

Bob Steele (22 April 1901 – 9 November 1985) was an Australian cricketer. He played five first-class matches for New South Wales between 1926/27 and 1927/28.

He was a left handed batter, had a leg-break bowling style and was not a wicket keeper.

== See also ==
- List of New South Wales representative cricketers
