= South Spring Ranch =

- U.S. National Register of Historic Places
- U.S. Historic district
- Location within New Mexico
- Location: Rt. 2, Roswell, New Mexico
- Coordinates: 33°20′46″N 104°28′10″W
- Area: 7 acres (2.8 ha)
- Architectural style: Hipped box
- MPS: Roswell New Mexico MRA
- NRHP reference No.: 88003465
- Added to NRHP: April 24, 1989

The South Spring Ranch, on Rt. 2 in Roswell, New Mexico, was listed on the National Register of Historic Places in 1989. The listing included five contributing buildings on 7 acres (2.8 ha).

The ranch was established in 1874 by John Chisum, to serve as headquarters of his wide-ranging cattle operations. It has also been known as Jinglebob Ranch.

Its main house, built in 1902, is deemed non-contributing to the historic character of the ranch, due to modifications in the 1950s. It was originally a three-story red brick mansion.

Another brick house, built in early 1900s in "Hipped Box" style, is contributing.
