= Chalkley Beeson =

American businessman and lawman

Chalkley McArtor Beeson
- Born: April 24, 1848; Salem, Ohio, United States
- Died: August 9, 1912 (aged 64); Dodge City, Kansas, United States
- Other name: Chalk
- Occupations: Hunting party guide; Cattle rancher; Musician; Saloon owner; Sheriff of Dodge City; Ford County state representative (1903–1908)
- Known for: Owner of Long Branch Saloon
- Spouse: Ida Gause (m. 1876)
- Children: Stella Beeson (1877-1877); Merritt Beeson (1878–1956); Claude L. Beeson (1881–1886); Allen B. Beeson (1885–1889); T.S. Beeson (1888–1900); Otero Beeson (1889–1944)

Chalkley McArtor "Chalk" Beeson (April 24, 1848 – August 9, 1912) was a well-known businessman, lawman, cattleman and musician but was best known for his ownership of the famous Long Branch Saloon in Dodge City, Kansas.

== Biography ==
Originally from Salem, Ohio, Beeson was the seventh-born child of Samuel and Martha Beeson. The family moved to Marshalltown, Iowa shortly after his birth. In 1866 the 18-year-old Beeson left Marshalltown and headed west to Texas, where he found employment as a cowboy. Years later, Charles Goodnight would say of Beeson: "He was the best cowboy on the trail ... could stampede or quiet a herd quicker than any rustler I ever met." During 1872 the 24-year-old Beeson was living in Colorado. He worked, for a time, as a guide to buffalo hunters, with his clients including Grand Duke Alexei Alexandrovich of Russia, Phil Sheridan, and George Custer.

=== Life in Colorado ===
When the hunt ended, Beeson returned to Pueblo, Colorado where he participated in many civic activities. He was a member of the volunteer fire department and also Pueblo's baseball team. For employment, he drove a stagecoach between Denver and Colorado Springs. By 1875 Beeson grew bored with Pueblo and relocated to the three-year-old town of Dodge City, Kansas.

=== Marriage ===
In 1876, Chalk Beeson returned home to Marshalltown, Iowa, where he married 22-year-old Ida Gause on July 17. The newlyweds intended to locate in Kansas City, Missouri. Before they could do so, Chalk had to return to Dodge City to collect money owed him by A. J. Peacock, the owner of the Billiard Hall Saloon. Peacock was unable to pay Beeson in cash and handed him the deed to the establishment as payment.

=== Dodge City Saloon owner ===
Ida Beeson had to adjust to the fact that her husband was a Dodge City saloon owner. She was able to take some comfort in the fact that her husband provided an alternative to "entertainment" usually provided by frontier saloons – namely prostitutes. What Beeson provided may not have been as exciting to a Texas cowboy just arriving from a long drive, but it was certainly more cultural. Chalk Beeson offered a full orchestra. Beeson changed the name of his business to the Saratoga Saloon. According to a local paper: "It is a rare treat to drop in at the Saratoga upon Mr. Beeson, and listen to his last and best musical combination. Mr. Beeson is a thorough lover of good music, and by his skillful selection of good performers ... draws crowds of attentive listeners."

=== Long Branch Saloon ===
Encouraged by his success with the Saratoga, Beeson decided to take a chance on another saloon. The Long Branch Saloon had been founded early in 1873 by Charles E. Bassett and A.J. Peacock. The saloon changed hands several times. On March 1, 1878, Beeson purchased the Long Branch from the firm of Dexter D. Colley and James M. Manion. Soon after purchasing the Long Branch, Beeson took William H. Harris as his partner. Also with Harris, Beeson established the COD Cattle Ranch, south of Dodge City. During the next several years, the firm of Beeson & Harris became a minor conglomerate whose holdings were located in such far-flung locations as Las Animas, Colorado and Tombstone, Arizona. After owning it for five years, Beeson grew bored with the Long Branch and sold his share of the business to Luke Short on February 6, 1883. In 1884 Beeson purchased a farm some two miles from Dodge City and moved his family there.

=== Dodge City Cowboy Band ===
In 1884 Beeson formed the "Dodge City Cowboy Band. The group was well received wherever it played. The band members cut dashing figures in full "cowboy" regalia – enormous white stetsons, blue flannel shirts and boots festooned with ornamental spurs. Their fame finally spread far enough that they were featured performers in the March 4, 1889, inaugural parade of President Benjamin Harrison. The parade marked the Dodge City Band's finest hour, and also their final hour. Soon after their return to Dodge City, Beeson sold the ownership of the band to a man from Colorado. The transaction included most of the musical instruments and the right to use the name – all for a purchase price of $750.

=== Sheriff of Ford County, Kansas ===
In November 1891, 43-year-old Chalk Beeson was elected sheriff of Ford County, Kansas. On November 1, 1892, Oliver Yantis and two accomplices robbed a Speareville, Kansas bank of $1,697. After Yantis was identified as being in Oklahoma, Sheriff Beeson journeyed there and secured a warrant for him. On November 30, 1892, Beeson, accompanied by three Oklahoma lawmen, tracked Yantis to the residence where he was hiding. A gunfight with the posse followed in which Yantis was mortally wounded. Beeson served two terms as sheriff with distinction and left office in 1896. For the remainder of his life, Beeson concentrated on his cattle ranching. He was occasionally called upon for public service and served four separate terms in the Kansas State legislature between 1903 and 1908.

=== Death and legacy ===
On the morning of Tuesday, August 6, 1912, with routine ranch chores to attend to, Chalk mounted a horse that was unusually skittish. When he attempted to dismount, the horse bucked and sent Beeson flying. On Friday, August 9, 1912, Chalk Beeson died. His family managed to keep his memory alive for decades after his death. In 1915 his sons, Merritt and Otero, opened the Beeson Theater on First Avenue in Dodge City. His widow, Ida Beeson, remained a prominent member of Dodge City society until her death on June 15, 1928. In 1932, Merritt Beeson opened the Beeson Museum, which became a popular tourist attraction. After Merritt Beeson died on January 28, 1956, his widow managed the museum until 1964, when its large collection of historic documents, photos and artifacts were sold to Dodge City's Boot Hill Museum, Inc.

== Bibliography ==
- DeMattos, Jack. "The Dodge Citians: Chalk Beeson," NOLA Quarterly (Vol. XXI, No. 1), January–March 1997.
- Miller, Nyle H. and Snell, Joseph W. Why the West Was Wild. Topeka: Kansas State Historical Society, 1963.
- Shillingberg, Wm. B. Dodge City: The Early Years, 1872-1886. Norman, OK: The Arthur H. Clark Company, 2009. ISBN 978-0-87062-378-3.
- Young, Fredric R. The Delectable Burg: An Irreverent History of Dodge City - 1872 to 1886. Dodge City, KS: The Boot Hill Museum, Inc., 2009. ISBN 978-1-882404-10-0.

Police appointments
Preceded by Hamilton B. "Ham" Bell	Sheriff of Ford County, Kansas; 1891–1896	Succeeded by Hamilton B. "Ham" Bell
