= Gunfighter =

Infamous gunmen of the American Old West

Gunfighters, also called gunslingers (/ˈɡʌnslɪŋər/), were individuals in the American Old West who gained a reputation of being dangerous with a firearm and participated in deadly shootouts. The gunfighter can be a lawman, outlaw, cowboy, shooting exhibitionist, or a hired gun, who is quick on the draw with a handgun or highly skilled with rifles and shotguns. The feats of such individuals would end up becoming part of frontier folklore, and through the years would gain increasing degree of exaggeration. In modern times, many historians attempted to separate fact and fiction between such historical gunmen.

Nevertheless, the gunfighter had an impact in both history and in popular culture, becoming one of the most enduring characters in the Western genre. These characters appeared in many associated films, television shows, video games, and literature. Gunfighters influenced other fields as well, from sports shooting, fashion, to military skills based on their supposed abilities. The influence of gunfighters also garnered interest internationally, with many foreign fictional characters and stories derived or based from the character of the gunfighter.

== Origin of the term ==
In his introduction to The Shootist (1976), author Glendon Swarthout says "gunslinger" and "gunfighter" are modern terms, and the more authentic terms for the period would have been "gunman", "pistoleer", "shootist", or "bad man" (sometimes written as "badman"). Swarthout seems to have been correct about "gunslinger", but the term "gunfighter" existed in several newspapers in the 1870s. Bat Masterson used the term "gunfighter" in the newspaper articles which he wrote about the lawmen and outlaws whom he had known. However, Joseph Rosa noted that, even though Masterson used the term "gunfighter", he "preferred the term 'mankiller'" when discussing these individuals. On the other hand, the term "gunslinger" was first used in the Western film Drag Harlan (1920). The word was soon adopted by other Western writers, such as Zane Grey, and became common usage. Clay Allison (1841–1887), a notorious New Mexico and Texas gunman and cattleman, originated the term "shootist".

=== Usage ===
Often, the term has been applied to men who would hire out for contract killings or at a ranch embroiled in a range war where they would earn "fighting wages". Others, like Billy the Kid, were notorious bandits, and still others were lawmen like Pat Garrett and Wyatt Earp. A gunfighter could be an outlaw—a robber or murderer who took advantage of the wilderness of the frontier to hide from genteel society and to make periodic raids on it. The gunfighter could also be an agent of the state, archetypically a lone avenger, but more often a sheriff, whose duty was to face the outlaw and bring him to justice or to personally administer it. There were also a few historical cowboys who were actual gunfighters, such as the Cochise County Cowboys who participated in the bloody 1879 Skeleton Canyon massacre.

== Depiction in culture ==
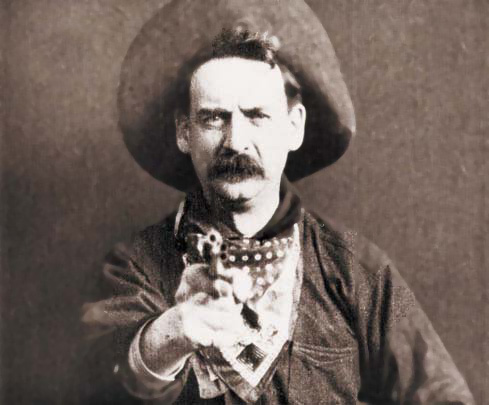
Gunslinger portrayed by Justus D. Barnes from The Great Train Robbery

Gunslingers frequently appear as stock characters in Western movies and novels, along with cowboys. Often, the hero of a Western meets his opposite "double", a mirror of his own evil side that he has to destroy. Western gunslinger heroes are portrayed as local lawmen or enforcement officers, ranchers, army officers, cowboys, territorial marshals, nomadic loners, or skilled fast-draw artists. They are normally masculine persons of integrity and principle – courageous, moral, tough, solid, and self-sufficient, maverick characters (often with trusty sidekicks), possessing an independent and honorable attitude (but often characterized as slow-talking). They are depicted as similar to a knight-errant, wandering from place to place with no particular direction, often facing curious and hostile enemies, while saving individuals or communities from those enemies in terms of chivalry. The Western hero usually stands alone and faces danger on his own, commonly against lawlessness, with an expert display of his physical skills (roping, gun-play, horse-handling, pioneering abilities, etc.) In films, the gunslinger often possesses a nearly superhuman speed and skill with the revolver. Twirling pistols, lightning draws, and trick shots are standard fare for the gunmen of the big screen.

== Fact and fiction ==
In real-life, a gunfight could be a spur-of-the-moment, with one drawing his pistol, and the other reacting. Often it would develop into a shootout where both men bolted for cover. Tales tended to grow with repeated telling, and a single fight might grow into a career-making reputation. For instance, the gunfight at the O.K. Corral made legends of Wyatt Earp and the Cochise County Cowboys, but they were relatively minor figures before that conflict. Some gunslingers, such as Bat Masterson, actively engaged in self-promotion. How famous gunfighters died is as varied as each man. Many well-known gunfighters were so feared by the public because of their reputation that when they were killed, they died as a result of ambush rather than going down in a "blaze of glory".

Gunfighters King Fisher, John Wesley Hardin, Ben Thompson, Billy the Kid, Wild Bill Hickok, and Pat Garrett all died as a result of ambushes, killed by men who feared them because of their reputation. Gunmen Kid Curry, Jim Courtright, Dallas Stoudenmire and Dave Rudabaugh were killed in raging gun battles, much as portrayed in films about the era, and usually against more than one opponent. Bill Longley and Tom Horn were executed. Famed gunman Clay Allison died in a wagon accident. Gunmen Wyatt Earp, Bat Masterson, Bass Reeves, Commodore Perry Owens, and Luke Short all died of natural causes, living out their lives on reputation and avoiding conflict in secluded retirement. Gunfighter and lawman Frank Eaton, known as "Pistol Pete", lived into old age and gained further fame, before his death at age 97, by becoming the mascot for Oklahoma A&M College (now Oklahoma State University). Rare are the gunfighters who, like William Sidney "Cap" Light, died accidentally by their own hand.

=== Skills ===
Mythology and folklore often exaggerate the skills of famous gunfighters. Most of these historical figures were not known to be capable of trick shooting, nor did they necessarily have a reputation for precision sharpshooting. Such tropes that are frequently seen in Westerns include shooting the center of a coin, stylistic pistol twirling, glancing shots that intentionally only graze an opponent (the bullet through the hat being an example), shooting an opponent's belt buckle (thus dropping his pants), a bullet cutting the hangman's rope, or shooting the guns out of opponents' hands (typically as an alternative to killing). The last was debunked by Mythbusters as an impossibility, as unjacketed bullets tend to shatter into fragments that can hurt or even kill. Ed McGivern dispelled the myth of the inaccuracy of pistol fanning by shooting tight groups while fanning the revolver. Quick draw and hip shooting were rare skills in the West, and only a handful of historically known gunslingers were known to be fast, such as Luke Short, John Wesley Hardin, and Wild Bill Hickok. Shooting a pistol with one hand is normally associated with gunslingers, and is also a standard for them of the era to carry two guns and fire ambidextrously. Capt. Jonathan R. Davis carried two revolvers in his iconic gunfight, while Jesse James himself carried over half a dozen revolvers in many of his gunfights.

=== Tools ===
In Western movies, the characters' gun belts are often worn low on the hip and outer thigh, with the holster cut away around the pistol's trigger and grip for a smooth, fast draw. This type of holster is a Hollywood anachronism. Fast-draw artists can be distinguished from other movie cowboys because their guns will often be tied to their thigh. Long before holsters were steel-lined, they were soft and supple for comfortable all-day wear. A gunfighter would use tie-downs to keep his pistol from catching on the holster while drawing. Most of the time, gunfighters would just hide their pistols in their pockets and waistbands. Wild Bill Hickok popularized the butt-forward holster type, which worked better on horseback. Other gunfighters would use bridgeport rigs that gave a faster and easier draw. Revolvers were a popular weapon to gunfighters who were horsemen, cowboys, and lawmen because of their concealability and effectiveness on horseback. The Winchester rifle was also a popular weapon among gunfighters. Dubbed the "Gun that Won the West", it was widely used during the settlement of the American frontier. Shotguns were also a popular weapon for many gunfighters, most notably Jim Miller.

== Famous gunfights ==
The most important lesson I learned ... was that the winner of a gunplay usually was the one who took his time. The second was that, if I hoped to live on the frontier, I would shun flashy trick-shooting—grandstand play—as I would poison ... In all my life as a frontier peace officer, I did not know a really proficient gunfighter who had anything but contempt for the gun-fanner, or the man who literally shot from the hip...

— Wyatt Earp

The frequency and drama of gunfights in the "Wild West" were highly exaggerated by dime novel authors in the late 19th century. An estimate of 20,000 men in the American West were killed by gunshot between 1866 and 1900. Actual gunfights in the Old West were very rare, and when gunfights did occur, their causes varied. Some were unpremeditated fights incited by strong emotions, while others were the results of longstanding feuds, or were between criminals and law enforcement. Some of these shootouts became famous, while others are lost to history. Gunfights were usually close-up and personal, with a number of shots blasted from pistols, often resulting in innocent bystanders hit by bullets gone wild. Much of the time, it would be difficult to tell who had "won" the gunfight for several minutes, as the black powder smoke from the pistols cleared the air.

The most notable and well-known took place in the states/territories of Arizona, New Mexico, Kansas, Oklahoma, and Texas. To prevent gunfights, many cities in the American frontier, such as Dodge City and Tombstone, issued local ordinances to prohibit firearms in the area. Some of the most iconic gunfights in Old West history included:

- The Gunfight at the O.K. Corral that happened on October 26, 1881, between Earp Brothers together with Doc Holliday, and the Clanton-McLaury gang. The shootout, which happened when the Earp party attempted to disarm the Cochise cowboys, ended up with the two simultaneously drawing their guns and leaving three of the cowboys dead. The whole affair lasted only 30 seconds, contrary to many of its movie adaptations.
- On April 14, 1881, a shootout that became known as the Four Dead in Five Seconds Gunfight occurred when El Paso lawman Dallas Stoudenmire opened fire on armed Mexican vaqueros inside a saloon with his twin .44 caliber revolvers, killing four, including an innocent bystander.
- Another well-known gunfight occurred on December 19, 1854, when Captain Jonathan R. Davis, a Mexican-American War veteran and miner, was ambushed by a gang en route to the California Gold Rush. David ended up killing twelve bandits; the most number of kills in a single gunfight by one man in history.
- The Frisco shootout which pitted town sheriff Elfego Baca against 80 gunmen while holed up inside a cabin. Over 400 bullet holes punctured the house over the course of 36-hours. But during that siege, Baca killed four and wounded several more, resulting in his enemy's retreat.

The most famous type of gunfight in popular imagination, however, were the one-on-one "quick-draw" duels that happened in the Old West. Although the frequency of such incidents is greatly exaggerated in popular culture, a number of individual shootouts that ulitized such fast draw did occur, though rarely. These duels were first recorded in the South, brought by emigrants to the American Frontier as a crude form of the "code duello," a highly formalized means of solving disputes between gentlemen with swords or guns that had its origins in European chivalry. By the second half of the 19th century, few Americans still fought duels to solve their problems, and it became a thing of the past in the United States by the start of the 20th century. Writer Wyatt-Brown in his book "Southern Honor: Ethics and Behavior in the Old South" described dueling in the American frontier as a "custom", and was primarily used for teenage disputes, rise in rank, status, and scapegoating. Some well-known examples included:

- The Hickok–Tutt shootout, which happened on July 21, 1865, in Springfield, Missouri, was arguably the most well-known and most documented. Wild Bill Hickok and Davis Tutt quarreled over cards and decided to have a gunfight. They arranged to meet each other in a plaza at 6 pm. When they were about 50 yards apart, both men drew their guns. The two fired at the same time, but Hickok's shot hit Tutt in the heart, killing him, while Tutt's shot missed.
- The Short-Courtright duel that happened in Fort Worth, Texas. A quarrel between fellow gunfighters Luke Short and Timothy Isaiah "Longhair Jim" Courtright over a protection racket on Short's saloon resulted in a gunfight. As the two men stood three to four feet from each other during an argument, Courtright drew his gun, prompting Short to draw his in reply. The latter ended up emptying his gun at the former, killing him.
- The Long Branch Saloon Shootout, involved Levi Richardson, a buffalo hunter, and "Cockeyed Frank" Loving, a professional gambler, and happened on April 5, 1879. Richardson had developed some affection for Loving's wife Mattie, and the two began to argue about her. In the saloon, Frank sat down at a long table, Richardson turned around and took a seat at the same table. The two were then heard speaking in low voices. After the conversation, Richardson drew his pistol, and Loving drew his in response. The shootout ended with the death of Richardson.
- On March 9, 1877, gamblers Jim Leavy and Charlie Harrison argued over a game of cards in a saloon in Cheyenne, Wyoming. The argument escalated to the point that the two decided to face each other in an alleyway. Harrison shot first but missed. Levy aimed carefully and hit Harrison, who died a week later.

== Living on reputation ==
Most Old West men who were labeled as being "gunfighters" did not kill nearly as many men in gunfights as they were given credit for, if any at all. They were often labeled as such due to one particular instance, which developed from rumors about them having been involved in many more events than they actually were. Often their reputation was as much "self-promotion" as anything else; such was the case of Bat Masterson. Wyatt Earp with his brothers Morgan and Virgil along with Doc Holliday killed three outlaw Cowboys in the Gunfight at the O.K. Corral in Tombstone, Arizona Territory. He has been said to have been involved in more than one hundred gunfights in his lifetime. But Prof. Bill O'Neal cites just five incidents in his Encyclopedia of Western Gunfighters. Earp expressed his dismay about the controversy that followed him his entire life. He wrote in a letter to John Hays Hammond on May 21, 1925, that "notoriety had been the bane of my life."

After his brother Virgil was maimed in an ambush and Morgan was assassinated by hidden assailants, the men suspected of involvement were provided alibis by fellow Cowboys and released without trial. Wyatt and his brother Warren set out on a vendetta ride to locate and kill those they felt were responsible. Wyatt has been portrayed in a number of films and books as a fearless Western hero. He is often viewed as the central character and hero of the Gunfight at the O.K. Corral, at least in part because he was the only one who was not wounded or killed. In fact, his brother, Tombstone Marshal and Deputy U.S. Marshal Virgil Earp had considerably more experience with weapons and combat as a Union soldier in the Civil War, and in law enforcement as a sheriff, constable, and marshal. As city marshal, Virgil made the decision to disarm the Cowboys in Tombstone and requested Wyatt's assistance.

There are no records to support the reputation that Johnny Ringo developed. Of the documented instances where Ringo killed men, they were unarmed, and there is no evidence to support his participation in a single gunfight. Others deserved the reputation associated with them. Jim Courtright and Dallas Stoudenmire both killed several men in gunfights both as lawmen and as civilians. Clay Allison and Ben Thompson had well-deserved reputations. At the same time, gunmen like Scott Cooley are all but unknown, when they actually led a life reflective of what most would consider a gunfighter to be.

In other cases, certain gunfighters were possibly confused, over time, with being someone else with a similar name. The most well-known of Butch Cassidy's Wild Bunch gang, the Sundance Kid, was in reality only known to have been in one shootout during his lifetime, and no gunfights. Some historians have since stated that it is possible that over time he was confused with another Wild Bunch member, Kid Curry, who was without a doubt the most dangerous member of the gang, having killed many lawmen and civilians during his lifetime before being killed himself.

== Outlaw or lawman ==
It is often difficult to separate lawmen of the Old West from outlaws of the Old West. In many cases, the term gunfighter was applied to constables. Despite idealistic portrayals in television, movies, and even in history books, very few lawmen/gunfighters could claim their law enforcement role as their only source of employment. Unlike contemporary peace officers, these lawmen generally pursued other occupations, often earning money as gamblers, business owners, or outlaws—as was the case with "Curly" Bill Brocius, who, while always referred to as an outlaw, served as a deputy sheriff under sheriff Johnny Behan. Many shootouts involving lawmen were caused by disputes arising from these alternative occupations, rather than the lawman's attempts to enforce the law.

Tom Horn, historically cited as an assassin, served both as a deputy sheriff and as a Pinkerton detective, a job in which he shot at least three people as a killer for hire. Ben Thompson, best known as a gunfighter and gambler, was a very successful chief of police in Austin, Texas. King Fisher had great success as a county sheriff in Texas. Doc Holliday and Billy the Kid both wore badges as lawmen at least once. "Big" Steve Long served as deputy marshal for Laramie, Wyoming, while the entire time committing murders and forced theft of land deeds.

Known gunmen/lawmen were generally effective, and in time the violence would subside, usually, after the gunman/lawman had been involved in several shooting incidents, eventually leading to a substantial and well-earned fear that kept everyone in line. At times they were hired by cattlemen or other prominent figures to serve as henchmen or enforcers during cattle wars. Although sanctioned by law enforcement officials, the gunmen were not always actually deputized. Sometimes, however, just to make things "official", they would go through the formality of deputization. A case in point: the service of the Jesse Evans Gang, and outlaw Jesse Evans himself, as agents for the Murphy-Dolan faction during the Lincoln County War.

Usually, when a gunman was hired by a town as town marshal, they received the full support of the townspeople until order was restored, at which point the town would tactfully indicate it was time for a change to a less dangerous lawman who relied more on respect than fear to enforce the law. A good example was the 1882 decision by the El Paso, Texas, town council to dismiss Town Marshal Dallas Stoudenmire. He entered the council hall and dared the councilors to try to take his guns or his job, at which point they immediately changed their mind, saying he could keep his job.

== Legacy ==
=== Modern gunslinger ===
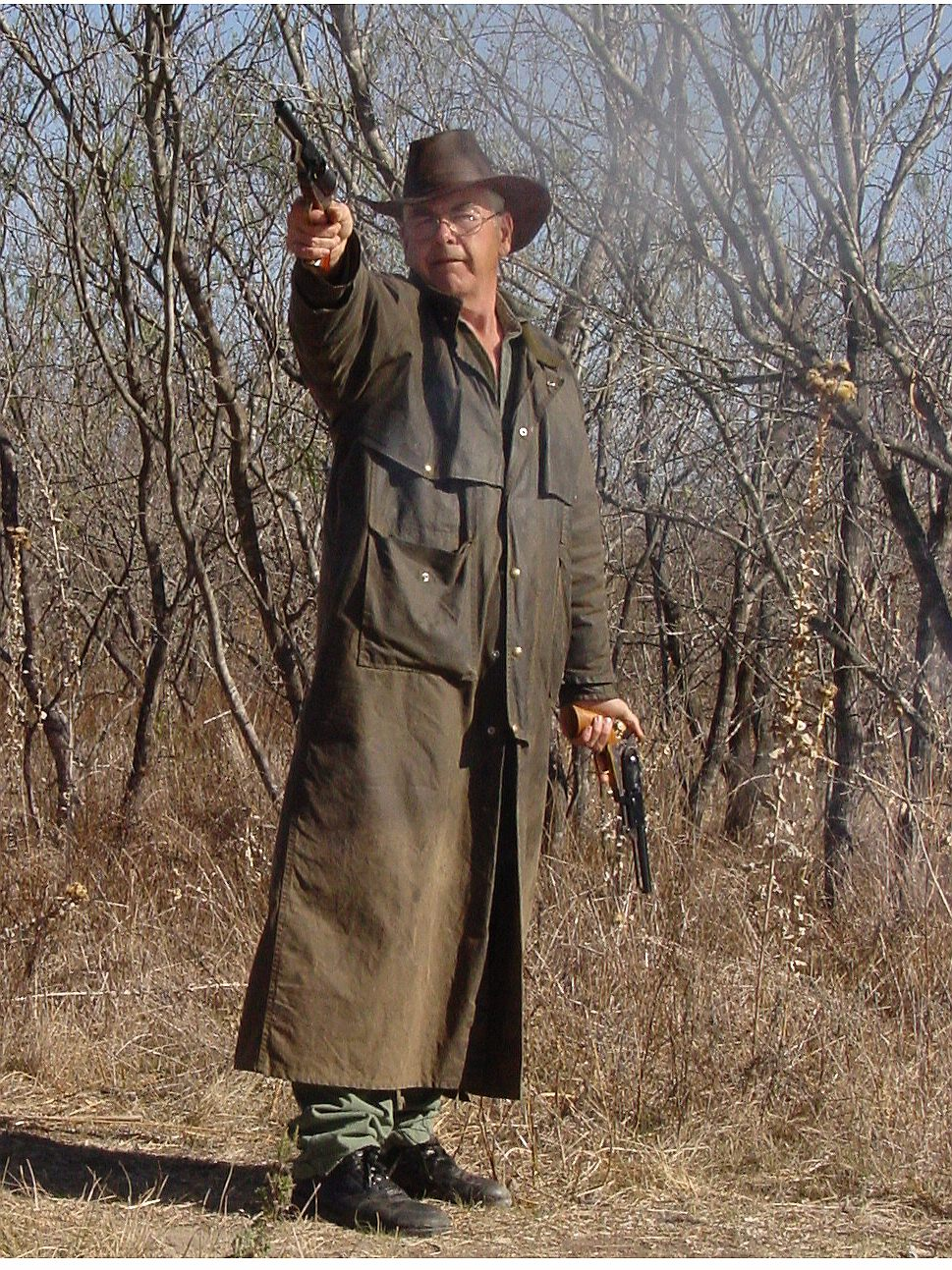
A cowboy action shooter brandishing his revolver

Alongside the iconic cowboy, gunfighters have become a cultural image of the American people abroad, and also as an idealized image of violence, frontier justice, and adventure. Even outside of the Western genre, the term 'gunslinger' has been used in modern times to describe someone who is fast and accurate with pistols, either in real life or in other fictional action genres. The quick draw that gunfighters helped popularize have also influenced pistol drills and techniques in the American military and law enforcement communities.

People relive the Wild West both historically and in popular culture by participating in cowboy action shooting events, where each gunslinger adopts his or her own look representing a character from Western life in the late 1800s, and as part of that character, chooses an alias to go by. The sport originated in Southern California, USA, in the early 1980s but is now practiced in many places with several sanctioning organizations including the Single Action Shooting Society (SASS), Western Action Shootists Association (WASA), and National Congress of Old West Shooters (NCOWS), as well as others in the US and in other countries.

=== In popular culture ===
Gunfighters have been featured in media even outside the Western genre, often combined with other elements and genres, mainly science-fiction space Westerns, steampunk, and the contemporary setting. Abilities, clothing, and attitude associated with gunfighters are seen in many other genres. An example of this is "Han shot first", in which Han Solo, a gunfighter-like protagonist in Star Wars, kills his opponent with a subtle, under-the-table draw. He also wore his holster low on, and tied to, the thigh with a cutaway for the trigger. Roland Deschain from the fantasy series The Dark Tower is a gunfighter pitted against fantasy-themed monsters and enemies. Inspired by the "Man with No Name" and other spaghetti-western characters, he himself is detached or unsympathetic, often reacting as uncaring or angry at signs of cowardice or self-pity, yet he possesses a strong sense of heroism, often attempting to help those in need, a morality much seen in Westerns.

Jonah Hex, from DC Comics, is a ruthless bounty hunter bound by a personal code of honor to protect and avenge the innocent. IGN ranked Jonah Hex the 73rd greatest comic book hero of all time. Throughout the DC Universe, Hex has been, on many occasions, transported from the Old West to the contemporary setting and beyond. Even in unfamiliar territory and time periods, Hex managed to outgun his enemies with more advanced weaponry. Two-Gun Kid is another comic book gunfighter from Marvel Comics. Skilled with revolvers, he has aided many superheroes in future timelines, most notably She-Hulk.

Many Japanese manga and anime have also adopted the western genre. Yasuhiro Nightow is known for creating the space Western Trigun. The story's protagonist, Vash the Stampede, is a wandering gunslinger with a dark past. Unlike other violence-themed gunslingers, Vash carries a Shane-like pacifist attitude, and avoids killing men, even dangerous enemies. Behind him is the gun-toting priest named Nicholas D. Wolfwood, who carries with him a heavy machine gun and rocket launcher shaped like a cross. Nicholas is more violent than Vash, and the two would often argue about killing opponents. Other western genre-themed manga and anime include Cowboy Bebop and Kino's Journey, which both incorporate knight-errant gunslinger themes.

Modern-day western gunslingers have also appeared in recent Neo-Westerns. Raylan Givens from the television series Justified shares the same ambiguous moral code of an Old West sheriff, even using a fast draw to dispatch his enemies. The hitman Anton Chigurh from No Country for Old Men shares many elements of a hunted outlaw. Additionally, the comic book character Vigilante is a self-proclaimed gunfighter born in the 1940s.

Gunfighters have also been featured in many video games, both in traditional Old West and in contemporary and future settings. Colton White was the protagonist of 2005's best-selling western video game Gun. Another well-known video game Western protagonist is John Marston from Red Dead Redemption, who was nominated for 2010 Spike's Video Game Awards, as well as his friend Arthur Morgan in Red Dead Redemption 2. The New York Times stated: "he and his creators conjure such a convincing, cohesive and enthralling re-imagination of the real world that it sets a new standard for sophistication and ambition in electronic gaming." The main character Caleb in the video games Blood and Blood II: The Chosen is also a former Old West gunfighter. Gunfighter is also a callsign for a group of two Apache Helicopters in the video game Medal of Honor. They appear on a mission named "Gunfighters", and the player will act as Captain Brad "Hawk" Hawkins from 1st Aviation Regiment.

Former professional American football quarterback Brett Favre was nicknamed "The Gunslinger" due to his rural, Southern upbringing and his wild, risky, quick-throwing play style that led him to great success in the National Football League.
