= Variety Hall shootout =

Gunfight in Las Vegas, New Mexico in 1880

The Variety Hall shootout, also called the Las Vegas Saloon Shootout (January 22, 1880), was a gunfight that took place in Las Vegas, New Mexico, United States. It launched gunman "Mysterious" Dave Mather to fame.

Mather had first ventured to Las Vegas as a part of the Dodge City Gang, which also included gunmen John Joshua Webb and Dave Rudabaugh. Gambler Doc Holliday was also in town at the time, and though generally listed as a member, he was not. However, he was a friend to the gang and co-owned a business with Webb. The gang was organized by Justice of the Peace Hoodoo Brown, to control the gambling houses in Las Vegas, muscling out any unwanted rivals, thus raking in profits. Dave Mather at that time had a reputation as a gunman, but no real documented accounts of gunfights short of his involvement in the Railroad Wars as a hired gun, with his time in Las Vegas being prior to his well-known 1884 gunfight with lawman Tom Nixon in Dodge City, Kansas.

On January 22, 1880, Marshal Joe Carson and Mather entered Close and Patterson's Variety Hall after receiving complaints from citizens of rowdy customers inside. Whether Mather was actually deputized has never been confirmed, but it is believed that he was because Las Vegas had a "no guns in town limits" ordinance in effect and Mather was armed.

The "rowdy customers" were cowboys T.J. House, James West, John Dorsey, and William "Big" Randall, who had been going in and out of saloons and generally making trouble. At some point during the proceedings the cowboys were alleged to have thrown their glasses at a bartender, and dared anyone present to stop them.

Upon entering Marshal Carson demanded that the cowboys relinquish their weapons. They refused. A gunfight started; who drew and/or fired first is not known. Marshal Carson was killed almost immediately. Mather killed Randall, wounded West and put him out of the fight, and wounded Dorsey, who managed to escape with House.

House and Dorsey were captured two weeks later, and taken to the Las Vegas jail to await trial. An angry mob broke into the jail, pulled House, Dorsey and West from their cell, and lynched them. The gunfight was the first substantiated account to which Mather's name could be attached, and it launched him into western fame as a gunman.
