= Gun (video game) =

2005 video game

- Developers: Neversoft; Beenox (PC); Rebellion Developments (PSP)
- Publisher: Activision
- Producers: Paul Gadbois; Dee Brown (PC)
- Programmers: Sebastien Poirier; Sylvain Morel (PC)
- Writer: Randall Jahnson
- Composer: Christopher Lennertz
- Platforms: Nintendo GameCube; PlayStation 2 Windows; Xbox; Xbox 360; PlayStation Portable
- Release: Nintendo GameCube, PlayStation 2, Windows, Xbox: NA: November 8, 2005; AU: November 9, 2005; EU: November 11, 2005; Xbox 360: NA: November 22, 2005; EU: December 2, 2005; PlayStation Portable: NA: October 10, 2006; EU: November 3, 2006; AU: November 15, 2006
- Genre: Action-adventure
- Modes: Single-player, multiplayer

Gun is a 2005 Western-themed action-adventure video game developed by Neversoft and published by Activision for the PlayStation 2, Xbox, GameCube, Windows, and Xbox 360 as a launch title. The PlayStation Portable (PSP) version was released a year later under the title Gun: Showdown, this version features new side-missions, a multiplayer mode, and other additions that were not available in the console versions. The Xbox version had online support through the "Live Aware" feature. Gun is now supported on Insignia, a revival server for original Xbox games.

During its first month, the game sold 225,000 copies across the four console systems for which it was initially released. The game had sold over 1.4 million units in the United States as of October 2008. It was well received by game critics and won several awards, including GameSpy's Xbox 360 Action Game of the Year.

== Gameplay ==
Gunfights are an important feature of the game, with enemies ranging from outlaws to wild animals.

Gun features an action role-playing game set in an open world environment, including side-missions that add to the story. Players control the protagonist, Colton White, from a third-person perspective. Side-missions improve the player stats. Players can purchase upgrades using money obtained from these optional activities and by mining gold veins.

While traveling from town to town, bandit attacks are frequent and players must either escape or defend themselves. Players can hunt and kill various animals like buffalo, wild horses, and even stray dogs and farm animals. The player can also cause mayhem within communities, but can attract attention from lawmakers and other gunslingers by doing so. They act as gunslingers protecting righteousness or seek reputation as they face resistance fighters, local lawmen, renegade soldiers and vengeful Apache and Blackfoot Confederacy groups. A Town Patience meter goes down every time a civilian is killed. Once the patience meter reaches zero, a showdown ensues between the player and the locals.

Several minigames are included in Gun. As the player progresses through the game, they can choose to complete side missions, including poker tournaments, cattle herding, law enforcement, time trials and bounty hunting.

=== Combat ===
Players can enter a first person quick draw mode during gameplay.

Players can wield a revolver and switch between rifles, shotguns, various explosives, and bows. There are a variety of types of arrows to choose from, including ordinary, flaming, and, if unlocked, explosive arrows. Throwing knives are available in Gun Showdown. Attacking and killing enemies fills up a Quickdraw gauge which, when activated, slows down time like bullet time, switches the game to a first-person perspective and gives the player unlimited ammunition for a short duration, allowing the player to take on a significant number of enemies.

The player can switch from first-person to third-person overhead camera with certain weapons. There are two handheld explosives available in the game: dynamite and whiskey bombs. Dynamite explodes after a short delay, while whiskey bombs instantly ignite when they hit the ground. Enemies may roll to attempt to avoid explosives. Barrels of TNT are scattered around the environment and during missions, encouraging players to use barrels to set traps or throw and use the Quickdraw mode to shoot them and detonate the TNT. Land mines are available on the PSP version.

Melee combat is also emphasized, with enemies randomly charging at the player throughout the game. Players can use a Bowie knife, tomahawk, and cavalry saber. They can use enemies as a human shield, and dispatch them by slitting their throats or knocking them out if the enemy has a bounty. Players can also scalp a dying enemy with a scalping knife. Stealth plays a part in many missions as well, and players are encouraged to use bows, melee and, on the PSP version, throwing knives, in such situations. Horseback combat is also featured, and is an important aspect of the game. Fast-paced chases are featured, and players can shoot while riding. Both the player's and the enemies' horses can be killed. While riding a horse players can do close-quarter combat with any melee weapon they possess. Trampling or running over enemies is also a way of dispatching them while on horseback.

== Synopsis ==
=== Setting ===
Gun is set in the American frontier, specifically in Montana, Arizona, Colorado, Kansas and New Mexico in the year 1880. This includes cities and badlands with populated environments that stretch from the mountains to the plains of early Dodge City, Kansas. The story, written by Randall Jahnson, features several veteran actors, including Ron Perlman, Lance Henriksen, Kris Kristofferson, Brad Dourif, Tom Skerritt and the lead, played by Thomas Jane.

=== Characters ===
The game features a number of characters whose names are taken from real American frontier figures, including Clay Allison, José Chávez y Chávez, Hoodoo Brown, Dave Rudabaugh, John Joshua "J.J" Webb, Luke Short, Major Thomas Magruder (who was most likely based on John B. Magruder), Soapy Jennings (who was based on Soapy Smith), and Magruder's hulking personal bodyguard, Dutchie, based on "Dutchy" Schunderberger, a member of the real-life Hoodoo Brown's Dodge City Gang. The name "Alhambra", given to the brothel in the game, comes from a former pleasure-castle of the Nasrid Kingdom of Granada.

- Colton "Cole" White (Thomas Jane) – The Apache protagonist and player character of the story. He learned the ways of the outdoors from his adoptive father, Ned White. Cole meets many characters during his adventure; some become his allies while others turn out to be the utmost of enemies. He is a skilled marksman, and is always willing to stand up for what he believes is right.
- Soapy Jennings (Dave Wittenberg) – A safe-cracker and a friend of Colton. Soapy's two specialties are cracking safes and cheating at poker, two major moral strikes against him in the American frontier. During the ride to Piper Lake from the Badlands, he confides to Cole the origin of his nickname: he was cornered in a lady friend's bedroom by her husband, and was forced to hide inside the shaft of her water closet – after which he had to scrub for three days before he could get the smell off of him.
- Major Thomas Magruder (Lance Henriksen) – The main antagonist of the story. He is the unofficial boss of the frontier, in charge of the railroads being installed through Apache Indian territory. Magruder was a Confederate States Army Major during the American Civil War (1861–1865) and led a group of soldiers, which included Clay Allison, to find the mythical city of gold, Quivira. The war ended, but Magruder's mission did not. He has made it his ultimate goal in life to find the lost city of gold and is willing to do anything to accomplish it. Magruder meets his end when he is crushed to death during a cave-in at his mine.
- Ned White (Kris Kristofferson) – Colton's adoptive father. He raised Colton under the false pretense of being his real father. Right before his death, he confesses part of the truth to Colton and sends him on his quest to find out the rest of the truth. Ned is a well-trained outdoorsman and makes his living selling animal skins and carcasses to the local riverboats sailing down the Missouri River.
- "Reverend" Josiah Reed (Brad Dourif) – A misogynistic and psychopathic priest who works for Magruder as a hired killer to take control of the area. He is eventually killed by Cole in retribution for murdering Jenny.
- Sergeant Hollister (Marc Graue) - The psychotic renegade army commander, who wields Ned's rifle and is in league with Magruder. After Hollister injures Fights-At-Dawn and battles with Colton, he dies when he fails to kill Colton via a suicide bombing with dynamite.
- Mayor Hoodoo Brown (Ron Perlman) – The fast-talking mayor of Empire City. Hoodoo takes orders from Thomas Magruder, although his true goal is to make his city great rather than simply earn money. Due to his dirty practices, Hoodoo has many enemies and therefore has hired two professional gunslingers, J.J. Webb and Dave Rudabaugh, as personal bodyguards. He himself is a skilled gunfighter. The mayor pretends to hire Colton as another bodyguard, but in fact intends to set him up and is later killed in a firefight with Cole.
- Clay Allison (Tom Skerritt) – A former Corporal for the Confederate Army and friend of Ned White and Tom Magruder. He is the leader of the resistance group fighting against Hoodoo Brown's corrupt reign over Empire City. He and his followers work closely with the Apache, dedicated to keeping Magruder and his men out of the frontier and restore some dignity to the American frontier.
- Fights-At-Dawn (Eric Schweig) – The Blackfoot Confederacy chief and a proud warrior. He is deeply concerned for the future of his tribe and saddened by the white man's arbitrary murder and theft. He befriends Colton, and recalls a time when Cole was younger, when he was attacked by a cougar.
- Many Wounds (Eric Schweig) – An Apache Indian who gave Colton to Ned when he was a baby. Later in the story, Many Wounds becomes a trusted ally of Colton and helps him out with Cole's fight against Magruder.
- Jenny (Kath Soucie) – A prostitute and the main attraction of the Alhambra Saloon in Dodge City. Jenny is tired of the small-town life and is anxiously waiting the completion of the bridge in town so she can travel south to New Mexico to Empire City. She briefly proves to be a valuable ally to Colton, but is murdered by Reed.

=== Plot ===
In 1880, Colton White and his father Ned are hunting game along the Missouri River. After Cole saves Ned from a grizzly bear, they board a riverboat to sell the meat. The riverboat is suddenly attacked by a psychopathic preacher named Reverend Josiah Reed and his men. After losing ground to Reed's men, Ned tells Cole to find a prostitute named Jenny in Dodge City, Kansas. Ned then reveals he is not Cole's real father, and pushes him over the side to save him from the steamboat's explosion. Cole travels to Dodge City to find Jenny. After rescuing her from a gang of bandits, Cole learns from her that Reverend Reed came to Dodge City from Empire City, and that Empire's Mayor Hoodoo Brown would know of the preacher's whereabouts. After assisting the sheriff in fixing the bridge to out of Dodge, Cole and Jenny travel to Empire City.

Upon arriving in Empire City, Colton is made a deputy by Hoodoo and promises to help him find Reed. During a gunfight at the local cattle ranch between the Resistance and the Deputies, Cole is appalled to see Hoodoo's other deputies kill an unarmed innocent couple. Cole then attempts to arrest the deputies but is forced to kill them both when they resist. When Cole confronts the Mayor in his casino back in Empire City, Hoodoo tells Cole that Reed has captured Jenny and is holding her in his office. Rushing to save her, Cole witnesses Reed murdering Jenny and is then quickly knocked unconscious by Hoodoo. Colton is then brought before Thomas Magruder, Reed and Hoodoo's boss, who had also ordered the Steamboat Massacre and Jenny's murder. After Cole learns Magruder and Ned have history, Magruder orders Colton to be hanged the next morning for Jenny's murder.

Cole is thrown into the Empire jail before his scheduled execution the next day. Here he meets Port, a member of the Resistance, and Soapy Jennings, a safe-cracker. With Soapy's help, Cole escapes jail and flees Empire with the other two prisoners. Soapy departs for Dodge while Port takes Cole to the Resistance's Hideout, where he meets their leader, Clay Allison. Cole later learns from Clay that he and Ned had served under Magruder during the American Civil War, and that the former Confederate Major was searching for Quivira, a lost city of gold, and that his ruthless quest had torn the frontier apart.

Clay takes Cole on a mission to destroy one of Magruder's trains, which they execute successfully. They also discover that the boxcar of the train is full of captured Apache, who Magruder had been using as slaves. The Apache Chief Many Wounds turns up at the scene, and thanks Cole for freeing his people, whilst criticising him for killing them at the bridge. As the Resistance celebrate at the hideout later that night, they are attacked by Magruder's men. They eventually manage to repel the attack but Clay is captured and taken to Empire City. Cole convinces Port and the rest of the Resistance to attack Empire, rescue their leader and take out Hoodoo. After battling his way through Empire to Hoodoo's fortification, Cole eventually rescues Clay from his prison and confronts the corrupt mayor, whom he eventually kills. With the city liberated from Magruder's control, Cole travels back to Dodge to find Soapy so they can crack a safe that Cole noticed on the steamboat. After Cole saves Soapy from a lynch mob, the pair escape Dodge and travel to the wreckage of the steamboat. However, the two are then captured by the renegade army commander Sergeant Hollister, who is revealed to be in league with Magruder. After escaping Hollister's fort, Cole and Soapy save the local Blackfoot Confederacy tribe from Hollister's soldiers. Cole then assists the tribe in attacking and capturing Hollister's Fort. Cole then travels up river, only to be attacked by Hollister, who now wields Ned's powerful rifle. After Cole wounds the psychotic sergeant heavily, Hollister then attempts to kill him via a suicide bombing, which he fails, killing only himself.

With Hollister dead, Cole and Soapy make their way to the riverboat, only to be ambushed by Magruder's riders. Cole defeats them, then they are attacked by Reed. After a long gunfight with the psychopathic preacher, Cole kills Reed in retribution for murdering Jenny and he and Soapy discover that the item Magruder had been hunting for is a part of the golden Cross of Coronado which shows the route to Quivira. Cole realizes that the other piece is held by Many Wounds, the Apache Chieftain. Cole and Soapy travel through the Badlands to the Apache Camp, where Many Wounds reveals that Cole is Apache. Many Wounds explains that his father and many other innocent villagers, were murdered by Magruder and his soldiers during their original search for the Cross of Coronado during the American Civil War. They are then once again ambushed by Magruder's men on their way to a mountain top Many Wounds told them of. Upon reaching the peak and using the Cross, they learn that Quivira is hidden inside a mountain, above where Magruder had been digging for it.

However, Magruder's militia discover their location, and attack them. Soapy is captured and tortured by Magruder, and is forced to reveal Quivira was above him all along. Magruder returns to his mine to find the City of Gold, while Cole fights his way down the mountain to save Soapy. Cole then kills Magruder's henchman Dutchie and his men, and captures Magruder's armored train. Clay and Cole then use the train to break into Magruder's Mine, which is then attacked by a joint force of Resistance fighters and Apache warriors. Fighting their way into the mines, Cole finally confronts Magruder inside Quivira. The two then furiously battle inside the Lost City, with Cole eventually overcoming the ruthless tyrant and causing the mountain to begin to collapse. Cole leaves Magruder with his leg trapped under a rock to be crushed by the crumbing mountain while he escapes the Lost City with the help of Many Wounds. Then, with Magruder dead and Quivira lost for good, Cole tells Many Wounds that their fathers can finally rest in peace.

== Development and marketing ==
Gun was marketed through the use of Last Call Poker — an alternate reality game from 42 Entertainment.

== Reception and sales ==
Reception

Aggregate scores
Aggregator	Score
GameRankings	79%
Metacritic	79/100

Review scores
Publication	Score
Eurogamer	7/10
GamePro	4.5/5
GameSpot	7.4 of 10
GameSpy	4/5
GameTrailers	7.6/10
IGN	8.0 of 10
Official Xbox Magazine (UK)	9/10
Official Xbox Magazine (US)	9.5/10
Play	8/10
X-Play	3/5

Gun received mostly positive reviews from critics, although the Xbox 360 version met positive to mediocre ratings. It holds aggregate scores of 79% and 79/100 at GameRankings and Metacritic respectively. IGN stated that "Neversoft has finally made a good game besides all their Tony Hawk". GameSpot described it as "initially a 19th-century Grand Theft Auto", while GameSpy addressed it as having "just about everything you could want from a game set in the Wild West". In its first month, the game sold 225,000 units across the four systems for which it was initially released. According to Toy Retail Survey Tracking (TRST) sales data, the game had sold over 1.4 million units in the U.S. by October 2008.

=== Awards ===
The game was highly acclaimed by many, and has scored high ratings and awards. GameSpy awarded it "Editor's Choice" and "Xbox 360 Action Game of the Year", saying that it "needs a sequel and fast". The game's protagonist was placed #7 on Game Informer's "Top 10 Heroes of 2005" list. At the 9th Annual Interactive Achievement Awards, Gun was nominated for "Outstanding Achievement in Original Musical Composition", "Outstanding Character Performance – Male", "Outstanding Character Performance – Female", and "Outstanding Achievement in Story and Character Development".

The editors of Computer Games Magazine presented Gun with their 2005 "Best Voice Acting" award. It was a finalist for PC Gamer US's "Best Action Game 2005" award, which ultimately went to F.E.A.R..

=== Boycott by Native Americans groups ===
The Association for American Indian Development declared a boycott of the game, claiming that it contains "derogatory, harmful, and inaccurate depictions of American Indians". Featured on the Association's boycott-specific website was a petition demanding that Activision clean up various aspects of the game before re-releasing it to retailers; the group called for a worldwide recall of the game if the revision was not completed. The site suggested that a game in which players were required to kill members of specific ethnic groups, like African Americans, Irish, Mexicans, or Jews would never be tolerated, "but apparently, killing Indians is still fair game". The site also mentioned events and revelations that take place later in the game's story, but assert that they do not address the problematic portions from earlier sections of the game.

On the now-defunct GamerGod.com website, contributor, Beth Dillon, concluded on January 31, 2006, that:

Even though the historical period portrayed in Gun was fraught with racism, Activision's decision to publish a racially stereotyped video game represents a serious misstep in social responsibility. Like Custer's Revenge, Gun provokes wonder. In this case, the industry has unfortunately bought into the popular misconception that games are frivolous because they are made for fun.

The game's publisher issued this brief statement:

Activision does not condone or advocate any of the atrocities that occurred in the American West during the 1800s. Gun was designed to reflect the harshness of life on the American frontier at that time. It was not Activision's intention to offend any race or ethnic group with Gun, and we apologize to any who might have been offended by the game's depiction of historical events which have been conveyed not only through video games but through films, television programming, books and other media.
