= Dodge City Gang =

From outpost on Santa Fe Trail East of Cimarron Cutoff

The Dodge City Gang were a group of Kansas gunfighters and gamblers who dominated the political and economic life of Las Vegas, New Mexico in 1879 and early 1880. This came at a time when Las Vegas was booming and was thought to be the future metropolis of New Mexico. As with many a boomtown, it attracted a number of opportunists and outlaws.

== Organization ==
The gang was composed largely of fighters from the recent Railroad Wars of Raton, New Mexico, and Royal Gorge, Colorado. These included John Joshua Webb, "Dirty" Dave Rudabaugh, and Mysterious Dave Mather. The gang was a loose-knit association, and its putative leader was Hyman Neill, better known as Hoodoo Brown, who had secured the position of justice of the peace. Doc Holliday was in town and was friendly with gang members, though he is not generally listed as a member.

The gang managed to get members or friends into local law enforcement positions, with the idea being, for the most part, that their actions were to control the gambling establishments and rake in huge profits. Some members, notably Dave Rudabaugh, seemed unsatisfied with this and were suspected of several stagecoach robberies and other criminal acts.

The town's rough reputation drew a number of lawless characters. Billy the Kid passed through in 1879, as did Jesse James, though neither was ever a part of the gang. A local legend has the two famous outlaws meeting for dinner in the Old Adobe Hotel in nearby Hot Springs, New Mexico. Supposedly Jesse invited Billy to come to Missouri and join his gang but the Kid declined. However, that is generally viewed as legend, and it is not confirmed that the two ever even met.

By the beginning of 1880 the tide of public opinion had turned against the gang. Webb was arrested after his involvement in a shooting that may well have been self defense, but much due to his association with the gang, he received a jail sentence. Rudabaugh was also jailed due to his involvement in criminal acts. Both he and Webb eventually escaped. Many other members of the organization left town. The power of the gang lasted only a matter of months. It was doomed by the greed and excesses of its members, and their inability to disguise their acts. The phrase "Dodge City Gang" can also be used to describe the informal group who dominated Dodge City, Kansas in the 1870s. At one time or another this group included Wyatt Earp, Bat Masterson, Doc Holliday, and Luke Short.
