= Hoodoo Brown =

American old west outlaw

- Born: Hyman G. Neill; Lexington, Missouri, U.S.
- Resting place: Lexington, Missouri (under the name Henry G. Neill)
- Other name: Henry G. Neill
- Occupations: Justice of the Peace, Coroner, Mayor, gambler
- Years active: 1870s–1880
- Known for: Leader of the Dodge City Gang
- Criminal charges: Murder, robbery, municipal corruption, seduction
- Accomplices: Dave Rudabaugh; J. J. Webb; Mysterious Dave Mather; Joe Carson

Hyman G. Neill, better known as Hoodoo Brown, was the leader of the Dodge City Gang in Las Vegas, New Mexico in 1879 and early 1880. According to Harold Thatcher, curator of the Rough Rider Museum in Las Vegas, Hoodoo was "the baddest cowboy of them all". He was described as tall and thin, with light hair, a rakish look, and a small moustache.

== Early life and background ==
Neill hailed from a traditional Southern family from Lexington, Missouri. His father had come to Lexington from Lee County, Virginia in the 1830s. Hyman's father, Henry Alexander Neill, practiced law and would have joined the Confederacy when the American Civil War began, however, he decided he could not disavow his oath to support the Constitution and ended up joining the Union. This choice, coupled with his wife's death, caused him to move his family to Warrensburg, Missouri after the war. His date of birth is possibly unknown.

Hoodoo became a printer's devil when he was a teenager, until one day he was asked to retrieve rags needed for printing. Young Neill jumped on a freight train going by the back door of the office, saying he was leaving to "get your durn rags".

In the year 1872 he was known to be a small-time gambler and confidence trickster. He eventually went to Colorado, working in silver mines with a friend. Hoodoo and his friend ended up in Mexico to form an opera company.

== Formation of the Dodge City Gang ==
When Hoodoo arrived in Las Vegas, New Mexico, he found it was developing a reputation as a lawless place, filled with outlaws, confidence tricksters, murderers and thieves. His displeasure with this led to his election as Justice of the Peace for East Las Vegas. He also served as coroner and mayor of the town, and recruited several former gunfighters from Kansas to form a police force. However, the force was as lawless as the criminals they were supposed to be policing. Called the "Dodge City Gang", the force included J. J. Webb, the town marshal, Mysterious Dave Mather, Joe Carson, "Dutchy" Schunderberger and Dave Rudabaugh.

== Dodge City Gang's achievements ==
From 1879 through 1880, Hoodoo led the Dodge City Gang on stagecoach and train robberies, murders, thievery and municipal corruption. Hoodoo's position as coroner enabled him to install the gang as the "Coroner's Jury", which they used to determine whether or not killings were in self-defense. This position enabled Hoodoo's gang to cover up most of their crimes.

== Arrest and disappearance ==
By the summer of 1880, the citizens of Las Vegas, New Mexico, had had enough of Hoodoo's corruption, and organized a team of vigilantes to overthrow the mayor. Hoodoo was not killed, but instead driven from the state. Historians have stated that Hoodoo stole money from a dead man before moving on to Houston, Texas.

Meanwhile, the widow of one of Hoodoo's deputies, who had been killed two months earlier, had exhumed her husband to move him to Houston. When she arrived, she found Hoodoo had been arrested. The widow visited Hoodoo in prison. The Parsons Sun reported that "the meeting between the pair is said to have been affecting in the extreme, and rather more affectionate than would be expected under the circumstances." The Parsons Eclipse, another newspaper added that Hoodoo's specific offense committed at Las Vegas was murder and robbery, and it was indicated that seduction and adultery was connected to the crime.

Soon thereafter, however, Hoodoo hired two local attorneys and was released when the attorneys managed to prove that the officers had no legal authority for holding Brown. Neither he nor the widow were ever seen again. The Chicago Times soon reported that Brown and the widow have been "skylarking through some of the interior towns of Kansas ever since".

== Reputed death and family ==
Reports from a descendant of Hyman G. Neill indicate that Hoodoo died in Torreón, Coahuila, Mexico, where he left a common-law wife and a son. Two of Hoodoo's brothers brought back his remains to Lexington. His son was also brought there, and was raised. Hoodoo Brown was buried at his family plot in Lexington under the name Henry G. Neill.

Years later, records listed a woman named Elizabeth Brown who was living in Leadville, Colorado. A heavy drinker, she claimed to have been married to a gambler named Hoodoo Brown, who was shot and killed in a gambling dispute. She may have been Hoodoo's common law wife, but this was never proven.

== In popular culture ==
In the 2005 video game Gun, Hoodoo Brown is shown as the mayor of fictional Empire City, New Mexico. He resembles the real-life Hoodoo in both appearance and character. In the game, Hoodoo deputizes the game's protagonist, Colton White, and agrees to help him find Josiah Reed, an assassin that masquerades as a preacher Colton is looking for. Colton soon finds out, however, that Hoodoo is on the same side as the assassin, and must escape Hoodoo's prison, later killing him. Dave Rudabaugh and J.J. Webb are also portrayed in the game as Hoodoo's deputies. Hoodoo is voiced by Ron Perlman in the game.

Brown also appears in two stories of the Italian comic Tex, episodes 601 and 602, as mayor of Vegas, New Mexico, and head of the Dodge City gang. When Tex Willer and his fellow ranger Kit Carson discover that Brown, with appointed sheriff Dave Mather and deputies of the town, among which John Joshua Webb and Dave Rudabaugh, as Dan Rudabaugh, participated in several robberies, they are involved in a duel, and Tex and Carson manage to kill Brown.

Hyman Neil appears in the Weird Western novel Merkabah Rider: The Mensch with No Name, by Edward M. Erdelac. He unofficially hires the Rider, Mysterious Dave Mather, and Doc Holliday to find two thousand dollars in cash stolen in a train robbery outside Las Vegas, New Mexico.

== See also ==
- List of fugitives from justice who disappeared

== Sources ==
- Hoodoo Brown - Leader of the Dodge City Gang
- Lost Las Vegas 14
- Las Vegas, New Mexico - The Outlaw and a Politician
