= Milton J. Yarberry =

American Old West lawman (1849–1883)

Milton J. Yarberry (c. 1849 – February 9, 1883) was an outlaw, gunman and lawman of the Old West, best known for having been the first Town Marshal for Albuquerque, New Mexico.

== Early life ==
Yarberry was born in Arkansas, to a family whose name was not Yarberry. He confessed this just prior to his death, to friend Elwood Maden, and that his family was respectable, and to protect them from the shame of the life he led, he would never reveal his true name, and, he never did. He also confessed to Maden that he'd been born in 1849, and that he had left his family's home after being involved in the killing of a man during a land dispute, after which he fled and changed his name. All of this is recorded in the book Deadly Dozen, written by author Robert K. DeArment. That book gives details about Yarberry, classifying him as one of the twelve least known but more dangerous gunmen of the Old West. Later research seems to indicate that he was, in reality, John Armstrong, and that he'd fled Sharp County, Arkansas wanted for murder. In 1873 he killed a man in Helena, Arkansas, fleeing once again.

Yarberry first appears in historical accounts while riding with outlaw Dave Rudabaugh and gunman "Mysterious Dave" Mather during the 1870s, beginning in 1873, operating mostly in southern Missouri and northern Arkansas. During this period, the three engaged in several robberies. When they were implicated in the murder of a prominent rancher in Arkansas, the three rode into Texas. The three separated, and Yarberry settled for a time in Texarkana, Arkansas, but in 1875 he killed a man there also, whom he suspected of being a bounty hunter. At that time, Yarberry's bounty for the Sharp County murder was $200.

He then entered Texas, and joined the Texas Rangers, serving in "Company B" of the "Frontier Battalion, stationed in Jack County, Texas. Accounts uncovered by Robert DeArment indicate that Yarberry served honorably with the Rangers during his brief service with them, and he departed in 1876, surfacing in Decatur, Texas under the name "John Johnson". He opened a saloon there, partnering with Bob Jones. However, when a bounty hunter came to Decatur, asking questions about Yarberry relating to the Sharp County murder, he sold out to his partner quickly and left town. The bounty hunter's body was found days later near Decatur.

Yarberry appeared shortly thereafter in Dodge City, Kansas, and by early 1878 he was in Canon City, Colorado. There he partnered with Tony Preston, opening a saloon and variety theater. Nineteenth-century performer Eddie Foy played there while Yarberry was part owner. Foy later wrote in his memoirs that Yarberry "fashioned himself a good violinist". When Foy and his partner, Jim Thompson, completed their engagement, Yarberry owed them several weeks pay. When they were not able to collect it entirely, Thompson stole a barrel of whiskey. Foy later wrote that he was surprised that his partner was this brave, as Yarberry was known to be a dangerous man.

On March 6, 1879, the bartender of another saloon shot Yarberry's partner Tony Preston, wounding him severely, though he would eventually recover. This man is unnamed and has been reported to be the bartender of Kirby's Saloon and confusingly also that of the Gem Saloon. Yarberry fired three shots as the man fled, missing, then joined a posse in pursuit. The man surrendered himself to the town marshal the next day, March 7th, explaining that he only ran because he was afraid of being lynched. Preston left Las Vegas shortly after, selling out to Yarberry.

A few months later, circa July 1879, Yarberry shipped his bar supplies to Las Vegas, New Mexico and departed Cañon City soon thereafter. Arriving in Las Vegas, New Mexico, he and a woman who was called Steamboat began operating another bar located on Center St, later known as Bridge St. Steamboat had been following the expansion of the railroad from Missouri all the way to Las Vegas, setting up shop at each new railhead camp or town. Some say Yarberry and Steamboat's establishment was also a brothel but there is no strong evidence that this was the case.

Selling his share in the establishment, Yarberry moved to San Marcial, New Mexico, where his former partner Tony Preston had now settled, still recovering from his wounds. Shortly after arriving, Yarberry became involved in an affair with Sadie Preston, Tony Preston's wife, although it is likely the affair had begun much earlier in Canon City. When Yarberry left San Marciel, Sadie Preston and her 4-year-old daughter went with him.

== Lawman career ==
Yarberry and Sadie Preston moved to Albuquerque, New Mexico, where he befriended Bernalillo County, New Mexico Sheriff Perfecto Armijo. With Armijo's support, Yarberry was appointed as Albuquerque's first Town Marshal in 1880. Yarberry quickly proved to be a very good lawman, and killed two men only a short time after accepting the position, during arrest situations. However, Harry A. Brown, a self-proclaimed gunman, drifted into town sometime around the beginning of 1881. In 1876, Brown had played a minor role in thwarting a robbery committed by Dave Rudabaugh and other riders, near Kinsley, Kansas. Although never known to have shot anyone, he bragged of how many men he'd killed, and quickly gained a reputation in Albuquerque as a heavy drinker, with a temper and a habit of pulling his gun with little provocation.

Sadie Preston and Brown became acquainted, and by February, 1881, the two were involved romantically. On the night of March 27, 1881, Brown and Sadie Preston were having dinner at Gerard's Restaurant. Yarberry was not aware that the two were involved, and Sadie had left her young daughter at home in his care, while she was out with Brown. John Clark, a coach driver, took the couple to the restaurant, and would be the only eyewitness to what happened next.

According to reports of the day, Brown and Sadie entered the restaurant, and shortly thereafter Yarberry appeared, walking up the street holding the hand of the young Preston daughter. Brown, evidently hearing that Yarberry was seen walking toward the restaurant, walked outside the doorway. Yarberry walked past him with the little girl in tow, took her inside, then a few minutes later he came back outside and began speaking with Brown. According to Clark the two became increasingly irate.

The two men walked to a nearby vacant lot, and continued arguing, during which time Brown repeatedly told Yarberry he was not afraid of him. Sadie Preston then appeared from the doorway of the restaurant, and called for Brown. Immediately, Brown hit Yarberry in the face, while at the same time Brown drew his pistol. Brown fired once, creasing Yarberry in the hand, at which point Yarberry drew his own pistol and shot Brown twice, in quick succession, in the chest. Brown died immediately.

Sheriff Armijo arrived shortly thereafter, and reluctantly took Yarberry into custody. Several witnesses testified in a preliminary hearing that Brown had repeatedly announced publicly that he intended to kill Yarberry, and due to this as well as Brown having fired first, Yarberry was cleared on the grounds of self defense. For unknown reasons, several prominent people in town expressed dissatisfaction with the results of the hearing, and called for a Grand Jury indictment, which did convene in May, 1881. Yarberry's attorney, S.M. Barnes, produced a parade of witnesses on Yarberry's behalf, and on May 19, 1881, Yarberry was acquitted.

However, less than a month after the acquittal, Yarberry killed again. On June 18, 1881, Yarberry sat on the front porch of his friend Elwood Maden's home, conversing with gambler Monte Frank Boyd. As they talked, a shot was heard coming from the direction of the R.H. Greenleaf Restaurant, and both Yarberry and Boyd ran to that location. What happened next is confusing, as no one was quite certain. Yarberry asked a bystander who fired the shot, to which the bystander indicated by pointing at a man who was walking away. Yarberry called to him, telling him to halt, he wanted to speak with him. Within seconds, three shots were fired, and Charles D. Campbell lay dead.

Sheriff Armijo arrested both Yarberry and Boyd for the shooting. Yarberry claimed that Campbell, who was not known to Yarberry but who had a reputation as someone who drank too often, had turned toward him with a gun, and thus he fired in self-defense. One of his bullet wounds was in the back, but Yarberry claimed that the bullet in the back had to have come from when Campbell's body spun after being hit in the front. Campbell was armed, but no one could testify that his gun was out when he was shot. Again Yarberry, as well as Boyd who fired at least two rounds, was cleared in a preliminary hearing. This led to a loud public outcry, despite evidence at the time indicating that Yarberry had acted in good faith, in self-defense.

Boyd left town, heading to Arizona, where he is alleged to have been killed by Navajo Indians the following year. Yarberry was again jailed, with anticipation of another Grand Jury hearing. On May 11, 1882, a Grand Jury indicted Yarberry for the murder of Campbell. The New Mexico Governor Lionel Sheldon, having newly taken office, and doing so in a time when news stories of Billy the Kid and John Kinney were rampant, was intent on making an example out of Yarberry.

The New Mexico Attorney General, William Breedon, handled the case for the prosecution, assisted by Arnet R. Owen. For the defense, Yarberry was represented by Jose Francisco Chavez, I.S. Trimble, and John H. Knaebel. Witness Thomas A. Parks, an attorney from Platt City, Nebraska, brought forth the most damaging testimony, when he stated he saw the entire event, and stated further that he saw no gun in Campbell's hands. Campbell's pistol that he had in his possession had been fired, and Yarberry claimed he'd fired it at least once at him. No one could counter this, aside from Parks, who claimed this was false. Yarberry also claimed he had fired only one time, hitting Campbell in the front. Yarberry stated adamantly that he shot Campbell because Campbell tried to shoot him, and he never varied from that.

The trial lasted three days, after which Yarberry was convicted and sentenced to hang. Yarberry insisted he had been "railroaded", and that he had acted correctly and in self-defense. On September 9, 1882, Yarberry and three others escaped from the Santa Fe, New Mexico jail, and he quickly found that a $500 bounty had been placed on him. The other prisoners were captured quickly, and Santa Fe County Sheriff Romulo Martinez organized a posse to hunt down Yarberry.

On September 12, 1882, a posse led by Santa Fe Police Chief Frank Chavez captured Yarberry twenty eight miles outside of town. Five months later his appeal was denied. Attorney John Knaebel filed appeals and sent letters all the way to Washington, D.C., insisting his client was innocent of murder, but to no avail. In his final interview, Yarberry was told by the reporter that he looked pale, to which he replied, "Maybe. But I ain't sick, and I ain't scared either."

On February 9, 1883, under a guard provided by order of the governor, made up of the "Governor's Rifles", a New Mexico militia, Yarberry was marched to the gallows. His close friend, Sheriff Perfecto Armijo, was tasked with pulling the lever to hang him. Sheriff Armijo had staunchly supported Yarberry throughout the process, and also insisted he was being hanged unjustly. Yarberry requested that Colfax County Sheriff Mason T. Bowman take Sheriff Armijo's place, to save his friend from the task, but Sheriff Bowman declined. Over 1,500 people were in attendance to watch the hanging. As Sheriff Armijo pulled the lever, Yarberry proclaimed, "Gentlemen, you are hanging an innocent man."

After his death, Yarberry's supporters in Albuquerque continued to state, often publicly, that he was unlawfully and wrongfully condemned. Sheriff Armijo never wavered from his support of Yarberry. Many claimed that Yarberry was only convicted due to the more powerful and well-to-do citizens of Albuquerque believing that he hurt the reputation of the town, simply due to the fact that he was involved in numerous shootings. Sheriff Armijo claimed that whether innocent or not, it mattered little to the prominent people of the town, who were more concerned with the town's image.
