= Dave Rudabaugh =

American cowboy, outlaw and gunman (1854–1886)

- Born: David Rudabaugh; July 14, 1854; Fulton County, Illinois, U.S.
- Died: February 18, 1886 (aged 31); Parral, Chihuahua, Mexico
- Cause of death: Gunshot wound
- Occupations: Cattle rustler; train/stagecoach robber; cowboy
- Years active: 1870–1886

David Rudabaugh (July 14, 1854 – February 18, 1886), posthumously nicknamed "Dirty Dave" or "Arkansas Dave", was an American cowboy, outlaw and gunfighter in the American frontier. It is a popular myth that he was known as Dirty Dave because he rarely bathed and wore dirty clothes. In fact, there is no indication he was ever referred to as such during his lifetime, and there are no contemporary sources known to have criticized his hygiene. Furthermore, the sobriquet “Arkansas Dave” was fabricated entirely by film writer John Fusco for the Young Guns 2 (1990) screenplay, because he “thought it sounded good”.

== Early life ==
Rudabaugh was born in Fulton County, Illinois. His father was killed in the Civil War when Dave was a boy. The family moved to Ohio and later Kansas.

== Outlaw ==
The outlaw career of Dave Rudabaugh began in earnest in Arkansas in the early 1870s. He was part of a band of outlaws who robbed and participated in cattle rustling along with Milton Yarberry and Mysterious Dave Mather. The three were suspected in the death of a rancher and fled the state. By some accounts all three went to Decatur, Texas, but other accounts have Rudabaugh heading to the Black Hills of South Dakota, where he became a stagecoach robber.

== The Trio ==
Sometime around 1876, Rudabaugh joined Mike Roarke and Dan Dement to form the outlaw band known as the "Trio". There is a disputed story from around this time that Rudabaugh taught Doc Holliday to use a pistol while Doc taught him the finer points of playing cards.

In October 1876, Rudabaugh robbed a Santa Fe Railroad construction camp and fled south. Wyatt Earp was issued a temporary commission as Deputy U.S. Marshal and he left Dodge City, following Rudabaugh over 400 miles (640 km) towards Fort Griffin, Texas. Rudabaugh arrived at the frontier town on the Clear Fork of the Brazos River ahead of Earp by just a few days. When Earp arrived, he walked into the Shanssey Saloon, the largest saloon in town, which was owned by John Shanssey, whom Earp had known since he was 21. Shanssey told Earp that Rudabaugh had passed through town earlier in the week, but he didn't know where he was headed. Shanssey suggested Earp ask gambler "Doc" Holliday, who had played cards with Rudabaugh. It was the first conversation in a long friendship between Earp and Holliday. Holliday said he thought Rudabaugh was headed back towards Kansas, and Earp telegraphed the new information to Bat Masterson, which led to Rudabaugh's later capture.

== Capture and release ==
Rudabaugh's gang attempted their first train robbery, on January 22, 1878, near Kinsley, Kansas. The robbery was a complete failure, and they came away empty-handed. The next day, a posse led by Bat Masterson, including John Joshua Webb, captured Rudabaugh and fellow gang member Ed West. The remaining members of the gang were captured shortly thereafter. Rudabaugh took a deal for immunity offered by the prosecuting attorney, and testified against his former gang members.

Shortly following his release, Rudabaugh accepted Masterson's offer to join a group of gunfighters to fight for the Atchison, Topeka and Santa Fe Railway in the Railroad Wars.

== Dodge City Gang ==
During this time he became a very close associate of John Joshua Webb, whom he had met during his earlier arrest. After the railroad wars, he and Webb traveled to the town of Las Vegas, New Mexico, where they became important members of the Dodge City Gang. This gang was a band of ruffians and gamblers who were dominating the political and economic life of the growing community. The leader was Hyman G. Neill (aka Hoodoo Brown). Webb was arrested for murder in the spring of 1880. Dave Rudabaugh and another gang member attempted to break him out of jail on April 5, 1880. The attempt failed, and Rudabaugh shot and killed deputy sherriff Antonio Lino Valdez in the process.

== The Rustlers and capture ==
He fled to Fort Sumner, New Mexico, where he eventually joined a gang, one of whose members was Billy the Kid.

At Stinking Springs (near present-day Taiban, New Mexico), On December 23, 1880 a posse led by Pat Garrett captured Rudabaugh, Billy the Kid, Billy Wilson, and other members of the gang. They were taken to Las Vegas, but the danger of a lynch mob prompted the officers to move them to Santa Fe. In February 1881, while in court, Rudabaugh pleaded guilty and was sentenced to 99 years in prison for several counts of mail robbery. He was then found guilty for the murder of Las Vegas deputy Lino Valdez and was sentenced to death by hanging.

== Imprisonment and escape ==
Rudabaugh was reunited with Webb in jail. After a botched escape attempt in which a fellow prisoner named Thomas Duffy died, he and Webb broke out. Rudabaugh fled to Arizona where he joined the Clanton faction in their feud against the Earps. He may have participated in the murder of Morgan Earp and the attempted murder of Virgil Earp and may also have been present at the gunfight at Iron Springs in which Curly Bill Brocius was killed.

== Death ==
As the Clanton gang broke up, Rudabaugh headed down to Mexico where he worked as both a cowboy and a rustler. On February 18, 1886, Rudabaugh was involved in a gunfight with locals in Parral, Chihuahua. The fight began over a card game. He drew his pistol and killed two men and wounded another. He left the saloon unharmed, but unable to find his horse, he re-entered a few moments later and was shot several times and died. Rudabaugh's body was then decapitated with a machete and his head placed on a pole. Legend says he belonged to the Soapy Smith Denver gang and was killed near Cripple Creek, Colorado in a miners' riot.

== Other information ==
Dave Rudabaugh was said to be the only outlaw who crossed paths with Mysterious Dave Mather, Bat Masterson, Pat Garrett, Wyatt Earp, Billy the Kid, Doc Holliday, Milton J. Yarberry, and John Joshua Webb.

== See also ==
- List of unsolved murders

== In popular culture ==
- Rudabaugh is a character in the 1951 film The Texas Rangers. The fictional tale has him and real-life outlaws Sam Bass, John Wesley Hardin, Butch Cassidy and The Sundance Kid forming a gang, then squaring off against two convicts recruited by John B. Jones to bring them to justice.
- Rudabaugh is a character in the 1959 film The Gunfight at Dodge City. In this mostly fictional tale, Rudabaugh is portrayed as the assassin of Bat Masterson's brother Ed Masterson, and additionally is killed in a gunfight after assaulting Lily, the saloon owner of the Lady Gay. Both of these events are fictional.
- Wyatt Earp first meets Doc Holliday while Wyatt is hunting Dave Rudabaugh, in the tv series "The Life and Legend of Wyatt Earp", in 1957 (Season 2/Episode 33) "Wyatt Meets Doc Holliday".
- Wyatt Earp first meets Doc Holliday while Wyatt is hunting Rudabaugh, in the movie Wyatt Earp.
- Dave Rudabaugh was played by Christian Slater in the 1990 film Young Guns II. In the film the character is known as "Arkansas Dave" though the historical Rudabaugh never used this name. He is portrayed as arrogant and preoccupied with his own notoriety and rank, often arguing with Billy over the leadership of the gang. The movie states that Rudabaugh was beheaded as a warning to other outlaws crossing the Mexican border.
- A song called the "Ballad of Arkansas Dave Rudabaugh", is on Pat Green's 1997 album George's Bar. The events in the song bear no similarity to the actual events of Rudabaugh's life.
- He appears, as "Dan" Rudabaugh, in Tex episodes 601 and 602 along with Mysterious Dave Mather, Hoodoo Brown and John Joshua Webb.
- A song called "Arkansas Dave", on George Strait's 2009 album Twang. The song is part fiction, but depicts Dave's documented death. The song was written by George's son Bubba Strait.
- Dave Rudabaugh appears as a character in the weird western novel Merkabah Rider: The Mensch With No Name (by Edward M. Erdelac, 2010, ISBN 978-1-61572-190-0). He robs the titular character of his signature Volcanic pistol during a train holdup.
- Dave Rudabaugh is the name of a character in the video game Gun.
- Dave Rudabaugh is portrayed by Chad Dashnaw in the film The Kid directed by Vincent D'Onofrio.
