= Perfecto Armijo =

New Mexico militia colonel (1845–1913)

- Born: February 20, 1845; Ranches of Albuquerque
- Died: September 23, 1913 (aged 68); Albuquerque

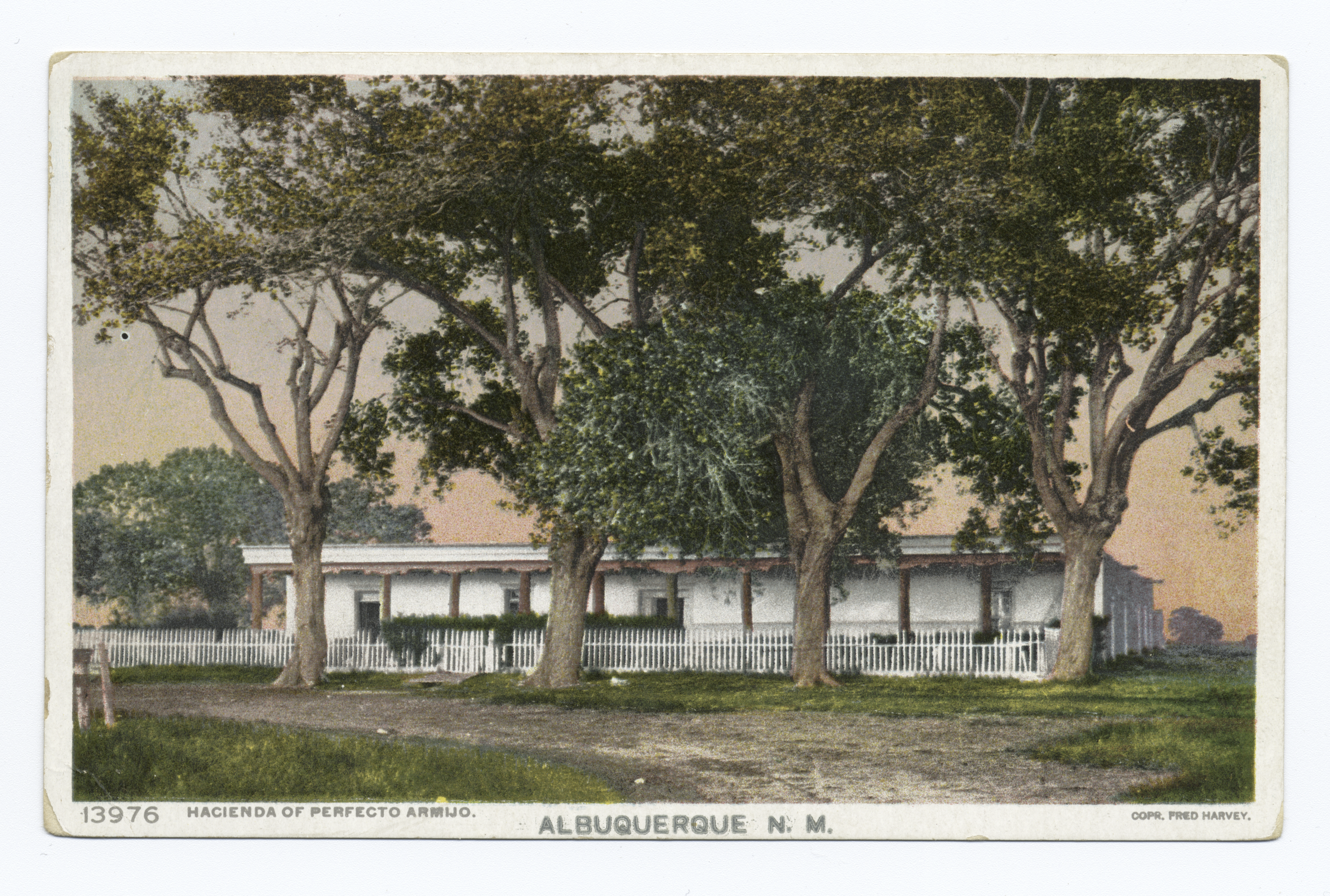
Hacienda of Perfecto Armijo, Albuquerque

Perfecto Armijo (February 20, 1845 – September 23, 1913) was a native of New Mexico, where he became frontier trader, store owner, probate judge, county sheriff, alderman, county treasurer and rancher. He was also a Civil War colonel in the New Mexico militia. In Albuquerque, he befriended gunman Milton J. Yarberry, hired him as a county deputy, and helped him to gain an appointment as first town marshal. However, he was later forced to hang Yarberry for charges of murder, though he continued to plea his innocence, stating that "Yarberry should have been rewarded instead of punished" for the killings.

== George B. Anderson, History of New Mexico: Its Resources and People (1907) Vol. 2 ==
Colonel Perfecto Armijo, sheriff of Albuquerque, is a son of Ambrosia Armijo, who was born at Ranches of Albuquerque. He was probate judge for many years and served as a colonel of the militia during the Civil war. Prominent in public life, he was treasurer of the county at the time of his death, which occurred in 1884. His political allegiance was given the Republican party. He married Candelario Otero, a daughter of Vicente Otero.

Colonel Perfecto Armijo was born in Valencia county, New Mexico, February 20, 1845, and supplemented his preliminary education by four years' study in St. Louis University, being a student there at the time of the outbreak of the Civil war. He was active in various military drills there with the boys at school, but did not enlist. About 1862 he returned to New Mexico, and for a number of years engaged in freighting to Leavenworth, Kansas City, Chihuahua, El Paso, Tucson, Prescott and other points, during which time he had much trouble with the Indians, who were numerous upon the frontier and committed many depredations against the white settlers, who were trying to found homes and engage in business in this part of the country. At Las Cruces, he established a store in connection with his brother, Jesus Armijo. Later he freighted again until 1880, when the railroad was built, and rendering his business unremunerative, he sold his teams and other paraphernalia of the freighting outfits. At that time he turned his attention to merchandising in Old Albuquerque, where he conducted business for several years. He was appointed sheriff of the county and served for one year, after which he was elected on the Republican ticket to the office of sheriff of the county. He was also alderman of Albuquerque and was a delegate to the last convention. On September 1, 1905, he was appointed sheriff to succeed Thomas S. Hubbell, and after a hard contest, which is now historic, gained the office.

Colonel Armijo was married in 1868 to Miss Febronia Garcia, a daughter of Pedro Garcia, of Doña Ana county. They had nine children, two of whom have died. The living are Victoriano, the wife of Captain A. W. Kimball, quartermaster at Fort Snelling, Minnesota; David, of the City of Mexico; Candelario, the wife of Alfredo Otero; Solomon, a resident of Colorado; Chonah and Perfecto, both at home, and Juanita, the wife of Dr. Rogers Haynes, at El Vado, New Mexico.

Perfecto Armijo died in Albuquerque on September 23, 1913.
