= Railroad Wars =

Historical rivalries between railroad companies in the United States

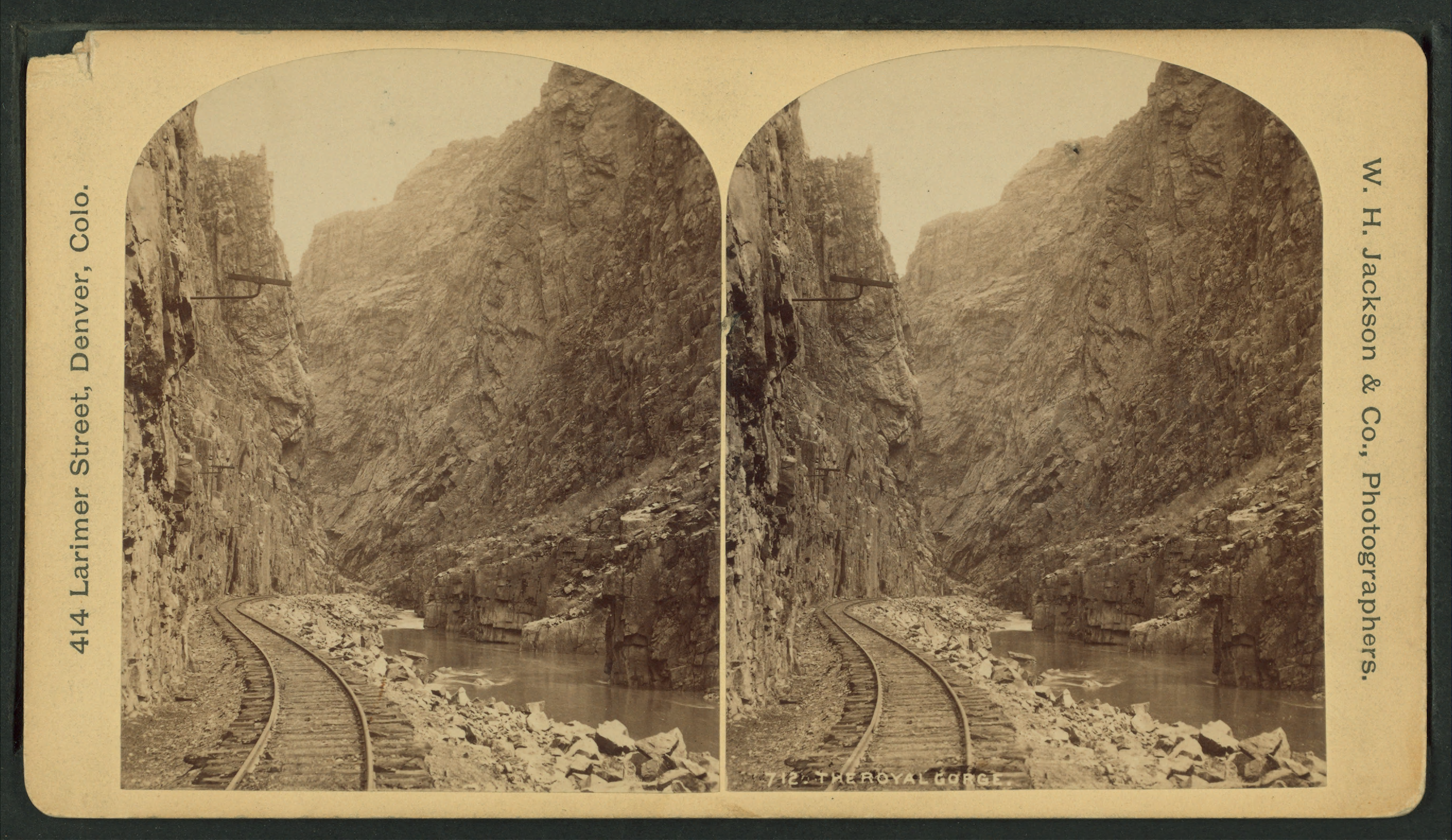
- The Royal Gorge in 1886 Colorado. Competition to build a line through the Royal Gorge resulted in a railroad war in the late 1870s.
- Date: 1864-1912
- Location: United States
- Participants: Denver and Rio Grande Western Railroad, Atchison, Topeka and Santa Fe Railway, Central Pacific Railroad, Sacramento Valley Railroad, Rock Island Railroad, Deschutes Railroad and the Oregon Trunk Railway

Railroad Wars were business rivalries between railroad companies, which occurred frequently in American history. Although they were usually little more than legal disputes inside a courtroom, they sometimes turned into armed conflicts. There has been competition between railroad companies since the beginning of railroading in the United States, but violent confrontations were most common in the final quarter of the 19th century, particularly in the Old West.

== Wars ==
=== Placer County Railroad War ===
One of the first railroad wars in Old West history was the Placer County Railroad War in California. In 1864, the Sacramento Valley Railroad and the Central Pacific Railroad began competing for the ownership of a road from Ashland to a point just outside Auburn Station, which was in the process of being abandoned by the Sacramento, Placer and Nevada Railroad. Because the Sacramento Valley company was in need of American-made rail for use in the First transcontinental railroad, the abandonment of the Sacramento, Placer and Nevada road gave them an opportunity to purchase new rail cheaply. To the contrary, the Central Pacific was interested in completing the road to Auburn.

In order to stop the destruction of the road by the Sacramento Valley Railroad, Central Pacific convinced a local Welshman named Griffith Griffith, who owned a granite quarry along the road, to sue the former for threatening his business. Griffith was successful and on June 15, 1864, he received a court order to stop the destruction of the road. The Sacramento Valley company ignored the order though and on July 2 they began disassembling the road for use elsewhere.

In response, the sheriff of Placer County assembled his deputies and arrested some railroad workers at Auburn Station. However, on July 9, the disassembling of the road was resumed so the deputies attempted to stop it again. But, before they were successful, the Justice of Lincoln arrived and arrested the deputies for disturbing the peace. When he learned of this, the sheriff of Placer County ordered the Auburn Greys, a local militia, to pick up where his deputies had left off. During the following encounter, the militia opened fire on a crew of workers as they were removing the tracks. Others were arrested and put in jail. The road was safe for the time being, but, soon after, the California Supreme Court got involved and sided with the Sacramento Valley Railroad. Now that the Sacramento Valley company had permission from the state to continue removing the road, the Central Pacific was forced to build their own line to Auburn, which was completed on May 13, 1865.

=== Colorado Railroad War ===
The Colorado Railroad War, also known as the Royal Gorge Railroad War or simply "The Canyon War", was fought in the late 1870s between the Atchison, Topeka & Santa Fe Railway Company (AT&SF) and the smaller Denver & Rio Grande Railroad (D&RG). In 1878, the AT&SF was competing against the D&RG to put the first line through Raton Pass. Both railroads had extended lines into Trinidad, Colorado and the pass was the only access to continue on to New Mexico. There was a great deal of legal maneuvering, and even threatened violence between rival gangs of railroad workers. To break the impasse, AT&SF hired a number of local gunfighters in February 1878. Faced with this threat, and running out of money, the D&RG was forced to cede the pass to its rivals. The initial dispute was over without a shot being fired. However, the next year a silver strike in Leadville brought the struggle back to life.

Now both railroads were competing to put track along the narrow Royal Gorge. The D&RG had hired its own gunfighters so the AT&SF decided to strengthen its forces. On March 20, 1879, the railroad hired Bat Masterson to put together a group of gunmen. Masterson's force included such famous fighters as Doc Holliday, Ben Thompson, Dave Rudabaugh and Mysterious Dave Mather, as well as about seventy others. This impressive force had great success through early June 1879, but, on June 10, the state Fourth Judicial Circuit, with the later concurrence of the federal courts, ruled in favor of the D&RG, changing matters entirely. With the assistance of the sheriffs in the counties through which the railroads passed, the Denver and Rio Grande mounted an attack on its rival's forces. There was heavy fighting at the Santa Fe's garrisons in Colorado. The garrisons in Denver and Colorado Springs fell quickly. Masterson's headquarters in Pueblo held out the longest, but they eventually conceded defeat. Later, there were some bloodless skirmishes, but the war was essentially over with the Denver and Rio Grande in control of the Royal Gorge.

=== Enid-Pond Creek Railroad War ===
The Enid-Pond Creek Railroad War was a dispute between the citizens of two Oklahoma counties and the Rock Island Railroad. In the late 1880s, the Rock Island Railroad built a line into the Indian Territory, entering near Caldwell, Kansas and following the Chisholm Trail. As part of the infrastructure, the company established railroad stations near several of the existing stagecoach stations along the trail. Two of the stations, Pond Creek, built at Pond Stage Stand on Round Pond Creek, and Enid, built at Skeleton Station near the Skeleton Ranch headquarters, would become involved in a controversy between the railroad and the United States Department of the Interior.

The problems began when the Department of the Interior set about opening the Cherokee Outlet to settlement. Hoping to lessen the problem of county seat wars, a common event in newly settled areas of the Old West, the Department of the Interior divided the Cherokee Outlet into counties and assigned them county seats. Pond Creek was chosen as the seat of "L" County and Enid became the seat of "O" County. Following the announcement of the official county seats, several Cherokee citizens began claiming land allotments, choosing sites near Pond Creek and Enid. Subsequently, railroad officials were accused of conspiring with the Cherokee to speculate on town development. Accordingly, officials in the Department of the Interior moved the government approved towns to different locations nearby, effectively creating two new towns.

A land run opened the Cherokee Outlet in 1893 and settlers, mostly from Kansas, occupied all four town sites; railroad Pond Creek, government Pond Creek, railroad Enid, or North Enid, and government Enid, or South Enid. The Rock Island Railroad responded to the government's action by refusing to stop trains at the government towns. Initially, the citizens in both government towns protested to get the railroad to provide them service and the Oklahoma Territorial government and United States House of Representatives supported them. However, the United States Senate took the railroad's side and refused to act. Government officials then informed the Rock Island Railroad that they had to furnish mail service to the two government towns. The Rock Island company responded by installing a type of hook on their trains to pick up and deliver mail without having to slow down. When the mail pouches broke open, furious citizens claimed it was done intentionally. The people of Enid then passed an ordinance setting a speed limit for trains passing through the town, but the Rock Island Railroad ignored it.

Citizens in both government towns attempted to flag down trains or force them to stop by placing dummies on the tracks and leaving wagons and debris across the rails. When that failed, the citizens resorted to violence. In June 1894, the people of Pond Creek tore up about a hundred yards of railroad and wrecked a freight train. By July, citizens were shooting at passing trains and placing bombs on the railroad tracks. Later that month, a group of unknown assailants sawed partially through a number of wooden supports on the trestle near Enid, which led to the wrecking of another freight train.

To restore order, men of the United States Marshals Service and United States Army troops from Fort Reno and Fort Supply were sent in to patrol the railroad right-of-way. Violence continued, though. Finally, the United States Senate decided to intervene and on August 8, 1894, President Grover Cleveland signed an act which required railroads "to establish and maintain passenger stations and freight depots at or within one-fourth of a mile of the boundary limits of all town sites established prior to August 8, 1894, in said Territories." Soon after, railroad Pond Creek was renamed Jefferson and relocated to higher ground; government Pond Creek remained, but "L" County was eventually renamed Grant County and the seat was moved to Medford. Railroad Enid became North Enid and government Enid, or South Enid, became the present-day Enid, the seat of Garfield County.

=== Deschutes Railroad War ===
The Deschutes Railroad War began in 1908 when two competing railroad companies, the Deschutes Railroad and the Oregon Trunk Railway, started racing to build a line from the mouth of the Deschutes River across central Oregon. The Deschutes Railroad, a Union Pacific subsidiary, was owned by Edward H. Harriman and the Oregon Trunk was owned by James J. Hill.

Harriman was the first to begin construction and, after surveying the area, he decided that the eastern side of the river would be the best route. Soon after, Hill began building his own line on the western side. Later on, however, in the Deschutes River Canyon, the two roads actually ran side-by-side or shared the same rails and terminals. Over the following years, there were multiple legal disputes to decide which company should have sole access to the canyon, but railroad workers went even further. Competing construction crews would often blow up the other side's supplies by igniting their black powder stores. They also dumped boulders onto camps below and engaged in small gunfights. Casualties remained light though and by 1912 the two railroads were operating on mostly separate lines, thus removing the cause for hostility.

== See also ==
- Erie Gauge War
- Frog war
- 1903 Nevada railroad war
- Sheep Wars
- Coal Wars
