= John Joshua Webb =

American lawman and outlaw (1847-1882)

John Joshua Webb (February 14, 1847 – April 12, 1882) was a noted lawman turned gunfighter and outlaw of the American frontier.

== Early life ==
Webb was born February 14, 1847, in Keokuk County, Iowa, the seventh of twelve children born to William Webb Jr and Innocent Blue Brown Webb. Webb moved about often in his youth. The family moved to Nebraska in 1862, and later to Osage City, Kansas. Webb headed west on his own in 1871, working as a buffalo hunter and miner along the way.

== Gunfighter ==
Webb drifted to Dodge City, Kansas, where he came into contact with several notable personalities of the old west, including Wyatt Earp and Bat Masterson. While there, he took part as a member of several posses and served as a deputy. By January 1878, Bat Masterson was the newly appointed sheriff of Ford County. Masterson deputized Webb and two others, Kinch Riley and Dave "Prairie Dog" Morrow, to track down outlaws who had robbed a train.

One of those outlaws was Dave Rudabaugh. The deputies caught up with the outlaws and, during the arrest, Rudabaugh went for his gun but was overwhelmed by Webb and disarmed. Rudabaugh informed on his cohorts, and they received prison sentences, whereas he was later released.

In September 1878, exaggerated reports of Cheyenne raids on the populace prompted the government to send firearms to Dodge City to be used for self-defense by the citizens. Army Lt. Colonel William Henry Lewis selected Webb, Bill Tilghman, and others to serve as Army scouts.

In 1879, Webb was selected to serve as a hired gun by Bat Masterson during the fight for the Atchison, Topeka and Santa Fe Railway during the Railroad Wars in Royal Gorge Colorado. He moved on from there to Las Vegas, New Mexico, joining Dave Mather, Doc Holliday and others. Shortly after arriving there, he partnered with Doc Holliday in running a saloon, where Doc spent most of his time gambling.

In 1880, Webb was appointed town marshal of Las Vegas, New Mexico. Soon afterwards he was made a member of the Dodge City Gang, led by Justice of the Peace Hoodoo Brown. The gang participated in several train and stage coach robberies and were alleged to have taken part in lynchings and murders.

== Arrest for murder, jailbreak ==
On March 2, 1880, Webb and a deputy entered the Goodlet and Roberts Saloon in Las Vegas, where they observed a man named Michael Killiher, armed with a holstered pistol. When ordered to relinquish the pistol, Killiher refused. He then drew his pistol, but Webb quickly drew his own pistol and shot Killiher three times, twice in the chest and once in the head, killing him. Although seemingly justified, rumors quickly spread that JOP Hyman Niell had information that Killiher (a freighter by trade) had in his possession $1,900, and he had sent Webb to take it from him.

Whether this was true was never verified, but Webb was arrested for the shooting. He was shortly afterwards convicted of murder and sentenced to hang. It was likely that the general dislike of the Dodge City Gang weighed more on his conviction than his actual guilt in this particular instance. However, on April 30, 1880, Dave Rudabaugh and a man named John Allen burst into the jail to free Webb. The jailbreak was unsuccessful, but Rudabaugh shot and killed the jailer, Antonio Lino Valdez. Rudabaugh escaped capture but was later arrested, while working with Billy the Kid, on December 23, 1880. Webb's sentence was later commuted to life in prison, and he and Rudabaugh were held together in prison.

Determined to escape, Rudabaugh, Webb and two other men named Thomas Duffy and H. S. Wilson, attempted to shoot their way out again on September 19, 1881, but again they were unsuccessful, and Duffy was killed by lawmen. Two months later, Rudabaugh, Webb and five others chipped rocks from the jail wall and successfully escaped.

Rudabaugh and Webb fled to Texas, then on to Mexico, where they separated. Rudabaugh was killed shortly afterwards. Webb drifted, changing his name to "Samuel King" and working for the railroad, eventually moving to Winslow, Arkansas, where he died of smallpox on April 12, 1882.

== Bibliography ==
- DeMattos, Jack. "Gunfighters of the Real West: John Joshua Webb." Real West, April 1981.
- Snell, Joseph W. "Wretched Webb." Frontier Times, March 1973.
