= Mysterious Dave Mather =

Old West American sheriff

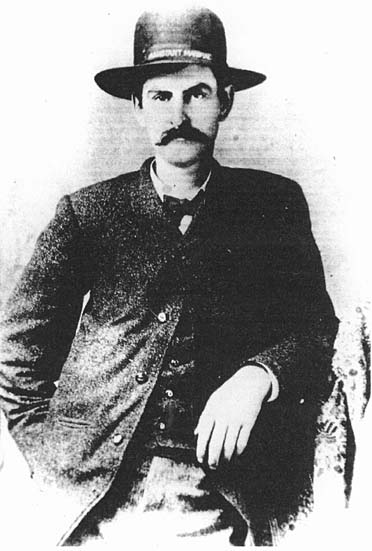
- David Allen "Mysterious Dave" Mather posed for his only known photograph sometime during his term as Assistant Marshal of Dodge City (June 1, 1883 – April 10, 1884)
- Born: David Allen Mather; August 10, 1851; Saybrook, Connecticut, U.S.
- Died: between June 2, 1885 and Oct. 1887 (aged 33–36); Possibly Texas
- Occupations: Lawman; buffalo hunter; hired gun
- Years active: 1870s–1885

David Allen Mather (August 10, 1851 – unknown), also known by the nickname "Mysterious Dave," was an American lawman, gunfighter, and occasional criminal in the Old West. His taciturn personality may have earned him the nickname "Mysterious Dave". Mather served as a lawman in Dodge City, Kansas, and East Las Vegas, New Mexico Territory. He disappeared in 1885 and his precise fate is unknown.

== Early life ==
Mather was born in Deep River, Connecticut (then Saybrook, Connecticut), on August 10, 1851, the first son of Captain Ulysses W. Mather and Lydia Mather (née Wright). He had two younger brothers, Josiah Wright Mather (October 11, 1854 – April 15, 1932) and George Conway Mather (1855–1856). He claimed to have been descended from the famous minister Cotton Mather, but research on the lineage of Cotton Mather performed by his descendent, Horace E. Mather, indicates that this claim was likely incorrect. His father abandoned the family in 1856, and was later murdered in Shanghai aboard his ship, the Ellen, on September 13, 1864. The news of his death did not reach Connecticut until two months later, when reports were printed in the Hartford press.

By 1860, Mather was living with his maternal grandfather, Josiah Wright. By 1870, he was living as a boarder with a cousin while working as a laborer. That same year, Mather and his brother Josiah (then 19 and 15, respectively) went to nearby Clinton and signed on as part of the crew of a cargo ship, eventually making their way to New Orleans, Louisiana.

== Life in the Wild West ==
Mather's exact whereabouts during his earliest years in the American West are uncertain. He was in Dodge City, Kansas, in 1872, where he and his brother Josiah may have reunited and become buffalo hunters.

=== Royal Gorge Railroad War ===
The first documented evidence of Mather's career occurred in 1879, when he was recruited by lawman Bat Masterson to serve in a posse to enforce the claims of the Atchison, Topeka and Santa Fe Railway during the Royal Gorge Railroad War. The posse was never called to action as the "war" was settled in court.

=== Lawman in East Las Vegas, New Mexico ===
Mather relocated to East Las Vegas, New Mexico Territory, where he found work as a U.S. Deputy Marshal. In October 1879 he was arraigned and tried for being an accessory to a train robbery, but was acquitted. He also served on the East Las Vegas police force.

=== Gunfight at Close and Patterson's Variety Hall ===
Mather's reputation as a gunman originated in East Las Vegas when he got into a gunfight on January 22, 1880, while serving as assistant marshal. He and his boss, Town Marshal Joe Carson, became involved in a shootout with four men at Close and Patterson's Variety Hall on Main Street. Carson was killed; Mather killed William Randall and gravely injured James West. He also wounded Thomas Jefferson House and John Dorsey, but their wounds were minor and they fled the scene.

=== Killing of Joseph Castello ===
On January 25, 1880, three days after the gunfight at Close and Patterson's Variety Hall, Mather, now acting marshal, was summoned to an altercation involving Joseph Castello, who, in the heat of an argument with his employees, drew his revolver on them. When Mather arrived, Castello warned him not to approach or he would shoot. Newspaper accounts report that Mather drew his weapon and fired a single lethal shot before Castello could return fire. The coroner's jury ruled that Mather's "shooting was justifiable and in self protection."

Mather's career as marshal in East Las Vegas was short-lived. In February 1880, the survivors of the January gunfight were captured and returned to the San Miguel County Jail. Under Mather's watch, a lynch mob broke them and fellow gunman James West out of jail and hanged them all. During the next month, there were two murders on the same day. The public began to suspect Mather had ties to a local crime boss, and he resigned on March 3, 1880. Mather didn't leave East Las Vegas immediately; he was still there as late as March 19, when he signed his name to a court document intended to help John Joshua Webb, who had been charged with murder.

=== Charged with crimes in Texas ===
Records indicate that Mather spent the next several years drifting around Texas having various minor skirmishes with the law, including a stint in jail for counterfeiting and a three-month stretch in Dallas awaiting trial on charges of stealing a silk dress from a woman named Georgia Morgan, with whom he had operated a brothel. In three separate counts, Mather was also charged with the theft of two diamond rings and a watch from Morgan. He was acquitted of all three charges on April 13, 1882.

== Dodge City ==
On June 1, 1883, Mather was hired as an Assistant City Marshal in Dodge City. He served only nine months and was replaced on April 10, 1884, by Tom Nixon, sparking a feud between the two. The feud was further stoked when Dodge City passed "Ordinance No. 83", which outlawed dance halls. The ordinance was enforced against Mather's Opera House Saloon, preventing it from operating as a dance hall, but not against Nixon's Lady Gay Saloon, which also featured dancing. In retaliation, Mather began a price war on beer, charging only five cents a glass—half the price of his competitors. Nixon and the other Dodge City saloon owners pressured the beer wholesalers to cut off Mather's supply. The feud resulted in gunfire on July 18, 1884, when Nixon shot Mather but only wounded him slightly. Nixon posted bond on charges of attempted murder.

=== Killing of Tom Nixon ===
Three days later on July 21, Mather shot and killed Nixon during another confrontation. Despite supporting testimony from Bat Masterson and Dodge City Sheriff Patrick Sughrue, Mather's case was sent to trial. His attorney obtained a change of venue to Ford County and the trial began on December 29, 1884. It lasted only three days and, on December 31, the jury deliberated only seven minutes before declaring Mather not guilty. The Kinsley Mercury wrote that "the verdict was a proper one, as the weight of the testimony showed that Nixon was the aggressor in the affray and that Mather was justified in the shooting." (Note: The Mercury was published by Robert McCanse, the prosecuting attorney in Mather's case, and edited by McCanse's legal partner Samuel W. Vandivert, two men who had a vested interest in seeing Mather convicted.) The Dodge City Times noted that "the reading of the verdict, by the court, was interrupted by demonstrations of approval from the audience."

=== Killing of David Barnes ===
Josiah Mather rejoined his brother in Dodge City in early 1885. On May 10 of that year, both Mathers were in the Junction Saloon, where David Mather was playing cards with a man named David Barnes. An argument escalated into a gunfight and Barnes was killed.

Sheriff Pat Sughrue arrested both brothers. During testimony before a coroner's jury, Sughrue testified that Mather's pistol "was loaded and had no empty shells in it." Nonetheless, the jury ruled that "the deceased D. Barnes came to his death ... from a gun shot wound received at the hands of David Mathers [sic] and Josiah Mathers [sic] by means of revolvers by them fired, and that the said shooting was feloniously done."

A preliminary examination for the brothers was held in Dodge City twelve days later, on May 22. Both brothers were bound over for trial without bail. They immediately petitioned for a writ of habeas corpus. On June 2, 1885, Judge Strang allowed the defendants to post a bond of $3,000 and they were released. Their attorneys got their cases postponed until the December 1885 court term. The two defendants jumped bail and were never tried.

== Reports of his death ==
Mather's late life was, and remains, the subject of much rumor and speculation. Because of his notoriety, newspapers often reported rumors of his appearances, often unsubstantiated. The last substantiated knowledge of Mather's whereabouts occurred in New Kiowa, Kansas (now simply Kiowa, Kansas), in September 1885, where he is known to have raised a $300 legal defense fund for his longtime friend and partner Dave Black, accused of murdering a soldier, Bugler Julius Schmitz of the 18th Infantry Regiment, the previous month. Mather fled from Kiowa on September 6, when he heard rumors that the soldier's company might come after him for defending the murderer of their comrade.

In November 1887, Mather's bail bondsmen were called before the court in Dodge City to make restitution for Mather's failure to appear for trial in the Barnes case. At that time, the bondsmen filed a petition to set aside the bail, claiming that Mather was dead, although they were unable to produce the body. The county attorney agreed with the petition and moved to dismiss the charges against the bondsmen, which the trial judge approved on November 9, 1887.

No other record of Mather's death exists, and rumors of his possible fate are continually abundant. In an article in the November 1902 issue of Everybody's Magazine, author Edward Campbell Little claimed that Mather had gone to the Northwest Territories and "enlisted as one of the Royal Canadian Mounted Police (RCMP), looted the stage he was sent to guard, and escaped with twenty thousand pounds. His brother Cy [Josiah] reports that he was killed by moonshiners in the mountains of Tennessee." This report contradicts Josiah's own version of events, as told to his children, that he never saw or heard from David after they parted company at Dodge City following the Barnes killing.

Writing later in 1954, author William Waters wrote that Mather was employed with the RCMP as late as 1922, a claim that was refuted by the organization.

== In popular culture ==
- In season 13, episode 6 (Tombstone) of the TV series Supernatural, protagonists Sam and Dean Winchester have to face a ghoul that has taken on the form and identity of Mather. The ghoul acts as the episode's main antagonist and is killed in the episode's conclusion.
- Mather is played by Douglas Kennedy in The Life and Legend of Wyatt Earp.

== See also ==
- List of fugitives from justice who disappeared

== Bibliography ==
- Bryan, Howard. Wildest of the Wild West: True Tales of a Frontier Town on the Santa Fe Trail, Santa Fe, NM: Clear Light Publishers, 1988. ISBN 0-940666-08-1
- DeMattos, Jack. Mysterious Gunfighter: the Story of Dave Mather. Creative Publishing Company, College Station, TX 1992 ISBN 0-932702-95-3
- DeMattos, Jack. "Mysterious Dave Mather – A View from 1902." Wild West History Association Journal ( Vol. IV, No. 5), Oct. 2011.
- DeMattos, Jack. "The Unmysterious Mather," Wild West History Association Journal (Vol. V, No. 4), August 2012.
- DeMattos, Jack. "The Boyhood of Mysterious Dave Mather," Wild West History Association Journal (Vol. VIII, No. 2), April 2015.
- Mather, Horace E. Lineage of Rev. Richard Mather, Hartford, CT: Lockwood & Brainard, 1890.
- Miller, Nyle H. and Snell, Joseph W. Why the West Was Wild: A Contemporary Look at the Antics of Some Highly Publicized Cowtown Personalities. Topeka, KS: Kansas State Historical Society, 1963.
- Perrigo, Lynn. Gateway to Glorieta: A History of Las Vegas, New Mexico, Boulder, CO: Pruett Publishing Company. ISBN 0-87108-597-6
- Rickards, Colin. "Mysterious Dave Mather," The English Westerners Brand Book (Vol. 1, No. 3), January 1959.
- Shillingberg, Wm. B. Dodge City: The Early Years, 1872-1886. Norman, OK: The Arthur H. Clark, Co., 2009 ISBN 978-0-87062-378-3
