= Fort Dodge (United States Army Post) =

American military base (1865–1882)

- Fort Dodge, Kansas
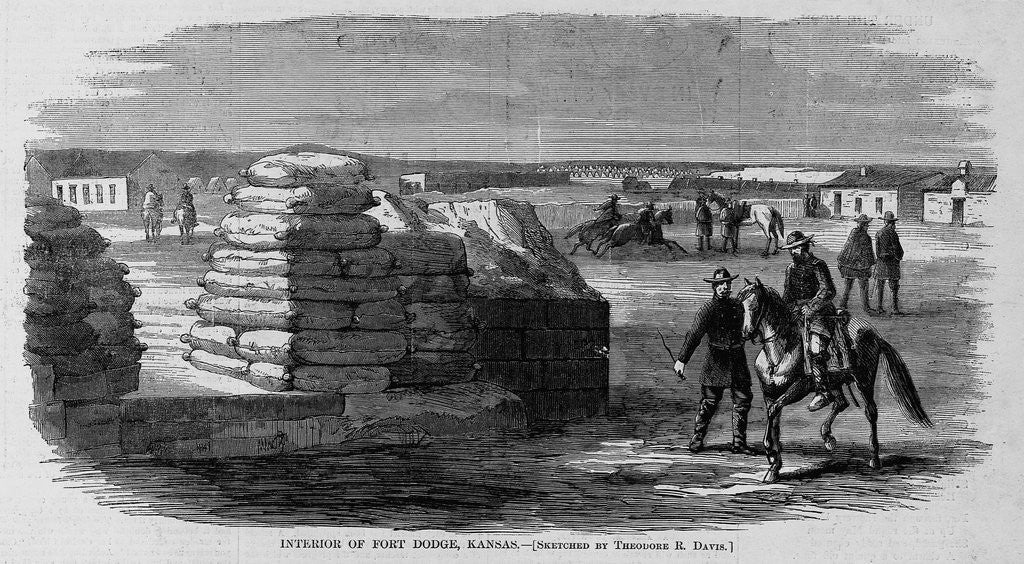
- Interior of Fort Dodge, Kansas, Harper's Weekly, 1867

Site information
- Type: Military base
- Owner: Kansas Commission on Veterans Affairs
- Controlled by: United States
- Open to the public: Yes
- Condition: Repurposed as the Kansas Soldiers' Home

Location
- Location in Kansas
- Coordinates: 37°43′50″N 99°56′5″W

Site history
- Built: 1865
- Built by: U.S. Army
- In use: 1865-1882

The site of Fort Dodge in the U.S. state of Kansas was originally an old campground for wagons traveling along the Santa Fe Trail, just west of the western junction of the Wet and Dry Routes and near the middle or Cimarron Cutoff. On March 23, 1865, Major General Grenville M. Dodge, who commanded the 11th and 16th Kansas Cavalry Regiments, wrote to Colonel James Hobart Ford to propose establishing a new military post west of Fort Larned. On orders of Col. Ford, Captain Henry Pearce, with Company C, Eleventh Cavalry Regiment, and Company F, Second U.S. Volunteer Infantry, from Fort Larned, occupied and established Fort Dodge on April 10, 1865.

== History ==
Fort Dodge was named for General Grenville M. Dodge. General Dodge wrote in his autobiography:

Fort Dodge was named after me, not as an honor, by a command that I was sent out there in the winter, after it was too late to furnish them lumber or anything for an encampment and they had to make dug-outs in the Bluffs for the purpose of wintering and the Colonel in command of the detachment wrote me that they were so mad at being sent there in the winter with so little accommodations that they had named the place Camp Dodge. This location was a celebrated crossing of the Southern Indians of the Arkansas Valley. There was a practicle (sic) ford of the Arkansas near here and the trails all centered here an it had been an important point during all the time I was in command of the plains. From Camp Dodge, when a permanent post was ordered there, they named it Fort Dodge and after the war when the fort was abandoned, a city had grown up there, which is now known as Dodge City.

— Grenville Mellen Dodge

It has, however, been claimed that the post was named for Col. Henry Dodge. Moses Henry Dodge (he dropped the "Moses" when he came of age) led the Second Dragoon Expedition of 1835 in a circuit to and from Fort Leavenworth, west along the Platte River to Colorado and back east along the Arkansas River and the Santa Fe trail, passing through the future location of Dodge City and Fort Dodge. There is no evidence that he established a camp at the site.

Fort Dodge was used to maintain order along the Santa Fe Trail between there and Fort Lyon, Colorado. The post was raided by Native Americans several times, with many horses being stolen and a number of soldiers killed in the raids. In a June 1865 raid, the US Army Inspector-General, D. B. Sacket, reported the Indians took every horse at Fort Dodge. Corporal Leander Herron received the Medal of Honor for heroism in action about 12 miles from Fort Dodge on September 2 and 3, 1868.

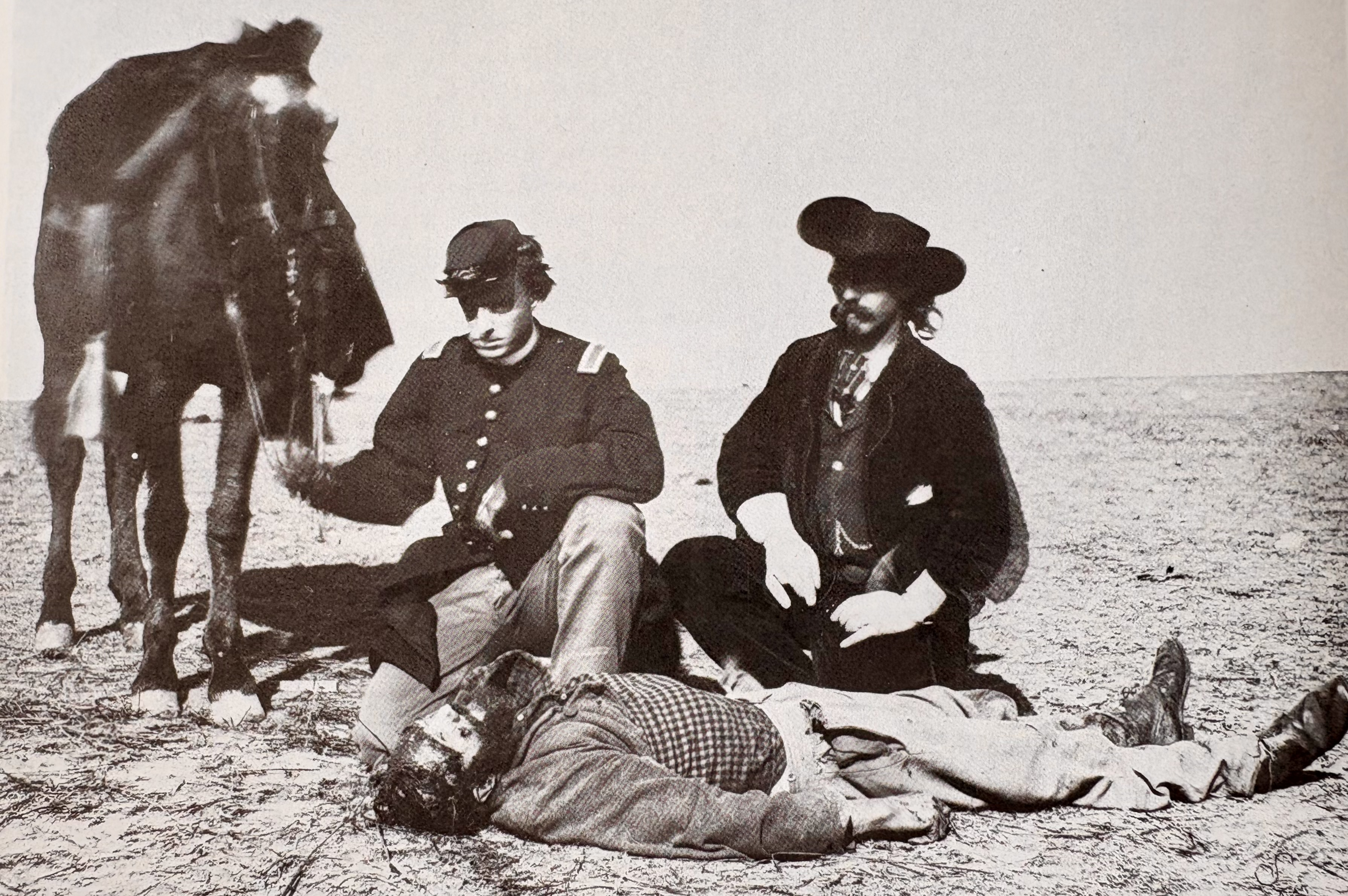
Buffalo hunter Ralph Morrison who was killed and scalped December 7, 1868, near Fort Dodge, Kansas, by Cheyenne warriors. Lt. Reade of the 3rd Infantry and Chief of Scouts John O. Austin are in the background. Photograph by William S. Soule.

The first buildings were constructed after the Civil War. These generally are believed to have been sod houses for the officers and dugouts for the enlisted men cut into the bank along the Arkansas River, along the south side of the post. However, Sean Creevey, a professor at Dodge City Community College, claimed that all the first housing consisted of "dugouts with canvas roofs dug into the bank of the Arkansas River." He denied any were built of sod or adobe.

Later, the dugouts were replaced with wooden and stone buildings. In its heyday, up to four companies of troops occupied the post. Apparently in its later years only about a dozen men occupied it and their main duty was to provide escorts to protect mail passing through the area. In 1882 the post was closed. A single custodian was assigned to keep watch over the property. A number of buildings were torn down or moved away, but many of the stone buildings remained.

Dodge City residents worked to have the old fort used for a retired soldiers' home, since most of the buildings were still functional. After much work toward that goal, a federal law was enacted in 1889 authorizing the use of the post as a soldiers' home by the State of Kansas. In early 1890 the Kansas Soldiers' Home was opened on the site. The Soldiers' Home has been maintained at Fort Dodge ever since. Numerous improvements have been made through the years and the public can tour part of the site.

== Gallery ==
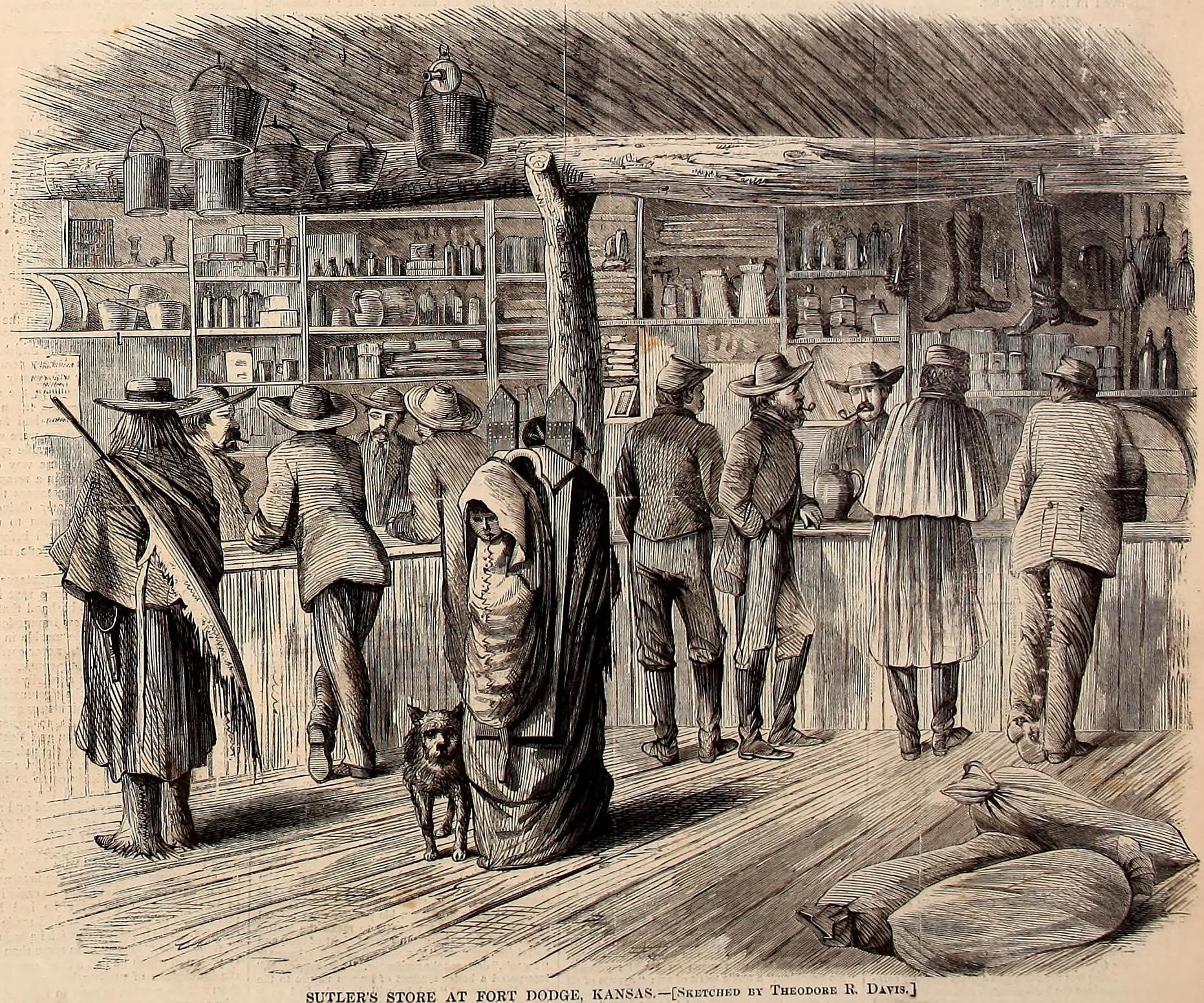
Sutler's Store at the fort, 1867

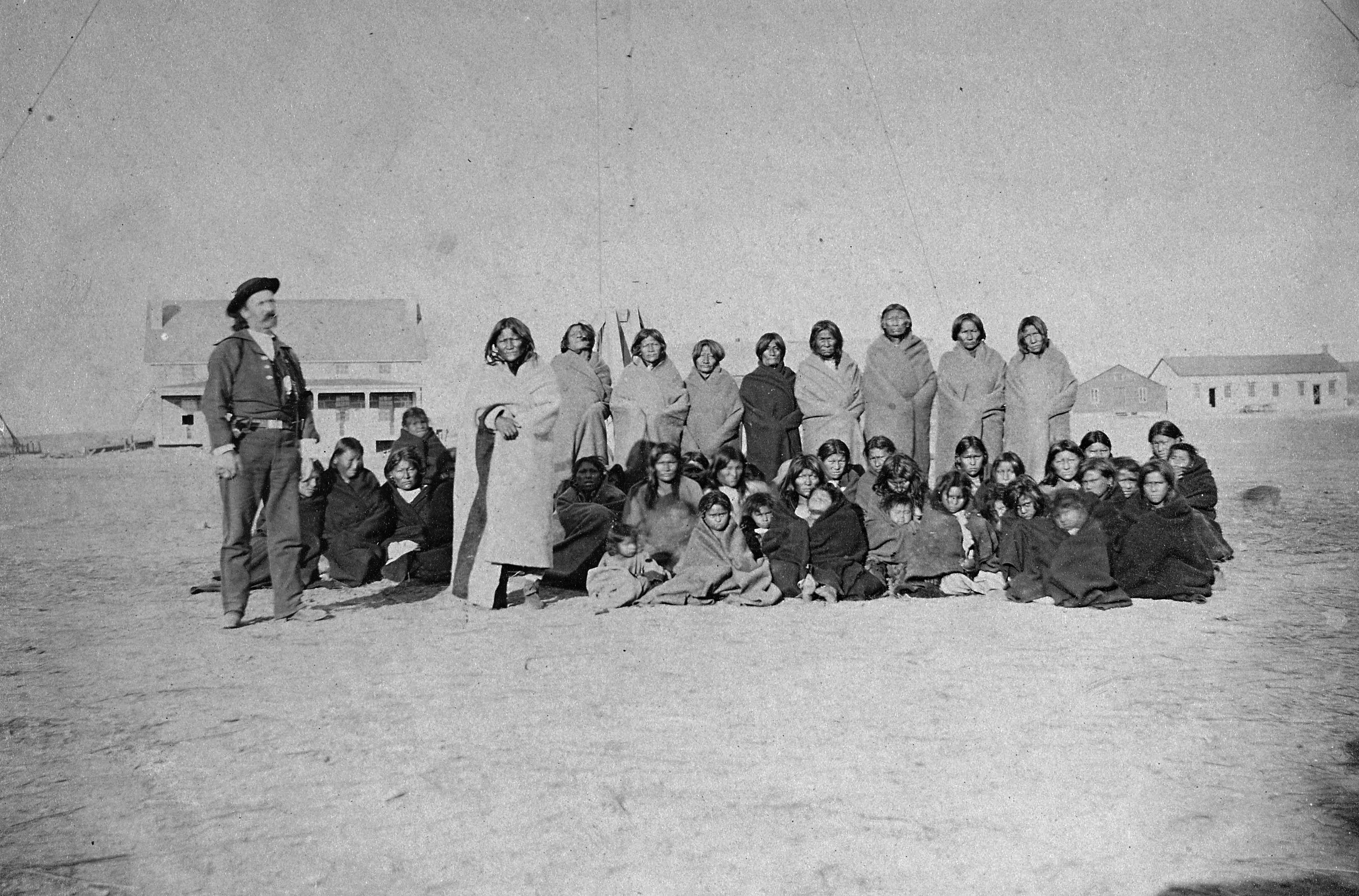
George Armstrong Custer's Washita prisoners at Fort Dodge in 1868
