= Nathan Boone =

American soldier, son of Daniel Boone (1780–1856)

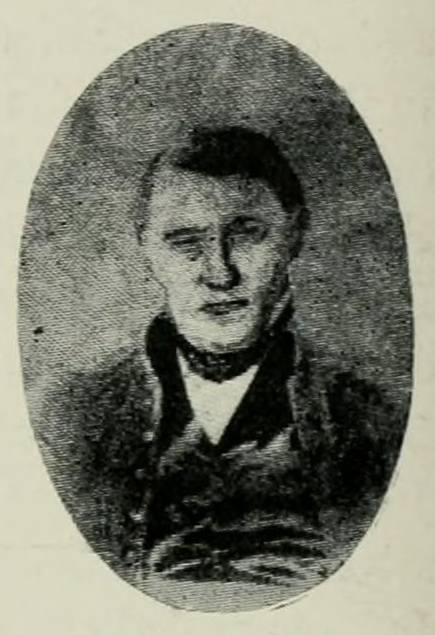
- Nathan Boone portrait, from the 1908 book, A History of Missouri, Vol. III by Louis Houck
- Born: 1780; Boone Station, near Athens, Fayette County, Kentucky
- Died: 1856 (aged 75–76); Ash Grove, Greene County, Missouri
- Occupations: Salt maker, road builder, merchant, farmer, army officer, soldier
- Known for: Being the youngest son of Daniel Boone, as an Indian fighter, and officer of the United States Mounted Rangers, the U.S. Army dragoons in Missouri, establishing Boone's Lick and the Boonslick Road
- Spouse: Olive Boone
- Parent(s): Daniel Boone; Rebecca Bryan Boone

Nathan Boone (1780–1856) was a veteran of the War of 1812, a delegate to the Missouri constitutional convention in 1820, and a captain in the 1st United States Regiment of Dragoons at the time of its founding, eventually rising to the rank of lieutenant colonel. Nathan was the youngest son of American explorer and frontiersman Daniel Boone.

== Biography ==
Nathan Boone was born at Boone Station, near Athens, Fayette County, Kentucky in 1780 and moved to Spanish Missouri with the family in 1799.

In 1807, he and his brother Daniel Morgan Boone first worked the salt licks in what became known as the Booneslick Country. The brothers built the Boone's Lick Road, which became a major overland route in early Missouri, linking St. Louis to the western frontier of the United States at that time, and later to Fort Osage and the Santa Fe Trail.

Miamis surrendering to Dodge. Painting is in the Missouri capitol.

Boone took part in the War of 1812 as captain of a company of United States Rangers which scouted in the country between the Mississippi and Illinois. On August 7, 1813. Boone and sixteen Rangers went on a patrol across Mississippi to gather intelligence to the north between the river and Illinois. Boone and his Rangers patrolled for 2 days but found nothing. At night, the Rangers camped. A fellow Ranger who acted as a sentry reported that he believed enemy Indian combatants were lurking in the darkness surrounding their camp. Nathan doubled his sentries, ordered his men to sleep away from the fire, and placed them behind trees around the camp. Near midnight, the Indians numbering at least 60 warriors launched a full scale surprise attack and opened heavy fire into the camp from one side. Both the Ranger sentries were shot and wounded. The Rangers fell back firing into the darkness where they saw muzzle flashes and heard loud voices. The Rangers took cover behind the trees on the other side of camp. Nathan crouched behind a tree and realized his rangers were outnumbered. The Rangers behind their trees frantically reloaded and fired trying to see their enemy in the darkness. Boone shouted his men to fall back from tree to tree. Nathan and his rangers ran off into the brush to safety. Nathan and his rangers rallied into a circle behind some trees. The rangers held their position behind their trees while the Indians were busy looting the camp. In the morning, the Indians had left with loot and as many ranger horses as they could take. Nathan and his rangers found only half their mounts. Nathan and his rangers withdrew back to base to inform their commander of confirmed intelligence that the Native American threat persisted still. The American Rangers only suffered 2 slightly wounded. He also took part in an expedition led by Henry Dodge to relieve settlers who had been raided by Miami Indians. He and Dodge saved 150 Miamis from massacre by members of their own militia. The Miamis had agreed to surrender as prisoners of war, and certain members of the militia became angered when they found contraband belonging to a settler who had been killed in the original raid, but Dodge and Boone stood in the line of fire and forced the nearly mutinous troops to back down. He attained the rank of major in the militia in the war.

After he was mustered out Boone retired to his farm in St. Charles County, Missouri. He built the first stone house north of the Missouri and his father died there. In 1820 he was a delegate to the Missouri constitutional convention.

He participated in the Black Hawk War in 1832. After the conclusion of those hostilities, he entered the regular army as captain in the United States Regiment of Dragoons, direct predecessor of the 1st Cavalry Regiment (United States Army), the regiment's first commander being Colonel Dodge. He participated in the First Dragoon Expedition, notable for making the first contact between the United States federal government and the southern plains Indians. His army service further included participation in the Second Dragoon Expedition, surveying the boundaries between the Creek and Cherokee Indian nations, and leading his own expedition into the southwestern plains in 1843. In 1847, he was made major in the army, and lieutenant-colonel in 1853. In 1853, Nathan Boone resigned and retired to his home in Ash Grove, Greene County, Missouri, where he died in 1856.

In the fall of 1851, Nathan Boone and his wife Olive Van Bibber were interviewed by Wisconsin Historical Society archivist Lyman C. Draper concerning his famous father. Along with the interviews, Boone presented Draper with a collection of family papers. Draper wrote a manuscript about Daniel Boone which was finally published as an edited and annotated version in 1998.

== Footnotes ==
- "Nathan Boone Homestead State Historic Site". Missouri State Parks. 6 February 2011.
- Houck, Louis (1908). A History of Missouri, Vol. III. Chicago: R. R. Donnelley & Sons.
- Boone, Nathan; Boone, Olive Van Bibber; Draper, Lyman C. (1999). Hammon, Neal O. (ed.). My father, Daniel Boone: the Draper interviews with Nathan Boone. Lexington: University Press of Kentucky. OCLC 40762810.
- Draper, Lyman C. (1998). Belue, Ted Franklin (ed.). The Life of Daniel Boone. Mechanicsburg, PA: Stackpole Books. OCLC 39307349.
