= First Dragoon Expedition =

1834 expedition by US Army

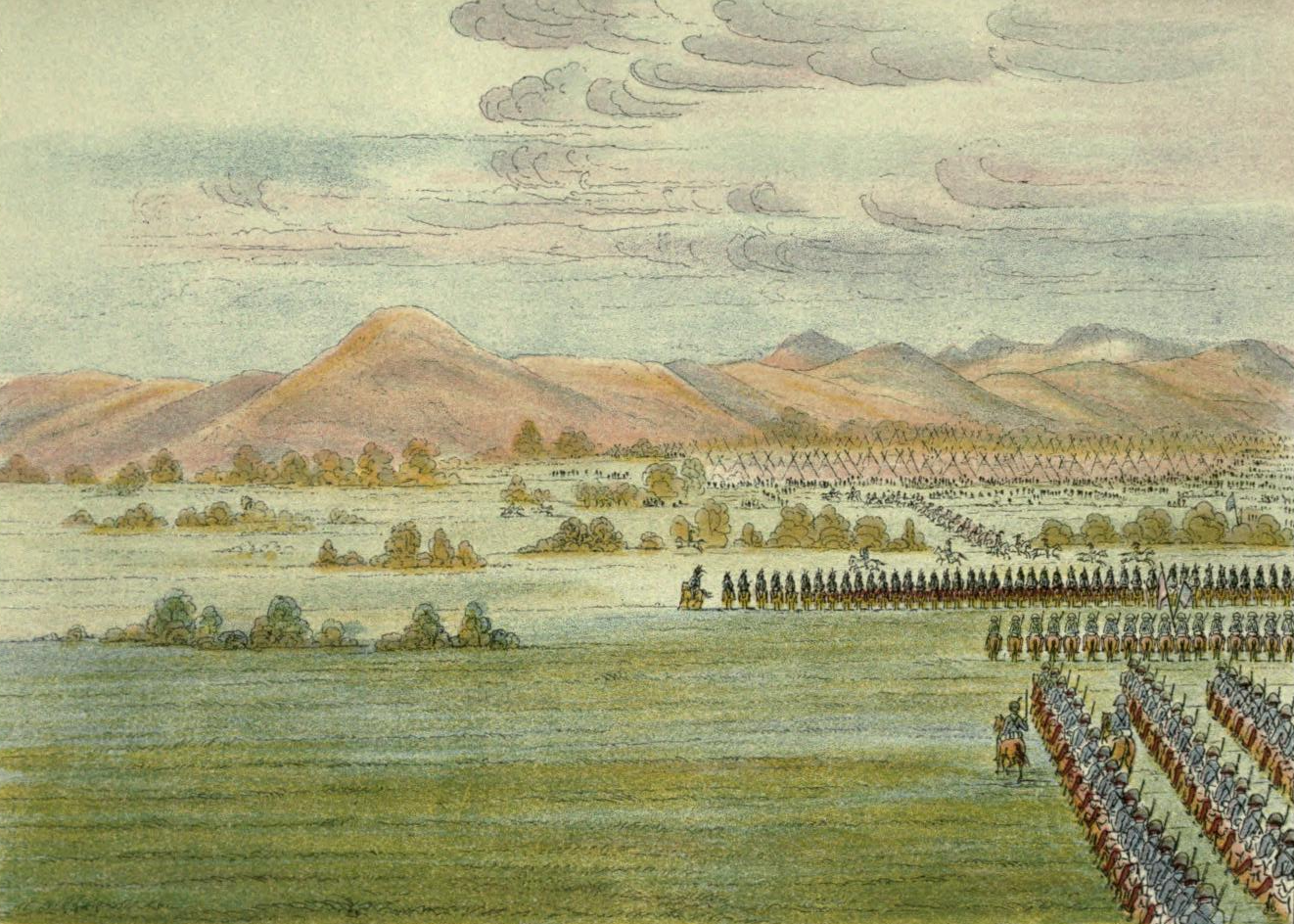
The United States Dragoon Regiment arrive at Comanche Village, 1834. Painting by George Catlin who accompanied the expedition.

The First Dragoon Expedition of 1834 (also known as the Dodge-Leavenworth Expedition) was an exploratory mission of the United States Army into the southwestern Great Plains of the United States. It was the first official contact between the American government and the Southern Plains Indians.

== History ==
The United States Dragoon Regiment left Fort Gibson, Indian Territory, on 20 June 1834, under the command of General Henry Leavenworth. In addition to the troops, there were 30 Cherokee, Delaware, Osage, and Seneca tribesmen who served as guides. The expedition entered the Cross Timbers region on July 10. The difficult terrain of the Cross Timbers region, together with summer heat, sickness, and death slowed the progress of the expedition; one hundred fifty of the five hundred men died on the march. The expedition stopped at Camp Leavenworth, where General Leavenworth, sick and injured from a buffalo hunt, sent the troops onward under the command of Colonel Henry Dodge. On July 16, 1834, the expedition left 75 sick men, including American traveling artist George Catlin, at Camp Comanche; Colonel Dodge and the rest of his men continued onward. General Leavenworth died on July 21, 1834.

On July 21, 1834, Colonel Dodge and the remaining men reached a village of Wichita Indians at Devils Canyon. One of the Wichita men was the father of a woman travelling with the expedition. The reunion resulted in easing Dodge's negotiations with the tribe on the next day, during which Dodge invited the tribe to send representatives to Washington, D.C. He also won the release of a white boy whom the Wichitas had captured during the previous Spring. (Note: Dodge was unsuccessful in getting another prisoner released, a Ranger private who had been captured during the 1833 expedition.)

Dodge also met with some Kiowas, who had arrived with some Comanches. Another woman traveling with the Leavenworth-Dodge group was a Kiowa, who had been kidnapped by Osages in 1833. Dodge returned her to her tribe, winning their friendship. He urged the three tribes to avoid attacking white and Eastern Indian people. A few days later, the main body of the expedition left for Fort Gibson which they reached on August 15, 1834.

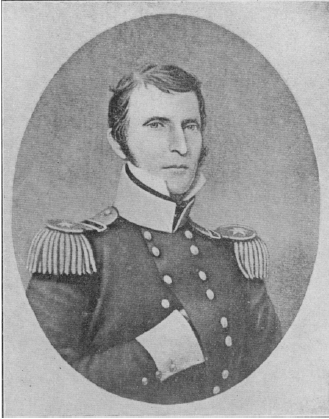
General Henry Leavenworth the commander of the United States Regiment of Dragoons

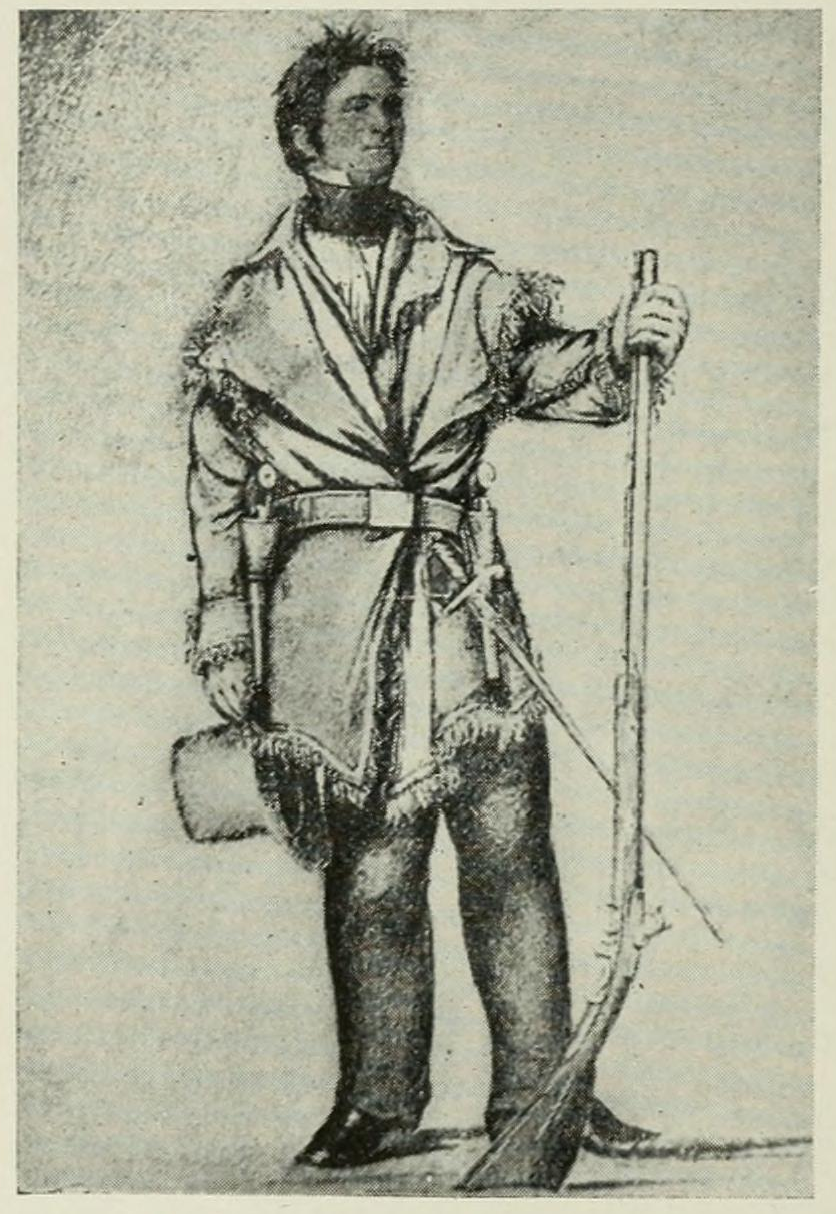
George Catlin sketch of Colonel Henry Dodge, commander of the United States Mounted Rangers, 1833.

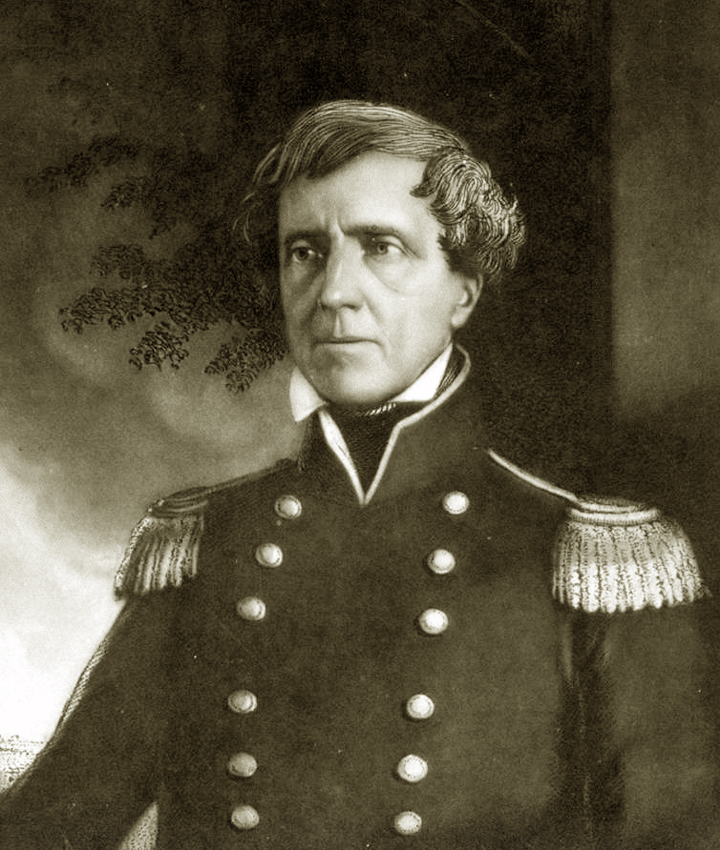
Lieutenant Colonel Stephen W. Kearny was second in command of the Dragoons and later died in the Mexican–American War

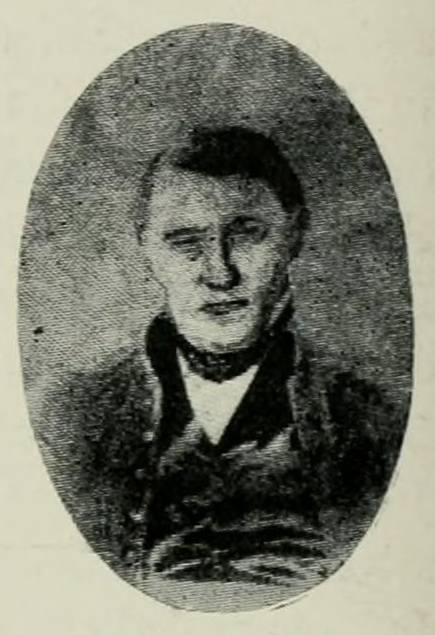
Nathan Boone the youngest son of Daniel Boone was on the expedition and served with Henry Dodge in the War of 1812

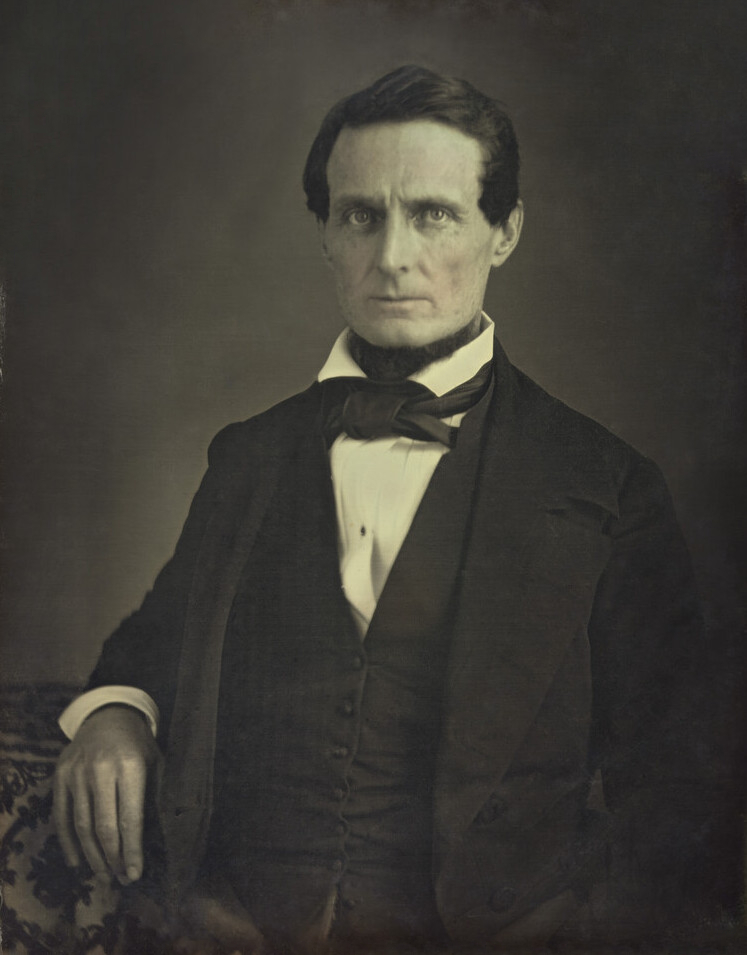
First Lieutenant Jefferson Davis was in command of Dragoon company F who later became the President of the Confederate States of America.

== Notable expedition members ==
In addition to Dodge, Leavenworth and Catlin, notable members of the expedition included:

- Stephen W. Kearny, lieutenant colonel and second in command of the dragoons. Kearny led the conquest of California in the Mexican–American War, and died from yellow fever he contracted in Veracruz.
- Richard B. Mason, major. Like Kearny, Mason was a one-time military governor of California, and in that capacity reported the gold discovery to president Polk in 1848.
- Edwin Vose "Bull" Sumner, captain of Company B. Sumner later became a Civil War commander, retiring with the rank of major general.
- David Hunter, captain company D. Hunter became a Civil War general, who promoted the idea of recruiting freed slaves as soldiers. He retired with the rank of major general.
- Nathan Boone, captain company H. Boone was the youngest son of Daniel Boone and served with Dodge in the War of 1812.
- Philip St. George Cooke, first lieutenant company G. Cooke became a Civil War general, and wrote the army's first cavalry manual. He retired as a brevet major general.
- Jefferson Davis, first lieutenant company F. Davis became Secretary of War, and later was President of the Confederate States of America.
- John Burgwin, second lieutenant company B. He died at the Siege of Pueblo de Taos in 1847.
- Enoch Steen, second lieutenant company D. Steen held a number of posts throughout the United States, mostly in the western parts. He was a lieutenant colonel in the 2nd United States Cavalry during the Civil War.
- Jesse Chisholm, guide and interpreter. Chisholm was the namesake of the famous Texas-Kansas cattle trail.

== George Catlin paintings ==
All of the following are produced from Catlin's paintings and other published images, which originated with sketches that he made on the expedition.

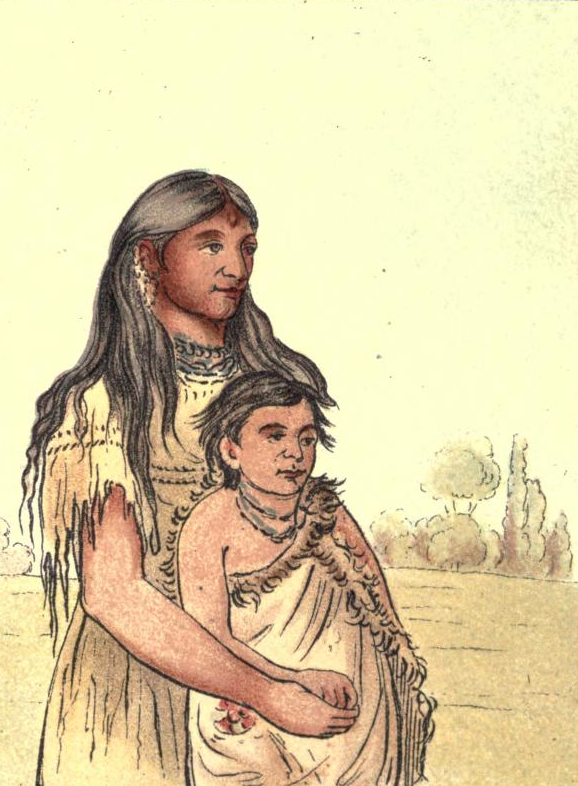
Wun-pan-to-mee (the white weasel) and Tunk-aht-oh-ye (the thunderer), Kiowa brother and sister rescued by the expedition. Shortly after this sketch was taken, the boy was killed in a stock yard accident.

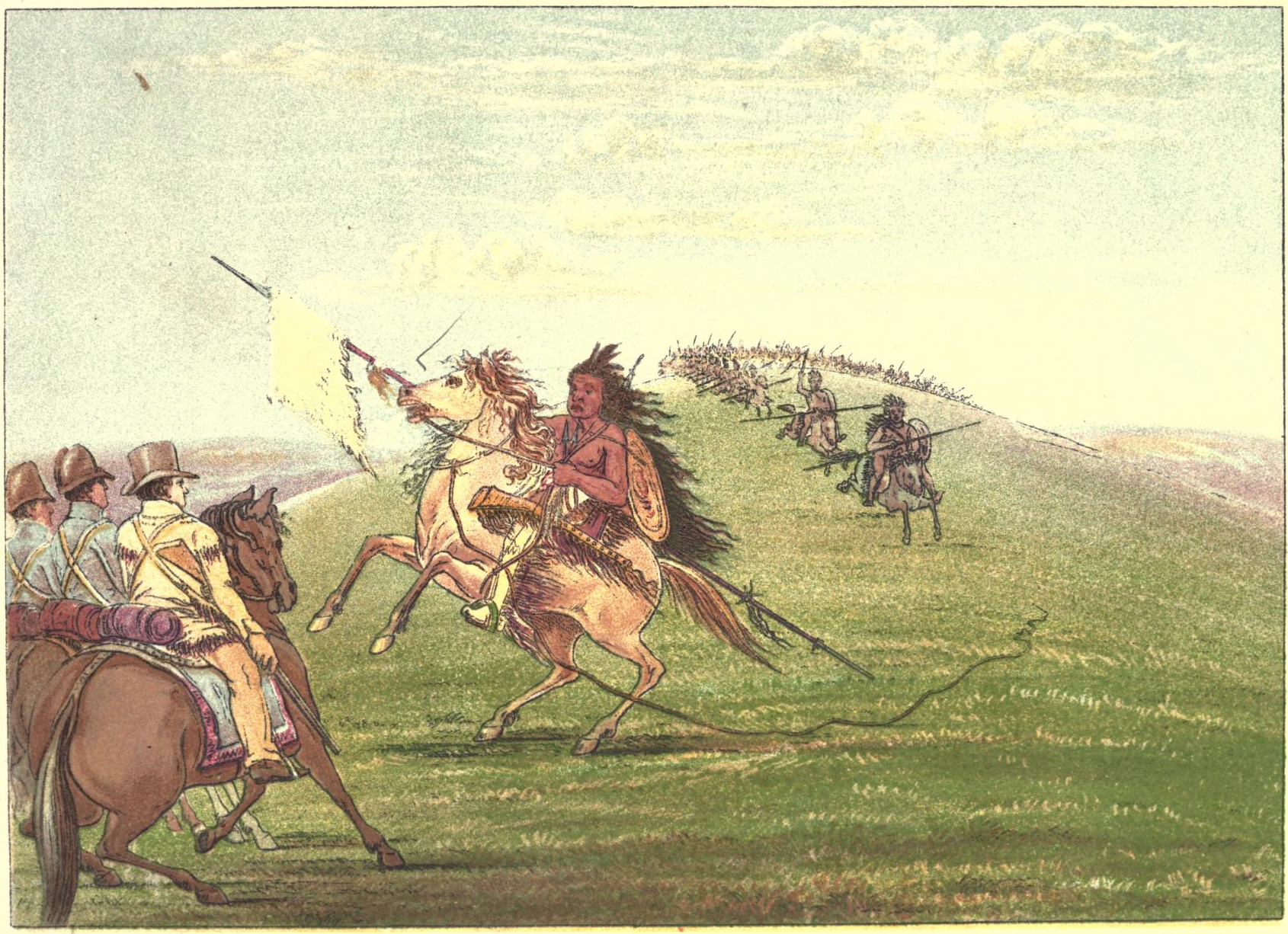
Colonel Henry Dodge first meets a Comanche emissary, July 14, 1834. Note the leather dragoon helmets of the soldiers and Dodge's buckskin outfit.

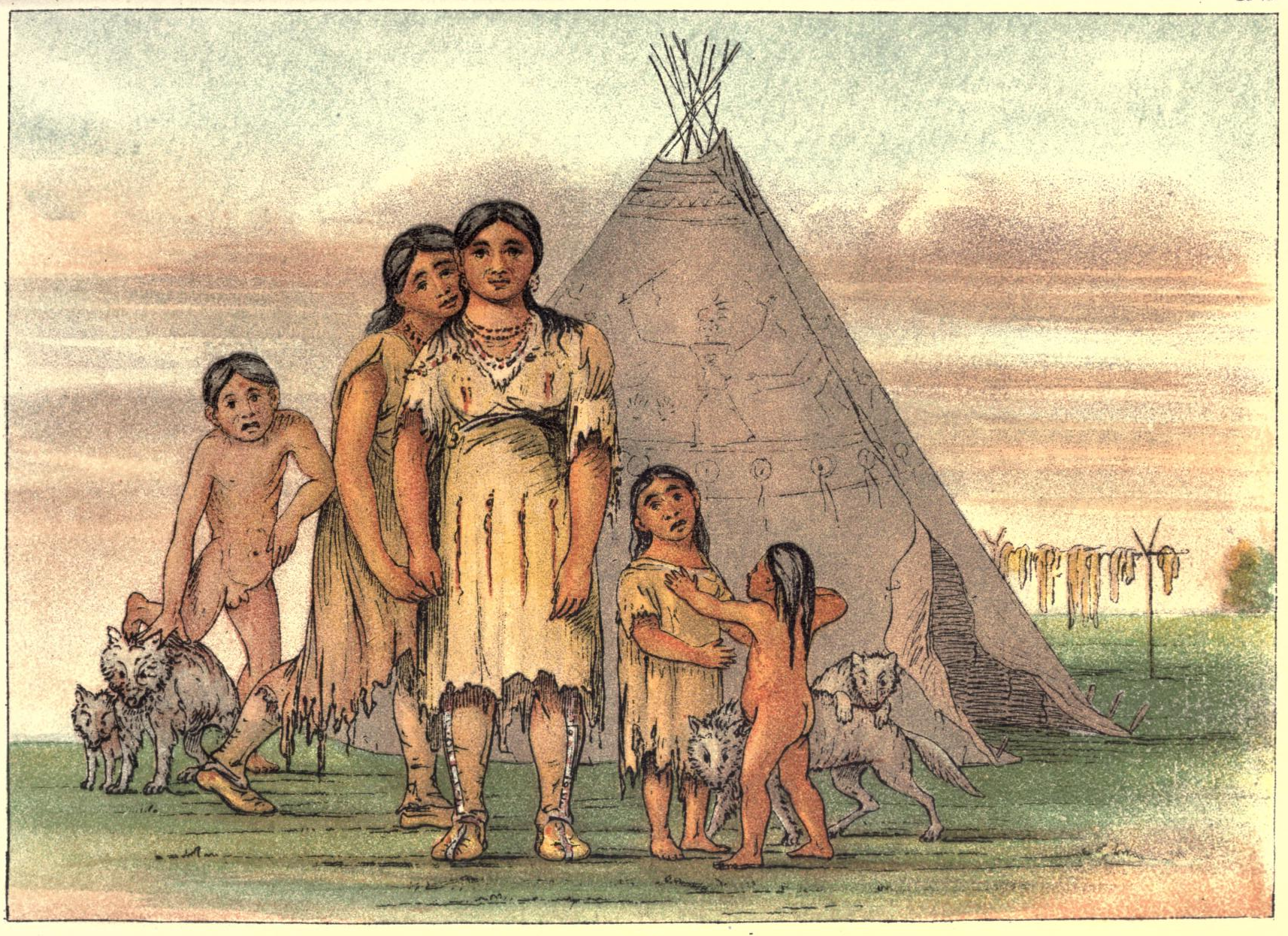
Residents of the Comanche village, approximately July 16, 1834. Catlin notes in his text, and depicts in the drawing, the fear of the dogs and children.

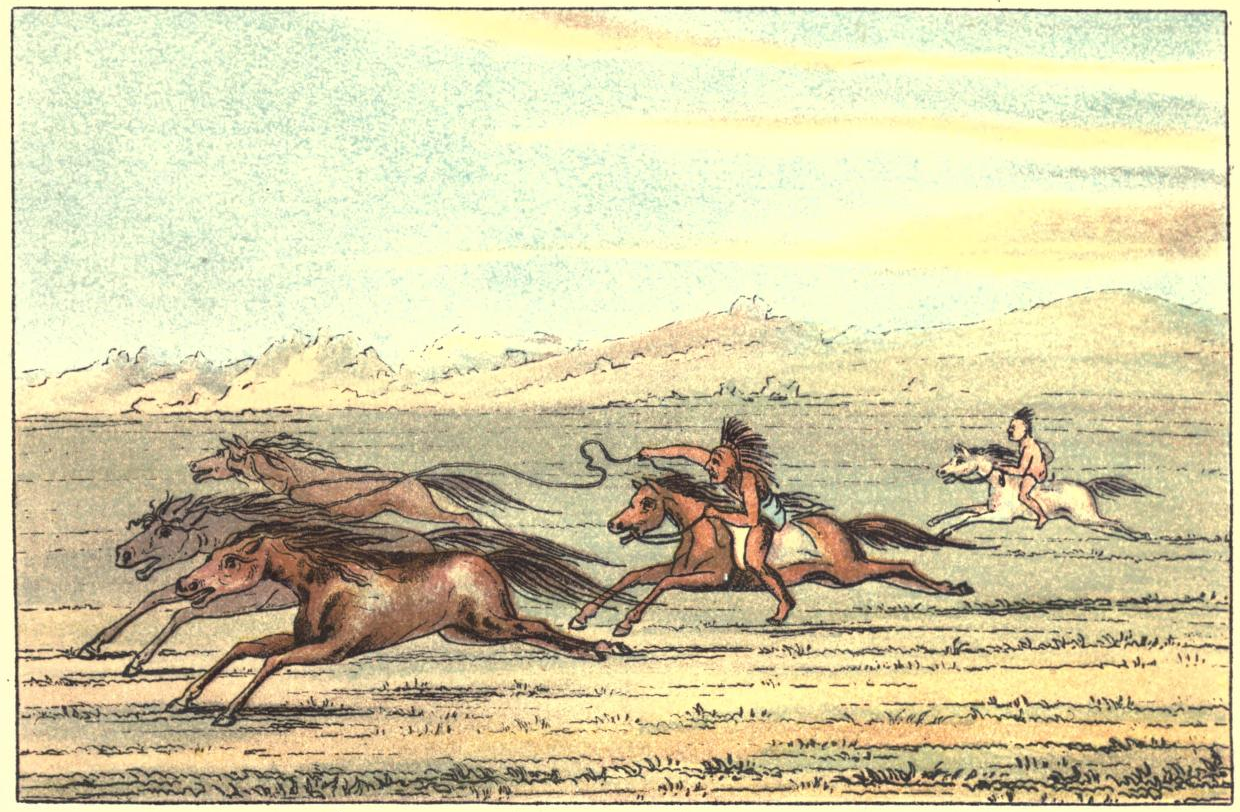
Comanches capturing wild horses with lassos, approximately July 16, 1834.

== See also ==
- United States Regiment of Dragoons
- Second Dragoon Expedition

== Sources ==
- Catlin, George (1876). Illustrations of the manners, customs & condition of the North American Indians, Vol. 2. London: Chatto & Windus. pp. 36–96.
- Hildreth, James (1836). Dragoon Campaigns to the Rocky Mountains: Being a History of the Enlistment Organization and First Campaigns of the Regiment of U S Dragoons. New York: Wiley & Long.
- Pelzer, Louis (1911). Henry Dodge. Iowa City: State Historical Society of Iowa. pp. 94–112.
- Perrine, Fred S. "The Journal of Hugh Evans," Chronicles of Oklahoma 3:3 (September 1925) 2-215 (retrieved August 16, 2006).
- Salter, William (1885). "Henry Dodge. Colonel U.S. Dragoons, 1833-6. Part I." Iowa Historical Record. 7, 8, 9. Iowa City State Historical Society: 101–119.
- Shirk, George H. "Peace on the Plains," Chronicles of Oklahoma 28:1 (January 1950) 2-41 (retrieved August 16, 2006).
- Stout, Jr., Joseph Allen, ed. (1976). Frontier Adventurers: American Exploration in Oklahoma. Oklahoma City, Oklahoma: Oklahoma Historical Society. ISBN 978-0941498036. LCCN 76-23590. OCLC 14052108.
- Wheelock, T.B. (1860). "Journal of Colonel Dodge's Expedition from Fort Gibson to Pawnee Pict Village, August 26, 1834". American State Papers. Documents, Legislative and Executive, Congress of the United States, from the First Session of the Twenty-second to the First Session of the Twenty-fourth Congress, Inclusive, Commencing March 15, 1832, and Ending January 5, 1836, Class V Military Affairs, Volume V. Washington: Gales and Seaton. pp. 373–382.
