= Devil's Canyon (Kiowa County, Oklahoma) =

- U.S. National Register of Historic Places
- Location within Oklahoma Location within the United States
- Nearest city: Lugert, Oklahoma
- Coordinates: 34.835833°N 99.255278°W
- Area: 738 acres (299 ha)
- NRHP reference No.: 72001066
- Added to NRHP: June 20, 1972

Devil's Canyon, in present-day Kiowa County, Oklahoma, was the site of the first formal contact between the United States government and the Plains Indians. On July 21, 1834, US troops under the command of Col. Henry Dodge escorted government officials to a peace conference at the Wichita village on the prairie at the confluence of the canyon and the North Fork of the Red River.
