= Arikara War =

1823 war between the US and Arikara natives

- Part of the American Indian Wars
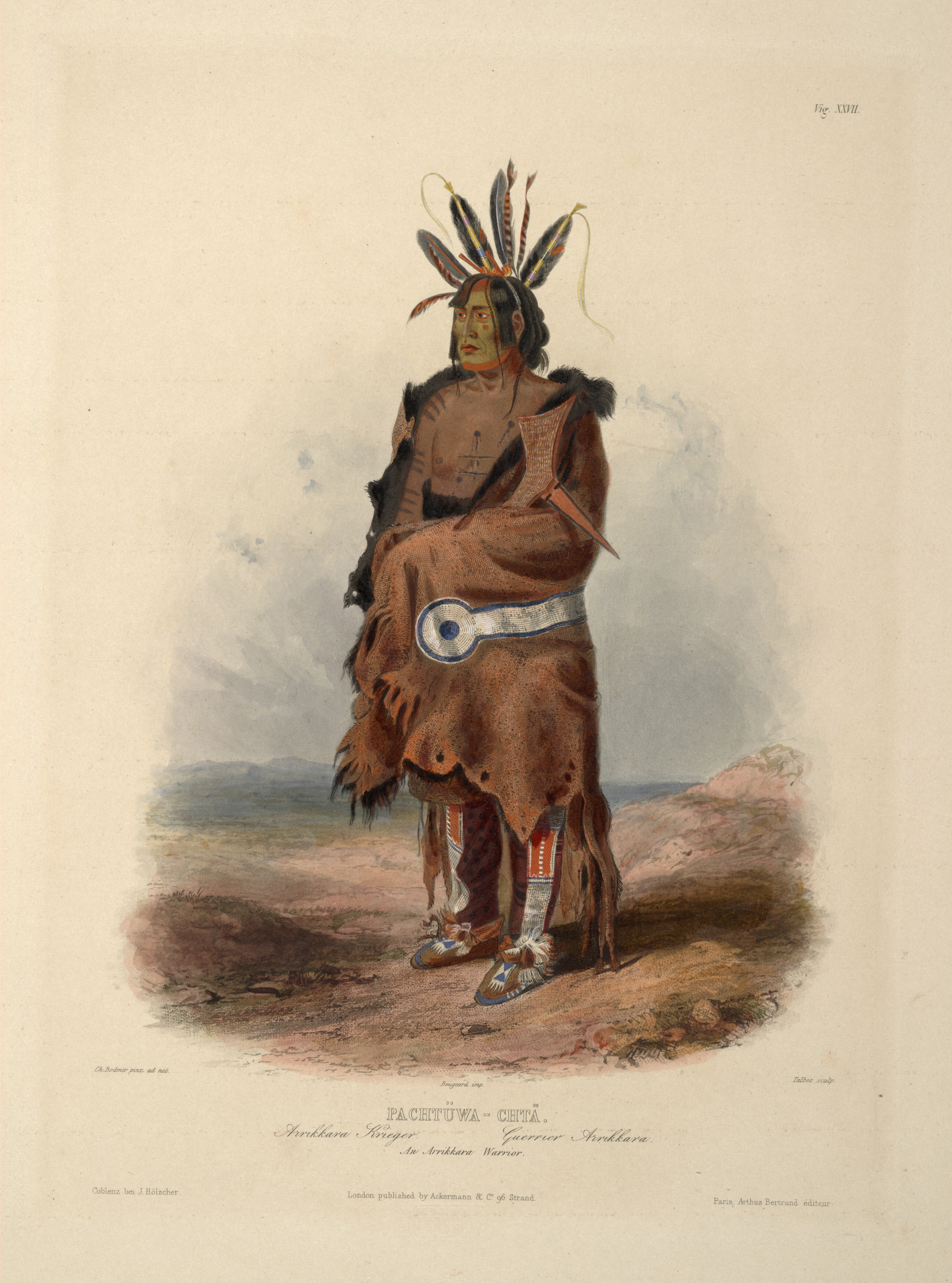
- An Arikara warrior, by artist Karl Bodmer
Date	June 2 – August 11, 1823 (2 months, 1 week and 2 days)
Location	South Dakota
Result	Indecisive

Belligerents
(United States) United States; Sioux	Arikara

Commanders and leaders
(United States) James Monroe (United States) William Ashley (United States) Henry Leavenworth (United States) Joshua Pilcher	Grey Eyes; Little Soldier

Units involved
Rocky Mountain Fur Company: "Ashley's Hundred": 70; Missouri Legion: 6th Infantry: 230; Sioux warriors: 750; Fur trappers: 50	Arikara: At least 600 warriors

Casualties and losses
12 members of Ashley's company killed Seven people from the Army drowned in Missouri River.	Likely more than 10 warriors and villagers, among them Grey Eyes.

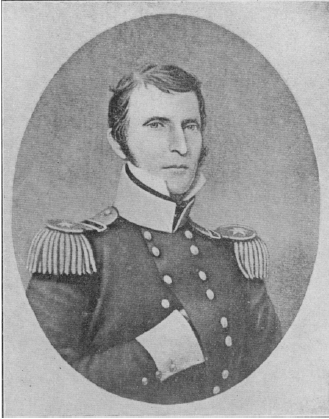
Henry Leavenworth

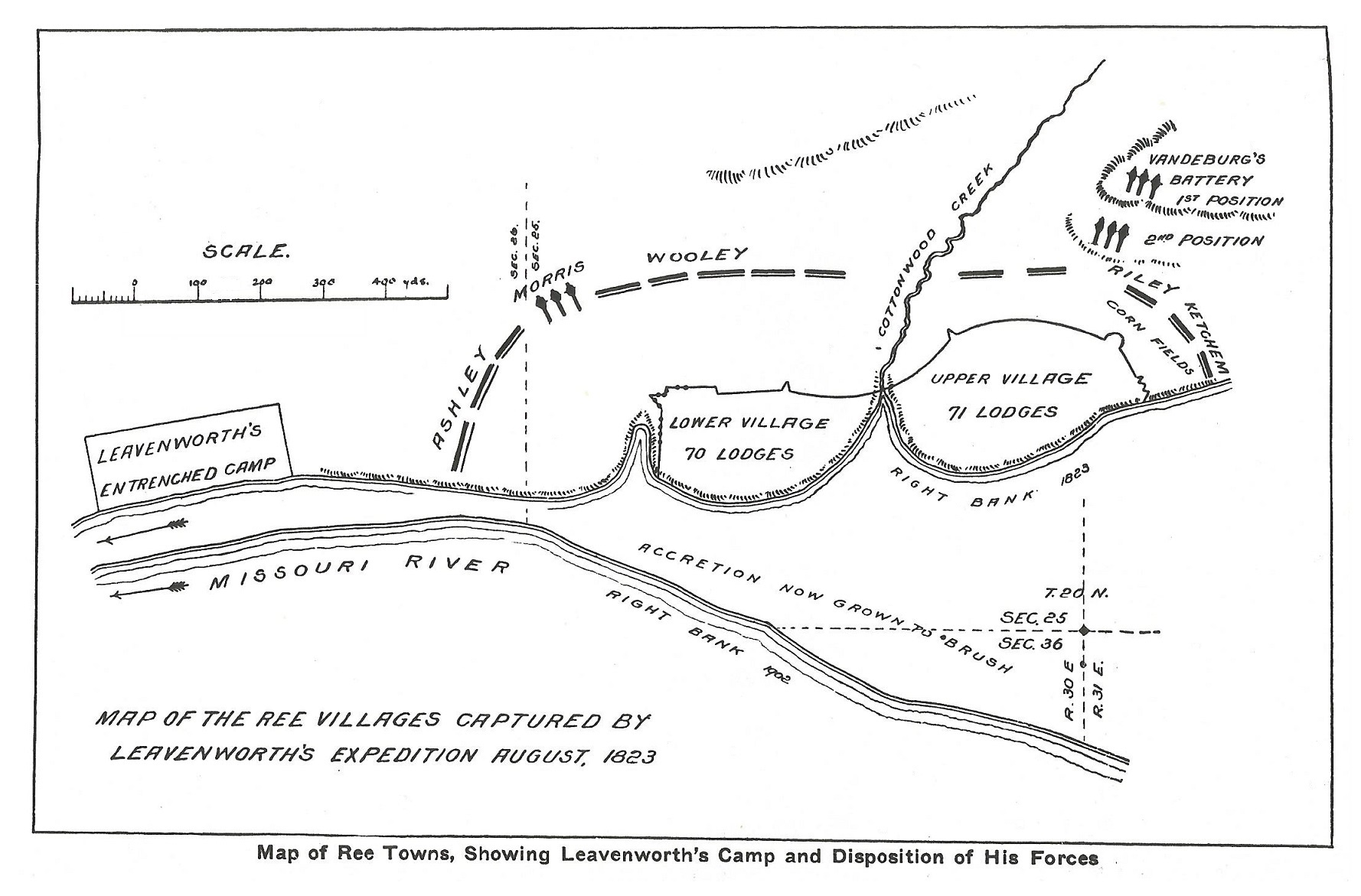
Map of the Arikara villages, the camp of the army and the position of the batteries

The Arikara War was a military conflict between the United States and Arikara in 1823 fought in the Great Plains along the Upper Missouri River in the Unorganized Territory (presently within South Dakota). For the United States, the war was the first in which the United States Army was deployed for operations west of the Missouri River on the Great Plains. The war, the first and only conflict between the Arikara and the U.S., came as a response to an Arikara attack on U.S. citizens engaged in the fur trade. The Arikara War was called "the worst disaster in the history of the Western fur trade".

== Background ==
Relations between the United States and the Arikara commenced in 1804. Initially, the relations were amicable. In 1806, Ankedoucharo, an Arikara leader, died during a trip to the United States capital. Although the U.S. claimed that his death was from natural causes, the Arikara widely believed that Ankedoucharo was deliberately murdered by U.S. citizens. In subsequent years, contact between the Arikara and White Americans increased as a result of the growing activity of corporations engaged in the international fur trade. In early 1823, the Arikara attacked a corporate fort belonging to the Missouri Fur Company, killing two U.S. citizens.

The Arikara had poor relations with the Western Dakota and Lakota Sioux, two stronger Indigenous nations along its borders. The Arikara involved in the war were living in two communities on the west shore of the Missouri River located approximately six miles upstream from the mouth of Grand River, and a small creek separated the two fortified communities of Arikara homes.

The causes of the war are not well recorded, but the trading relationship of the Arikara with white traders was certainly a factor. The Arikara lived in permanent settlements for most of the year where they farmed, fished and hunted buffalo on the surrounding plains. However, this was insufficient to sustain them and they relied on being a center of trade with neighboring tribes to survive. William Henry Ashley's expedition to directly acquire furs and pelts cut out the Arikara in their role as trading middle-men and was thus a direct threat to their livelihood. There was also the issue of their desire to have a trading post on their territory so that they could have easy access to manufactured goods. They resented the fact that their long-time enemies, the Sioux, had such posts, but they did not. Ashley had been asked to set up a trading post when he was in the area in 1822. Not wishing to limit his operations by having to maintain a permanent base, Ashley instead promised the Arikara that he would have the goods they asked for shipped to them directly from St. Louis. Ashley had not made good this promise at the time of his 1823 expedition, and possibly never intended to. The death of Ankedoucharo was probably not a direct cause of the war, but it did add to the general resentment.

== The assault and the Arikara War (1823) ==
On 2 June 1823, Arikara warriors assaulted trappers working for Ashley's Rocky Mountain Fur Company on the Missouri River, killing twenty men and wounding nine others. The weapons used had been given to them by Ashley. The surviving trappers retreated down the river and hid in shelters, where they stayed for more than a month.

The United States responded with a combined force of 230 soldiers of the 6th Infantry, 750 Sioux allies, and 50 trappers and other company employees under the command of Lieutenant Colonel Henry Leavenworth, Fort Atkinson, present-day Nebraska:

"The forces thus organized, including regular troops, mountaineers, voyageurs and Indians, were styled the Missouri Legion."

The 750 warriors were part Yankton and Yanktonai Sioux, part western Sioux from the Brule, the Blackfeet, and the Hunkpapa divisions. The Lakotas "... appeared anxious to join us". The Indian force received promises of Arikara horses and spoils, and with the enemy's villages fallen new ranges would open for the Sioux.

On 9 August 1823, Leavenworth arrived at the Arikara villages and commenced the attack using his Sioux cavalry, but this was held off by the Arikara. On 10 August, Leavenworth ordered an artillery bombardment. This was largely ineffective, the shots falling beyond the villages, at which point Leavenworth ordered an infantry attack. Like the Sioux auxiliaries, the regular infantry also failed to break into the villages. They left the battlefield with some captured horses and laden with corn taken from the farming Indians' fields.

On 11 August 1823, Leavenworth negotiated a peace treaty:

"In making this treaty, I met with every possible difficulty which it was in the power of the Missouri Fur Company to throw in my way."

Fearing further attacks, the Arikara left the village that night. Leavenworth set off to return to Fort Atkinson on 15 August. The Arikara village was burned behind him by resentful members of the Missouri Fur Company, much to Leavenworth's anger.

The US Army suffered the first casualties in the West during the Arikara War. Seven people drowned in the Missouri.

== Aftermath ==
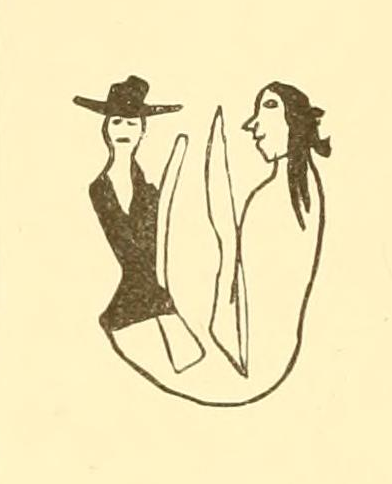
Cloud-Shield's winter count (Lakota). 1823-24. "They joined the whites in an expedition up the Missouri River against the Rees [Arikaras]". Hundreds of Sioux Indians were the first to side with the U.S. army in an Indian war west of the Missouri. The event is recorded in some of the winter counts of the Lakotas.

The Arikara refugees returned the following spring, restoring the villages. After the destruction of the Arikara village on 2 June, some Americans angrily accused the Hudson's Bay Company of stirring up the Arikara against the American trappers in order to profit from their reduced involvement in the fur trade thanks to the war. Representatives for the Hudson's Bay Company denied this, pointing out they had never had any trappers contracted by them working in the region.

The hostility between the United States and the Arikara ended officially on 18 July 1825, when the two opponents signed a peace treaty. The U.S. Army and the Arikara never engaged in battle again.

As for the Sioux, "the result of the [Leavenworth] expedition ruined the reputation of all whites in the eyes of the Indians". The Sioux continued to attack the Arikaras and press them north, from one village to another. In 1851, the western Sioux claimed the 1823 battleground as Lakota territory and later received formal treaty recognition on the former Arikara land.

Although brief, the conflict was noted for two reasons: it was the first military conflict between the United States and Native Americans in the West, setting the tone for future encounters between whites and other Native American groups; and since Leavenworth did not completely defeat the Arikara, his leniency toward them sparked a great debate between white Americans demanding subjugation of the natives and those advocating for peaceful cohabitation.

The Arikara eventually settled with the Mandan and Hidatsa on the Fort Berthold Reservation in North Dakota. Many Arikara and Crow people became Indian scouts during the height of the Sioux Wars.

Archaeological work at the location of the Arikara villages (Leavenworth site (39CO9)) in 1932 gave a clue to the futile shelling of the earth lodges more than 100 years earlier. The upper stratums of earth hid a number of unexploded shells.

== In the media ==
A fictionalized representation of the 1823 attack by the Arikara on the Rocky Mountain Fur Company appears in the 2015 film The Revenant from the perspective of trapper Hugh Glass.
