= Henry Leavenworth =

American soldier and politician (1783–1834)

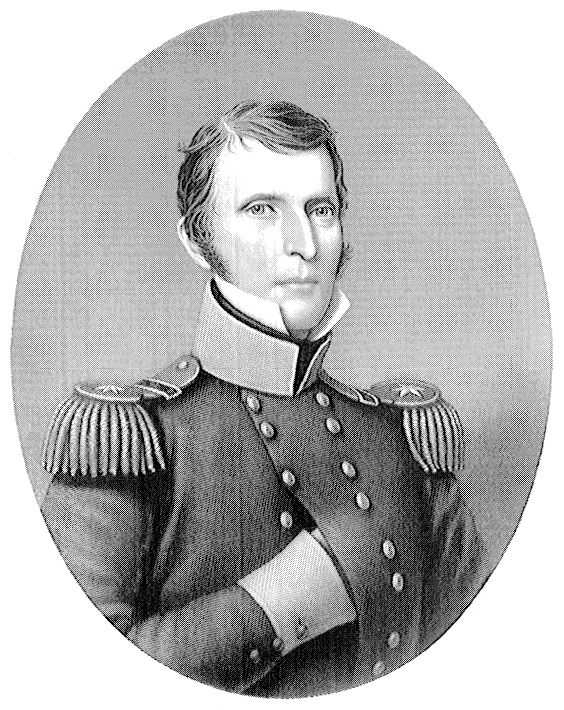
- General Henry Leavenworth
- Born: December 10, 1783; New Haven, Connecticut, U.S.
- Died: July 21, 1834 (aged 50); Cross Timbers, Indian Territory (near modern Kingston, Oklahoma, U.S.)
- Military career
- Allegiance: United States of America
- Branch: United States Army
- Service years: 1812–1834
- Rank: Brigadier general
- Conflicts: War of 1812, Battle of Niagara, Arikara War

Henry Leavenworth (December 10, 1783 – July 21, 1834) was an American soldier active in the War of 1812 and early military expeditions against the Native American people living on the plains. He established Fort Leavenworth in Kansas. The city of Leavenworth, Kansas; Leavenworth County, Kansas; and the Leavenworth Penitentiary are named after him.

== Early life and education ==
He was born at New Haven, Connecticut, a son of Col. Jesse and Catharine (Conklin) Leavenworth. Soon after his birth, his parents became alienated, and his father moved with the children to Danville, Vermont, where he was educated. He then read law with General Erastus Root of Delhi, New York, and upon being admitted to the bar, he formed a partnership with his preceptor that lasted until 1812.

== Military career ==
=== War of 1812 ===
Leavenworth was commissioned as a captain in the 25th U. S. Infantry in April 1812, shortly before the outbreak of the War of 1812. In August 1813 he was promoted to major of the 9th Infantry. He was wounded at the Battle of Niagara on July 25, 1814, and the following November, he was brevetted to the rank of colonel.

=== Post war ===
After the war, he then served in the New York State Assembly, in 1816, and then he went to Prairie du Chien as Indian agent, and on February 10, 1818, was made lieutenant-colonel of the Fifth U. S. Infantry. In 1820 he began constructing Fort St. Anthony from the Cantonment New Hope stockade.

=== Later career ===
In 1823, he led U.S. Army troops in the Arikara War, the first U.S. military expedition against a Great Plains Indian nation. While on duty in the West he built several military posts, one of which was Fort Leavenworth, Kansas, established May 8, 1827 as Cantonment Leavenworth, now one of the leading military establishments of the country. In 1825 he was made brigadier-general by brevet. In December 1825 he was promoted to the Regular Army rank of colonel and placed in command of the 3rd Infantry Regiment. During his time commanding the 3rd Infantry, he spent time at Jefferson Barracks near St. Louis, Missouri.

In 1834 he commanded the United States Regiment of Dragoons during its expedition from Fort Gibson, Indian Territory to the Wichita Mountains. The artist George Catlin was also in this expedition, and wrote of Leavenworth's death. They hoped to meet and open formal relations among the United States and the Comanche, Kiowa, and Wichita peoples.

== Death ==
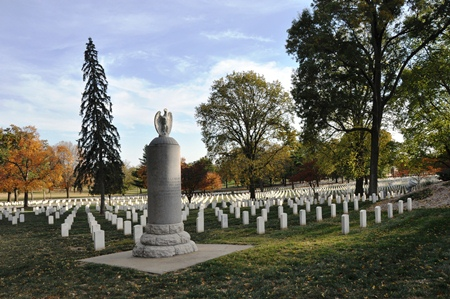
Fort Leavenworth National Cemetery, with Leavenworth's grave marker in the foreground

General Leavenworth died in the Cross Timbers in the Indian Territory, on land near modern Kingston, Oklahoma, on July 21, 1834, of either sickness or an accident while buffalo-hunting; while leading an expedition against the Pawnee and Comanche. His regiment erected a monument at Cross Timbers; he was first buried in Delhi, with his remains later reinterred at Fort Leavenworth National Cemetery.

== Marriages ==
He was married three times, first to Elizabeth Eunice Morrison, with whom he had two children, and divorced, then to Electa Knapp, who died within the year, then to Harriet Lovejoy, with whom he had another child. Lake Harriet in Minneapolis is named for Harriet Lovejoy.

His son Jesse Henry Leavenworth was also a military careerist.

== Legacy ==
In addition to Fort Leavenworth, Kansas, Leavenworth County, Kansas, the Leavenworth Penitentiary, Henry Leavenworth Elementary School, and Leavenworth Street in Omaha are named after him. The United States Disciplinary Barracks (USDB) at Fort Leavenworth is commonly called "Leavenworth".

== Dates of rank ==
- Captain, 25th Infantry - 25 April 1812
- Major, 9th Infantry - 15 August 1813
- Brevet Lieutenant Colonel - 5 July 1814
- Brevet Colonel - 25 July 1814
- Major, 2nd Infantry - 17 May 1815
- Lieutenant Colonel, 5th Infantry - 10 February 1818
- Lieutenant Colonel, 6th Infantry - 1 October 1821
- Brevet Brigadier General - 25 July 1824
- Colonel, 3rd Infantry - 16 December 1825

== See also ==
- First Dragoon Expedition - Describes both time and place of General Leavenworth's death
- Fort Snelling, Minnesota - Supported surveying fur trading routes and watersheds earlier in his career
