= Michigan Territory Militia =

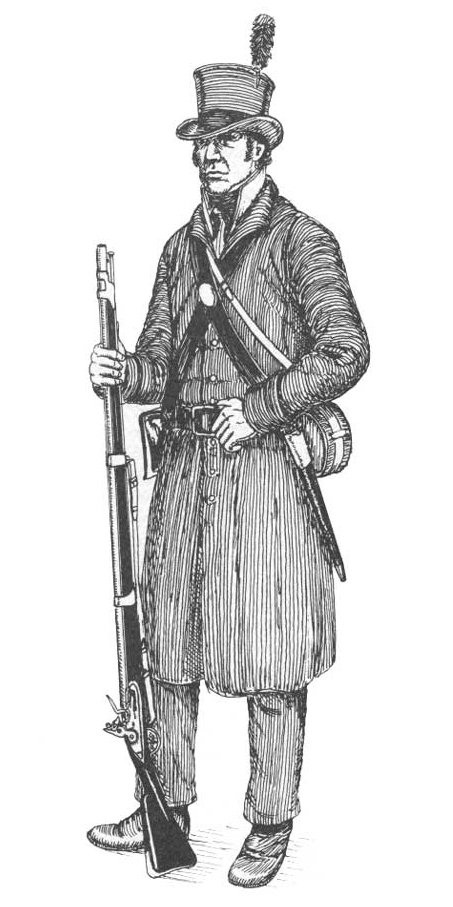
- Militiaman in Detroit during the War of 1812
- Active: 1805-1837
- Disbanded: 1837
- Country: United States
- Allegiance: Michigan Territory
- Branch: Militia
- Type: Infantry (1812); Dragoons (1832)
- Weapons: Rifle musket scalping knife tomahawk sword
- Engagements: War of 1812: Hull's Canadian Campaign (1812); Battle of River Canard (1812); Siege of Fort Mackinac (1812); Siege of Detroit (1812); Black Hawk War: Horseshoe Bend (1832); Wisconsin Heights (1832); Bad Axe (1832)

Commanders
- Commander in Chief: Governor of Michigan Territory

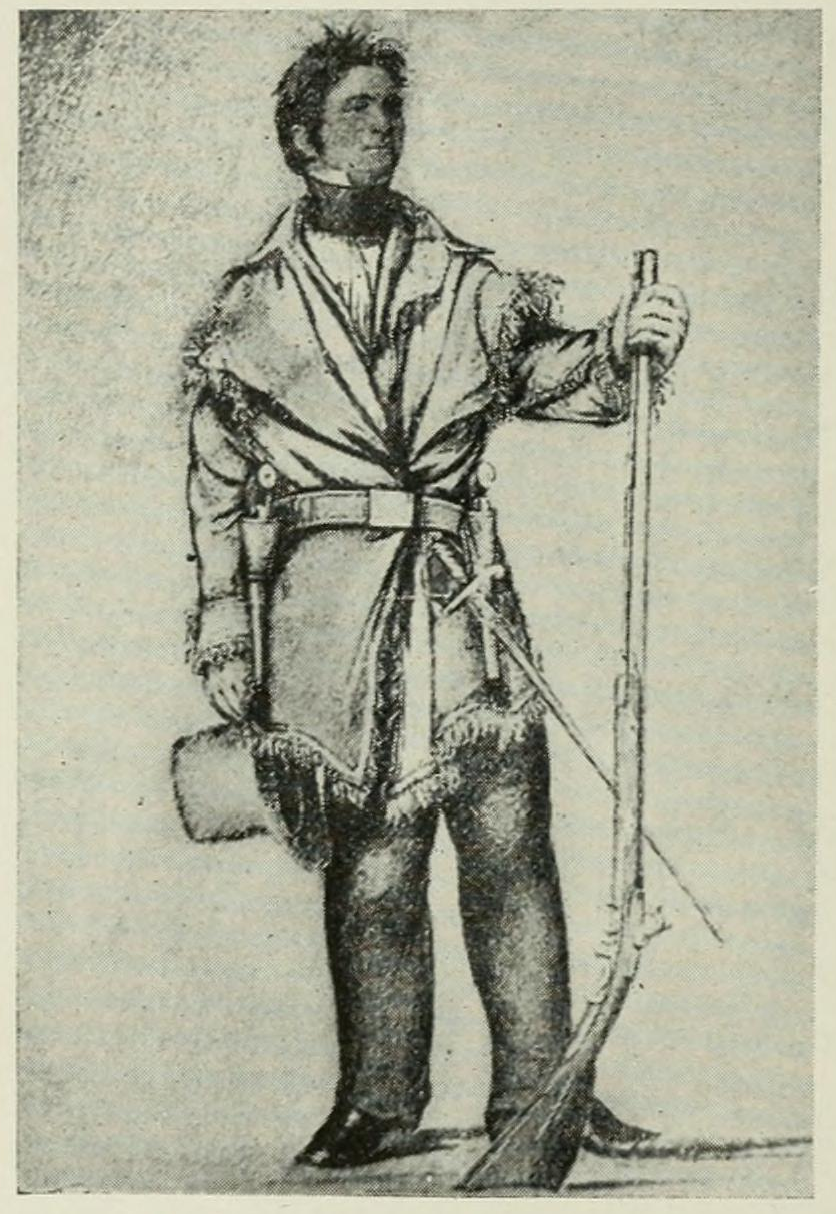
Colonel Henry Dodge was the commander of the Michigan Territory Militia in Wisconsin during the Black Hawk War of 1832, from a sketch by artist, George Catlin

The Michigan Territory Militia was the predecessor to the Michigan Army National Guard and existed from 1805 to 1837 as an entity concurrent with Michigan Territory's existence in the United States.

== Colonial and pre-Territorial militias ==
In the French colonial period, a proposal was made in 1708 to organize the first Michigan militia at Fort Detroit which is referenced in the Cadillac Papers. Following the defeat of the French regime, Michigan militias were also organized during British colonial occupation prior to the arrival of the Americans.

The earliest evidence of a formally organized American-style militia in pre-Territorial Michigan can be traced back to a militia unit participating in a Detroit parade on May 11, 1803. Michigan Territory was organized on June 30, 1805.

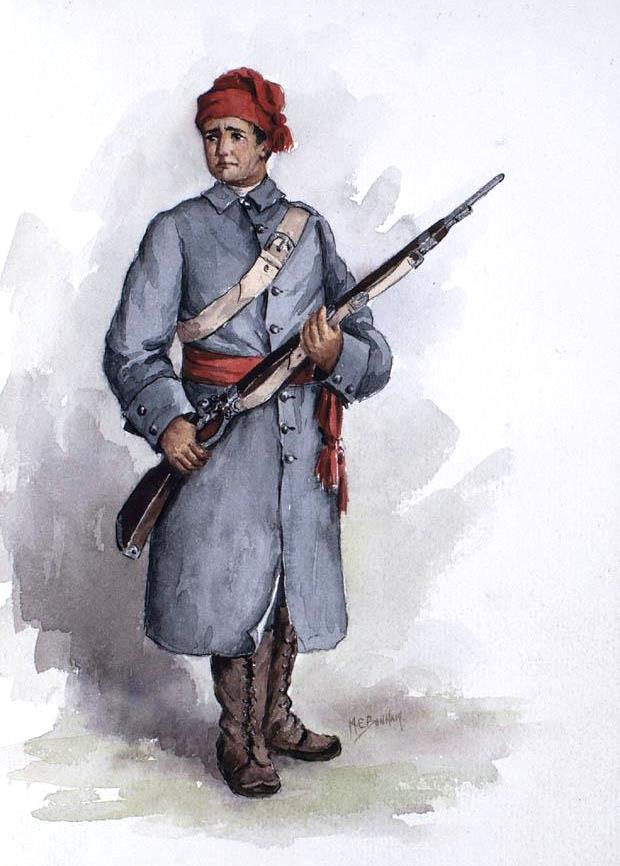
Pre-Territorial Michigan militias began in the 18th century with the formation of French Canadien civilians to help defend French colonialsettlements such as Fort Detroit which continued into the British colonial period

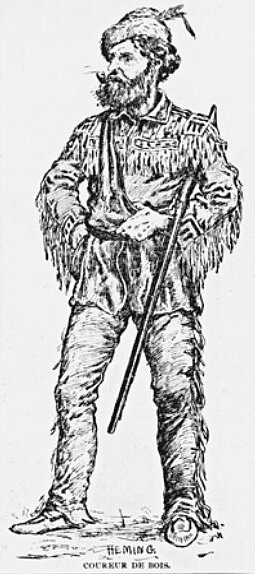
Pre-Territorial Michigan militias also consisted of French Canadien frontiersman known as coureur de bois who lived with and in the fur trade of the Native Americans in the Great Lakes region which continued into the British colonial period

== Territorial Militia ==
The official organization of the Michigan Territory in 1805 also included language that allowed for the creation of a militia.

== War of 1812 ==
The Michigan Territory Militia existed only on paper until the War of 1812.

== Black Hawk War ==
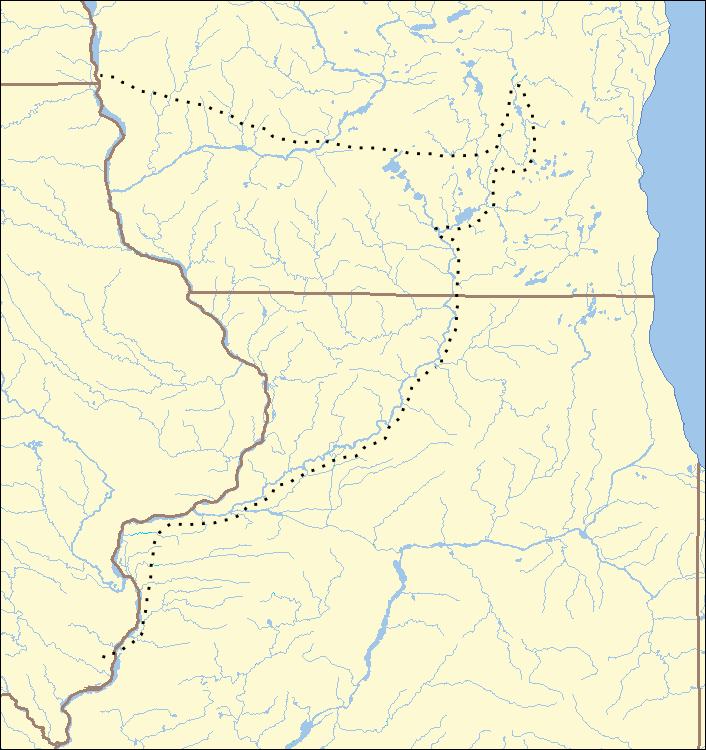
Map of Black Hawk War sites
Battle (with name) Fort / settlement Native village
Symbols are wikilinked to article

== Michigan Territory boundaries from 1805-1837 ==
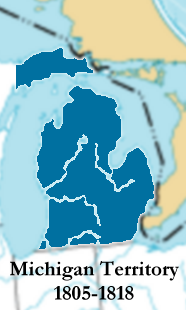
From 1805 to 1818, the western border was a line through Lake Michigan.

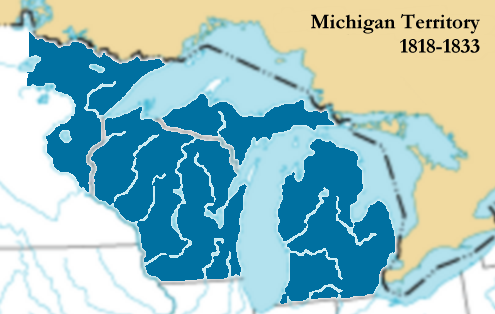
Between 1818 and 1833, Illinois and Indiana became states and the unincorporated land from their territories, plus a handful of other townships, was made part of Michigan Territory.

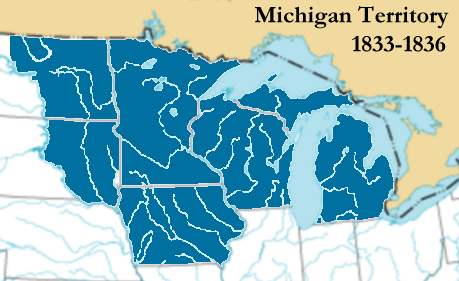
Between 1833 and 1836, all the remnants of the old Northwest Territory were part of the Michigan Territory along with portions of the Louisiana Purchase.

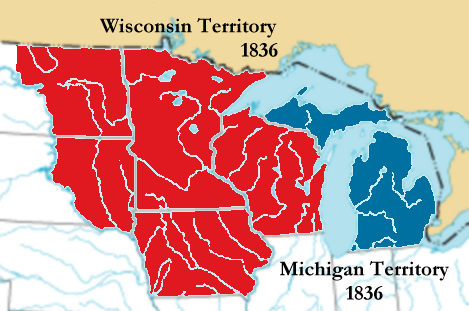
Michigan shrank in 1836 with the creation of the Wisconsin Territory. Wisconsin Territory was established in 1836 with the present boundary in the Upper Peninsula.
