= United States Mounted Rangers =

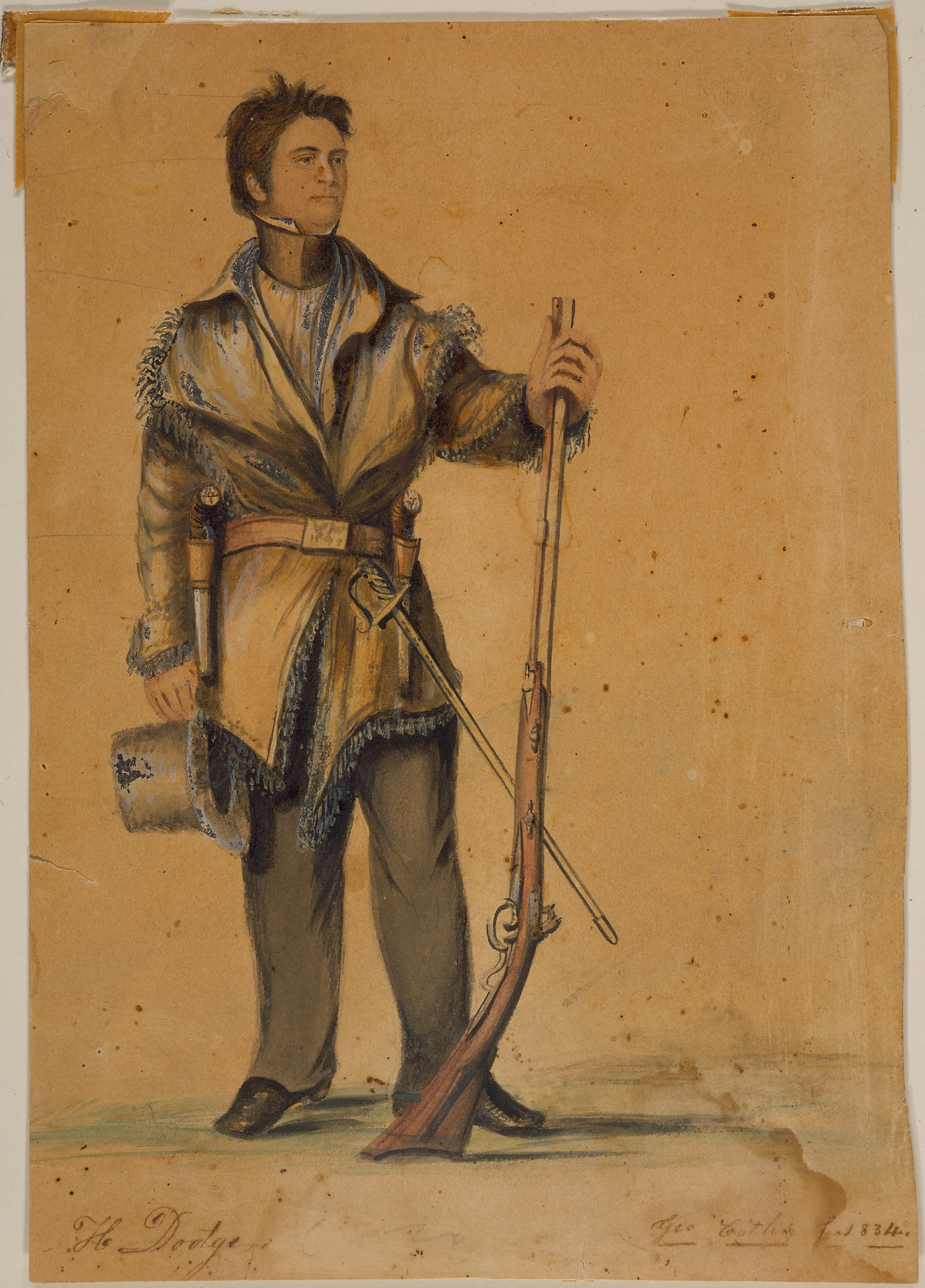
- A sketch of Henry Dodge in 1833 as the commander of the United States Mounted Rangers
- Active: 1832-1833
- Country: United States
- Allegiance: United States Army
- Branch: Cavalry
- Type: Light cavalry
- Role: Peacekeeping, Counterinsurgency
- Size: Battalion

Commanders
- Notable commanders: Major Henry Dodge

United States Mounted Rangers, or "Battalion of Mounted Rangers", was raised in 1832. The light cavalry unit operated on the frontier, but proving itself to be lacking in discipline, and being very costly, it was disbanded and replaced by a dragoon regiment in 1833.

== Formation ==
At the time of the formation of the Mounted Rangers, the United States Army lacked cavalry due to downsizing of the army after the War of 1812. The opening of the Santa Fe Trail led to demands for military escorts of the annual trading caravans across the prairies. In 1829 four infantry companies from Fort Leavenworth were ordered to protect that year's caravan. This expedition demonstrated the inferiority of foot soldiers against mounted Comanches. At the end of 1831, Senator Thomas Hart Benton of Missouri put forward a bill authorizing President Jackson to organize a mounted ranger unit of volunteers for frontier defense. The outbreak of the Black Hawk War meant that the bill was promptly passed by both houses of the Congress. The decision to organize a volunteer battalion instead of a regular cavalry regiment, emanated from the prevalent attitudes of the ruling Democratic Party toward the United States Army. The Regular Army was seen as a stronghold of aristocratic West Pointers in contrast with the virtuous citizen soldiers of the militia.

== Organization ==
The Mounted Rangers were organized into six companies, each with a captain, a first lieutenant, a second lieutenant, a third lieutenant, five sergeants, five corporals, and 100 private rangers. Henry Dodge was made a major and the commander; captains were Lemuel Ford, Benjamin V. Becks, Jesse B. Brown, Jesse Bean, Nathan Boone, and Matthew Duncan. The officers and NCOs were appointed directly from civilian life. The private rangers were hardened hunters, trappers, and other outdoorsmen, who were used to a rugged life. They enlisted for one year only, and had to supply their own mounts, horse tack, weapons, equipment, and clothing, and pay for their horses' forage. As compensation they received one dollar a day in addition to their pay.

== Assignments ==
Three companies were stationed at Fort Armstrong, Illinois, in the aftermath of the Black Hawk War. The three other companies were stationed at Fort Gibson, Indian Territory. Their mission was to support the Indian agents and negotiators under Henry Ellsworth that tried to mediate between the native population there and the members of the Five Civilized Tribes that had been removed beyond the Mississippi. One of the Fort Gibson companies were later moved to Fort Leavenworth, to fulfill the mounted rangers' intended mission of escorting caravans on the Santa Fe Trail.

== Disbandment ==
The Mounted Rangers were disbanded when the one-year enlistment period ended. The rangers had revealed themselves as lacking in discipline, and their leather hunting shirts had become so soiled that citizens and Indians could not separate them from common militia. When the Secretary of War, Lewis Cass, demonstrated that the battalion was more costly than a regular regiment of dragoons, the fate of the Mounted Rangers was sealed. The Congress decided to replace them with the "United States Regiment of Dragoons"; the commanding officer of the Mounted Rangers, Major Henry Dodge, becoming its colonel and first commander. Four captains and four lieutenants of the Mounted Rangers also becoming officers of the Dragoons.
