= Henry Dodge =

American politician and military officer

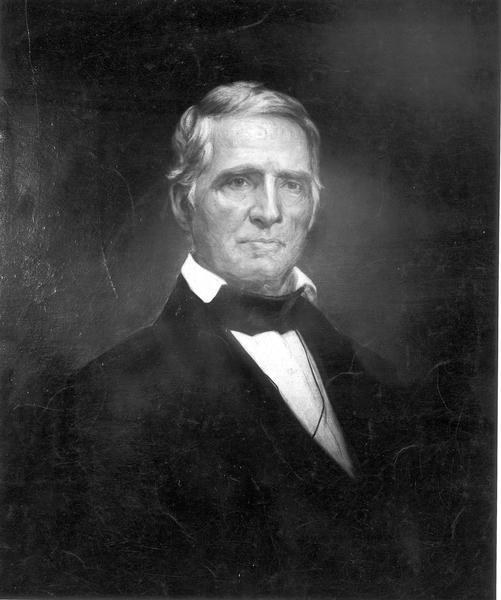
- Portrait of Dodge from the 1840s

United States Senator from Wisconsin
- In office June 8, 1848 – March 3, 1857
- Preceded by: Seat established
- Succeeded by: James Rood Doolittle

1st and 4th Governor of the Wisconsin Territory
- In office April 8, 1845 – June 23, 1848
- Appointed by: James Polk
- Preceded by: Nathaniel P. Tallmadge
- Succeeded by: John Catlin (Acting)
- In office April 30, 1836 – September 13, 1841
- Appointed by: Andrew Jackson
- Preceded by: Position established
- Succeeded by: James Duane Doty

Delegate to the U.S. House of Representatives from the Wisconsin Territory's at-large district
- In office March 4, 1841 – March 3, 1845
- Preceded by: James Duane Doty
- Succeeded by: Morgan Lewis Martin

Personal details
- Born: Moses Henry Dodge; October 12, 1782 Vincennes, Indiana, U.S.
- Died: June 19, 1867 (aged 84) Burlington, Iowa, U.S.
- Resting place: Aspen Grove Cemetery; Burlington, Iowa, U.S.
- Party: Democratic
- Spouse: Christiana McDonald (1800–1865)
- Children: 8, including Augustus
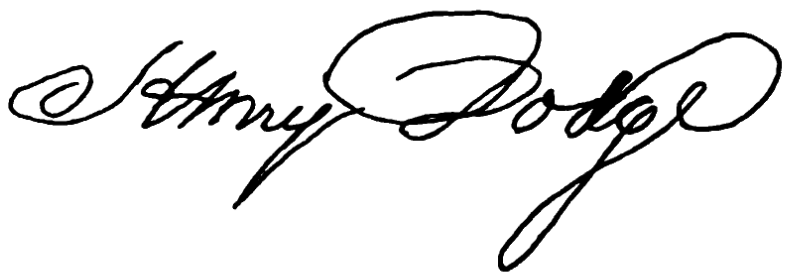
- Signature

Military service
- Allegiance: United States
- Branch/service: United States Army; Missouri Militia; Michigan Territorial Militia
- Rank: Major General (Militias); Colonel (U.S. Army)
- Unit: Missouri State Volunteers (1812–1814); Michigan Mounted Volunteers (1832); United States Mounted Ranger Battalion (1832–1833); United States Regiment of Dragoons (1833–1836)
- Battles/wars: War of 1812; Winnebago War; Black Hawk War; First Dragoon Expedition

Moses Henry Dodge (October 12, 1782 – June 19, 1867) was an American politician and military officer who was Democratic member to the U.S. House of Representatives and U.S. Senate, territorial governor of Wisconsin and a veteran of the Black Hawk War. His son, Augustus C. Dodge, served as a U.S. senator from Iowa; the two were the first and so far the only father-son pair to serve concurrently in the Senate, which they did from 1848 to 1855.

Henry Dodge was also the half-brother of Missouri Senator Lewis F. Linn. James Clarke, the governor of Iowa Territory, was his son-in-law.

Henry Dodge was also a slave owner, possessing the body and lives of five enslaved men - Toby, Tom, Lear, Jim, and Joe — who worked as smelters long after he promised to free them.

== Early life ==
Henry Dodge was the son of Israel Dodge and Nancy Hunter Dodge. Israel was from Connecticut and a veteran of the Battle of Brandywine, who came west to serve under his brother in the military command of George Rogers Clark. Nancy's family similarly moved west and settled in Kentucky, and for a period of time the Hunter family was part of the settler colony whose population was recruited to support the garrison at the confluence of the Ohio River and the Mississippi River, known as Fort Jefferson. Henry Dodge was born in Vincennes (then under the jurisdiction of Virginia) when Nancy stopped over to visit Israel (on duty in Vincennes) on her way from Kaskaskia to Louisville. Henry was the first child in what is now Indiana who was born to parents from the colonies, the other residents of Vincennes being of Indian and French Canadian heritage.

Dodge was raised in Kentucky. In 1788 Israel abandoned the family and Henry was raised by his mother. (Nancy later remarried, and had a son Lewis who himself became an elected official.) At age 14 Dodge moved to Missouri to live with his father, who ran salt and lead operations. Although Henry returned to Kentucky occasionally (including to read law), his move to Missouri was permanent. In 1800, he married Christiana McDonald.

In 1805 Dodge was appointed deputy sheriff, reporting to his father. In 1806 Dodge was recruited by Aaron Burr to participate in Burr's spurious attempt at creating a new country in the southwest, an incident known as the Burr conspiracy. Dodge and a companion went so far as to report to a concentration point for the affair in New Madrid. However, when they learned that Thomas Jefferson had deemed it a treasonous act, they immediately abandoned the effort and returned home. Dodge was indicted as a participant in the conspiracy, but the charges were dropped.

In 1806 Dodge was named lieutenant of the militia. In 1813 he was appointed U.S. Marshal, as well as Sheriff of Ste. Genevieve County.

== Career ==
=== War of 1812 ===
Dodge and the Miamis from a mural in the Missouri State Capitol

In the War of 1812, Dodge entered as a captain in the Missouri State Volunteers. He was part of a mounted company. He finished the war as a major general of the Missouri Militia. His crowning achievement was saving about 150 Miami Indians from certain massacre after their raid on the Boone's Lick settlement in the summer of 1814.

Dodge emigrated with his large family and slaves inherited from his father to the U.S. Mineral District in early July 1827. He served as a commander of militia during the Red Bird uprising of that year, and in October settled a large tract in present-day downtown Dodgeville, known then as "Dodge's Camp." He worked a large claim until around 1830, when he moved several miles south in a beautiful forested area known still as "Dodge's Grove." Here he began building what would become a large two-story frame house for his ever-growing extended family. It is worthy to note that, despite the Northwest Ordinance of 1787 banning slavery in the entire Northwest Territory, including Wisconsin, Dodge brought five black slaves from Missouri to work in his lead mines.

=== Black Hawk War ===
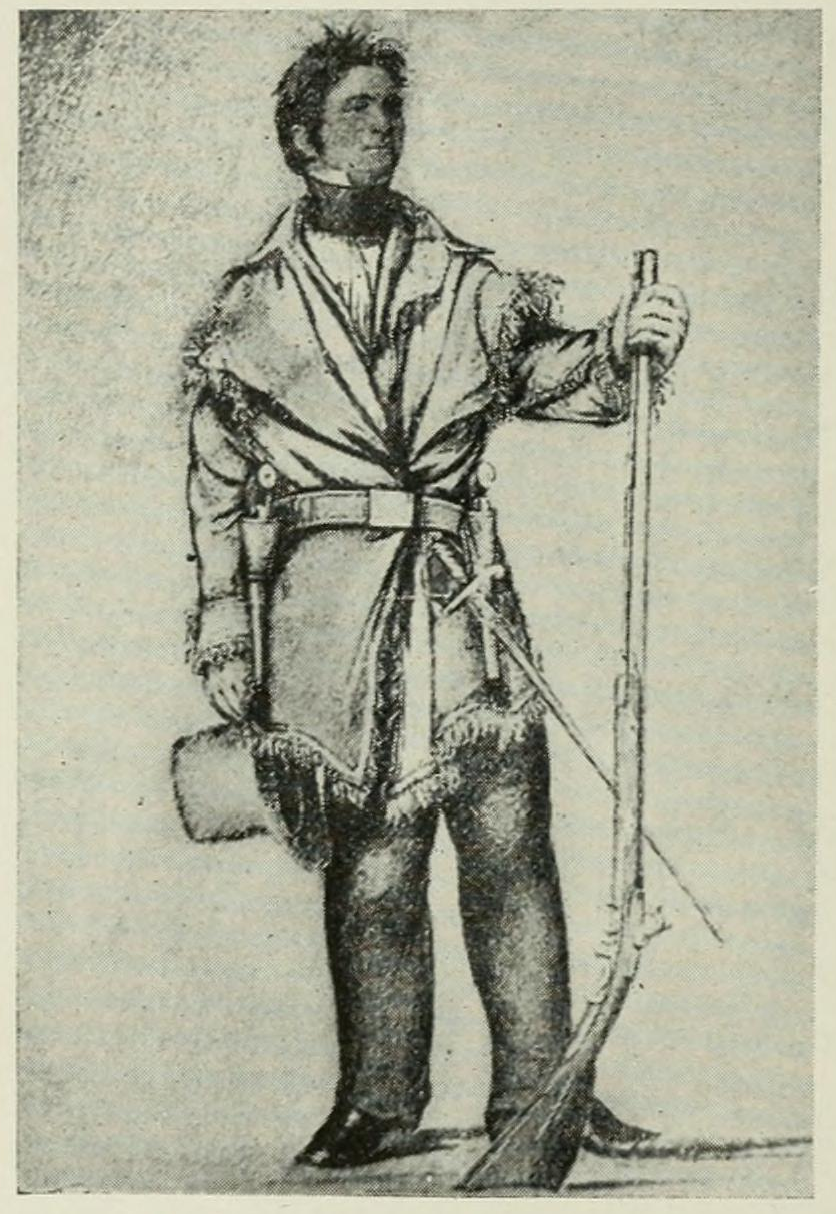
George Catlin sketch of Colonel Henry Dodge, commander of the United States Mounted Rangers, 1833.

Dodge rose to prominence during the Black Hawk War of 1832. As colonel of the western Michigan Territory Militia, Dodge brought a credible fighting force into being in a very short time. More than fifteen forts, fortified homes and blockhouses sprang up almost overnight. From these forts, Dodge and the mounted volunteers, with four companies of Territorial militia and one of Illinois mounted rangers, took to the field as the "Michigan Mounted Volunteers." Dodge and his men saw action at the battles of Horseshoe Bend, Wisconsin Heights, and Bad Axe. In June 1832, he accepted a commission as Major of the Battalion of Mounted Rangers, commissioned by an Act of Congress. Apparently, he took no prisoners. None of the 12 or 13 shot at Horseshoe Bend survived.

In the summer of 1832, he told a delegation of Ho-Chunk chiefs: "You will have your country taken from you, your annuity money will be forfeited, and the lives of your people lost." In the Battle of Bad Axe in August 1832, Dodge and his militia massacred or contributed to the massacre of nearly 1000 Sauk men, women, and children as they attempted to cross the Mississippi River South of La Crosse, Wisconsin.

=== United States Regiment of Dragoons ===
The ranger experiment lasted a year, and then, in 1833, was replaced by the United States Regiment of Dragoons. Dodge served as colonel; one of his captains was Nathan Boone, Daniel Boone's youngest son. The United States Regiment of Dragoons was the fourth mounted Regular Army unit in United States Army history, not including the American Revolution, Continental Light Dragoons.

In the summer of 1834, Colonel Dodge engaged on First Dragoon Expedition and made successful contact with the Comanches. He was an Indian fighter, most noted for his 1835 peace mission commissioned by President Andrew Jackson, who had called out the U.S. Dragoons to assist.

=== Territorial governor ===
Dodge was the first Territorial governor of Wisconsin Territory from 1836 to 1841 and again from 1845 to 1848, an area which encompassed (before July 4, 1838, when Iowa became a territory) what became the states of Wisconsin, Iowa and Minnesota. In between his two terms as governor, Dodge was elected as a non-voting Democratic delegate to the Twenty-seventh and Twenty-eighth Congresses (March 4, 1841 – March 3, 1845) representing Wisconsin Territory's at-large congressional district.

As territorial governor, Dodge was also Superintendent of the Wisconsin Superintendency of the Indian Agency. Under pressure not from settlers but from developers and businessmen interested in logging, he negotiated a treaty with Ojibwe from east central Minnesota east of the Mississippi and west of the St. Croix River and Ojibwe from west central Wisconsin starting at the east side of the St. Croix including St. Croix Falls and including the northern section of the Chippewa River to Chippewa Falls in July 1837, sometimes dubbed "the Pine Tree Treaty." The U.S. would allow the Ojibwe to remain on the land and retain their rights to fish, hunt, and gather, but ironically the land would be surveyed and sold as well. Payments would only be for twenty years. The Ojibwe were told that they would have to move at an undetermined time in the future and could only stay "at the pleasure of the President."

Dodge declined the opportunity to have his name put forward for the Presidency of the United States at the 1844 Democratic National Convention. He was loyal to Martin Van Buren and both men opposed the annexation of Texas. Despite their efforts, James K. Polk, the Democrat who favored annexation, became president.

Upon Wisconsin being admitted to the Union in 1848, Dodge was elected one of its first two senators. He served two terms. He turned down the appointment of Territorial Governor of Washington from Franklin Pierce in 1857.

== Death ==
Dodge died in 1867 in Burlington, Iowa. He is interred at the Aspen Grove Cemetery in Burlington.

== Legacy ==
In 1948, Iowa County presented a 160-acre estate to the State of Wisconsin which eventually became Governor Dodge State Park. Over the years, this park has grown to include 5,270 acres in the area Dodge once called his home.

Dodge County, Wisconsin, Dodge County, Minnesota, Henry County, Iowa, Dodgeville, Wisconsin, and Fort Dodge, Iowa were named after Dodge.

Fort Clark, the U.S. Army post built near the present-day location of Fort Dodge, Iowa, was renamed for Senator Dodge around 1850.

His former cabin in Dodgeville, now known as the Dodge Mining Camp Cabin, serves as a museum and is listed on the National Register of Historic Places.

== Other reading ==
- "Eulogy on Gen. Henry Dodge". Wisconsin Historical Collections. 5. State Historical Society of Wisconsin: 173–177. 1868.
- Wheelock, T.B. (1860). "Journal of Colonel Dodge's Expedition from Fort Gibson to Pawnee Pict Village, August 26, 1834". American State Papers. Documents, Legislative and Executive, Congress of the United States, from the 1st Session of the 22nd to the 1st Session of the 24th Congress, Inclusive, Commencing March 15, 1832, and Ending January 5, 1836. Class V Military Affairs. Volume V. Washington: Gales and Seaton. pp. 373–382.
- Houck, Louis (1908). A History of Missouri, Vol. III. Chicago: R. R. Donnelley & Sons.
- "Henry Dodge. Colonel U.S. Dragoons 1833-6. Part I". Iowa Historical Record. VII (3). Iowa State Historical Society: 101–119. 1891.
- "Henry Dodge. Colonel U.S. Dragoons 1833-6. Part II". Iowa Historical Record. VIII (2). Iowa State Historical Society: 251–267. 1892.
- "Henry Dodge. Colonel U.S. Dragoons 1833-6. Part III". Iowa Historical Record. VIII (3). Iowa State Historical Society: 297–316. 1892.
- Salter, William (1885). "A Heroine of the Revolution: Nancy Ann Hunter". Iowa Historical Record. II (2). Iowa State Historical Society: 258–264.

U.S. House of Representatives
Preceded by James Duane Doty	Delegate to the U.S. House of Representatives from the Wisconsin Territory's at-large congressional district 1841–1845	Succeeded by Morgan Lewis Martin
Political offices
New office	Governor of the Wisconsin Territory; 1836–1841	Succeeded by James Duane Doty
Preceded by Nathaniel P. Tallmadge	Governor of the Wisconsin Territory; 1845–1848	Succeeded by John Catlin; Acting
U.S. Senate
New seat	U.S. Senator (Class 1) from Wisconsin; 1848–1857; Served alongside: Isaac P. Walker, Charles Durkee	Succeeded by James Rood Doolittle
Preceded by Hannibal Hamlin	Chair of the Senate Commerce Committee; 1856–1857	Succeeded by Clement Clay
Honorary titles
Preceded by William Wilkins	Oldest living U.S. senator 1865–1867	Succeeded by Wilson Lumpkin
