= Oliver Lee Memorial State Park =

State park in New Mexico, United States

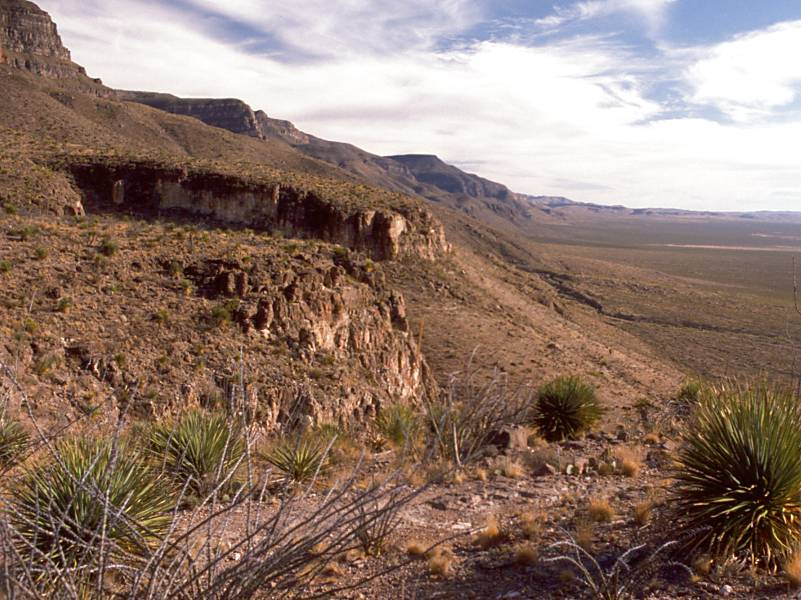
- The western escarpment of the Sacramento Mountains, looking south at sunset from the Dog Canyon Trail

- Location within New Mexico
- Location: Otero County, New Mexico, United States
- Coordinates: 32°44′51″N 105°55′05″W
- Area: 640 acres (260 ha)
- Elevation: 4,400 ft (1,300 m)
- Established: 1980
- Administrator: New Mexico Energy, Minerals and Natural Resources Department
- Website: Official website

Oliver Lee Memorial State Park is a state park of New Mexico, United States, whose two tracts preserve a canyon in the Sacramento Mountains and Oliver Lee's historic 19th-century ranch house. The 640-acre (260 ha) park is located in Otero County at an elevation of 4,400 feet (1,300 m). It is situated at the base of Dog Canyon and provides opportunities for camping, hiking, picnicking, wildlife viewing, a nature trail, and guided tours of the ranch house.

The Dog Canyon National Recreational Trail climbs to provide views of the Tularosa Basin and the Organ Mountains. Nearby are the community of Alamogordo and White Sands National Park. Oliver Lee Memorial State Park was established in 1980.

== History ==
Oliver Lee Memorial State Park consists of two separate parcels of land. Both parcels are historically significant. The Dog Canyon tract was used by Apache warriors as a defensive position and a base of operations during their numerous battles and wars with Euro-American explorers and settlers. Oliver Lee's homestead near the mouth of Dog Canyon was built in 1893. Lee was an influential and controversial citizen of New Mexico's settlement. The ranch is now a historic site and demonstrates how the ranch home looked while Lee was living there. As a well known rancher Lee was able to use his political influence to bring the railroad to nearby Alamogordo in 1898 and establish financial connections with influential citizens in El Paso, Texas. Lee was a known associate of Albert B. Fall and once engaged in an ineffectual gun fight with Pat Garrett. The second and northern parcel of land, has been studied extensively by archaeologists to determine the cultural history of the area.

=== Native Americans ===
Oliver Lee Memorial State Park is situated in the Chihuahuan Desert. The Otero County area of New Mexico receives very little rain with an average yearly rainfall of just 11.6 inches (290 mm). The fact that a perennially flowing stream of water passes through Dog Canyon made it an important location for settlement by Native Americans that lived in, and travelled through the Tularosa Basin.

The earliest known people to live in the area of the park were Paleoindians. They lived in the area from 9500 BC to about 5500 BC. They hunted a variety of now extinct animals like the Mammoth and large bison. Evidence of their existence at the park include fluted projectile points and evidence of time-period campsites.

The Paleoindians were followed by peoples of the Archaic period from 5500 BC to 200 AD. These people were more sedentary than the Paleoindians as evidenced by remnants of plant processing. The Archaics hunted animals and gathered plants for food. They were followed during the Formative period 200 - 1400 by the Jornada Mogollon peoples. The Jornada Mogollons were farmers that lived in villages and practiced a combination of dry-land and flood-land agriculture. Archaeologists have found ground stones, ceramics, projectile points, rock pueblo ruins, pithouses and rock art that are consistent with the cultural practices of the Jornada Mogollans.

The Mescalero Apache established their dominance in the Tularosa Basin area by 1400. They were a mobile tribe that lived in tipis and subsisted on foods they both hunted and gathered. They also left behind projectile points. Other evidence of their time in the area includes drills, spears and stone axes. These Apache were the Indians that were encountered by Spanish explorers and later Anglo-American settlers. The Apache were highly territorial and defended their lands from incursion by settlers from Mexico and the southwestern territories of the United States.

=== Early settlers ===
The Apache were eventually forced from their lands by the forces of the United States. The Oliver Lee Memorial State Park area saw numerous conflicts between the Apache and Anglo-Americans from 1848 until 1912. The U.S. military and the Mescaleros had many confrontations within Dog Canyon itself over this time period during the Apache Wars.

In February 1858, Lieutenant H. M. Lazelle attacked the Mescalero Apache in retaliation for a cattle raid on San Elizario, and was defeated. Lazelle reported that of his 22-man party three were killed and seven wounded in the skirmish in Dog Canyon.

The first homestead in the area was established by François-Jean Rochas in 1885. He built his home at the mouth of Dog Canyon. He lived in a two-room rock and adobe home. Rochas planted an orchard and built retaining walls on the ridges that flank the canyon. His home is marked by a partly reconstructed cabin on the interpretive trail that is west of the park's visitor center.

The park's namesake, Oliver Milton Lee, arrived in the area from Buffalo Gap, Texas in 1893. He established a 320-acre (130 ha) ranch on land just south of Dog Canyon. Lee built a ranch house, barns, corrals, reservoir and slaughterhouse on his land. He also developed an irrigation system that provided water for his ranch from the stream in the canyon. Remnants of the water system can be seen at the park. Oliver Lee later held office in the New Mexico Senate and continued operating his ranches until his own death in 1941. He was able to use his political influence to improve the area by bringing the railroad to Alamogordo in 1898.

Lee sold his ranch in 1907. After a series of several owners, the ranch lands were made a part of the White Sands National Monument in 1939. Management of the 440-acre (180 ha) Dog Canyon tract was transferred to the State Parks Division in 1983, three years after the establishment of the parcel to the north of the canyon. Ownership of the southern part of the park was transferred to the state of New Mexico in 1998.

=== Albert Jennings Fountain murder case ===
The range war came to a boil in the winter of 1895-6. Colonel Fountain had gone to the Lincoln County court and obtained 32 indictments against 23 ranchers for theft of livestock or defacement of brands. Oliver Lee, Jim Gililland and William McNew were among the accused. This caused their being suspects in the February 1896 disappearance and presumed murder of Colonel Fountain and his 8-year-old son Henry. They were pursued by Sheriff Pat Garrett and a posse. Garrett and posse engaged in a gunbattle with Lee and Gililland near Alamogordo at Wildy Well, with Deputy Sheriff Kurt Kearney being killed. Lee later testified that Kearney and Garrett shot at Lee and Gililland, who were sleeping on the roof of the house at Wildy Well. Lee claimed the two were fired upon without being given the option to surrender, with him and Gililland returning fire. After Deputy Kearney was shot, Sheriff Garrett negotiated a truce and retreated with the mortally wounded Kearney.

It was almost three years before the matter was settled in court. These events led to the political maneuvering which led to the formation of Otero County. Lee believed that if he surrendered to Garrett he would never make it to trial. This is attested to in Dee Harkey's book "The Life of a New Mexico Lawman - Mean as Hell" (ISBN 0-941270-60-2). Lee's friend, Albert Fall and other Democrats offered to honor Otero, the Republican Governor, with the creation of a county named after him. The boundary of this new county would put the location, and so the jurisdiction of the Fountain case, in the new county. The only thing the Democrats wanted in exchange was that the sheriff of the new county would be their choice. Once the county was established and Lee's friend, George Curry was appointed sheriff, Lee promptly surrendered. Albert Fall and others defended Lee, McNew and Gilliland, who were charged with and tried in Hillsboro, New Mexico, for the crime of killing Henry Fountain (Albert's young son). No one was ever charged with the murder of Albert Fountain. Charges against McNew were dismissed, while Lee and Gililland were acquitted. Dee Harkey notes that it was interesting that none of the other ranchers indicted were ever pursued as suspects.

Oliver Lee later held office in the New Mexico Senate and continued operating his ranches until his own death in 1941. He has several descendants still living and ranching in New Mexico.

As told by Jim Gililland's great niece Viola Smith-Hobbs, "Uncle Jim was a hired gun for Oliver Lee. He and Oliver Lee were accused of killing Colonel Albert J. Fountain and his son, Henry, at Chalk Hill, New Mexico at the point of the White Sands. The feud was over politics and a range war."

== Geology ==
Oliver Lee Memorial State Park is at the base of the western escarpment of the Sacramento Mountains of New Mexico. It contains Dog Canyon and land to the north of the canyon. The canyon is bisected by a perennial stream, a rarity in the Chihuahuan Desert.

The Sacramento Mountains are a mountain range lying just east of Alamogordo in Otero County (small portions of the range are in Lincoln County and Chaves County). From north to south, the Sacramento Mountains extend for 85 miles (137 km), and from east to west they encompass 42 miles (68 km). Dog Canyon is one of several canyons found on the west side of the mountains. The canyon and cliff faces show the geologic history of the park stretching from the Ordovician times (570 million years ago) to the Permian times (300 million years ago). Evidence of marine life in the area points to a time period when the land was covered by a shallow sea. The rocks contain fossils of nautiloid cephalopods. Native Americans used chert that was left behind as the seas receded to make stone tools. Rocks from the Mississippian age show continental shelf deposits and reef-like remains of fossilized crinoids, bryozoans and dense limestone. The Sacramentos underwent a volcanic time during the Tertiary Period (30 million years ago). The volcanic forces created igneous sills into the rocks from the Devonian Period.

Oliver Lee Memorial State Park is on the edge of the Tularosa Basin. Hydrologically, the Tularosa Basin is a closed basin; no streams flow out. Surface water that doesn't evaporate or soak into the ground eventually accumulates at intermittent lakes. The basin covers about 6,500 square miles (16,800 km^{2}). It was formed 25 million years ago by faults that caused the surrounding mountains to fall and the basin to sink.

Dog Canyon was carved into the basin fill materials of sand, silt and clay by heavy runoffs of earth and water from the surrounding mountains. The heavy rocks and fast moving waters carved the canyon out over millions of years. Lake Otero was formed by heavy snowmelt and rains during the late Pleistocene. About 20,00 years ago the climate changed. As the temperatures rose Lake Otero began to evaporate. Parts of the ancient lake can be found in Lake Lucero, Alkali Flat playa and the gypsum dunes of White Sands National Park.

== Water, flora and fauna ==
Water is a vital resource in the Chihuahuan Desert. The stream found in Dog Canyon has created a riparian environment in Oliver Lee Memorial State Park that is unique for the area. The stream is kept flowing by rain and snow-melt. The water seeps up from the ground in springs that naturally occur in the limestone formations of the park. The stream dries out just to the west of the park and the remaining water flows underground. It supports a small variety of insects and amphibians, but no fish.

Trees found along the stream include Rio Grande cottonwood (Populus deltoides wislizeni), New Mexico locust (Robinia neomexicana), and velvet ash (Fraxinus velutina). In the areas away from the stream one-seeded juniper (Juniperus monosperma), desert willow (Chilopsis linearis) and netleaf hackberry (Celtis reticulata) are found. Shrubs of the park include four-wind saltbush (Atriplex canescens) and creosote bush (Larrea tridentata. Wild grapes (Vitis arizonica) and western poison ivy (Toxicodendron rydbergii) can be found in the cool and wetter parts of Dog Canyon. A variety of cacti species can be found in the park including strawberry hedgehog (Echinocereus fendleri), cane cholla (Opuntia imbricata) and numerous prickly pears (Opuntia spp.). Aquatic plants like cattail (Typha angustifolia), giant helleborine (Epipactis gigantea) and maidenhair fern (Adiantum capillus-veneris) are sustained by the stream that flows through the canyon.

Oliver Lee Memorial State Park is home to mammals that are typically found in the upper Chihuahuan Desert. They include collared peccary, ground squirrels, mule deer, black-tailed jackrabbit and the desert cottontail. These are prey to predators like American black bears, cougars, and bobcats. American badgers, North American porcupines, raccoon, White-nosed coati and several species of bats and skunks are also found in the desert of the park. Two species of rattlesnakes are found in the park, western diamondback and black-tail. Several species of lizards, skinks, geckos, turtles, and non-venomous snakes can be found in the park. The Texas horned lizard, which is threatened by loss of habitat, pesticides and development in Texas and Oklahoma, is thriving in the park. The horned lizards are legally protected in the park and throughout New Mexico. Known amphibians found in the park include salamanders and toads. The park is also home to birds such as turkey vultures, red-tailed hawks, mourning doves, hummingbirds, warblers and wrens.

== Recreation ==
Oliver Lee Memorial State Park is open for year-round recreation. Recreational opportunities include hiking, camping, picnicking and wildlife viewing. There are two trails at the park. Dog Canyon Trail begins at the visitor center and climbs the canyon walls over a distance of 5.5 miles (8.9 km) and rising 3,144 feet (958 m). At the top of the canyon the trail enters the neighboring Lincoln National Forest. An interpretive trail at the park allow visitors to access the riparian environment along the stream in the canyon.
