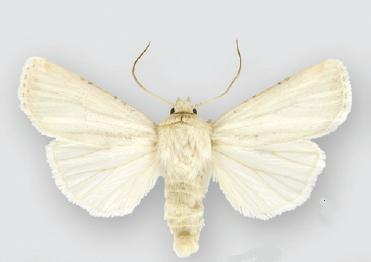
- Euxoa lafontainei (male)

Scientific classification
- Kingdom: Animalia
- Phylum: Arthropoda
- Clade: Pancrustacea
- Class: Insecta
- Order: Lepidoptera
- Superfamily: Noctuoidea
- Family: Noctuidae
- Genus: Euxoa
- Species: E. lafontainei

Binomial name
- Euxoa lafontainei Metzler & Forbes, 2009

= Euxoa lafontainei =

Species of moth

Euxoa lafontainei is a moth of the family Noctuidae. It is found in White Sands National Monument, Otero County, New Mexico. It is named for J. Donald Lafontaine.

The length of the forewings is 13–15 mm.
