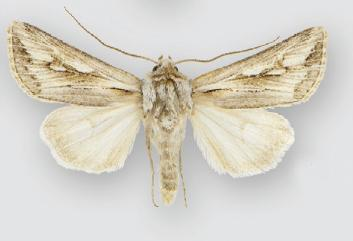
- Protogygia biclavis (male)

Scientific classification
- Kingdom: Animalia
- Phylum: Arthropoda
- Clade: Pancrustacea
- Class: Insecta
- Order: Lepidoptera
- Superfamily: Noctuoidea
- Family: Noctuidae
- Genus: Protogygia
- Species: P. biclavis

Binomial name
- Protogygia biclavis Grote, 1879

Synonyms
- Protogygia demutabilis

= Protogygia biclavis =

Species of moth

Protogygia biclavis is a moth of the family Noctuidae. It is found in the White Sands National Park, Otero County, New Mexico as well as California, Utah and Arizona.

The wingspan is about 30 mm.
