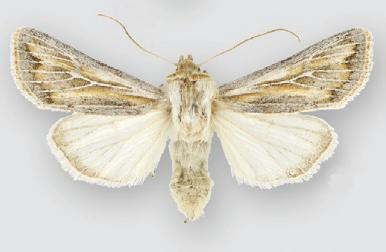
- Protogygia comstocki (female)

Scientific classification
- Domain: Eukaryota
- Kingdom: Animalia
- Phylum: Arthropoda
- Class: Insecta
- Order: Lepidoptera
- Superfamily: Noctuoidea
- Family: Noctuidae
- Genus: Protogygia
- Species: P. comstocki

Binomial name
- Protogygia comstocki McDunnough, 1934

= Protogygia comstocki =

Species of moth

Protogygia comstocki is a moth of the family Noctuidae. It is found in the White Sands National Park, Otero County, New Mexico as well as the Hanford Central and Wahluke dunes in Washington.
