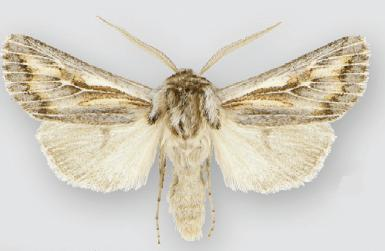
- Protogygia pectinata (male)

Scientific classification
- Kingdom: Animalia
- Phylum: Arthropoda
- Clade: Pancrustacea
- Class: Insecta
- Order: Lepidoptera
- Superfamily: Noctuoidea
- Family: Noctuidae
- Genus: Protogygia
- Species: P. pectinata

Binomial name
- Protogygia pectinata Lafontaine, 2004

= Protogygia pectinata =

Species of moth

Protogygia pectinata is a moth of the family Noctuidae, first described by J. Donald Lafontaine in 2004. It has been collected in Emery and Grand counties in Utah. The name pectinata (from Latin: pectinatus, lit. 'combed') is taken from the male's bipectinate antennae.
