= Protogygia enalaga =

Scientific classification
- Domain: Eukaryota
- Kingdom: Animalia
- Phylum: Arthropoda
- Class: Insecta
- Order: Lepidoptera
- Superfamily: Noctuoidea
- Family: Noctuidae
- Tribe: Noctuini
- Subtribe: Agrotina
- Genus: Protogygia
- Species: P. enalaga

Binomial name
- Protogygia enalaga McDunnough, 1932

Species of moth

Protogygia enalaga is a species of cutworm or dart moth in the family Noctuidae. It is found in North America.

The MONA or Hodges number for Protogygia enalaga is 10893.
