= White Sands footprints =

Fossilized human footprints in New Mexico, US

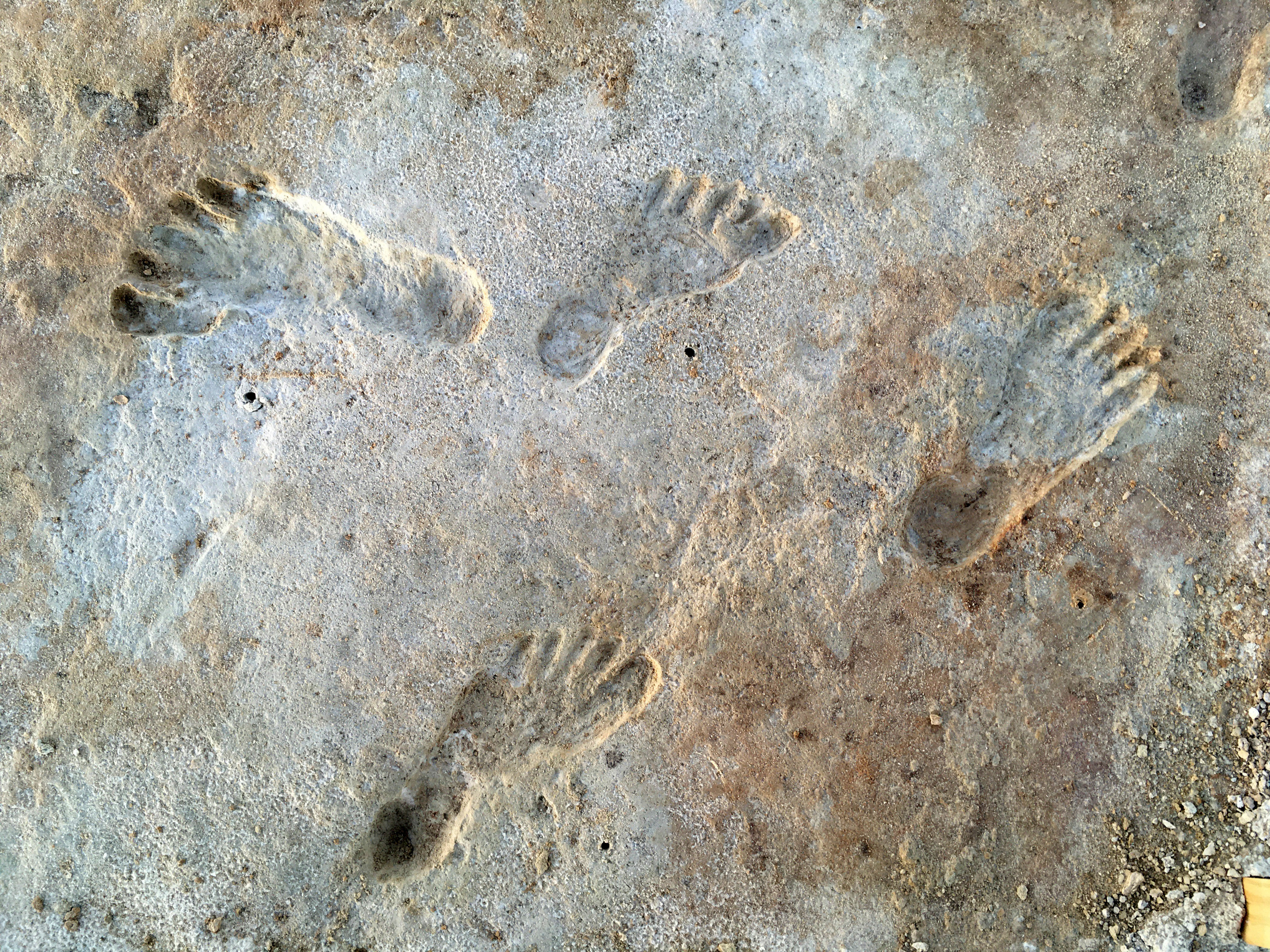
Ancient footprints from White Sands National Park

The White Sands footprints are a set of ancient human footprints discovered in 2009 at White Sands National Park in New Mexico, United States. In 2021 they were radiocarbon dated, based on seeds found in the sediment layers, to between 21,000 and 23,000 years ago. That date range is currently the subject of scientific debate, but if it is correct, the footprints would be possibly the oldest evidence of humans in the Americas. The earlier theory held that human settlement of the Americas began at the end of the last glacial period, about 13,000–16,000 years ago.

== Description ==
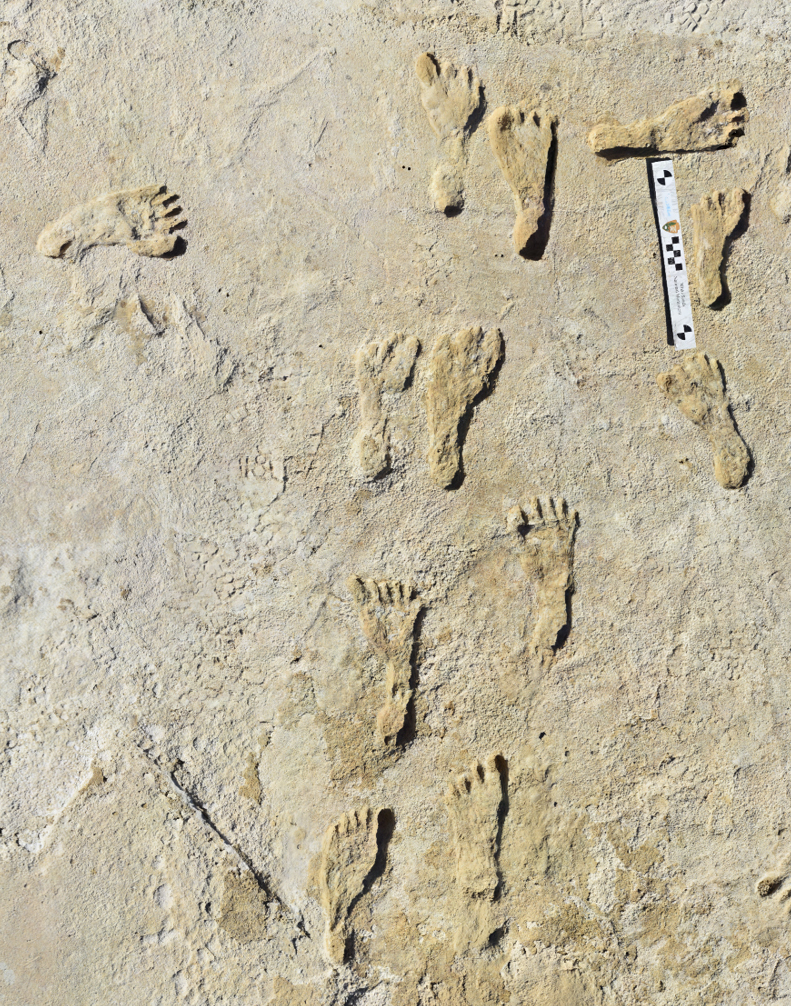
More footprints from White Sands National Park

The 61 footprints are located at the shore of a dried up ice age era lake, Lake Otero in the Tularosa Basin. The prints were laid on the shores of the now-dry lake at a time when the climate in the region was less arid. Instead of being a desert of gypsum dunes, the region had extensive grasslands and abundant vegetation.

The prints were found in seven soil layers and provide evidence of human occupation spanning approximately 2,000 years. The prints have "good anatomical definition (i.e. visible heel impressions, medial longitudinal arches and toe pads)". They are flatter-footed than those that are left by people who habitually wear shoes and, in this respect, are similar to ancient footprints found in Namibia. Other tracks include those of extinct megafauna, such as Columbian mammoths and ground sloths, as well as those of predators such as the American lion and dire wolves.

== Interpreting the prints ==
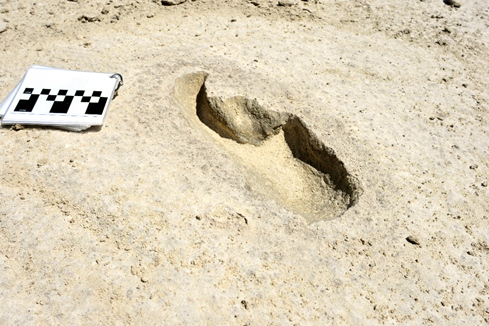
Footprint of a giant ground sloth found in White Sands National Park

The prints provide several insights into the lives of the peoples who made them. First, one set of prints appears to show human hunters tracking a giant sloth. Variations in the tracks left by the sloth show that it stood on its hind legs and spun around, possibly showing fear, but there is no evidence that the hunt was successful.

Second, another set of prints seems to have been laid by a woman or adolescent male, walking with a very young child for over a mile. It appears that the older person sometimes carried the child and then set it down, slipping as he or she carried the additional weight. The older person made a round trip journey while leaving the toddler at the destination which suggests human habitation at multiple locations in the White Sands area. Between the outbound and return legs of the trip, a mammoth crossed their track without changing course or showing signs of concern about their presence.

Third, the vast majority of the prints were made by teenagers and children, with few large adult footprints being found in any of the excavated surfaces. One explanation of this finding is that the teenagers and children were assigned tasks such as 'fetching and carrying' near the lake bed, whereas the adults were engaged elsewhere in more skilled activities.

It is thought that, counting both human and animal tracks, there are hundreds of thousands of fossilized footprints in the White Sands area. A report by the United States National Park Service states that the "fossilized footprints of White Sands are probably the most important resources in the Americas to understand the interaction of humans and extinct animals from the ice age."

== Controversy about dating ==
In 2022, skeptics noted that age estimates relied on carbon dating Ruppia cirrhosa seeds, whose parent plants can intake older carbon from groundwater, thereby potentially resulting in dates thousands of years too old. A study accounting for this effect suggested that the maximum age of the footprints is likely only 15,500–13,500 in calibrated years Before Present, which is similar to the dates found for many other archaeological sites across the Americas.

A 2023 study that included radiocarbon dating of pollen and optically stimulated luminescence dating of quartz grains within the footprint layers corroborated the original dates obtained from the seeds. However, these dates have also been considered uncertain by other authors, who suggest that they represent maximum ages. In particular, a study published in 2024 sets forth several concerns about the methodology used to obtain the earlier dates.

A 2025 study based on radiocarbon dating of the mud in which the prints were set, performed by two independent labs, provided an estimate for the White Sands footprints site of >23,600-17,000 calibrated years Before Present. Nonetheless, the dates are still matter of ongoing debate in academia.
