= Protogygia milleri =

Scientific classification
- Kingdom: Animalia
- Phylum: Arthropoda
- Class: Insecta
- Order: Lepidoptera
- Superfamily: Noctuoidea
- Family: Noctuidae
- Genus: Protogygia
- Species: P. milleri

Binomial name
- Protogygia milleri (Grote, 1876)

Species of moth

Protogygia milleri is a species of cutworm or dart moth in the family Noctuidae. It is found in North America.

The MONA or Hodges number for Protogygia milleri is 10898.
