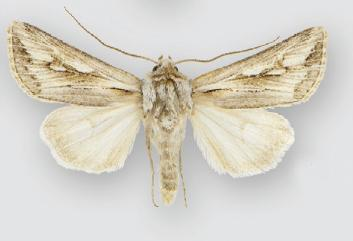
- Protogygia biclavis

Scientific classification
- Domain: Eukaryota
- Kingdom: Animalia
- Phylum: Arthropoda
- Class: Insecta
- Order: Lepidoptera
- Superfamily: Noctuoidea
- Family: Noctuidae
- Subtribe: Agrotina
- Genus: Protogygia; McDunnough, 1929

= Protogygia =

Genus of moths

Protogygia is a genus of moths of the family Noctuidae.

== Species ==
- Protogygia alberta Troubridge & Lafontaine, 2004
- Protogygia album (Harvey, 1876)
- Protogygia arena Troubridge & Lafontaine, 2004
- Protogygia biclavis (Grote, 1879)
- Protogygia comstocki McDunnough, 1934
- Protogygia elevata (J.B. Smith, 1891)
- Protogygia enalaga McDunnough, 1932
- Protogygia lagena (Grote, 1875)
- Protogygia milleri (Grote, 1876)
- Protogygia pallida Fauske & Lafontaine, 2004
- Protogygia pectinata Lafontaine, 2004
- Protogygia polingi (Barnes & Benjamin, 1922)
- Protogygia postera Fauske & Lafontaine, 2004
- Protogygia querula (Dod, 1915) (syn: Protogygia epipsilioides (Barnes & Benjamin, 1926))
- Protogygia rufescens Fauske & Lafontaine, 2004
- Protogygia whitesandsensis Metzler & Forbes, 2009
