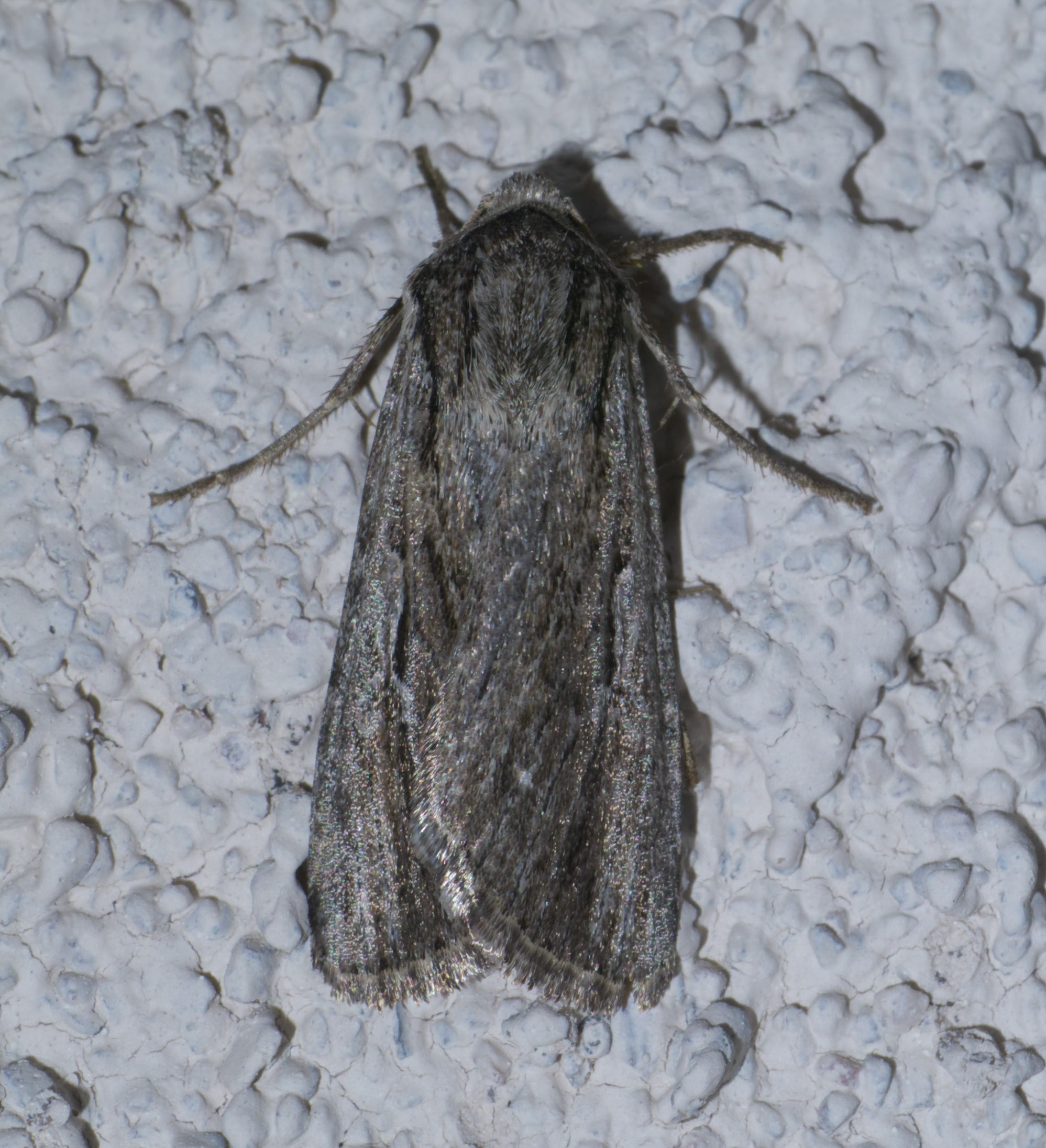

Scientific classification
- Kingdom: Animalia
- Phylum: Arthropoda
- Class: Insecta
- Order: Lepidoptera
- Superfamily: Noctuoidea
- Family: Noctuidae
- Genus: Protogygia
- Species: P. lagena

Binomial name
- Protogygia lagena (Grote, 1875)

= Protogygia lagena =

Species of moth

Protogygia lagena, the lagena dart, is a species of cutworm or dart moth in the family Noctuidae. It is found in North America.
