= Tularosa Basin =

Graben basin in the Southwestern United States

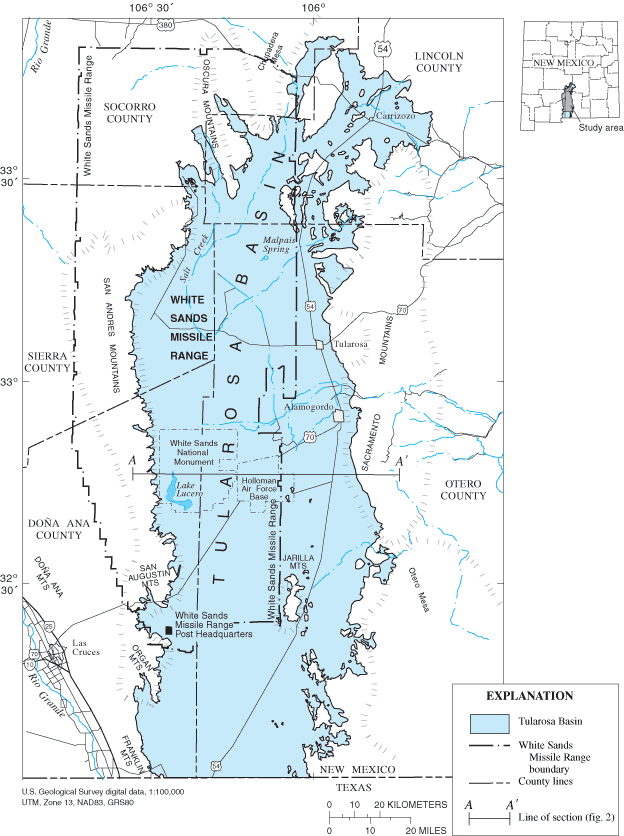
Map of the Tularosa Basin (light blue) and its landmarks, in southern New Mexico and West Texas, U.S.

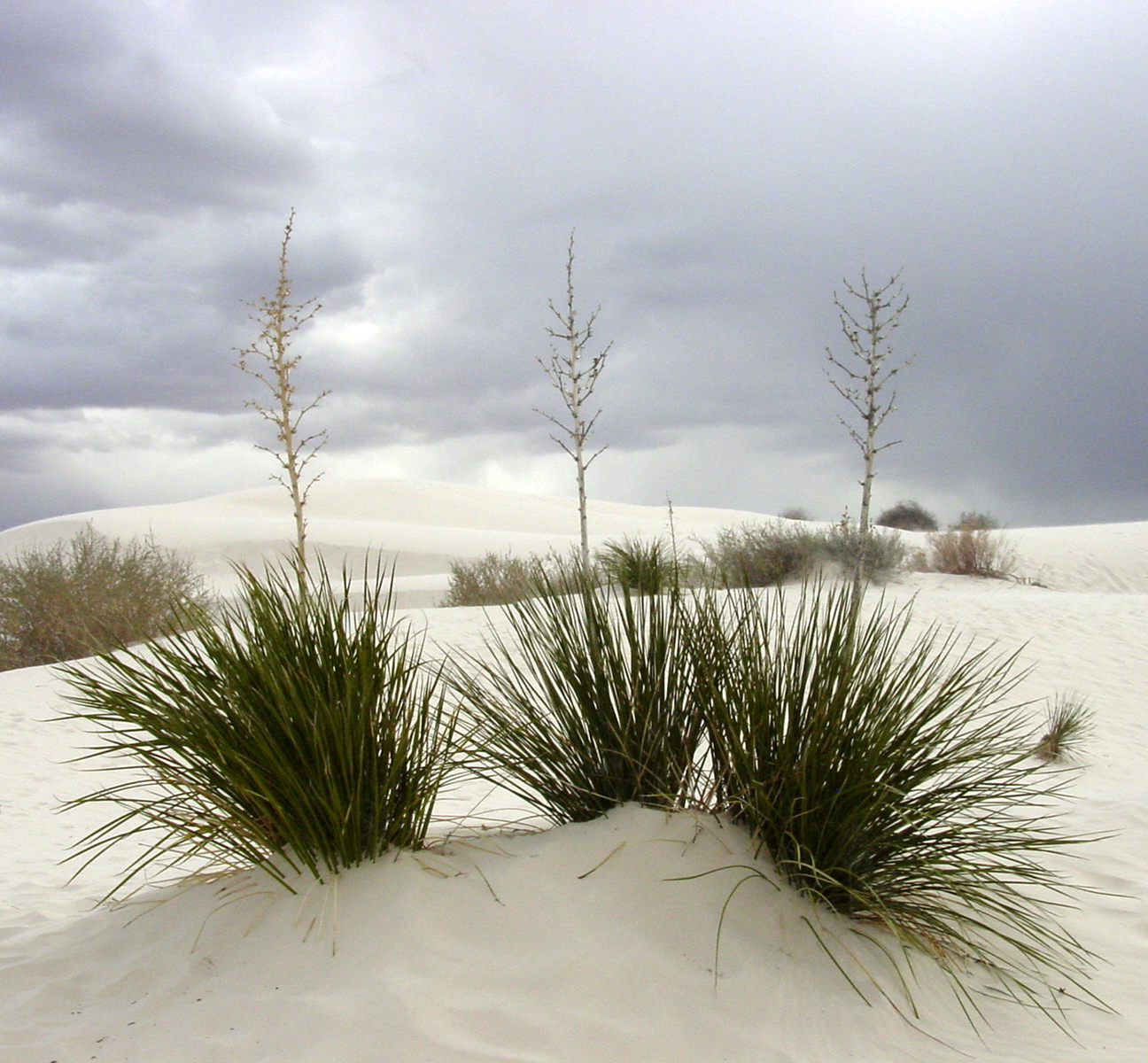
White gypsum sand and Yucca (Yucca elata) plants, in Tularosa Basin at White Sands National Park.

The Tularosa Basin is a graben basin in the Basin and Range Province and within the Chihuahuan Desert, east of the Rio Grande in southern New Mexico and West Texas, in the Southwestern United States.

== Geography ==
The Tularosa Basin is located primarily in Otero County, New Mexico. It covers about 6,500 sq mi (16,800 km^{2}) (35% larger than Connecticut). It lies between the Sacramento Mountains to the east, the Sierra Blanca to the northeast, and the San Andres and Oscura Mountains to the west. The basin stretches about 150 mi (240 km) north–south, and at its widest is about 60 mi (100 km) east-west. It is geologically considered part of the Rio Grande Rift zone, which widens there due to the slight clockwise rotation of the Colorado Plateau tectonic plate.

Notable features of the basin include White Sands National Park, Oliver Lee Memorial State Park, the Carrizozo Malpais lava flow, Holloman Air Force Base, and the White Sands Missile Range with the historic Trinity nuclear test Site. Tularosa Creek flows westward into the Tularosa Basin just north of the village of Tularosa. (The distinct northwestern New Mexico Tularosa River is not located in the basin, but rather in Catron County.)

Hydrologically, the Tularosa Basin is an endorheic basin, as no water flows out of it. The basin is closed to the north by Chupadera Mesa and to the south by the broad flat 4000-foot-elevation plain between the Franklin and Hueco Mountains, with the conventional boundary taken to be the New Mexico–Texas border. Surface water that does not evaporate or soak into the ground eventually accumulates at playas (intermittently dry lake beds), the largest of which is Lake Lucero, at 3888 feet elevation, at the southwest end of the White Sands dunes. The White Sands are a 710-km^{2} (275-mi^{2}) field of white sand dunes composed of gypsum crystals. To the north of Lake Lucero are extensive alkali flats, which produce additional gypsum for wind deposition on the dunes. The town of Carrizozo at the northern edge of the basin has an elevation of 5,545 ft (1,690 m). Near Carrizozo is the Carrizozo volcanic field, an elongated 5,000 year old lava flow with a length of 42 miles (68 km).

== History ==
Upper Paleolithic

The White Sands fossil footprints in the Tularosa Basin are estimated by the National Park Service to be 21,000 to 23,000 years old and include footprints possibly showing humans stalking a giant sloth. The footprints are located at the shore of an ice age-era lake. As of November 2021, 61 fossil footprints have been found at the site.

Apache, Spanish, and U.S. 'Old West'

When the Spanish arrived in the Tularosa Basin, they found springs and small streams coming from the Sacramento Mountains that fed a relatively lush grassland on the eastern side of the basin. While the Spanish tried some sheep ranching and some mining, the area remained firmly under Apache control until the 1850s, when the United States established its military presence at Fort Stanton (in the Sacramento Mountains) (1855–1896), Torreon Fort (near Lincoln) (1850s), and Camp Comfort (1858–1859) at White Sands. Under US military protection, the first permanent settlement was established in 1862, when about 50 Hispanic farmers from the Rio Grande Valley moved to Tularosa. Efforts to control the Apache waned somewhat during the American Civil War and serious American settlement did not begin until the late 1870s, when settlers and cattle ranchers from Texas began moving into the basin. In 1969, the gemsbok was introduced.

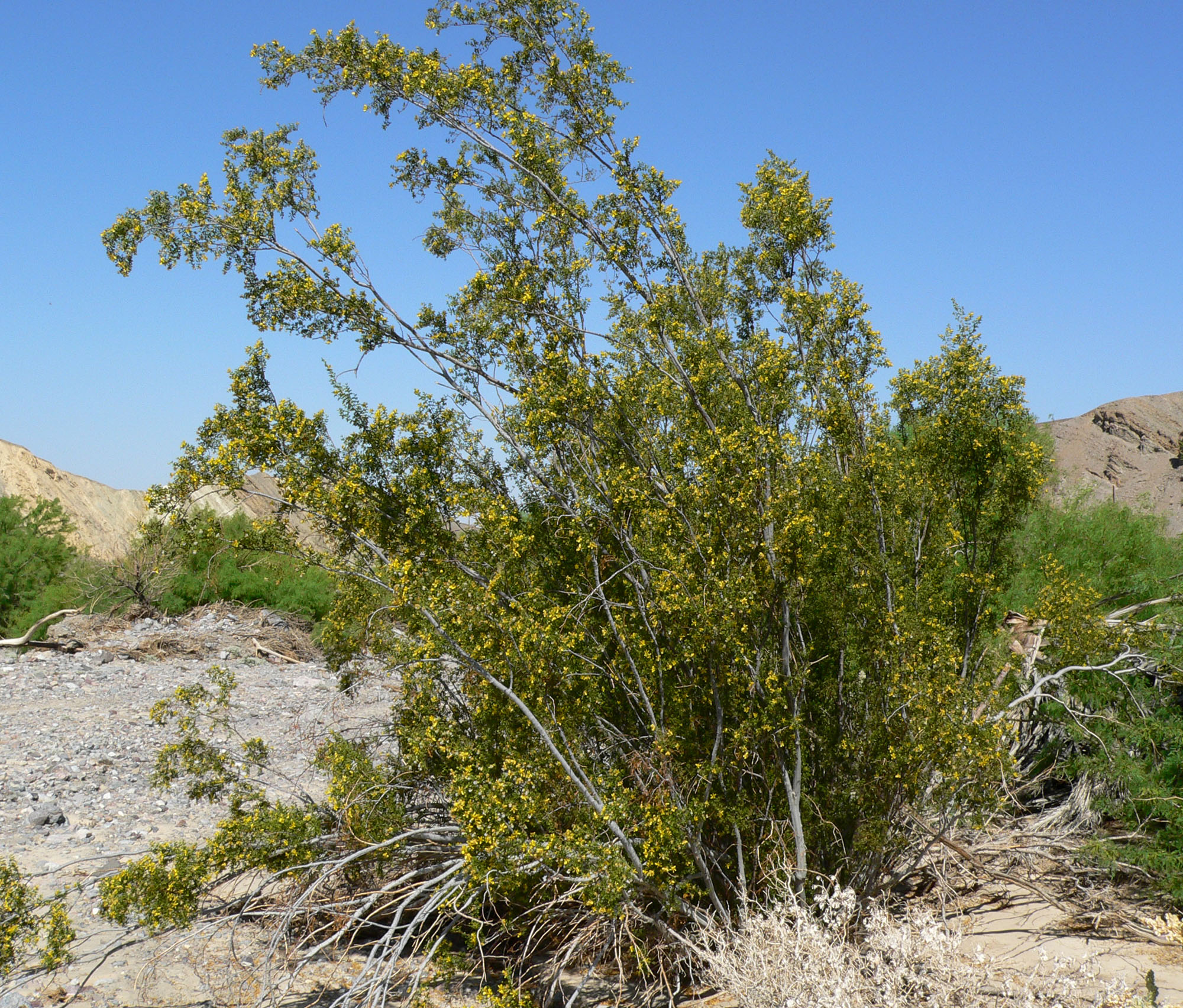
Creosote bush (Larrea tridentata), that replaced the overgrazed perennial grasslands.

Grasslands and grazing

The native grasslands in the Tularosa Basin were able to support large herds in the wet years of the 1880s. When the Americans first started running cattle, in some places the native perennial bunchgrasses grew 'as high as a horse's shoulder' - 1.0–2.5 m (3.3–8.2 ft) depending on species. One cowboy estimated in 1889 that 85,000 head were mustered within the basin, but said that was "far too heavy a burden for the range"—beyond its carrying capacity. Severe drought followed for years, and the grassland pastures never recovered from the overgrazing, which continued in many instances for 75 years or more and caused top-soil erosion and desertification. Even within the White Sands Missile Range, where cattle grazing was eliminated in 1945, the effects from the 1890–1945 period of overgrazing can still be seen nearly everywhere. Many areas that were historically known to be rich perennial grasslands are now xeric desert shrublands, with creosote bush (Larrea tridentata) predominating.

Groundwater salinization

Since surface water was unable to sustain the cattle herds, ranchers turned to groundwater, and the easily reachable aquifer of 'sweet water' was pumped out and depleted from under the basin, leaving only brackish water. Applying the groundwater to the surface resulted in additional salts being dissolved and transported back down by groundwater recharge into the aquifer, increasing its salinity. By 2000, it became clear that salts in the aquifer needed to be significantly reduced if existing levels of water use were to continue. Therefore, in 2004, the Tularosa Basin National Desalination Research Facility was established in the basin at Alamogordo, as a joint project of the Federal Bureau of Reclamation and Sandia National Laboratories. It is a national center for researching procedures to reduce brackish water creation and to develop new technologies for desalination as it is increasingly found in present-day inland basin aquifers with agricultural irrigation and potable water withdrawal demands.

== Ecology ==
The Tularosa Basin is in the Chihuahuan Desert ecoregion, with the former Great Plains grassland habitat ecotones. Because of the closed nature of the basin, a number of unique ecological niches have developed. A significant number of endemic species are only found in the Tularosa Basin. These include the White Sands pupfish (Cyprinodon tularosa) and the Oscura Mountains chipmunk.

== Counties ==
While the Tularosa Basin lies primarily in New Mexican Otero County, it also extends into Doña Ana, Sierra, Lincoln, and Socorro Counties in New Mexico, and El Paso County in southwest Texas.

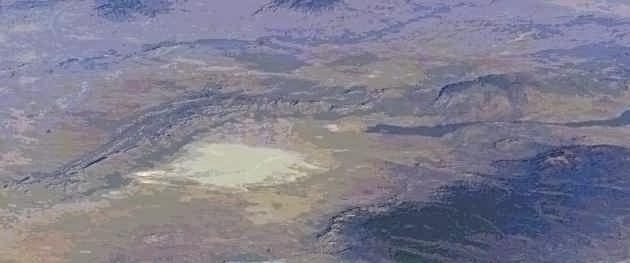
View from the ISS during Expedition 8 Earth observation of the desert Jornada del Muerto region of the Tularosa Basin (showing the dry Lake Lucero)

=== Cities, towns, and ghost towns ===
- Alamogordo 32.90°N 105.96°W
- Alvarado 32.08°N 106.14°W
- Boles Acres 32.81°N 105.99°W
- Carrizozo 33.64°N 105.88°W
- Coane
- Desert 32.12°N 106.11°W
- Elwood 32.18°N 106.08°W
- Estey City
- Holloman AFB 32.82°N 105.94°W ZIP Code: 88330
- Kearney 32.98°N 105.99°W
- La Luz 32.98°N 105.94°W ZIP Code: 88337
- Lovelace 33.46°N 106.02°W
- Monista 32.83°N 106.07°W
- Omlee 32.84°N 105.97°W
- Orogrande 32.37°N 106.08°W ZIP Code: 88342
- Oscura
- Point of Sands
- Polly
- Salinas
- Three Rivers 33.32°N 106.07°W ZIP Code: 88352
- Tularosa 33.07°N 106.02°W ZIP Code: 88352
- Turquoise 32.45°N 106.03°W
- Valmont 32.75°N 105.99°W
- White Sands 32.38°N 106.48°W
