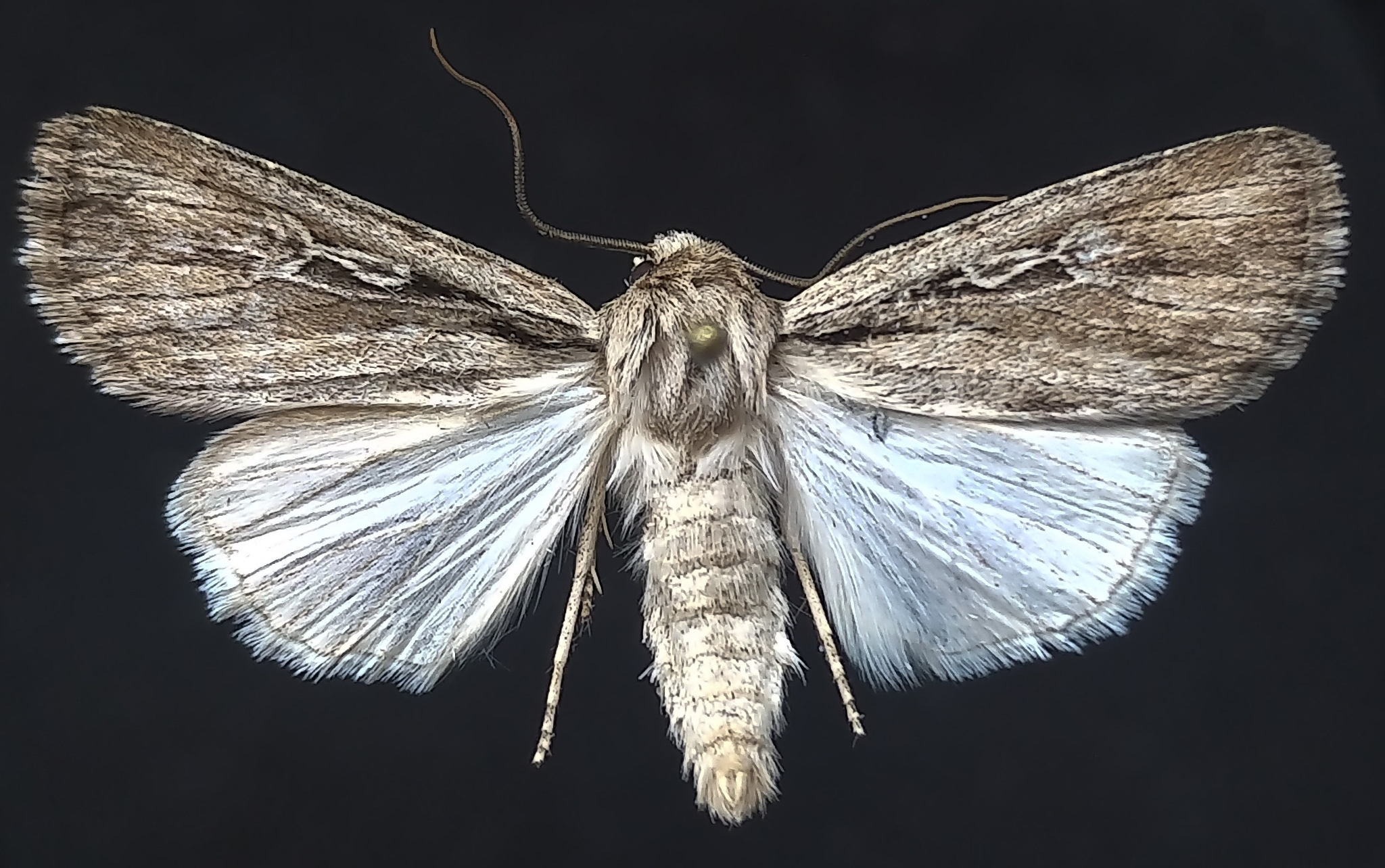

Scientific classification
- Domain: Eukaryota
- Kingdom: Animalia
- Phylum: Arthropoda
- Class: Insecta
- Order: Lepidoptera
- Superfamily: Noctuoidea
- Family: Noctuidae
- Tribe: Noctuini
- Subtribe: Agrotina
- Genus: Protogygia
- Species: P. postera

Binomial name
- Protogygia postera Fauske & Lafontaine, 2004

= Protogygia postera =

Species of moth

Protogygia postera is a species of cutworm or dart moth in the family Noctuidae. It is found in North America.
