= Protogygia polingi =

Scientific classification
- Domain: Eukaryota
- Kingdom: Animalia
- Phylum: Arthropoda
- Class: Insecta
- Order: Lepidoptera
- Superfamily: Noctuoidea
- Family: Noctuidae
- Genus: Protogygia
- Species: P. polingi

Binomial name
- Protogygia polingi (Barnes & Benjamin, 1922)

Species of moth

Protogygia polingi is a species of cutworm or dart moth in the family Noctuidae. It was first described by William Barnes and Foster Hendrickson Benjamin in 1922 and it is found in North America.

The MONA or Hodges number for Protogygia polingi is 10896.
