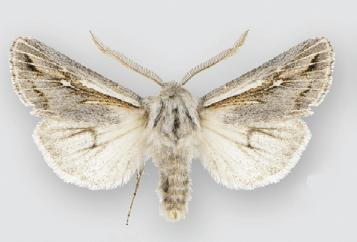
- Protogygia whitesandsensis (male)

Scientific classification
- Kingdom: Animalia
- Phylum: Arthropoda
- Clade: Pancrustacea
- Class: Insecta
- Order: Lepidoptera
- Superfamily: Noctuoidea
- Family: Noctuidae
- Genus: Protogygia
- Species: P. whitesandsensis

Binomial name
- Protogygia whitesandsensis Metzler & Forbes, 2009

Synonyms
- Protogygia whitesandensis

= Protogygia whitesandsensis =

Species of moth

Protogygia whitesandsensis or Protogygia whitesandensis is a moth of the family Noctuidae. It is found in the White Sands National Park, Otero County, New Mexico.

The length of the forewings is 14–17 mm.
