= Lake Lucero =

Lake in New Mexico, United States

Coordinates: 32°42′22″N 106°26′17″W

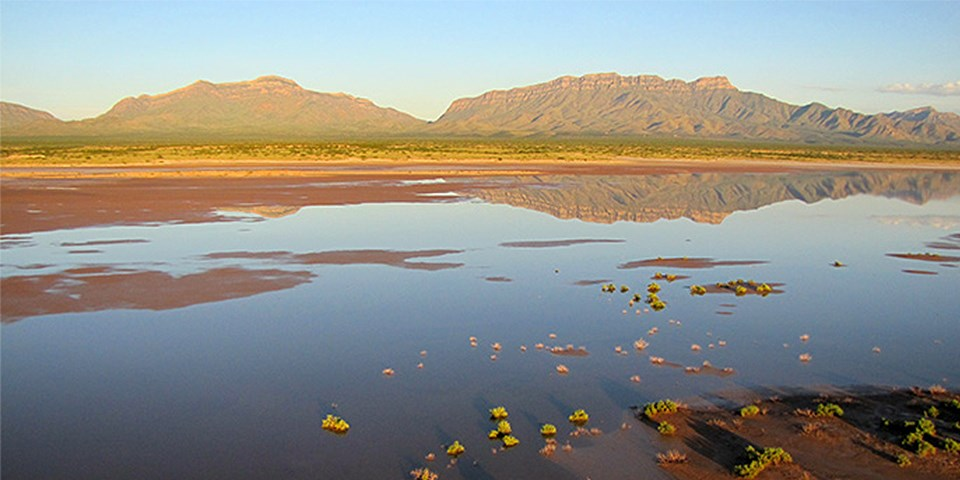
Lake Lucero with the San Andres Mountains to the west. National Park Service photo.

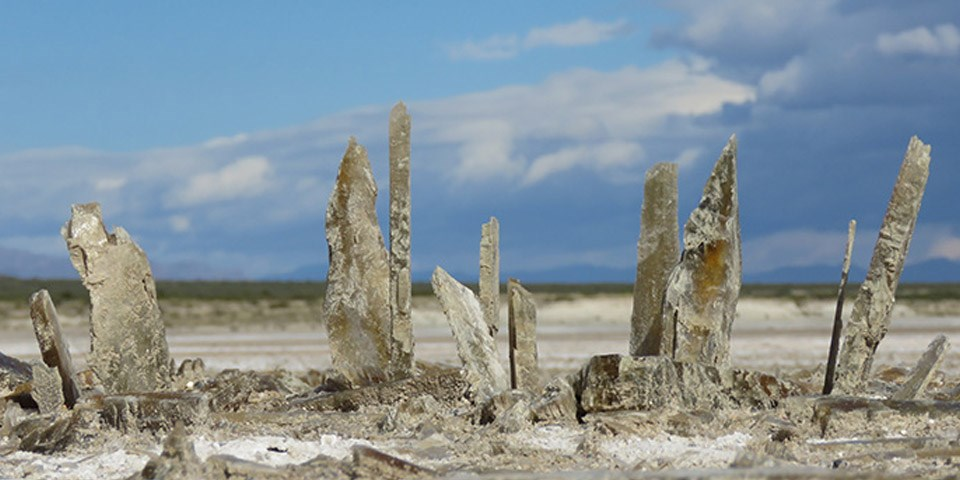
Selenite crystals that formed as the lake water evaporated

Lake Lucero is a playa located within that section of the Tularosa Basin that is contained within White Sands National Park in the U.S. state of New Mexico. The playa is noted for the unusually high quantity of water-deposited and wind-deposited gypsum dissolved in its intermittent waters. Annual evaporation cycles have caused much of the gypsum to precipitate into crystals of impure, brownish selenite that line the alkaline mudflats of the lakeshore. The further process of gypsum erosion abrades the fragile selenite, and other precipitated gypsum, into the pure-white sands covering most of the national park.

Lake Lucero is located in a section of the National Park, the Zone of Cooperative Use, to which access is typically restricted for reasons of U.S. military security. Periodic guided tours, supervised by the National Park Service, give interested parties an opportunity to pay brief visits to the lake and adjacent arid desert.

The nearest communities offering tourism facilities are Las Cruces and Alamogordo. U.S. route 70 passes approximately five miles southeast of the lake between Las Cruces and Alamogordo, although the playa is not visible from the road.

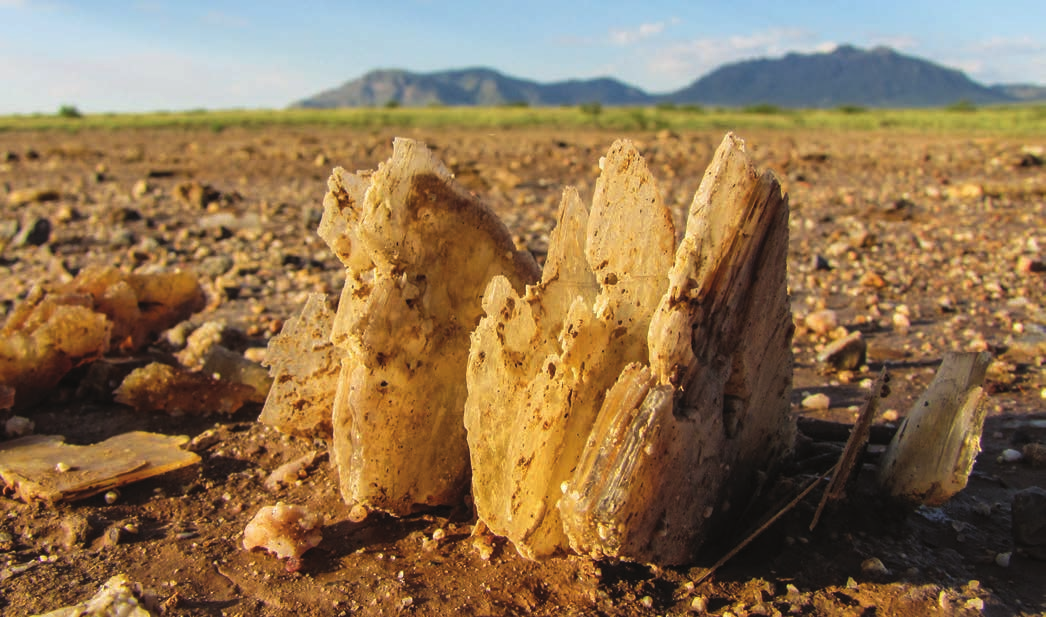
Selenite crystals

== History ==
Lake Lucero is named after two brothers, José Lucero and Felipe Lucero, who in 1897 acquired a quarter-section of water-bearing land along the south shore of the largely dry lake. The brothers, who also served as sheriffs of Doña Ana County, parlayed their homestead into a 20,000-acre (8,100 ha) ranch; the arid land could support 2,000 cattle. Eventual condemnation of the ranch helped create part of the White Sands Missile Range (1945), now also used as the Zone of Cooperative Use section of White Sands National Park.
