= White Sands National Park =

National park in New Mexico, United States

- IUCN category II (national park)
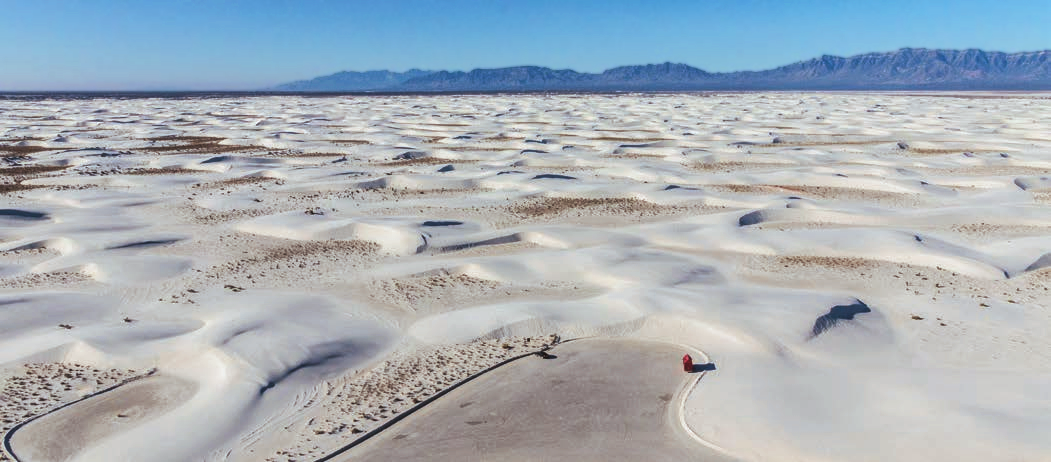
- Aerial view of dunefield
- Interactive map of White Sands National Park
- Location: Otero County and Doña Ana County, New Mexico, United States
- Nearest city: Alamogordo, New Mexico
- Coordinates: 32°46′45″N 106°10′19″W
- Area: 145,762 acres (227.753 sq mi; 589.88 km^{2})^{+}
- Established: January 18, 1933 (as a national monument); December 20, 2019 (as a national park)
- Visitors: 729,096 (in 2023)
- Governing body: National Park Service
- Website: Official website

- White Sands National Monument Historic District
- U.S. National Register of Historic Places
- U.S. Historic district
- Former U.S. National Monument
- NM State Register of Cultural Properties
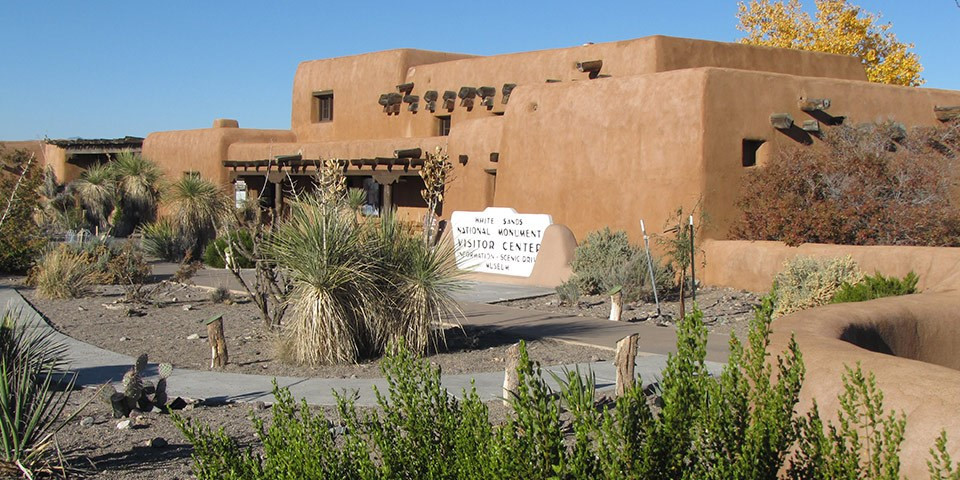
- Visitor center
- Built: 1936–38 (original NRHP buildings)
- Architect: Lyle E. Bennett, et al.
- Architectural style: Pueblo Revival
- NRHP reference No.: 88000751
- NMSRCP No.: 1491

Significant dates
- Added to NRHP: June 23, 1988
- Designated NMSRCP: September 9, 1988

White Sands National Park is a national park of the United States located in New Mexico and completely surrounded by White Sands Missile Range. The park covers 145,762 acres (227.8 sq mi; 589.9 km^{2}) in the Tularosa Basin, including the southern 41% of a 275 mi^{2} (710 km^{2}) field of white sand dunes composed of gypsum crystals. This gypsum dunefield is the largest of its kind on Earth, with a depth of about 30 feet (9.1 m), dunes as tall as 60 feet (18 m), and about 4.5 billion short tons (4.1 billion metric tons) of gypsum sand.

Approximately 12,000 years ago, the land within the Tularosa Basin featured large lakes, streams, grasslands, and Ice Age mammals. As the climate warmed, rain and snowmelt dissolved gypsum from the surrounding mountains and carried it into the basin. Further warming and drying caused the lakes to evaporate and form selenite crystals. Strong winds then broke up crystals and transported them eastward. A similar process continues to produce gypsum sand today.

Thousands of species of animals inhabit the park, a large portion of which are invertebrates. Several animal species feature a white or off-white coloration. At least 45 species are endemic, living only in this park, with 40 of them being moth species. The Tularosa Basin has also seen a number of human inhabitants, from Paleo-Indians tens of millennia ago to modern farmers, ranchers, and miners.

White Sands National Park was originally designated White Sands National Monument on January 18, 1933, by President Herbert Hoover. Since 1941, the park has been surrounded by the military installations of White Sands Missile Range and Holloman Air Force Base. It was redesignated as a national park by Congress and signed into law by President Donald Trump on December 20, 2019. It is the most visited National Park Service site in New Mexico, with about 600,000 visitors each year. The park features a drive from the visitor center to the heart of the dunes, picnic areas, backcountry campground in the dunefield, marked hiking trails, and sledding on the dunes. Ranger-guided orientation and nature walks occur at various times and months throughout the year.

== History ==
=== Native people ===
The potentially oldest known human footprints in North America were found at White Sands by researchers who identified approximately 60 fossilized footprints buried in layers of gypsum soil on a large playa in the Tularosa Basin. Multiple human footprints are stratigraphically constrained and bracketed by layers containing seeds of Ruppia cirrhosa that yield calibrated radiocarbon ages between 21,000 and 23,000 years ago, according to the U.S. Geological Survey. The present consensus for human arrival into North America is placed at 13–16,000 years ago. Initially, these estimates were questioned by other authors, who suggested that the dating could potentially be erroneus, due to the fact that Ruppia cirrhosa intakes carbon from the water in which it grows rather than the air, which may introduce systematic error making the seeds seem older than they actually are. However, the date was later supported by a variety of methods, including radiocarbon dating of pollen and optically stimulated luminescence dating of quartz grains within the footprint layers. Other tracks are known for extinct megafauna, including ground sloths (likely either Nothrotheriops or Paramylodon) and Columbian mammoths, which appear to be contemporaneous to human footprints.

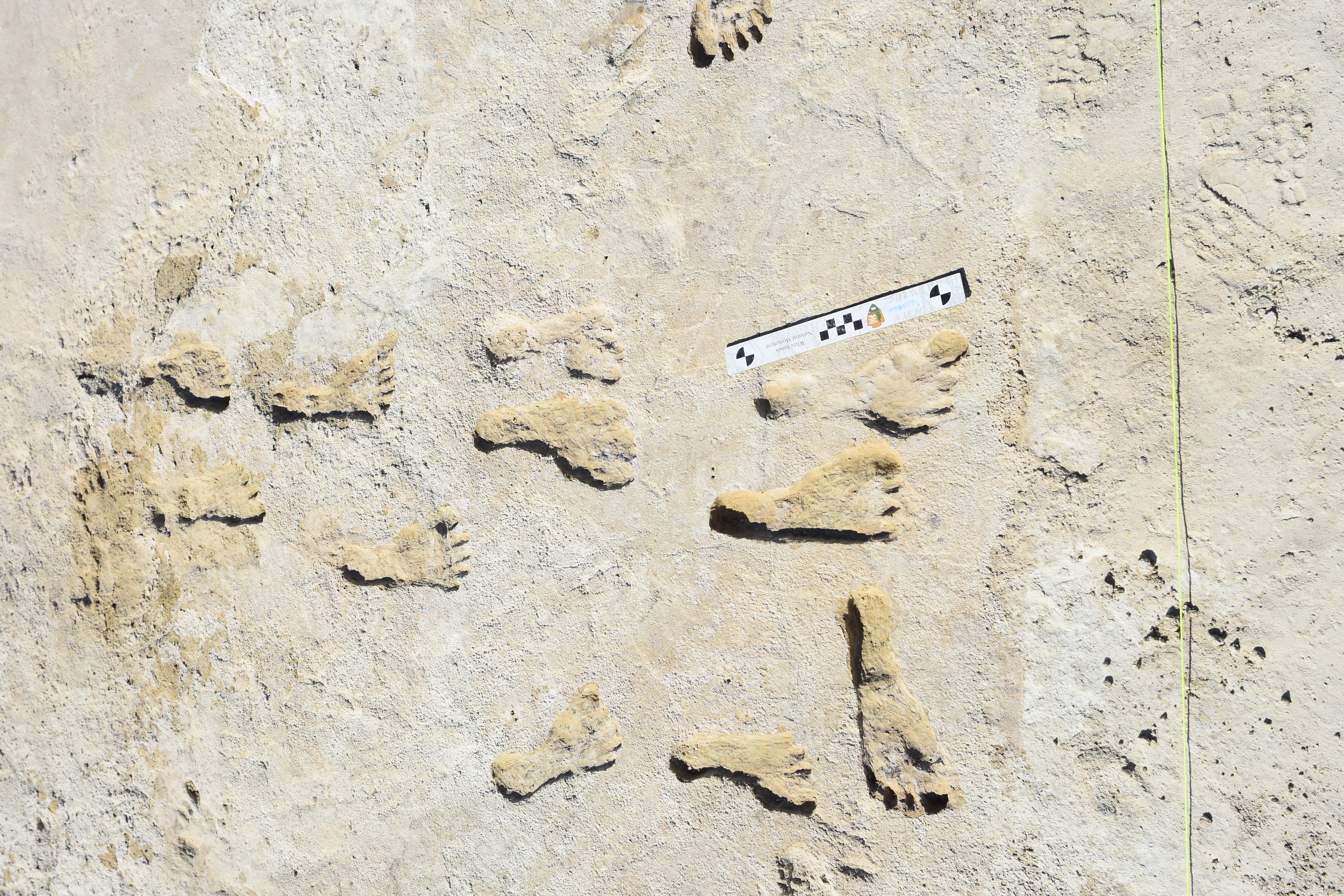
Some of the White Sands fossil footprints

Paleo-Indians inhabited the shoreline of Lake Otero, a large lake that covered much of the Tularosa Basin. They used stone from the mountains to create projectile points, known as Folsom and Plano points, and attached them to spears for hunting mammoths, camels, ground sloths, and bison. Projectile points and stone tools have been found in the basin associated with ancient shorelines, streams, and hills. As the large ice sheet that capped the North American continent receded, Lake Otero began to evaporate, leaving behind Alkali Flat and Lake Lucero. The grassland died, and the basin became increasingly arid, slowly changing into desert scrubland. The megafauna disappeared from the basin, leaving behind fossil footprints.

The Archaic people improved upon the hand-thrown spear used by Paleo-Indians with the invention of the atlatl. After Lake Otero dried out, wind carried large quantities of gypsum sand up from the basin floor, which accumulated into a large dunefield. Archaic people entered the Tularosa Basin about 4,000 years ago, after the dunes had stabilized, possibly attracted by a cereal grass called Indian ricegrass. The first evidence of agriculture is found in the Archaic period. Archaic peoples would tend to wild plants so they would produce in a more reliable manner and in larger quantities than they did naturally. Archaic people started living in small villages throughout the year to tend their fields. Hearth mounds are found within the dunes, which are the remains of prehistoric fires containing charcoal and ash. When gypsum is heated to 300 °F (149 °C) it becomes a plaster that hardens when moisture is added and subsequently evaporates. The plaster cements these hearths in place, preserving them for thousands of years.

The Jornada Mogollon people made pottery, lived in permanent houses, and farmed the Tularosa Basin. Evidence of their prehistoric presence dates back to about 200 CE. The Jornada Mogollon inhabited the basin until about 1350 CE when they moved away, leaving behind puddled adobe structures and pottery sherds.

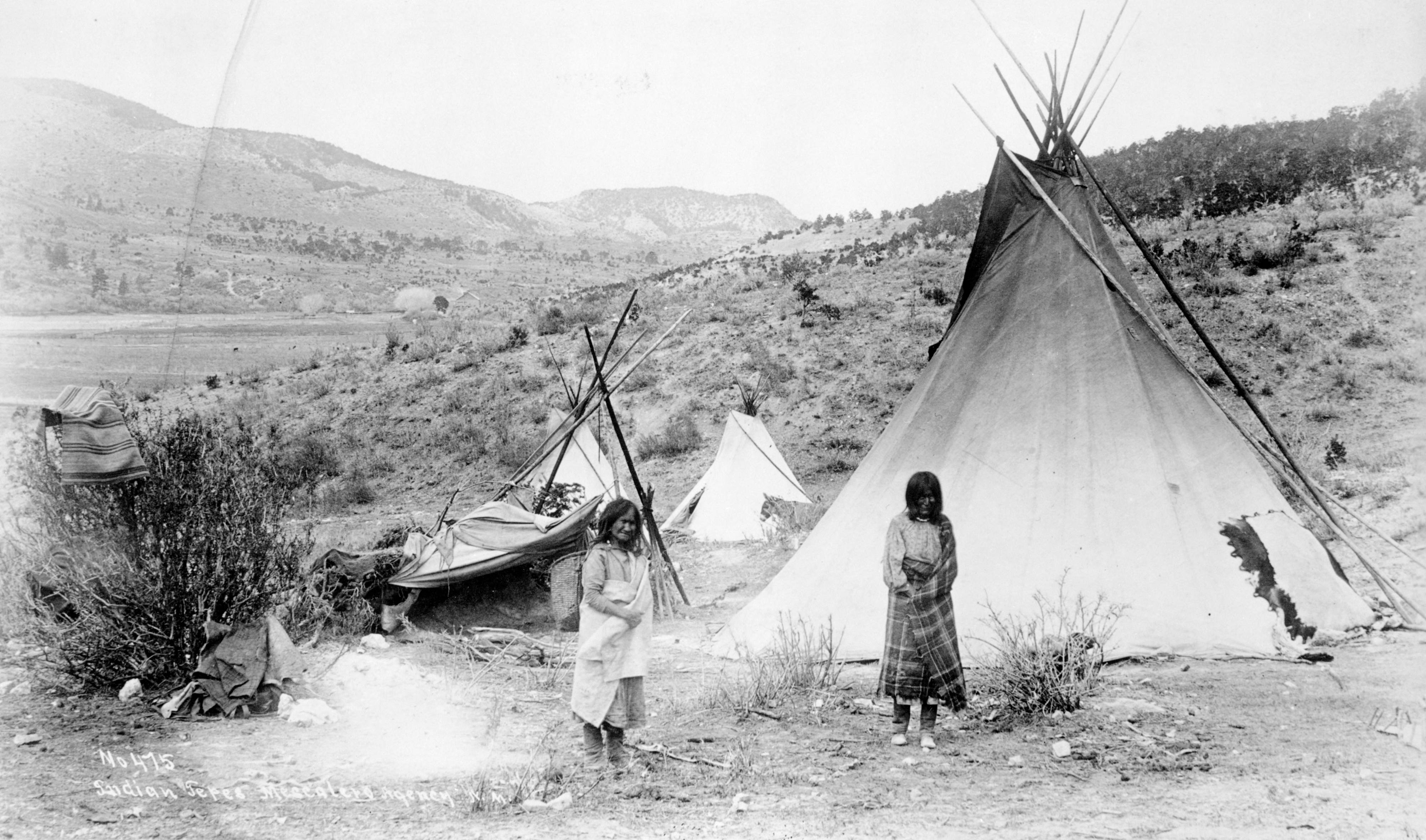
Two Mescalero Apache women and teepees, c. 1890–1910

Over 700 years ago, bands of Apaches followed herds of bison from the Great Plains to the Tularosa Basin. The Apaches were nomadic hunters and gatherers who lived in temporary houses known as wickiups and teepees. The Apaches had established a sizable territory in southern New Mexico by the time European explorers arrived. They fiercely defended the rights to their homeland against the encroachment of colonial settlers. Apache groups, led by Victorio and Geronimo, fought with settlers in the basin and engaged in military battles with Buffalo Soldiers. The Battle of Hembrillo Basin in 1880 was a military engagement between Victorio's warriors and the United States Army's 9th Cavalry Regiment of Buffalo Soldiers. The battleground, located on White Sands Missile Range, is the closest archaeological evidence of the Apache Wars (1849 to 1924). Conflict between the Apaches and the American settlers over their conflicting interests in the basin ultimately ended in the forceful removal of the Apaches from their homelands to the Mescalero Apache Indian Reservation. The Mescalero Apache maintain an active cultural affinity to the landscape of their ancestors.

=== Euro-Americans ===
While a Spanish colony was established to the north around Santa Fe, the Tularosa Basin was generally avoided until the nineteenth century. The basin lacked any reliable water sources and was the primary stronghold of local Apaches who stole livestock from Pueblo and Spanish settlements near the basin. When Spaniards did enter the basin, they traveled along established trails to the salt pan north of Alkali Flat. Spanish colonists had established the salt trails in 1647, to connect the salt deposits with the Camino Real in El Paso del Norte (present-day Ciudad Juárez) and silver mines in Durango, Mexico. Salt is a fundamental element in the processing of silver ore. Expeditionary parties using mule-drawn carts with military escorts would be formed a few times each year for the journey to the salinas (salt pans).

Hispanic populations throughout the Spanish colonial and Mexican periods were allowed to gather salt from the salinas, which were considered public property. Texan-American settlers made private claims to the land to profit from the mining of minerals on their property. James Magoffin held a title to the salt flats north of Lake Lucero but had been unsuccessful in collecting fees for salt gathering. In 1854, using military force, he intercepted a salt gathering expedition of Hispanos from Doña Ana at the salt flats and fatally wounded three members of the party. In response to Magoffin's use of extreme force during the Magoffin Salt War, the courts dissolved his property claim to the salt flats and established a precedent for free public access to salt deposits. The first U.S. Army exploration of south-central New Mexico was led by a party of topographical engineering officers in 1849. They passed west of the San Andres Mountains and Organ Mountains. A lieutenant was dispatched east across the basin with a scouting party to map a potential military wagon route to the Sierra Blanca.

Hispanic families started to farm communities at Tularosa in 1861 and La Luz in 1863. The villagers mixed water with gypsum sand from the dunefield to create plaster for the adobe walls of their homes. The white color was not only decorative but functional in deflecting the rays of the summer sun.

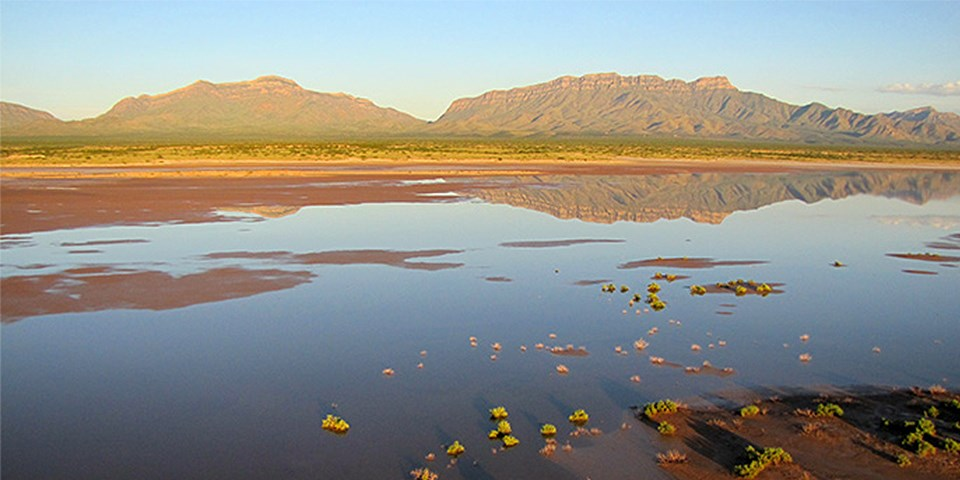
Lake Lucero, an ephemeral lake filled by a significant rainfall

In the 1880s, a brief period of heavy rainfall supported the return of lush grasslands in the Tularosa Basin, which attracted the attention of goat, sheep, and cattle grazers, predominantly from Texas. Large cattle drives pushed into the basin, and ranching became the dominant economy for the next sixty years. In 1897, the Lucero brothers, Jose, Felipe, and Estevan, began ranching on the south shore of the lake that would eventually bear their name. By 1940, Felipe consolidated the family's ranches into a 20,000-acre (31 sq mi; 81 km^{2}) property. Shortly afterward, the National Park Service took over ownership of the Lucero family properties with their appropriation of Lake Lucero and Alkali Flat. The remnants of the Lucero family ranch include the stock pens, watering trough, a water well, and a fallen windmill, which visitors can see on a ranger-led tour to Lake Lucero once each month, in the cooler months of the year.

At the turn of the twentieth century, the discovery of oil, coal, silver, gold, and other precious mineral deposits inspired many settlers to cover the Tularosa Basin in mining claims. By 1904, over 114 people made mineral claims to more than 10,400 acres (16.3 sq mi; 42 km^{2}) of Lake Lucero; however, very few of the claims were developed. Eddy's Soda Prospect, developed by the same Eddy brothers who had founded the El Paso and Northeastern Railway and the town of Alamogordo, was a mineral recovery operation for glauberite salt mining along the southern shore of Lake Lucero. In 1907, J.R. Milner and Bill Fetz constructed a plaster of Paris batching plant along the southern edge of the dunes. The operation involved drilling long shafts into the dunes and extracting gypsum to cook into plaster at night. Though successful, the establishment of the national monument permanently shut down the plant.

=== National monument ===
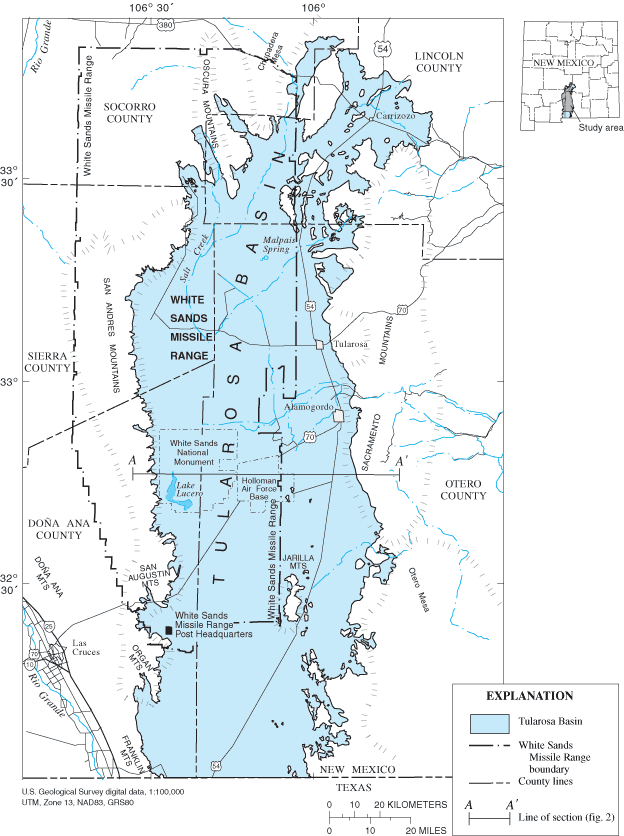
Map of the Tularosa Basin with the park near the center, on the west side

The idea of creating a national park to protect the white sands formation dates to 1898, when a group from El Paso, Texas proposed the creation of Mescalero National Park. The plan failed as it included a game hunting preserve that conflicted with the idea of preservation held by the Department of the Interior.

From 1912 to 1922, Albert B. Fall, a senator from New Mexico who was later appointed Secretary of the Interior and the owner of a large ranch in Three Rivers northeast of the dune field, promoted four separate bills in Congress for a national park in the Tularosa Basin. Fall's ultimate plan was called the All-Year National Park, as it would be open throughout the year, unlike more northerly parks. The bill included four geographically separate and diverse areas to be administered as one national park. The proposed areas included a 2,000-acre (3.1 sq mi; 8.1 km^{2}) scenic portion of the Mescalero Indian reservation, 640 acres (1.0 sq mi; 2.6 km^{2}) of the dune field, 640 acres of a volcanic area to the north named Carrizozo Malpais, and the shoreline of the Elephant Butte Reservoir to the west, beyond the San Andres Mountains. Stephen Mather, the director of the National Park Service, criticized the proposal as having "disjointed boundaries, lack of spectacular scenery, and questionable usage". The National Parks Association and the Indian Rights Association campaigned against Fall's bill, mainly because of the appropriation of Indian reservation land and the possibility of establishing a precedent of industrial usage within parks. The bill failed in Congress, and Fall resigned in 1923 during the Teapot Dome scandal.

During the 1920s, an Alamogordo businessman named Tom Charles promoted the potential economic benefits of protecting the white sands formation. Charles mobilized enough local support for the construction of an improved state route between Las Cruces and Alamogordo (now U.S. Route 70), passing the southern edge of the dune field. He lobbied to have the dunes declared a national park, but was advised by Senator Bronson M. Cutting, who influenced President Herbert Hoover, that national monument status would be much easier to obtain.

On January 18, 1933, President Hoover designated White Sands National Monument, acting under the authority of the Antiquities Act of 1906. The dedication and grand opening was on April 29, 1934. Tom Charles became the first custodian of the monument, and the first concessionaire in 1939, operating as White Sands Service Company. The visitor center and a nearby comfort station, three ranger residences, as well as three maintenance buildings were constructed of adobe bricks as a Works Progress Administration project starting in 1936 and completed in 1938. The original eight adobe buildings and other nearby structures were designated the White Sands National Monument Historic District when they were added to the National Register of Historic Places in 1988. The principal architects were Lyle E. Bennett and Robert W. Albers, who also designed NPS buildings together at Casa Grande and Bandelier national monuments. Bennett also designed the picnic table shelters at White Sands, the Painted Desert Inn at Petrified Forest, and buildings at Carlsbad Caverns and Mesa Verde national parks.

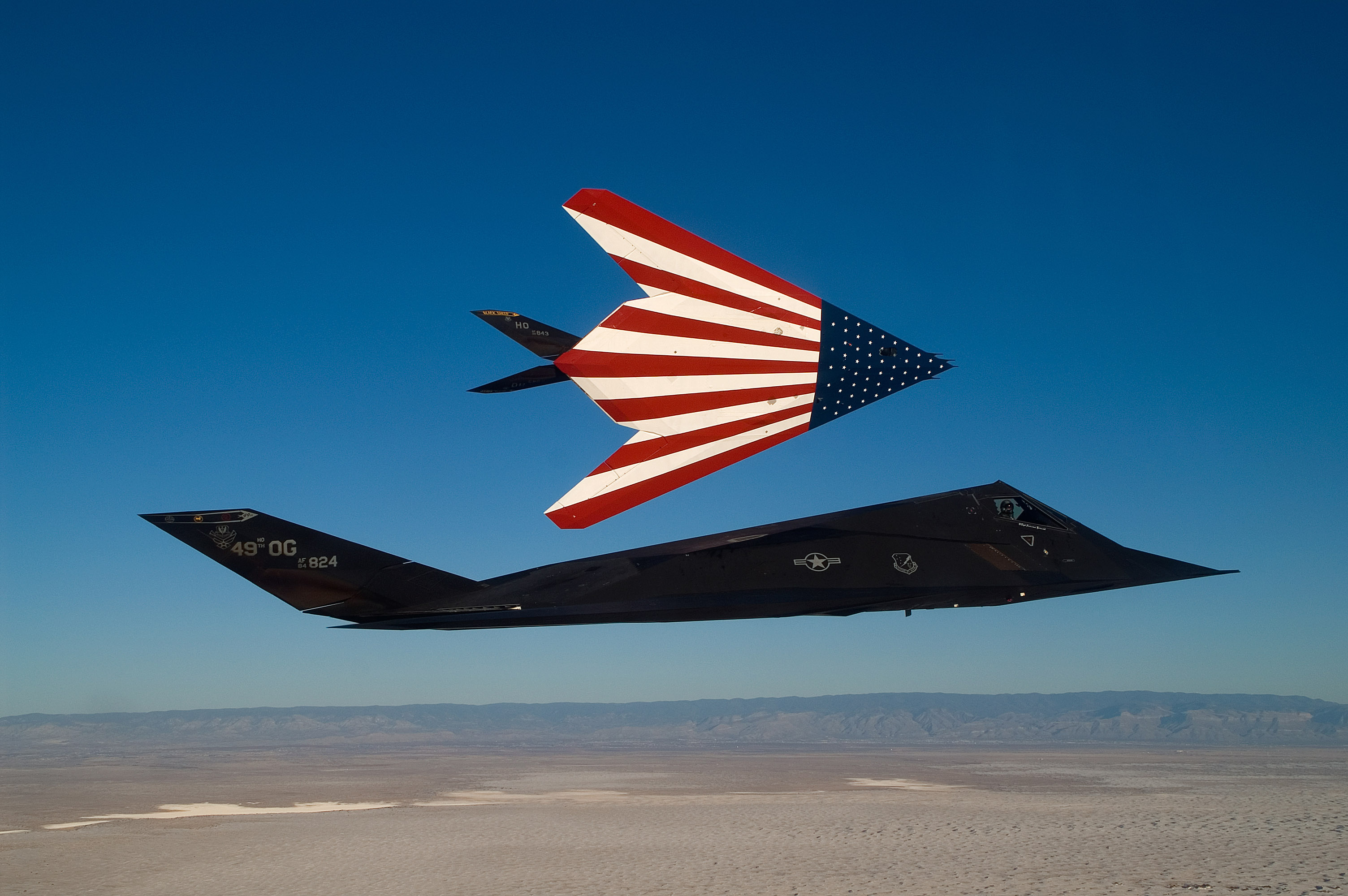
F-117s flying over White Sands to a retirement ceremony in Ohio. Holloman Air Force Base was its home base from 1992 to 2008.

The park is surrounded by the military installations of White Sands Missile Range and Holloman Air Force Base, and has always had an uneasy relationship with the military. The missile range and air force base were established after the bombing of Pearl Harbor in 1941, with continuing operations after World War II and throughout the Cold War. Errant missiles often fell within the park's boundaries, occasionally destroying some of the visitor areas. Overflights from Holloman disturbed the tranquility of the area. Flight training missions continue over the dunefield, and the park closes temporarily for several hours during missile tests in the adjacent range and cooperative use area on the west side of the park.

Between 1969 and 1977, 95 oryx were released on the missile range and adjacent areas of the Tularosa Basin by the New Mexico Department of Game and Fish for hunting purposes. The oryx, having no natural predators, entered the park and competed with native species for forage. Thousands of oryx reside on the missile range presently, though annual hunts have occurred since 1974 to help control and stabilize the population. The National Park Service, concerned about the negative effects on native plants and animals within the park, erected a 67-mile (108 km) long boundary fence in 1996 to prevent oryx from entering.

Increasingly problematic alcohol abuse by students during spring break in the 1990s led to a ban on the consumption of alcohol. The possession of alcohol or alcohol containers is banned throughout the park from February 1 to May 31.

=== World Heritage Site controversy ===
White Sands was placed on a tentative list of potential World Heritage Sites on January 22, 2008. The state's two U.S. Senators, Pete Domenici and Jeff Bingaman, wrote letters of support of the application. U.S. Representative Steve Pearce declined to support the application, saying, "I would guarantee that if White Sands Monument receives this designation, that there will at some point be international pressures exerted that could stop military operations as we know them today."

The WHS application generated much controversy in Otero County, most of it taking place in meetings of the Otero County Commission. A petition with 1,200 signatures opposing the application was presented to the commission on August 16, 2007. The commission passed a resolution of opposition to the application on August 23, 2007, and passed Ordinance 07-05 on October 18, 2007, relating to any potential World Heritage Site designations within the county. The ordinance requires coordination with the county in following its environmental planning and review process through its Public Land Use Advisory Council. It states that "No world heritage site...will be located on or adjacent to any military land...within or adjacent to the boundaries of Otero County." On January 24, 2008, after the WHS tentative list was announced, the commission instructed the county attorney to write a letter to the Secretary of the Interior, demanding that WSNM be taken off the list.

=== National park bill ===
In May 2018, U.S. Senator Martin Heinrich (D-New Mexico) introduced a bill to designate White Sands a national park. Heinrich consulted with monument officials, the National Park Service, White Sands Missile Range, the U.S. Army, and Holloman Air Force Base before the bill was introduced in Congress. The Alamogordo City Commission supported the bill; the Las Cruces City Council; the Mescalero Apache Tribal Council; the Town of Mesilla Board of Trustees; Alamogordo Mayor Richard Boss; New Mexico Senator Ron Griggs (Republican); the Alamogordo Chamber of Commerce; the Greater Las Cruces Chamber of Commerce; the Las Cruces Green Chamber of Commerce; the National Parks Conservation Association and the Southern New Mexico Public Lands Alliance. The bill was opposed, however, by Otero County commissioners, who stated that the main argument in favor of national park status was the potential for increased visitation, while also noting that the monument is already the most-visited NPS site in the state. The commissioners were also concerned that "the change in status will affect filmmaking here either from higher fees or increased regulation". The commissioners only supported boundary adjustments and additional infrastructure, such as campgrounds and improved road access. The Doña Ana County commissioners also opposed the redesignation of White Sands as a national park. The redesignation bill was re-introduced on March 27, 2019.

On December 11, 2019, the U.S. House of Representatives passed the National Defense Authorization Act for Fiscal Year 2020, which includes legislation redesignating White Sands National Monument as White Sands National Park. The Senate passed the act on December 16 and President Donald Trump signed the bill on December 20. The act includes the transfer of land management both to and from the missile range, as well as the protection of additional land, adding a net 2,029 acres (3.2 sq mi; 8.2 km^{2}) to the park.

=== Filming ===
While White Sands was a national monument, it was used as a filming location for scenes in several westerns including Four Faces West (1948), Hang 'Em High (1968), The Hired Hand (1971), My Name Is Nobody (1973), Bite the Bullet (1975), and Young Guns II (1990). Additional feature-length films with location shooting in the park include King Solomon's Mines (1950), The Man Who Fell to Earth (1976), White Sands (1992), Independence Day (1996), Transformers (2007), Transformers 2 (2009), The Men Who Stare at Goats (2009), Year One (2009), The Book of Eli (2010). Wye Oak's video with the title track for the album The Louder I Call, the Faster It Runs (2018) was filmed at White Sands. Yoga Mind & Body (1994), featuring yoga teacher Erich Schiffmann and actress Ali MacGraw, was also filmed on the dunes.

== Geography ==
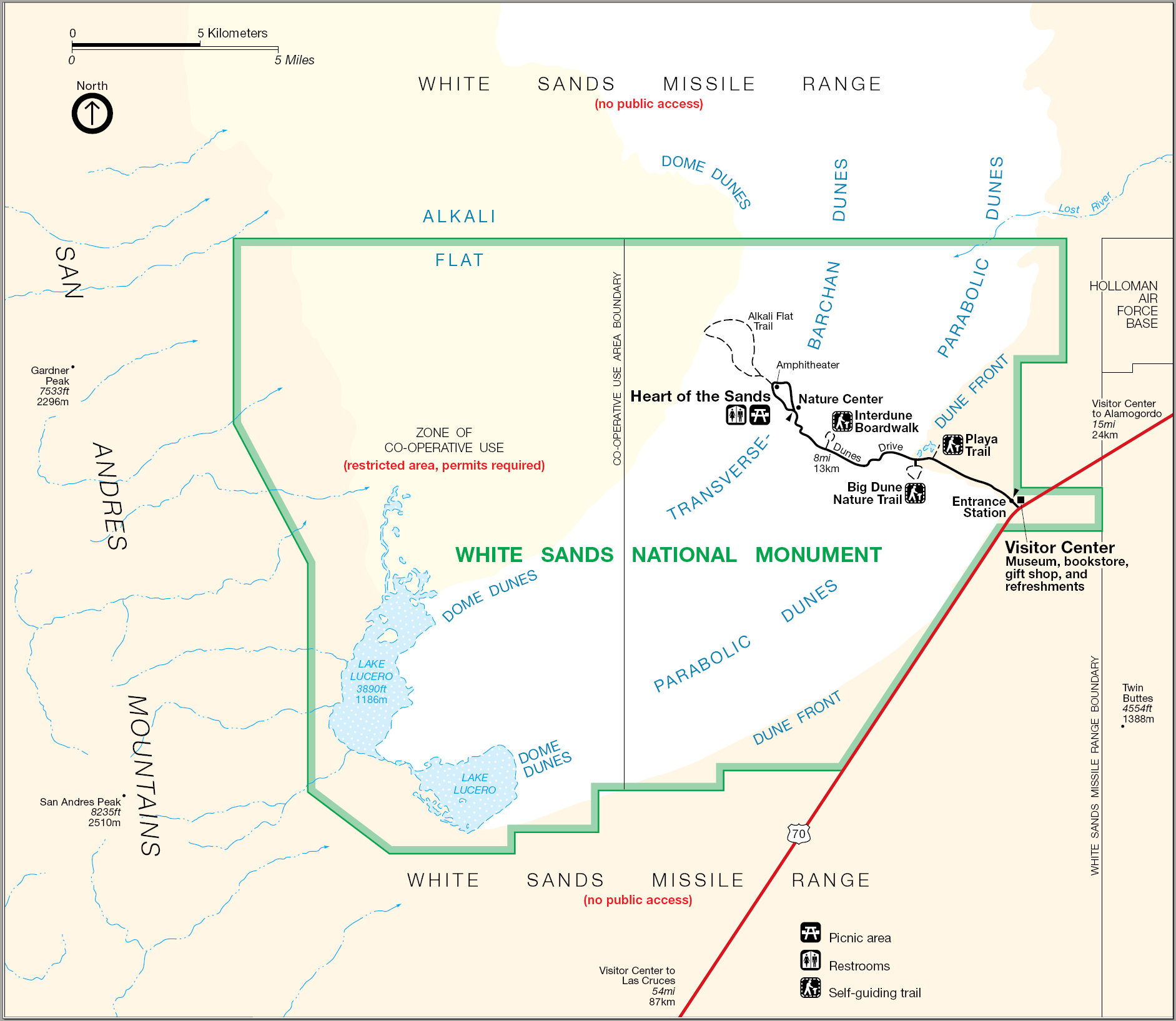
Map of the park and part of White Sands Missile Range prior to the national park designation

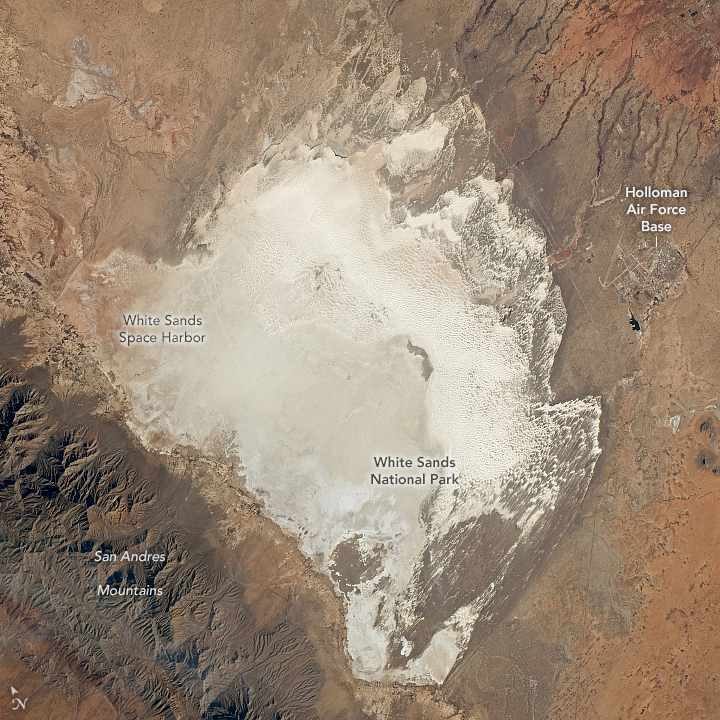
New Mexico’s White Sands photomap, December 26, 2022. Photo from ISS.

White Sands National Park is located in southern New Mexico, on the north side of U.S. Route 70 approximately 15 miles (24 km) southwest of Alamogordo and 52 miles (84 km) northeast of Las Cruces, in western Otero County and northeastern Doña Ana County. The closest commercial airport is in El Paso, Texas, about 85 miles (137 km) away. The park is situated in the Tularosa Basin with elevations ranging from 3,887 feet (1,185 m) at Lake Lucero, to 4,116 feet (1,255 m) at a former military site called NE 30.

The park's primary feature is the field of white sand dunes composed of gypsum crystals. The gypsum dunefield is the largest of its kind on Earth. The park protects 115 mi^{2} (300 km^{2}) of the 275 mi^{2} (710 km^{2}) dunefield, about 42%, while the remaining 160 mi^{2} (410 km^{2}) are located to the north within White Sands Missile Range. The depth of gypsum sand across the entire field is about 30 feet (9.1 m) below the interdunal surface. At the same time, the tallest dunes are about 60 feet (18 m) high. About 4.5 billion short tons (4.1 billion metric tons) of gypsum sand fill the dunefield, which formed about 7,000–10,000 years ago.

Total park acreage is 148,588 acres (232.2 sq mi; 601.3 km^{2}), which includes a net 4,855 acres (7.6 sq mi; 19.6 km^{2}) added in 2019 when the national park designation modified the boundaries between the park and the missile range. The missile range borders the park on all sides, with a cooperative use area designated in the park's western portion where public access is only allowed by permit. The cooperative use area includes most of the Alkali Flat region in the park's northwestern quadrant, as well as Lake Lucero and dome dunes in the southwestern quadrant. The San Andres Mountains rise beyond the park's western boundary. At the same time, Holloman Air Force Base is a short distance to the east. A rock formation called the Twin Buttes is located to the south on land administered by the Bureau of Land Management.

== Climate ==
According to the Köppen climate classification system, White Sands National Park has a continental or cold semi-arid climate (BSk), bordering closely on a cold desert climate (BWk). Daily means resemble those of a humid subtropical climate (Cfa), though its relatively high elevation and low precipitation cause a higher diurnal temperature variation and shorter growing season than would be typical of such a climate. The growing season generally lasts less than six months, from April 27 to October 19 on average.

The warmest months are April through October when the average high temperature reaches or exceeds 79 °F (26 °C) and the daily mean temperature is in the range 60–81 °F (16–27 °C). Afternoon temperatures in June and July average around 97 °F (36 °C). The highest recorded temperature is 111 °F (44 °C), set on June 22, 1981. The cooler months are November through March, when the average low temperature is below 32 °F (0 °C) and the daily mean temperature is in the range 39–52 °F (4–11 °C), with December and January being the coldest months. The lowest recorded temperature is −25 °F (−32 °C), set on January 11, 1962.

The average annual precipitation is 9.81 inches (249 mm), with the wettest month being August at 1.88 inches (48 mm). July through October have the most rainy days, averaging four to seven days per month. The remaining months have an average of two or three days with precipitation. Snow may occur from November through March, with an average accumulation of 1.6 inches (41 mm).

Climate data for White Sands National Monument, New Mexico, 1991–2020 normals, extremes 1939–present
Month	Jan	Feb	Mar	Apr	May	Jun	Jul	Aug	Sep	Oct	Nov	Dec	Year
Record high °F (°C)	78 (26)	85 (29)	91 (33)	97 (36)	104 (40)	111 (44)	110 (43)	110 (43)	104 (40)	97 (36)	88 (31)	84 (29)	111 (44)
Mean maximum °F (°C)	70.4 (21.3)	75.8 (24.3)	84.5 (29.2)	90.0 (32.2)	98.8 (37.1)	105.9 (41.1)	105.8 (41.0)	102.4 (39.1)	98.3 (36.8)	91.4 (33.0)	79.7 (26.5)	70.9 (21.6)	107.1 (41.7)
Mean daily maximum °F (°C)	57.0 (13.9)	63.0 (17.2)	71.1 (21.7)	79.0 (26.1)	88.0 (31.1)	97.3 (36.3)	97.0 (36.1)	94.8 (34.9)	88.8 (31.6)	79.3 (26.3)	66.6 (19.2)	56.5 (13.6)	78.2 (25.7)
Daily mean °F (°C)	39.7 (4.3)	44.9 (7.2)	52.2 (11.2)	59.9 (15.5)	69.2 (20.7)	78.8 (26.0)	81.2 (27.3)	79.2 (26.2)	72.5 (22.5)	60.8 (16.0)	48.0 (8.9)	39.4 (4.1)	60.5 (15.8)
Mean daily minimum °F (°C)	22.4 (−5.3)	26.7 (−2.9)	33.4 (0.8)	40.9 (4.9)	50.4 (10.2)	60.4 (15.8)	65.4 (18.6)	63.5 (17.5)	56.2 (13.4)	42.4 (5.8)	29.4 (−1.4)	22.3 (−5.4)	42.8 (6.0)
Mean minimum °F (°C)	9.3 (−12.6)	12.4 (−10.9)	16.0 (−8.9)	25.6 (−3.6)	33.9 (1.1)	47.5 (8.6)	56.5 (13.6)	55.2 (12.9)	43.2 (6.2)	26.8 (−2.9)	13.6 (−10.2)	8.1 (−13.3)	5.2 (−14.9)
Record low °F (°C)	−25 (−32)	−14 (−26)	0 (−18)	11 (−12)	20 (−7)	36 (2)	48 (9)	45 (7)	30 (−1)	13 (−11)	−12 (−24)	−8 (−22)	−25 (−32)
Average precipitation inches (mm)	0.50 (13)	0.38 (9.7)	0.24 (6.1)	0.30 (7.6)	0.45 (11)	0.72 (18)	1.64 (42)	1.88 (48)	1.46 (37)	1.05 (27)	0.45 (11)	0.74 (19)	9.81 (249)
Average snowfall inches (cm)	0.8 (2.0)	0.0 (0.0)	0.0 (0.0)	0.0 (0.0)	0.0 (0.0)	0.0 (0.0)	0.0 (0.0)	0.0 (0.0)	0.0 (0.0)	0.1 (0.25)	0.0 (0.0)	0.7 (1.8)	1.6 (4.1)
Average precipitation days (≥ 0.01 in)	3.3	2.7	2.2	1.9	2.4	3.3	6.9	6.8	4.9	4.0	2.4	2.8	43.6
Average snowy days (≥ 0.1 in)	0.4	0.0	0.0	0.0	0.0	0.0	0.0	0.0	0.0	0.2	0.0	0.3	0.9
Source: NOAA

== Geology ==
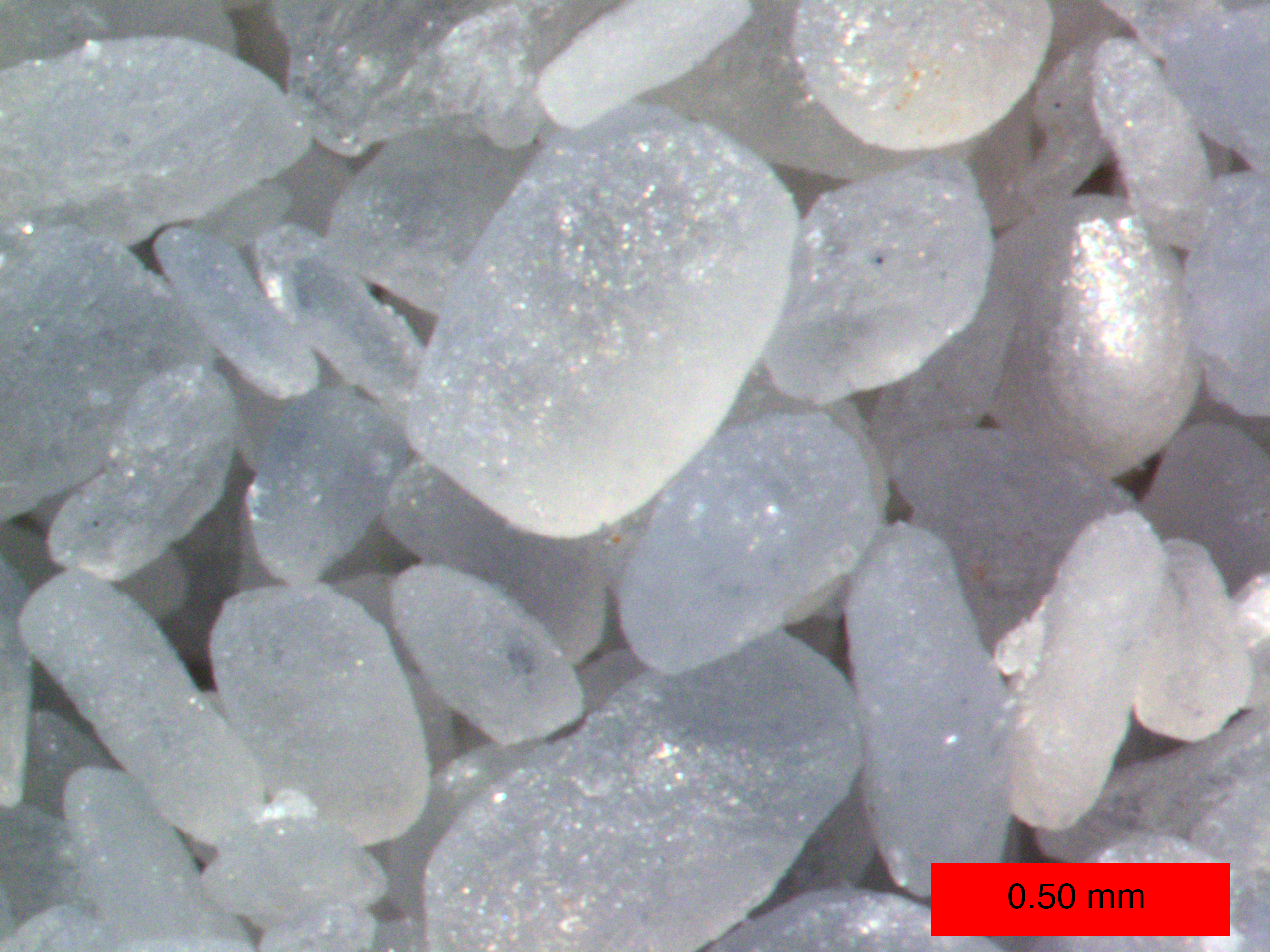
Gypsum sand

During the Permian Period, shallow seas covered the area that today forms White Sands National Park. The seas left behind gypsum (calcium sulfate), and subsequent tectonic activity lifted areas of the gypsum-rich seabed to form part of the San Andres and Sacramento Mountains. Over time, rain dissolved the water-soluble gypsum in the mountains, and rivers carried it to the Tularosa Basin, which has no outlet to the sea. The trapped water sank into the ground or formed shallow pools that subsequently dried out, leaving the gypsum on the surface in a crystalline form called selenite. Groundwater that flows out of the Tularosa Basin flows south into the Hueco Basin. During the last ice age, a 1,600-square-mile (4,144 km^{2}) body of water named Lake Otero covered much of the basin. When it dried out, a large flat area of selenite crystals remained, which is named the Alkali Flat.

Lake Lucero is a dry lakebed in the southwest corner of the park, at one of the lowest points in the basin. Rain and snowmelt from the surrounding mountains and upwelling from deep groundwater within the basin periodically fill Lake Lucero with water containing dissolved gypsum. When filled, the lake covers about 10 square miles (26 km^{2}) at a depth of 2–3 ft (0.61–0.91 m). As the water evaporates, small selenite crystals about 1 inch (2.5 cm) in diameter form on the surface of the lake. Most of the crystal formation occurs when large floods concentrate the mineralized water every ten to fourteen years. Wind and water break down the crystals into progressively smaller particles until they are fine grains of white gypsum sand.

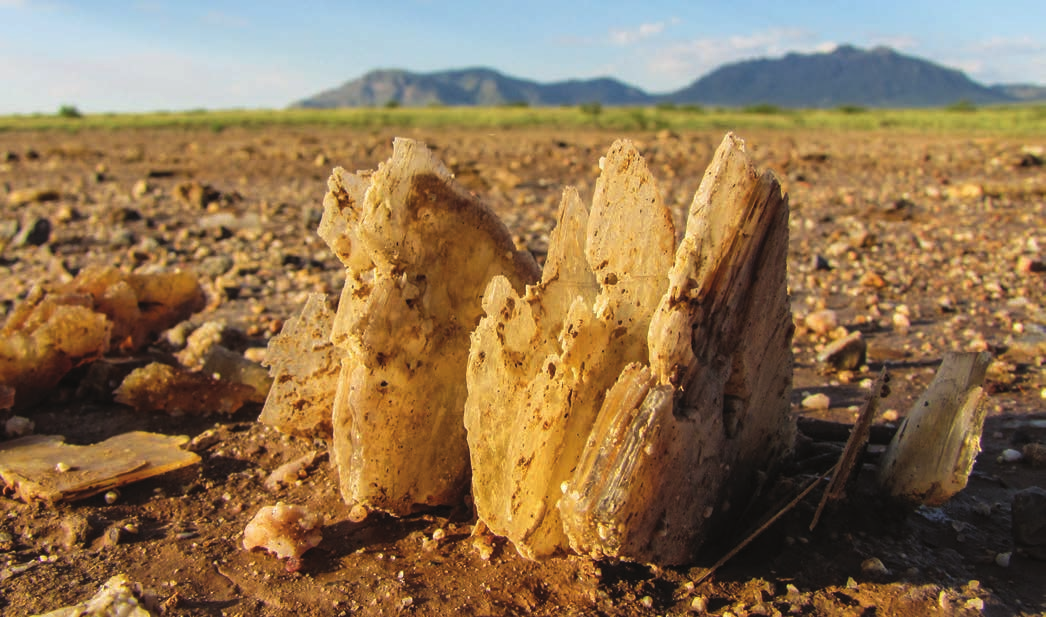
Selenite crystal

The ground in the Alkali Flat and along Lake Lucero's shore is also covered with selenite crystals that measure up to 3 ft (0.9 m) long. Weathering and erosion eventually break the crystals into sand-size grains that are carried away by the prevailing winds from the southwest, forming the white dunes. The dunes constantly change shape and slowly move downwind. Since gypsum is water-soluble, the sand that composes the dunes may dissolve and cement together after rain, forming a layer of sand that is more solid, which increases the wind resistance of the dunes. The increased resistance does not prevent dunes from quickly covering the plants in their path. Some species of plants can grow fast enough to avoid being buried by the dunes, while others utilize survival strategies such as the formation of a hardened pedestal around their roots to stabilize the plant amid the moving dunes.

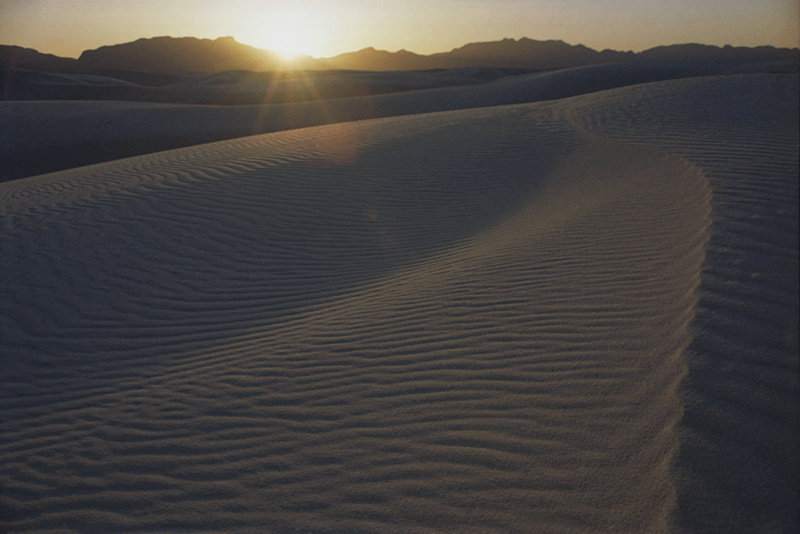
Parabolic dune at sunset

White Sands contains various forms of dunes. Dome dunes are found along the southwest margins of the field, transverse and barchan dunes in the center of the field, and parabolic dunes along the northern, southern, and northeastern margins. Scientists have surveyed a 9.3-mile (15 km) long strip of dunes with lasers; installed shallow water wells across the dunefield; looked at the chemistry and age of the water below the dunes; measured hundreds of thousands of individual sand grains from across the dunes; and used satellites to see temperature and moisture changes throughout the year.

Toward the western side of the dunefield, the dunes are more than 50 ft (15 m) tall, and they become progressively smaller toward the eastern edge, until they come to an abrupt stop at the eastern boundary. Throughout the dunes, water is only a few feet (a meter) from the surface and very salty, but toward the western edge of the dunefield, the water is older and even saltier. The depth to groundwater also decreases from 5 ft (1.5 m) below the surface on the eastern end to only 1–2 ft (0.3–0.6 m) on the western end of the dunefield. The dunes at the western end have very little vegetation and move very quickly, while the dunes on the eastern end move very slowly and are very vegetated. Toward the western edge, the sand grains become larger and have all different shapes, while at the eastern edge, they are all very small and round. The dunefield is much cooler and wetter than the surrounding hot, desert soils based on satellite images. Scientists have discovered what appear to be old lakeshores beneath the dunes using laser scanning technology. At each of these old lakeshore terraces, the dune movement and type of dunes change greatly.

== Ecology ==
More than 600 invertebrates, 300 plants, 250 birds, 50 mammals, 30 reptiles, seven amphibians, and one fish species inhabit White Sands National Park. Animal species that have a white or off-white coloration include three mammals, three reptiles, one amphibian, and numerous insects. At least 45 species are endemic, living only in this park, with 40 of them being moth species, along with the Apache pocket mouse (Perognathus flavescens Apachii), White Sands woodrat (Neotoma micropus leucophaea), bleached earless lizard (Holbrookia maculata ruthveni), and two camel crickets.

=== Flora ===
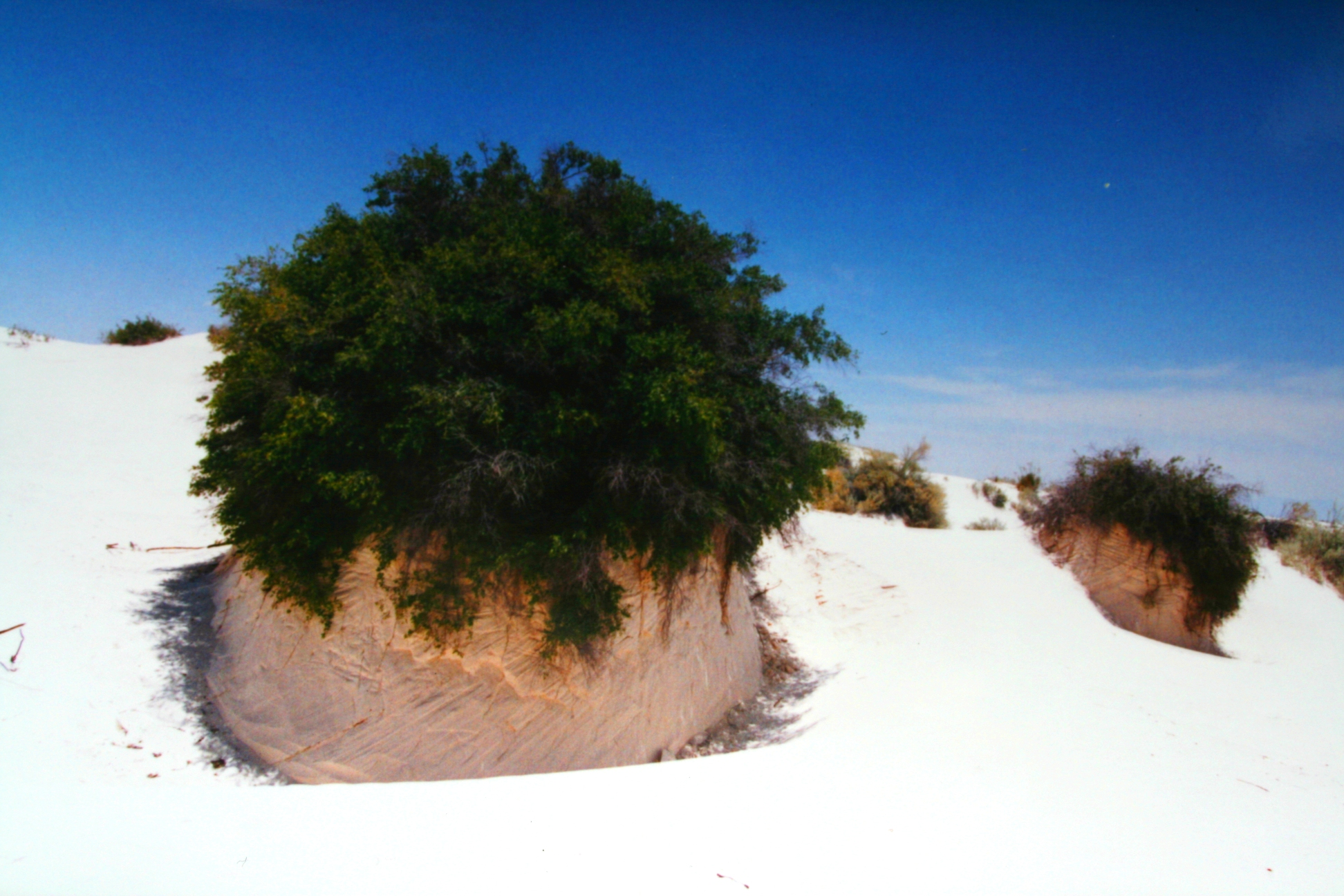
A skunkbush sumac growing on a gypsum plant stand, or pedestal

The plants at White Sands National Park stabilize the leading edges of the dunes, providing both food and shelter for wildlife. Humans have made extensive use of the dunefield's native plant life, using some for food and others to create cloth and medicine. Native Americans wove mats with the thicker blades of grass, and consumed some of the grass seeds.

The park's flora must be tough to live in the nutrient-poor alkaline soil of the dunefield. Drought-tolerant plants are able to survive in temperatures that range from sub-freezing to over 100 °F (38 °C), depending on the season. Many of these plants also tolerate the high concentrations of salt, while gypsophiles thrive in these conditions.

The cane cholla and other cacti, as well as desert succulents like the soaptree yucca, are able to store water through the hot summers and dry winters, blooming in the spring. Desert grasses have developed a tolerance for the highly alkaline soil. Grass species like alkali sacaton and Indian rice grass provide food for many tiny animals, such as Apache pocket mice and kangaroo rats. Grass seeds produce a protein-rich kernel that dries well and fills many rodents' underground granaries.

Native Americans used many parts of the soaptree yucca. The young flower stalks are rich in vitamin C, while the flower pods can be boiled or roasted. The leaf fibers were used for the fabrication of rope, matting, sandals, baskets, and coarse cloth. The roots were chopped and boiled to produce soap to wash hair, blankets, and rugs.

Other plants include skunkbush sumac, Rio Grande cottonwood (Populus deltoides wislizeni), hoary rosemary mint, purple sand verbena (Abronia angustifolia), Mormon tea (also known as longleaf jointfir), and claret cup cactus whose fruit is among the sweetest of any desert plant. American Indians used the hoary rosemary mint for seasoning foods, and the purple sand verbena as a mild sedative. They used the skunkbush sumac's berries to make a tart drink, while the flexible stems were used for basketry and binding. The sumac's branches contain tannin, which is useful in producing dyes, and its leaves were used as an astringent to treat stings, bites, rashes, and sunburn. The cholla's fruit can be eaten raw or cooked, while its flower buds were used as a diuretic, and a hair tonic was made from its roots. Strips of the cottonwood's branches and bark were woven into baskets. The tree's buds and flowers are edible, and its bark was used for treating bruises, strains, and sprains. A tea made from cottonwood bark is an anti-inflammatory agent and mild diuretic. The Mormon tea plant contains traces of ephedrine, which is a stimulant and decongestant effective in countering symptoms of the common cold.

=== Fauna ===
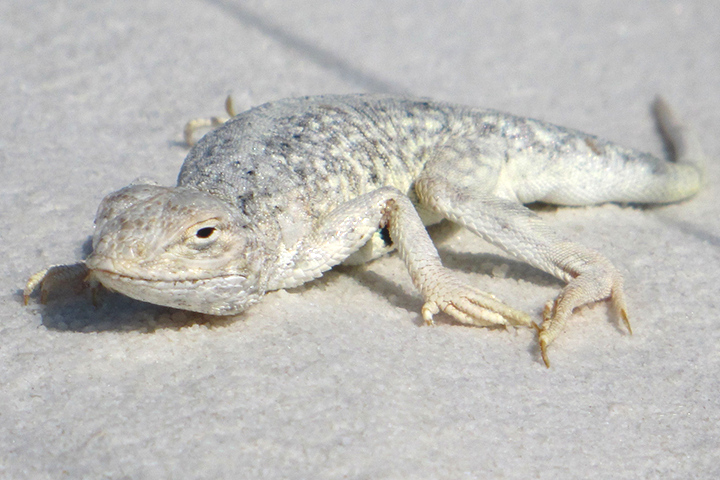
The bleached earless lizard (Holbrookia maculata ruthveni) is capable of hearing, though it has no external ear openings.

More than 800 animal species inhabit the park, many of them nocturnal. Several species of animals have developed very specialized means of survival in this harsh environment, enabling them to thrive in a place with very little surface water and highly mineralized groundwater. Some species that inhabit the dunes have gradually changed color through centuries of evolution, becoming substantially lighter than their cousins elsewhere. Many of these white species are endemic to the park. The Apache pocket mouse, bleached earless lizard, sand-treader camel cricket, sand wolf spider, and moth species including Protogygia whitesandsensis and Givira delindae are among the white animals inhabiting the dunefield. Lighter colored animals blend in with their white surroundings better than darker animals, which helps them to avoid predation, allowing them more time to reproduce.

Invertebrates form the largest group with more than 600 species, including varied species of spiders, wasps, beetles, and moths. Spider species include Apache jumping spider, burrowing wolf spider, funnel-web spider (Agelenopsis longistylus), tarantula, and western black widow spider. Other arachnid species include sand scorpion (Paruroctonus utahensis), and wind scorpion. Insect species include white-lined sphinx moth, yucca moth, bleached skimmer dragonfly, tarantula hawk wasp, minor ground mantis, toothpick grasshopper, walking stick, Maricopa harvester ant, and darkling beetle. The Maricopa harvester ant inhabits much of the Southwestern United States and is believed to have the most toxic insect venom in the world. Humans may experience up to four hours of intense pain, while the equivalent of twelve ant stings is capable of killing a 4.4 lb (2 kg) rat.

As of November 2019, 246 species of birds have been recorded, including wrens, mockingbirds, and ravens, as well as larger species like roadrunners and raptors. Fourteen species are listed as common, meaning they may be seen daily but not in large numbers, while the others are seen only a few times each month, each year, or every few years. The most commonly seen species are: mourning dove, turkey vulture, Swainson's hawk, red-tailed hawk, ash-throated flycatcher, Chihuahuan raven, common raven, northern mockingbird, house finch, Brewer's sparrow, black-throated sparrow, white-crowned sparrow, and great-tailed grackle. Cactus wrens have a long white streak over their eyes, a cluster of black spots on their breast, and make a somewhat ratchety call. They build their nests in cacti and feed by hopping under shrubs, hunting insects, or picking insects off the radiator grills of parked cars. Birds are usually observed in vegetated areas of the park away from the heart of the dunefield, mainly near the visitor center and the edges of the dunefield, as well as Lake Lucero. However, it is open to the public only once each month by guided tour.

A kangaroo rat hops past an attacking rattlesnake

Most mammals of the Tularosa Basin have adapted to the hot summers by staying in their dens until evening. Visitors may see footprints along the dunes as evidence of the nightly hunting and foraging excursions of nocturnal animals. Carnivorans include coyotes, bobcats, badgers, and kit foxes. Rabbits include desert cottontails and black-tailed jackrabbits, with the jackrabbit capable of speeds as high as 40 mph (64 km/h). Rodents include porcupines, pocket gophers, Apache pocket mice, and Merriam's kangaroo rats, the latter of which can jump up to 10 ft (3 m) high when frightened despite having only a 5 in (13 cm) body and an 8 in (20 cm) tail. The pallid bat eats insects in the air like other bats, but locates most of its food on the ground while walking around. Four other bat species have also been observed in the park, though the pallid bat is the most commonly seen species, roosting under the visitor center's eaves during the summer.

Among reptiles, the most common lizards include the bleached earless lizard, little white whiptail (Aspidoscelis gypsi – a white species that will detach its tail as an escape strategy), southwestern fence lizard, and side-blotched lizard. In contrast, the most common snakes are the coachwhip, Sonoran gopher snake, prairie rattlesnake, western diamondback rattlesnake, and the massasauga which is another species of rattlesnake, all of them venomous. The sole resident turtle species is the desert box turtle.

Seven species of amphibians inhabit the park, including three species of toads: the Great Plains toad, the western toad, and the red-spotted toad; three species of spadefoot toads: Couch's spadefoot toad, the plains spadefoot toad, and the New Mexico spadefoot toad, all of which have a single hard, dark spade on the underside of each hind foot that is used to burrow into the ground to prevent water loss and hide from predators; and one salamander species, the barred tiger salamander.

The White Sands pupfish is the only species of fish endemic to the Tularosa Basin, and the only fish found in the park. The pupfish has dark eyes, silver scales, and grows from 1.75–2.5 inches (44–64 mm) in length.

== Paleontology ==
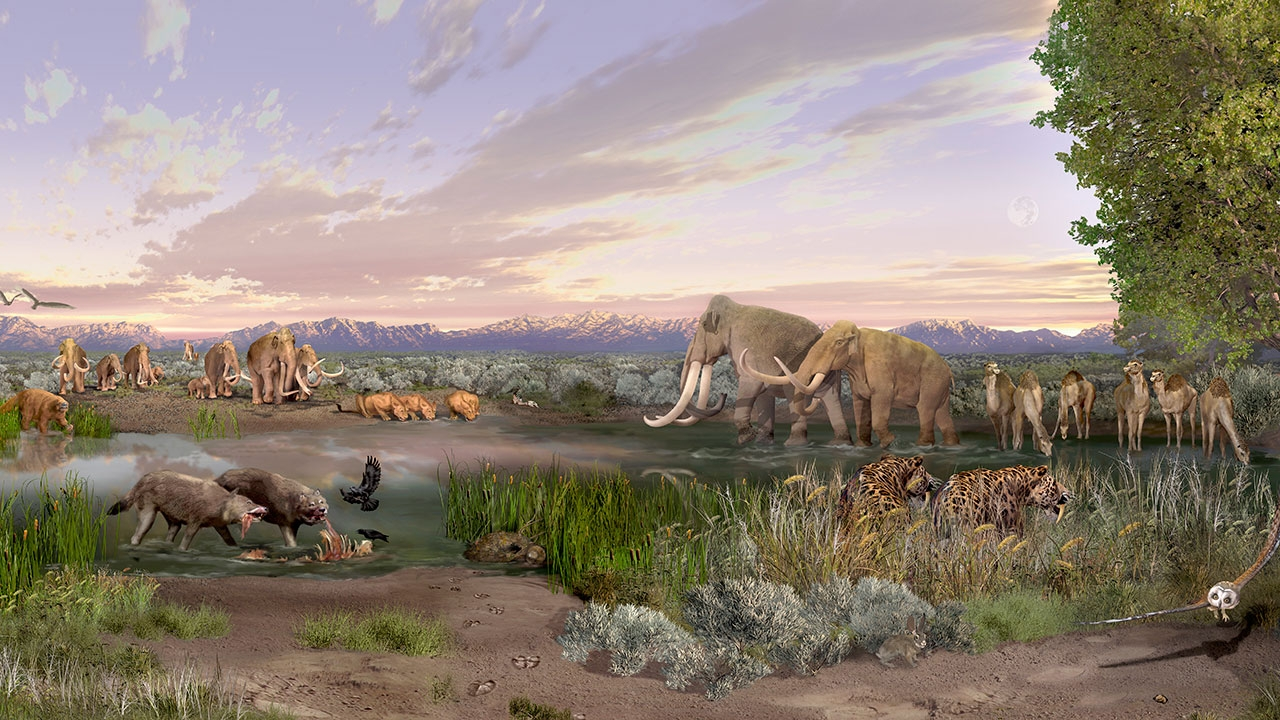
A herd of Columbian mammoths, a ground sloth (left background), dire wolves (left foreground), lions (center/left background), camels (right background), and saber-toothed cats (right foreground, in reeds) gather at a water source

Before the Pleistocene epoch ended about 12,000 years ago, the land within the Tularosa Basin featured large lakes, streams, and grasslands. The climate was wetter and cooler, producing a lot more rain and snow than in the present. Lake Otero was one of the largest lakes in the southwest, covering 1,600 square miles (4,144 km^{2}), which is an area larger than the state of Rhode Island.

The basin teemed with life, including large ice age mammals that lived by the shores of Lake Otero and in the surrounding grasslands. Columbian mammoths, ground sloths, ancient camels, dire wolves, lions, and saber-toothed cats—also known as saber-toothed tigers, though not closely related to tigers—all crossed the Tularosa Basin where the dunes lie presently. The animals left fossil footprints as they walked the muddy shores of Lake Otero, their body weight compressing the wet clay and gypsum. The wind uncovers the fragile tracks, then rapidly erodes, with many tracks disappearing after only two years.

Scattered along the now dried lakebed are trackways of ancient camels and Columbian mammoths. The fossilized footprints appear to gather around ancient pools of water. For 80 years, only a small collection of fossil footprints had been found in the park; however, a group of scientists noticed dark spots dotting the expanse of the lakebed that appeared to be footprints. During the 2010s, footprints of a dire wolf were discovered beside ancient seeds dated to more than 18,000 years ago. The fossil footprints of ground sloths have also been found in the park. Paleolithic human footprints are sometimes found interacting with Ice Age animals. One set of footprints shows the stalking of sloths. The paleo-humans who lived in the Tularosa Basin left behind no other evidence of their passage. Though stone flakes from toolmaking, arrowheads, and spear points are found in surrounding areas, they are the artifacts of humans who lived after the Ice Age. The lakebed is nearly devoid of a single artifact from before the Spanish exploration in the 1500s. In a study of exposed outcrops of Lake Otero in 2021, Bennett et al. reveal numerous human footprints dating to about 23,000 to 21,000 years ago which provide strong evidence of pre-Clovis occupation of the American continents.

=== Carnivores ===
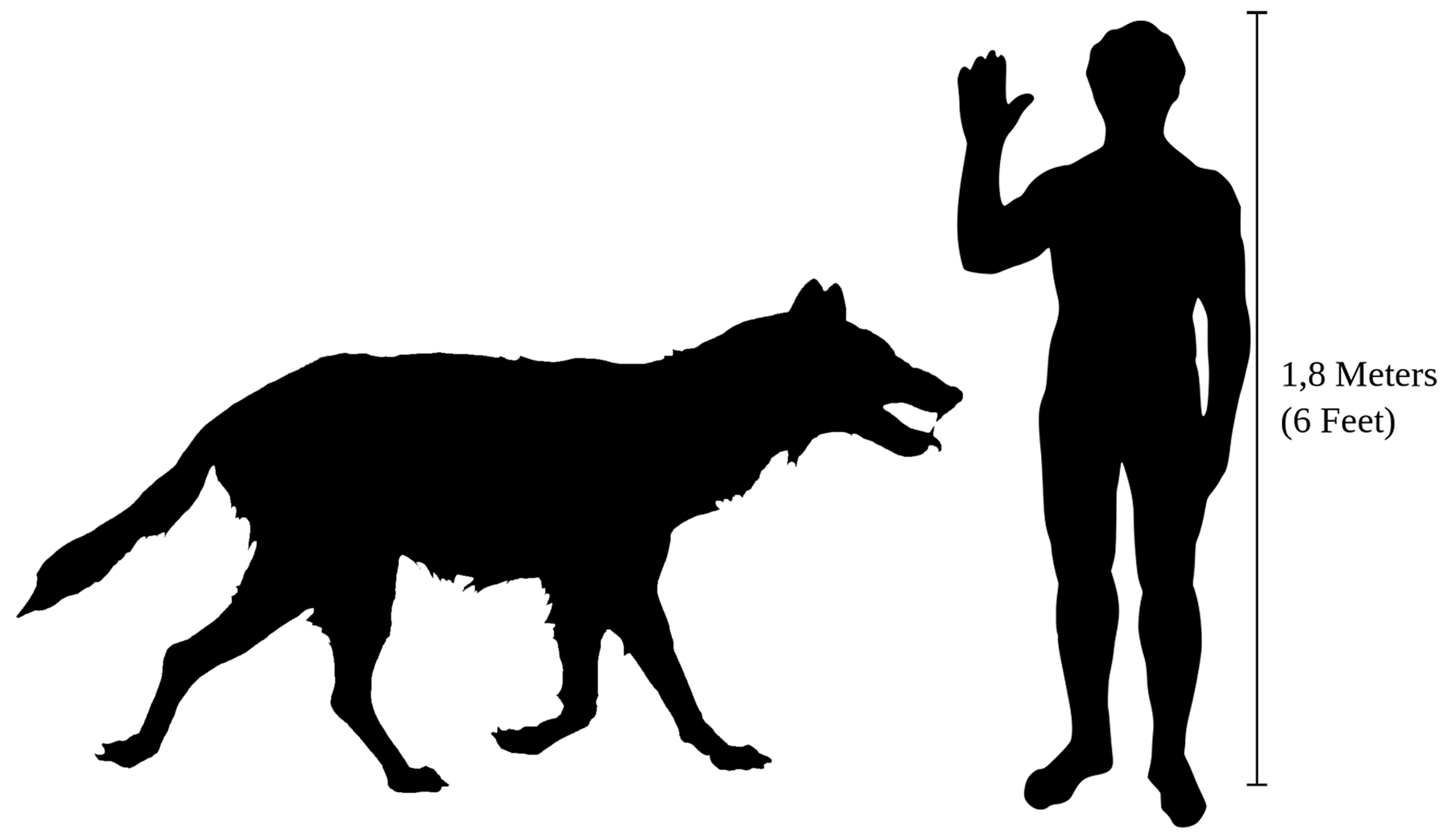
Dire wolf and human, size comparison

Dire wolves lived in North and South America during the Pleistocene. Standing at about 2.6–2.8 feet (80–85 cm) tall and weighing 130–150 pounds (60–68 kg), they were about the same size as modern gray wolves, but with a heavier, more muscular build. They had powerful jaws, with a stronger bite than modern wolves, and probably hunted in packs, allowing them to target larger prey such as horses and bison.

During the Pleistocene, large cats lived throughout the world, including lions in North America. About four feet (1.2 m) tall at the shoulder and weighing over 500 pounds (230 kg), American lions had long, slender legs for chasing down prey. They hunted by ambushing animals like deer, camels, ground sloths, bison, and young mammoths.

Saber-toothed cats are known for their oversized canine teeth, which could reach seven to ten inches (17–20 cm) in length. Standing around 3 feet (one meter) tall and weighing up to 750 pounds (340 kg), saber-toothed cats had a bulky, muscular build that allowed them to subdue large prey, like sloths, bison, and young mammoths. Some fossil evidence suggests that they may have hunted in packs.

=== Herbivores ===
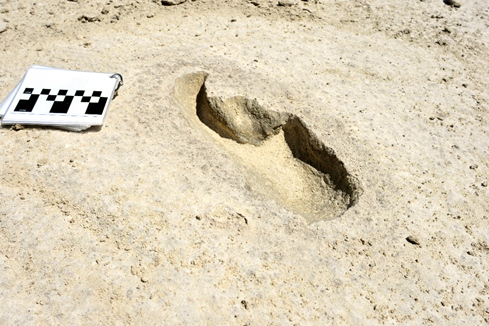
Fossil footprint of a Harlan's ground sloth

Columbian mammoths stood up to 14 feet (over four meters) tall at the shoulder and weighed 18,000–22,000 pounds (8,000–10,000 kilograms). They had large tusks and ridged teeth for eating plants like modern elephants. These giant herbivores probably did not have much hair, unlike the woolly mammoths that evolved in colder regions. Columbian mammoths inhabited a range from Canada to Nicaragua and Honduras.

Camels are commonly associated with Africa, though they originated in North America. The ancient western camel probably resembled modern, one-humped dromedary camels, but with longer legs, standing up to seven feet (over two meters) tall at the shoulder. The camels were opportunistic herbivores, grazing over large ranges and leaving distinctive footprints.

Ground sloths are the ancient relatives of modern tree sloths, armadillos, and anteaters. The Harlan's ground sloth dwarfed modern relatives, standing 10 feet (three meters) tall when upright and weighing over a ton (about 2,200–2,400 pounds or 1000–1090 kilograms). These giant herbivores had a slow, waddling walk and left kidney-bean-shaped footprints, created as their back feet rotated inwards while walking. Some ground sloth prints appear bipedal, possibly caused by the large hind feet covering the tracks of the smaller front feet. Such tracks have sometimes been mistaken for the tracks of a giant human.

== Visitation ==
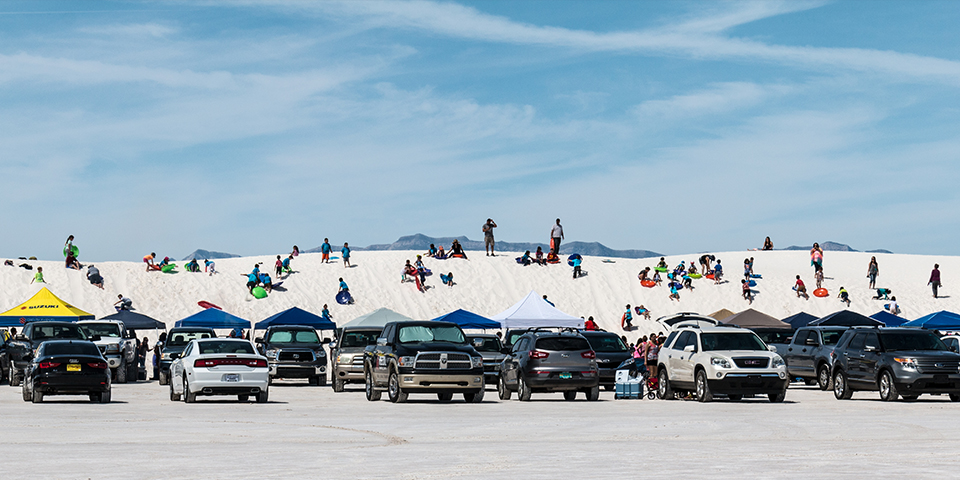
Visitors sledding down the dunes

White Sands National Park is the most visited NPS site in New Mexico, with about 600,000 visitors each year. In year two of the pandemic, White Sands National Park saw more than 780,000 visitors from both locals and visitors. Many visitors arrive during the warmer months from March through August, but sledders and photographers can be seen throughout the dunes year-round. March and July are the two busiest months with more than 60,000 visitors each, or about 2,000 per day, while November through February have the fewest visitors with less than 30,000 each month, or fewer than 1,000 per day.

The Dunes Drive leads 8 miles (13 km) into the dunes from the visitor center at the park entrance. Three picnic areas are available, as well as a backcountry campground with ten sites for overnight camping in the dunefield. Five marked trails totaling 9 miles (14 km) allow visitors to explore the dunes on foot. Ranger-guided orientation and nature walks occur at various times and months throughout the year. Sunset strolls are presented every evening of the year. At the same time, Lake Lucero hikes are offered once a month, from November to April, and full moon guided hikes from April to October, on the night before the full moon. The park participates in the Junior Ranger Program, with various age-group-specific activities.

Both the park and U.S. Route 70 between Las Cruces and Alamogordo are subject to closure for safety reasons when tests are conducted at White Sands Missile Range, which surrounds the park. Dunes Drive may be closed for periods of up to three hours during missile tests. Park staff are usually notified two weeks in advance of scheduled tests; however, notifications from White Sands Missile Range may be received as little as 24 hours in advance of a test. All activity, including horseback riding, backcountry camping, hiking, sledding, and driving on Dunes Drive, is prohibited during all missile tests that require road closure. According to a National Park Service report, in 2020, visitors spent roughly $22.5 million in nearby communities, with more than 360,000 more guests in 2021, and nearby towns felt the boost.

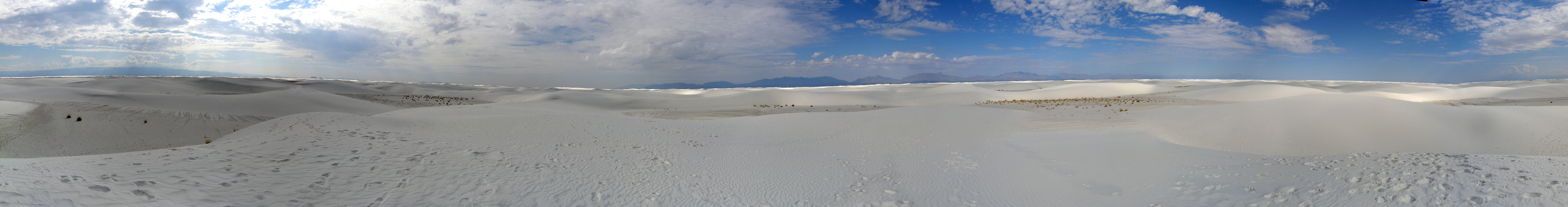
Panorama of the dune field from the Alkali Flat trail

== See also ==
- List of national parks of the United States
- National Register of Historic Places listings in Otero County, New Mexico
- Trinity Site – world's first nuclear weapon test, at White Sands Missile Range
