= Albert B. Fall =

American politician (1861–1944)

Albert Fall
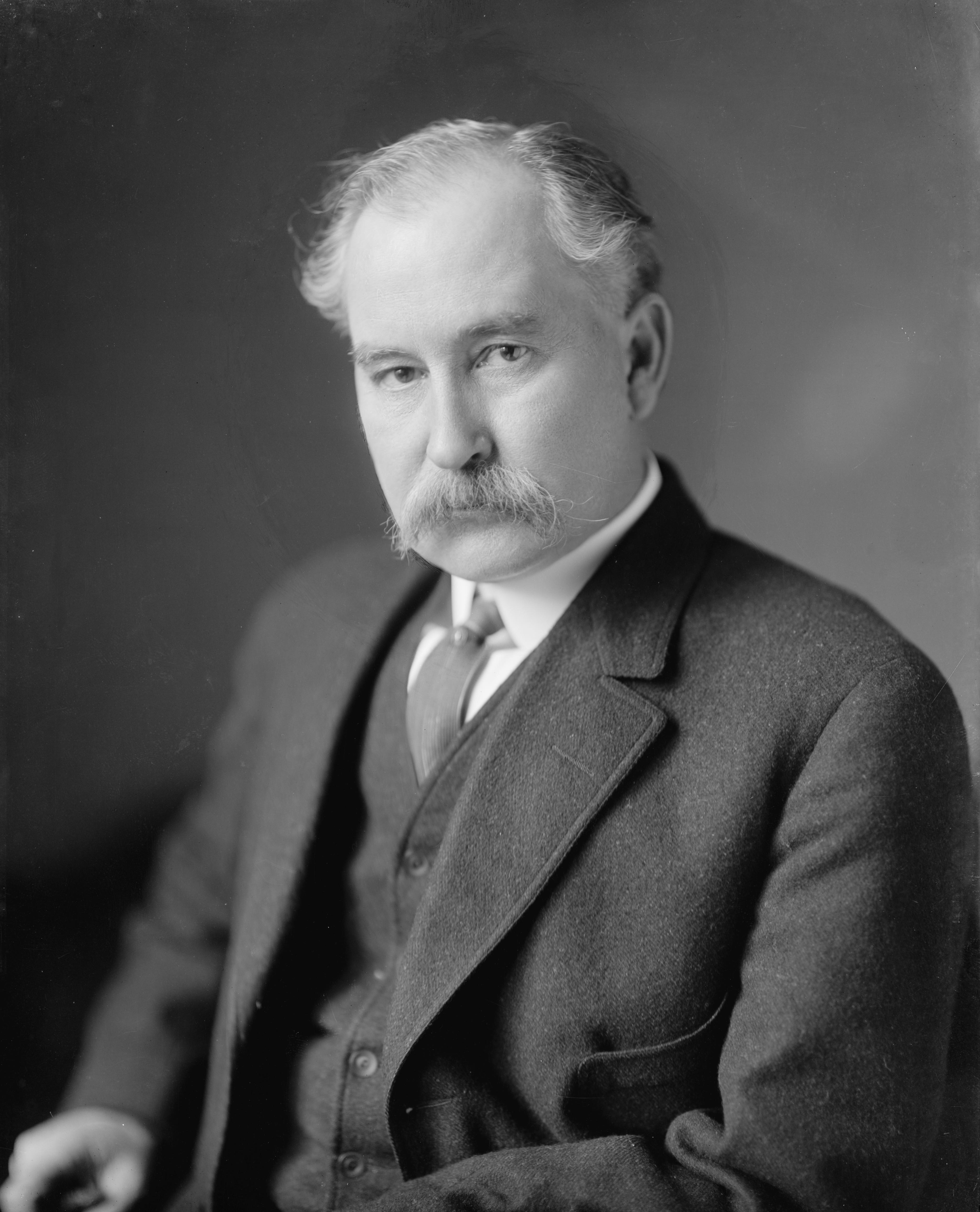
- Fall, 1905–1923

28th United States Secretary of the Interior
- In office March 5, 1921 – March 4, 1923
- President: Warren G. Harding
- Preceded by: John Payne
- Succeeded by: Hubert Work

United States Senator from New Mexico
- In office March 27, 1912 – March 4, 1921
- Preceded by: Seat established
- Succeeded by: Holm O. Bursum

Personal details
- Born: Albert Bacon Fall; November 26, 1861 Frankfort, Kentucky, U.S.
- Died: November 30, 1944 (aged 83) El Paso, Texas, U.S.
- Party: Republican
- Spouse: Emma Garland Morgan (m. 1883–1944)
- Children: 4

Military service
- Allegiance: United States
- Branch/service: United States Army
- Rank: Captain
- Battles/wars: Spanish-American War

Albert Bacon Fall (November 26, 1861 – November 30, 1944) was a United States senator from New Mexico and secretary of the interior under President Warren G. Harding who became infamous for his involvement in the Teapot Dome scandal; he was the only person convicted as a result of the affair. As a captain in the United States Army, he supported a military invasion of Mexico in 1916 as a means of ending Pancho Villa's raids.

== Early life and family ==
Albert Fall was born in Frankfort, Kentucky, to William R. and Edmonia Taylor Fall. He attended schools as a child in Nashville, Tennessee, but was primarily self-educated. By age eleven Fall was employed in a cotton factory. This is most likely the cause of respiratory health problems he suffered throughout his life. Due to his illnesses, Fall moved west as a young man to seek a better climate. He tried Oklahoma and Texas, but eventually he settled in Las Cruces, New Mexico Territory, where he practiced law. In a recent podcast, University of New Mexico School of Law professor Joshua Kastenberg detailed how Fall practiced the law of power as well as how he predicted Warren G. Harding's presidency.

Between 1879 and 1881, Fall worked as a teacher while he studied law. On May 7, 1883, he married Emma Garland Morgan in Clarksville, Texas. They had four children: a son, Jack Morgan Fall, and daughters Alexina Chase, Caroline Everhart and Jouett Elliott. Jack and Caroline died within a week of each other during the 1918 Spanish Flu pandemic. The Fall family lived at the Three Rivers Ranch in the Tularosa Basin. Fall also had a home in El Paso.

== Career ==
Fall was admitted to the bar in 1891. He served in the New Mexico House of Representatives from 1891 to 1892, and served on the territorial council from 1892 until 1893. Fall was appointed judge of the third judicial district in 1893, and associate justice of the New Mexico Supreme Court later the same year. Fall served on the Territorial Council again from 1896 to 1897, and as the territory's attorney general in 1897. He again served on the Territorial Council from 1902 to 1904.

During the Spanish–American War, Fall served as captain of an infantry company. He served as attorney general again in 1907. In 1910 he was a delegate to the territory's constitutional convention.

=== Albert Jennings Fountain murder case ===
Fall and his neighbor, Oliver M. Lee, were landowners in the area and were rivals to attorney Albert Jennings Fountain. Fall's association with Lee seems to have begun when Fall helped Lee in a criminal case. Lee, known for dispensing violence and terrorizing his enemies, employed William McNew and Jim Gilliland, both known as gunmen. Lee repeatedly rustled cattle from other ranches in the area, altering the brands to resemble his own. Fall's legal services ensured Lee and his men stayed free from criminal conviction; when they were arrested, Fall intervened on their behalf.

Fall disliked Fountain, who showed little fear of the Fall–Lee faction and challenged them openly in the courts and political arena. On February 1, 1896, Fountain and his eight-year-old son, Henry, disappeared near White Sands on the way from Fall's Three Rivers Ranch north of Tularosa to their home in Mesilla. Fall successfully defended Lee, McNew, and Gilliland when they were put on trial for Henry's murder in Hillsboro.

Evidence at the trial suggested Lee was involved in Fountain's murder and disappearance, but investigators had to deal with a corrupt court system and Fall's legal skill. The bodies of Fountain and his son and their horse were never found, which hampered the prosecution. The charges against McNew were dismissed by the court, while Lee and Gilliland were acquitted.

=== Pat Garrett case ===
In 1908, Fall successfully defended Jesse Wayne Brazel, the accused killer of former Sheriff Pat Garrett. Garrett, famous for killing outlaw Billy the Kid in 1881, had pursued the suspects in the Fountain murders.

=== Election to the Senate ===
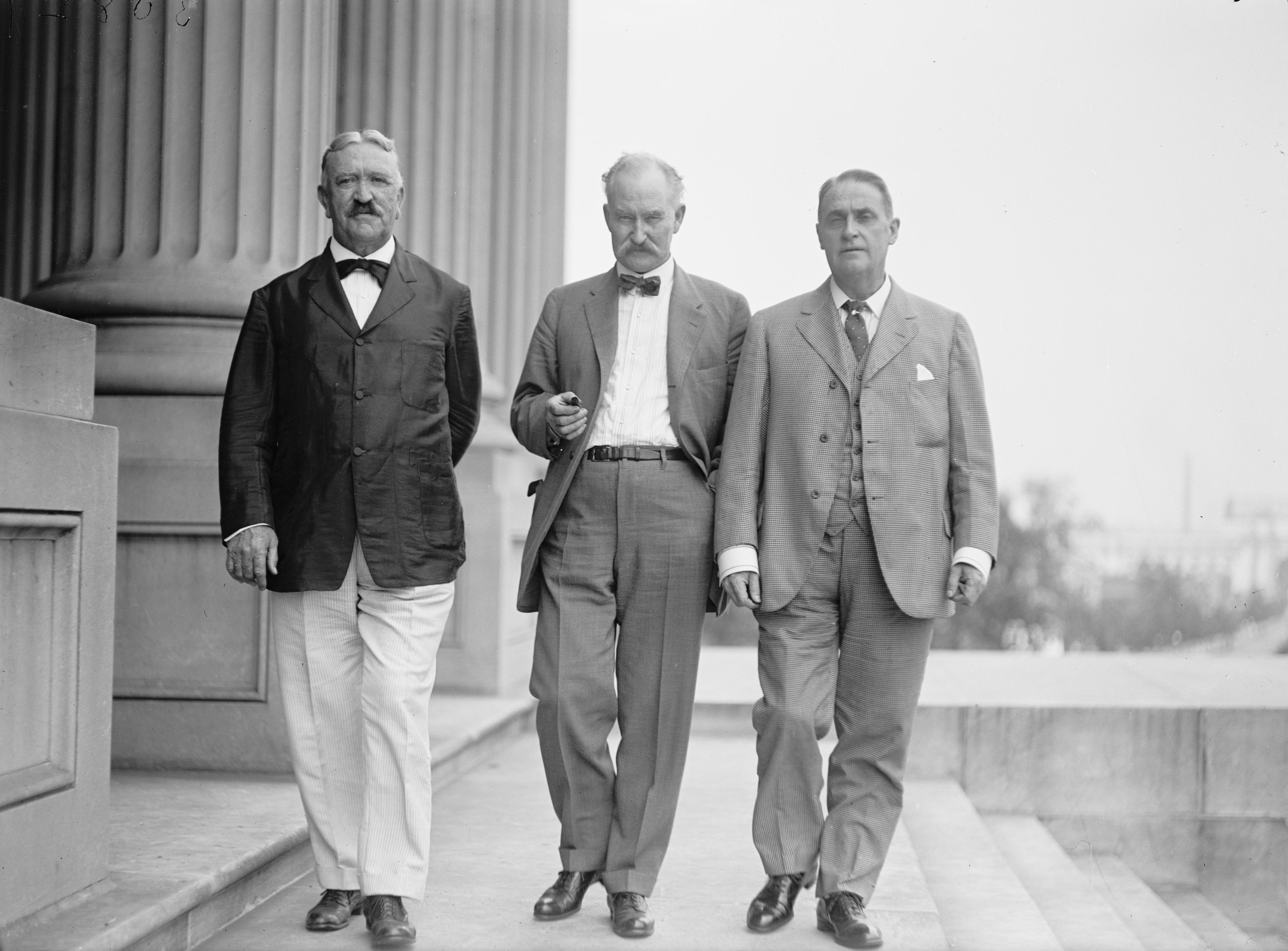
Fall (center) with U.S. Senators Marcus A. Smith (left) and Frank B. Brandegee (right) in 1918

As a member of the Republican Party, Fall was elected as one of the first U.S. Senators from New Mexico in 1912. It was widely known that he made a political alliance with Thomas B. Catron, the man who served alongside him, to ensure that both would be elected. This controversy made Fall a target of the local Republican Party, as they believed he had not contributed sufficiently to their efforts to secure New Mexico's statehood, and was not worthy of their nomination. The selection of Catron and Fall also disappointed Hispanics, who had hoped that one of their own would be selected. Fall was also severely disliked by Democrats.

Fall's unpopularity came to a head when, under Senate rules, his term ended in March 1913 and his name was put up again before the legislature for re-election. After various votes, the legislature re-elected Fall. However, Governor McDonald, on the advice of his Democratic legal advisor, Summers Burkhart, asserted that the legislature's procedure had been illegal and failed to sign the credentialing papers in an attempt to oust Fall by forcing a special session of the legislature and a new vote. The attempt failed; Fall won the special legislative election. When re-election came up in 1918, Fall was ambivalent about running, but nonetheless accepted the Republican nomination. In the general election he overcame a bitter challenge from Democrat William B. Walton, even though Fall never made a campaign speech. Some commentators suggest that it was sympathy for Fall's tragic loss of his two children in the flu pandemic that won him the election.

In the Senate, Fall served as chairman of the Committee on Expenditures in the Department of Commerce and Labor, was noted for his support of the suffrage movement and his extreme isolationist tendencies when the U.S. entered World War I. As a leading antagonist to President Woodrow Wilson, a Democrat, Fall was permitted to visit the stricken President in his White House bedroom in October 1919, hoping to gauge whether the Chief Executive was well enough to remain in office. "I have been praying for you, Sir," Fall sought to offer sincerely. "Which way, Senator?" Wilson replied, drawing laughter from his rival.

In the Senate, Fall become close friends with the people who would later make up the infamous Ohio Gang, which secured him a cabinet position in Warren G. Harding's administration in March 1921. While local politicians opposed him, his popularity with the residents of New Mexico was reportedly very high.

=== Teapot Dome scandal ===
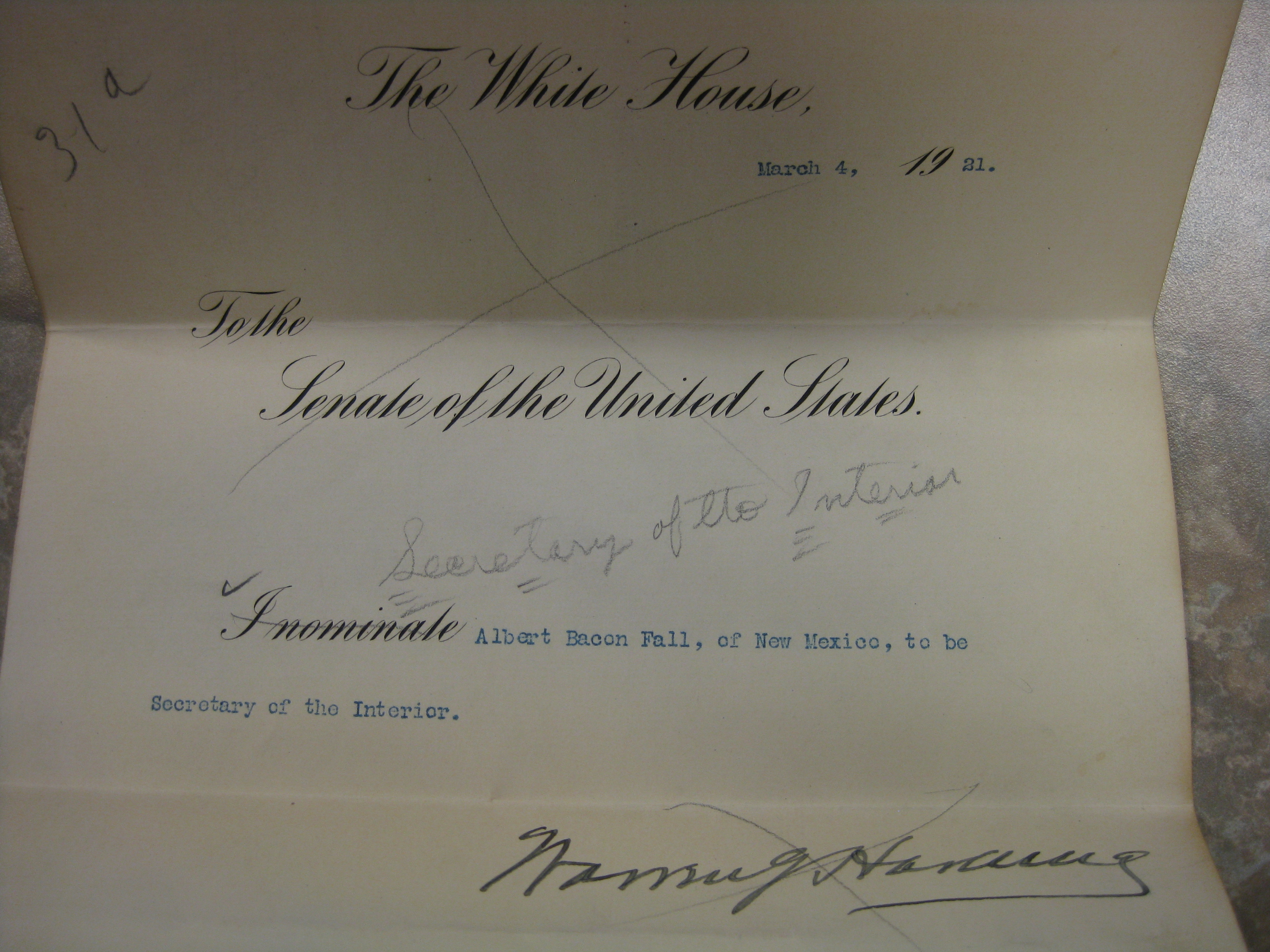
Albert Fall's Secretary of the Interior nomination

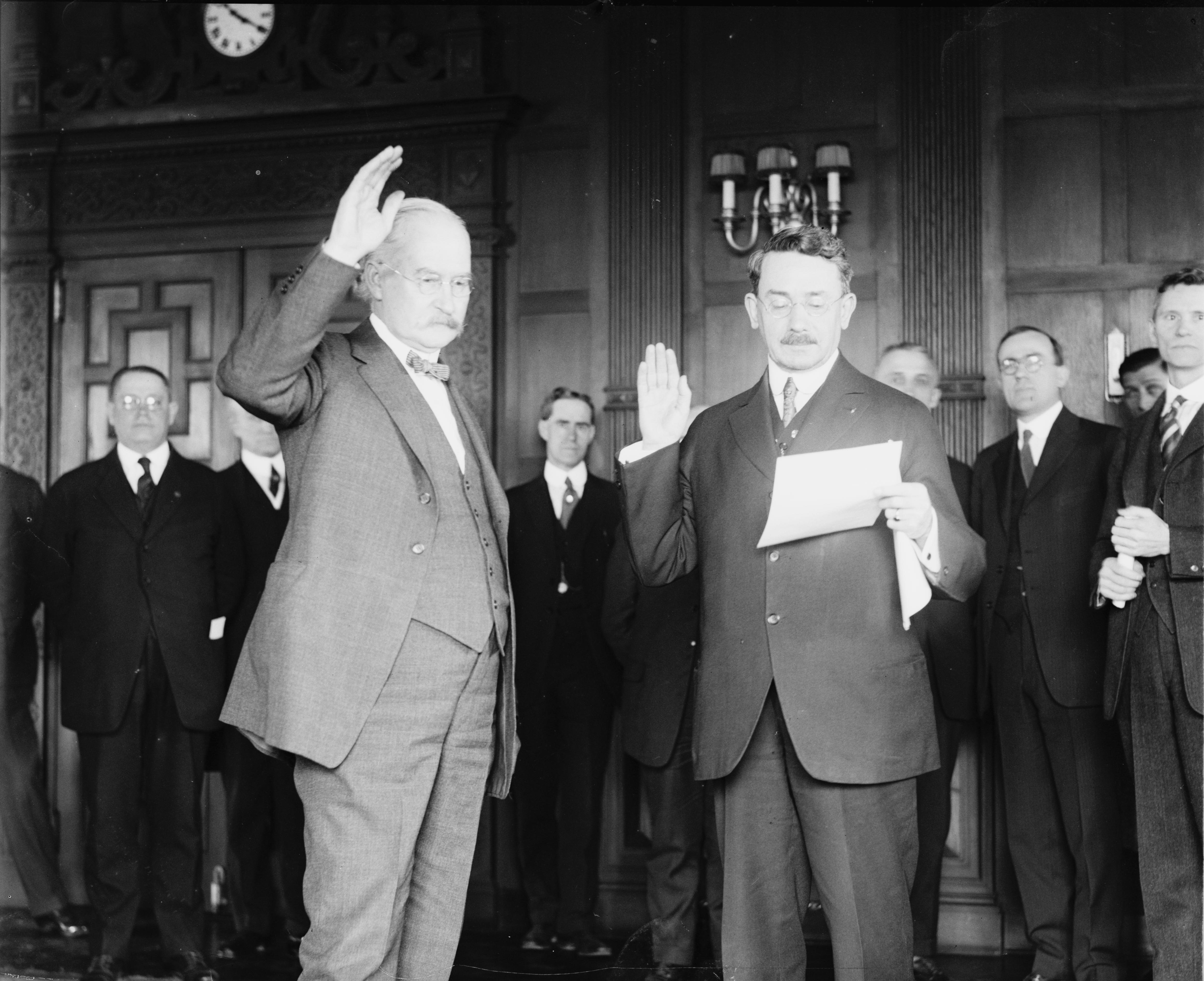
Swearing-in ceremony for Secretary of the Interior Albert Fall

Fall was appointed to the position of Secretary of the Interior by President Warren G. Harding in March 1921. Soon after his appointment, Harding convinced Edwin Denby, the Secretary of the Navy, that Fall's department should take over responsibility for the Naval Reserves at both Elk Hills and Buena Vista, California, and Teapot Dome, Wyoming. This last setting became the namesake of the scandal to erupt in April 1922, when The Wall Street Journal reported that Secretary Fall had decided that two of his friends, oilmen Harry F. Sinclair (Mammoth Oil Corporation) and Edward L. Doheny (Pan-American Petroleum and Transport Company), should be given leases to drill in parts of these Naval Reserves without open bidding. In exchange, Fall accepted bribes.

The investigation found Fall guilty of bribery and conspiracy on October 24, 1929 (exactly the same day as the Black Thursday) as a result of $385,000 having been paid to him by Edward L. Doheny. Fall was jailed for one year as a result—the first former cabinet officer sentenced to prison as a result of misconduct in office. Doheny was not only acquitted on the charge of bribing Fall, but Doheny's corporation foreclosed on Fall's ranch in Tularosa Basin, New Mexico, because of "unpaid loans" which turned out to be that same bribe. Sinclair was fined and served six months for Contempt of Congress.

After serving time in prison, Fall was in financially reduced circumstances. He and his wife lived in El Paso, Texas, where after a long illness he died on November 30, 1944. He was buried in Evergreen Cemetery in El Paso.

The epithet "fall guy" has been said to derive from his surname, but this phrase was in use well before the scandal.

== See also ==
- Little Green House on K Street

== Bibliography ==
- Recko, Corey. (2007) Murder on the White Sands: The Disappearance of Albert and Henry Fountain University of North Texas Press

U.S. Senate
| New seat | U.S. Senator (Class 2) from New Mexico; 1912–1921; Served alongside: Thomas B. Catron, Andrieus A. Jones | Succeeded by Holm O. Bursum |
Party political offices
| First | Republican nominee for U.S. Senator from New Mexico (Class 2); 1918 | Succeeded by Holm O. Bursum |
Political offices
| Preceded by John Payne | United States Secretary of the Interior; 1921–1923 | Succeeded by Hubert Work |
