= Jesse Wayne Brazel =

American Old West ranch hand

Jesse Wayne Brazel, or Wayne Brazel (December 31, 1876 – after 1913), was an American Old West ranch hand, during the closing years of that era. Brazel's place in history resulted from his 1908 confession and trial for the fatal shooting of former lawman Pat Garrett who, more than a quarter of a century earlier in 1881, had tracked down and killed Henry McCarty, also known as Billy the Kid.

== Circumstances leading to the killing of Pat Garrett ==
Born in Kansas' Greenwood County, Brazel was residing in New Mexico when, on February 29, 1908, he met Garrett on a road near Las Cruces. The two had been involved in prior disputes over Brazel's use of land he leased from Garrett. An argument between Brazel and Garrett resulted in Brazel producing a handgun and shooting Garrett as Garrett was alleged to have reached for a shotgun under his seat on a wagon. This version of what happened was supported by another local resident, Carl Adamson, who was accompanying Garrett when the encounter occurred. The dispute started over Brazel having leased land from Garrett, then grazing goats on it against Garrett's wishes. Brazel and Adamson went to the authorities, where Brazel admitted to the conduct. The specifics of the admission, however, have been described as inconsistent and vague when subjected to detailed scrutiny.

Observers knowledgeable with the matter have speculated that it was difficult to believe that Brazel, who was good natured and who had no prior criminal history, could commit murder. Adamson was a cousin of outlaw and killer-for-hire Jim Miller, which has given rise to conspiracy theories. An alleged meeting attended by several businessmen and outlaws who disliked Garrett was held on an unspecified date in 1907 at the St. Regis Hotel in the Texas city of El Paso, bordering on New Mexico and Mexico. In attendance, along with Brazel, Miller and Adamson, were Oliver Lee, Bill McNew, and W. W. Cox. It has been alleged that a plan to kill Garrett was set at the meeting, but the exact details of that gathering are doubtful.

Garrett had numerous verbal and business disputes with other landowners over watering rights and, with advancing age, his disposition made him a very disliked man. He had been involved in a gunbattle with Lee and another man while working on the Albert Jennings Fountain disappearance case, resulting in one of Garrett's deputies being killed, and the eventual arrest but not conviction of Lee. He was deeply in debt, had a gambling addiction, and was temperamental. In the years following his killing of Billy the Kid, the circumstances surrounding the event came into question, and many believed that instead of acting in the name of the law, he had committed cold blooded murder by ambushing the Kid. Such speculations made him seem no longer as a "dangerous man", but rather an opportunist who sought glory and benefits from that exploit.

== Allegations of a conspiracy ==
W. W. Cox was said to have offered to fund the killing. Miller was to be the man who carried it out. Oliver Lee is alleged to have come up with the plan to have Brazel lease land from Garrett, then graze goats on it, knowing that such use of his property would provoke a violent reaction from Garrett. In light of Garrett's history, it would ultimately lead to a confrontation, in the aftermath of which self-defense could be claimed. Miller was to receive $1,500 for the killing, a typical rate for him, since there was confirmation at the time that had taken the lives of at least seven men in hired killings.

Miller was alleged to have lain in wait for the wagon carrying Adamson and Garrett, with Adamson stopping in a predetermined location, at which time Miller simply walked out and shot him, then returned to Fort Worth. Brazel, with no prior history whatsoever, could easily claim self-defense against Garrett, who had killed at least four men in his lifetime, and was known to always carry the sawed-off shotgun under his seat.

In 2016, a Doña Ana County Clerk’s Office employee came across that document in a box of unarchived materials. Dated February 29, 1908, the handwritten Coroner’s Jury Report – signed by seven jurors – reads as follows: "We the undersigned Justices of the Peace and Coroners Jury have attended the investigation of the body of Pat Garrett who was reported dead within the limits of Precinct No. 20, County of Doña Ana, territory of New Mexico on about five miles northeast of the town of Las Cruces and find that the deceased came to his death by gunshot wounds inflicted by one Wayne Brazel."

However, it was later pointed out by historian Leon Metz that simply because Brazel's story as to how he killed Garrett coincides with the above account, it does not mean he was lying about killing Garrett, or how it happened. Garrett was reportedly a hot-tempered man and was angry with Brazel over the grazing of the goats. Miller was not known to have been in New Mexico at that time, and is believed to have been in Oklahoma. Metz, however, appears not to have known that Garrett was on his way to Las Cruces to meet with Miller.

Another theory is that Adamson was involved in the conspiracy so that he might be able to obtain Garrett's land as a staging area for his illegal smuggling operations in the course of which he imported Chinese men to work in the garment and mining industries, and Chinese women to work as prostitutes. He was arrested shortly after the killing of Garrett for human smuggling, but there is no proof that he was connected in any way with a preconceived murder plot, short of his presence at the above mentioned meeting.

== Remaining years and nephew's role in the Roswell UFO legend ==
Brazel married and acquired a small ranch just west of the nearby small city of Lordsburg a couple of years after the killing. In his late thirties when his wife died in 1913, he sold the property and disappeared from public record. The period and circumstances of his death remain unconfirmed, but word of mouth has indicated that it may have been two years later. A little over thirty years later, in early July 1947, his nephew William "Mac" Brazel gained certain fame in the so-called Roswell UFO incident when he found strange debris on his ranch some 70 miles northwest of Roswell, sparking the claim that a flying saucer crashed on the ranch where Brazel was foreman and that the government subsequently instituted a cover-up.

== Sources ==
- Henning, H. B., ed. (1958). George Curry, 1861–1947, An Autobiography. UNM Press
- Metz, Leon (1973). Pat Garrett, the Story of a Western Lawman. University of Oklahoma Press
- McLoughlin, Denis (1975). Wild and Wooly: An Encyclopedia of the Old West. Barnes & Noble
- Richards, Colin (1986). Sheriff Pat Garrett's Last Days. Sunstone Press, Santa Fe
- Thrapp, Dan L. (1988). Encyclopedia of Frontier Biography. University of Nebraska Press
- Owen, Gordon R. (1996). The Two Alberts, Fountain and Fall. Yucca Tree Press
