= Jim Miller (outlaw) =

American Old West outlaw (1861–1909)

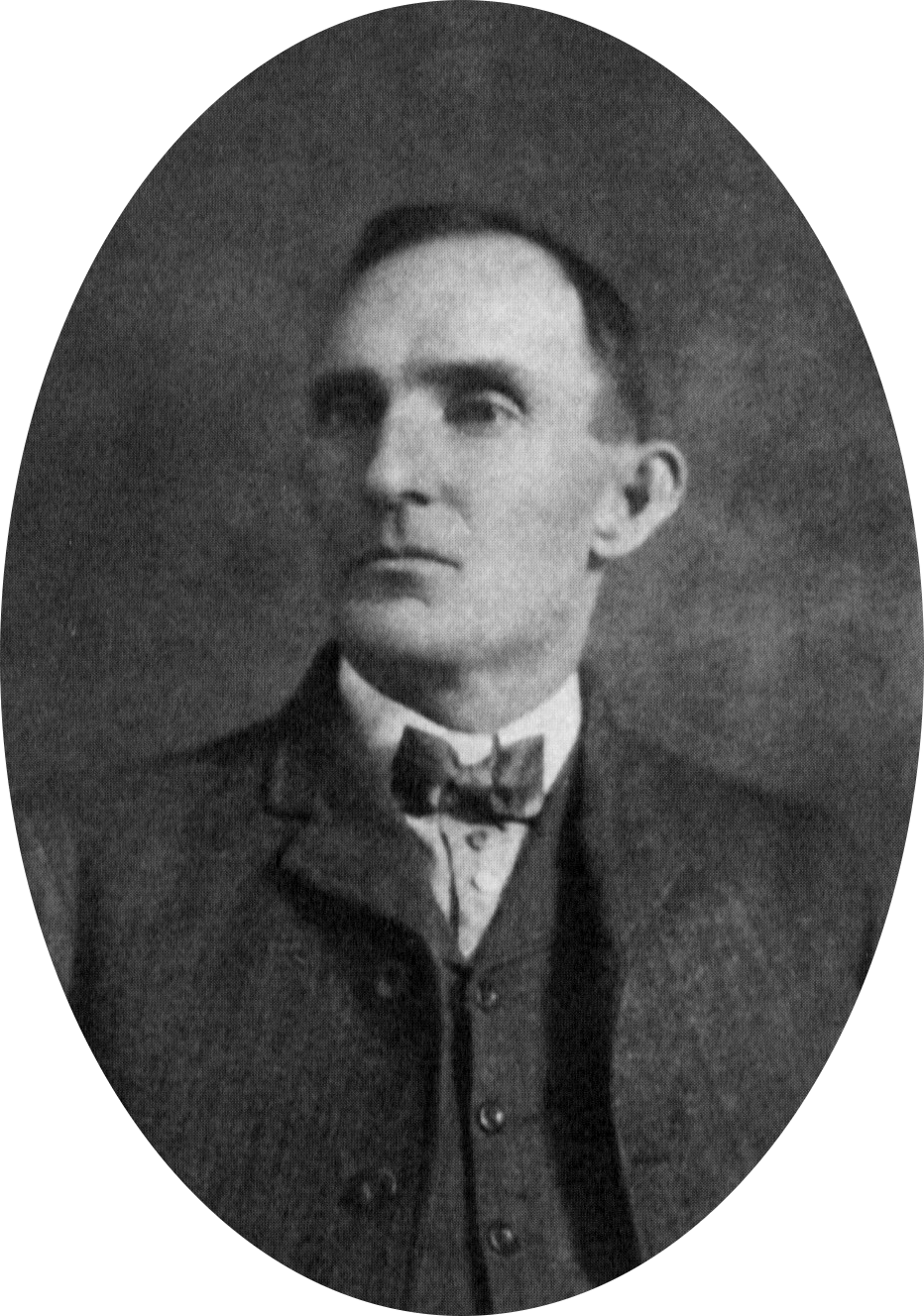
- Portrait photograph, c. 1886
- Born: James Brown Miller; October 25, 1861; Van Buren, Arkansas
- Died: April 19, 1909 (aged 47); Ada, Oklahoma
- Cause of death: Hanged
- Other names: Deacon Jim; Jim "The Killer" Miller; Killer Miller; Killin' Jim Miller
- Occupations: Cowboy lawman saloon keeper assassin
- Years active: 1887-1909
- Spouse: Sallie Clements
- Children: Carrie Brown Miller; Claude B. Miller; Edwin Clement Miller; Mary Wesley Miller

James Brown Miller (October 25, 1861 – April 19, 1909), also known as "Killin' Jim", "Killer Miller" and "Deacon Jim", was an American outlaw and title-holder gunfighter of the American Old West, said to have killed 12 people during gunfights. Miller was referred to by some by the alias "Deacon Jim" because he regularly attended the Methodist Church, and he did not smoke or drink. He was lynched in Ada, Oklahoma, in 1909 along with three other men, by a mob of residents angry that he had assassinated a former deputy U.S. marshal.

== Early life ==
Miller was born in Van Buren, Arkansas, but his parents migrated to Franklin, Texas when he was one year old, and he grew up there. His father Jacob Miller, born in Pennsylvania in 1801, was a stonemason, and helped build the first capitol building in Austin. Miller's mother was born Cynthia Basham. Just a few years after the move, Miller's father died, so his mother took the family to Evant, Texas to live with her parents. In 1869, when Miller was eight, his grandparents were found murdered in their home. Miller was arrested, but never prosecuted for the crime.

His sister, Georgia, and her husband, John Thomas Coop, accepted the boy onto their farm at Plum Creek near Gatesville. The 1880 census records him as being nineteen years old, living in Coryell County, Texas, with his siblings and widowed mother. On July 30, 1884, Miller shot and killed his brother-in-law (with whom he had had an argument) with a shotgun while the latter was sleeping on his porch. Miller was arrested for the murder, convicted, and sentenced to life in prison. The conviction was later overturned on a technicality.

After leaving the Coop farm, Miller became a hired hand on the ranch of Emanuel "Mannen" Clements, a cousin of outlaw John Wesley Hardin, in McCulloch County. Clements was killed by Ballinger City Marshal Joe Townsend on March 29, 1887, during the period when Miller worked at the ranch. Townsend was later ambushed by an assailant wielding a shotgun, which became known as Miller's signature style, and was severely wounded in one arm. Townsend survived but lost his arm to amputation.

== Pecos lawman ==
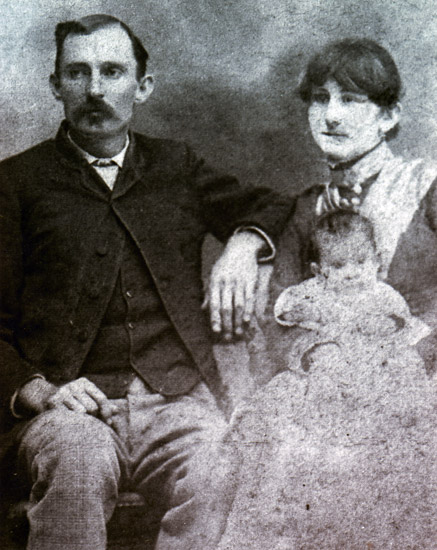
Miller and his family, c. 1895

Over the next couple of years, Miller traveled the Texas–Mexico border region. He later bragged that he had lost his "notch stick on Mexicans that I killed out on the border." He operated a saloon in San Saba County. In Reeves County, Miller became a deputy sheriff and later the town marshal in Pecos. Miller once killed a Mexican prisoner who was "trying to escape." Miller was accused of murdering the man since he knew where he had hidden a pair of stolen mules. Miller was fired after the mules were located.

In 1891 Miller married Sallie Clements, daughter of Mannen Clements. Assuming the appearance of a devout Methodist, he earned the nickname Deacon Jim. He was well-liked by the townspeople because he was polite and an avid member of the church. Regardless of the weather, he was known to wear a long black frock coat.

Miller became involved in a feud with Pecos Sheriff George A. "Bud" Frazer. While Frazer was on a trip to El Paso, he was informed that Miller had allowed criminals to gain greater control over Pecos. Frazer enlisted the help of Texas Ranger John R. Hughes to secure Pecos. After returning to Pecos, Frazer immediately jailed Miller on a charge of murder. A jury acquitted him of this charge. Frazer also believed that Miller had stolen mules and had him arrested for theft.

On April 12, 1894, in Pecos, Miller was confronted by Frazer about his involvement in the murder of cattleman Con Gibson. Frazer reportedly did not wait for Miller to go for his shotgun, and shot and wounded him in the right arm. While Miller was attempting to fire, he discharged his gun with his left hand, hitting bystander Joe Krans. Frazer fired again, hitting Miller in the groin, which finally put him down. Frazer emptied his six-shooter into Miller's chest. After Miller's friends had rushed him to a doctor, his frock coat was removed to reveal a large steel plate that Miller wore under it as a kind of bulletproof vest; it saved his life, and Miller recovered.

On December 26, 1894, Miller was standing outside of a blacksmith's shop when Frazer began to fire at him. Frazer hit Miller in the arm and leg. Rushing in to finish him off, Frazer tried to shoot Miller in the chest, but the metal plate in Miller's coat saved him again. Frazer, demoralized, quickly retreated. Miller had Frazer charged with attempted murder. The case was heard in El Paso, and ended in a hung jury.

Frazer lost his bid for reelection as sheriff and left town for Eddy, New Mexico (now Carlsbad). A few months later, he returned to the Pecos area to visit his mother and sister. Miller learned Frazer was in the area. On September 13, 1896, Frazer was at a gambling table in Toyah, Texas. Miller opened the saloon's swinging doors, leveling his shotgun on one of them. He shot Frazer, who was dealing, and removed most of his head. Frazer's sister later confronted Miller, who threatened to kill her as well. A jury acquitted Miller.

Miller muttered threats toward Joe Earp, a witness who testified against him. Three weeks after Miller's trial, Earp was killed by a shotgun blast. To secure an alibi, Miller spent the night riding his horse on a grueling 100 mi (160 km) journey. The prosecuting district attorney, Judge Stanley, later died of food poisoning in Memphis, Texas.

== Professional assassin ==
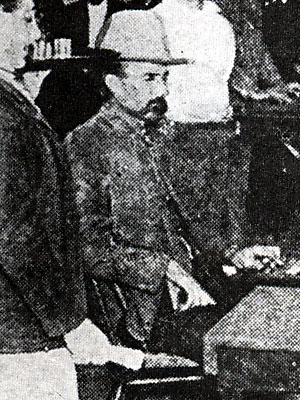
Jim Miller gambling

Despite his legal issues, Miller joined the Texas Rangers, and worked as a resident ranger in Memphis, Texas. Later he served in Hall County. At that time, he killed a man in the neighboring county of Collingsworth in the course of his work.

Miller moved his family to Fort Worth in 1900, where his wife Sallie opened a boarding house, aided by their older children. Here Miller began to advertise as a professional killer, charging $150 for each murder. Miller killed two men near Midland that year and was arrested for the murder of one of them. Miller's partner on the trip, Lawrence Angel, was convinced to take credit for the killing. Acting as a witness, Miller claimed that Angel acted in self-defense.

During the summer of 1902, Miller claimed that he caught three men stealing cattle in Ward County. He killed two of them using his Winchester, and wounded the third, who escaped by managing to cling to his horse and ride away. Miller killed lawyer James Jarrott on August 28, 1902. Jarrott had defended area farmers near Lubbock who were raising fences against cattle; ranchers took them to court, believing that the fences disrupted the grazing of their cattle. Those ranchers hired Miller to murder Jarrott, paying $500. Miller caught Jarrot while watering his horses near his farm. Miller had to shoot Jarrot four times: "He was the hardest damn man to kill I ever tackled."

In 1904, Miller took a contract for the murder of Frank Fore. On March 10, Miller followed his target to the Westbrook hotel, even as Fore was accompanied by three other lawmen: Dee Harkey, Jinx Clark, and Tom Coggins. Miller left the trio in the lobby and shot Fore in a restroom upstairs. Immediately afterward, Miller attempted to surrender to Harkey, but he refused to participate. Clark and Coggins later claimed that they witnessed the shooting and that Miller acted in self-defense. Fore died on March 13.

On August 1, 1906, Miller killed Ben C. Collins, a lawman for the Bureau of Indian Affairs in what was still Indian Territory, which he carried out in front of Collins' home and his wife. It was retribution ordered by a man named Port Pruitt, whom Collins had shot and crippled in 1903 when Pruitt resisted arrest. Pruitt had already hired another gunman for $500, but that gunman took a $200 advance, told Collins of the threat, and left the territory. Miller shot Collins with a load of buckshot. Collins returned six shots, but was hit in the face by Miller and died. Miller was arrested for the murder, but was not convicted and eventually released.

On February 28, 1908, Pat Garrett, ex-lawman and killer of Billy The Kid, was killed near Las Cruces, New Mexico, ostensibly because of a land dispute. Miller was alleged to have committed the murder and to have been paid to do so. Historians believe this is unlikely, as Jesse Wayne Brazel confessed to the crime. Brazel was tried and acquitted on the grounds of self-defense.

== Bobbitt assassination and arrest ==
Miller was contracted by local ranchers Jesse West and Joe Allen, through middleman Berry B. Burrell, for the murder of Allen Augustus "Gus" Bobbitt of Ada, Oklahoma, a cattle rancher and former Deputy U.S. Marshal. The murder was alleged to have been ordered either to acquire his land or because of a personal grudge. The fee was $1,700. On February 27, 1909, Miller chose a place of ambush, concealing himself near Bobbitt's ranch house. Bobbitt and his hired man, Bob Ferguson, arrived from town in their supply wagons. Miller shot Bobbitt in the side with both barrels from his shotgun. Bobbitt tumbled out of the lead wagon, and Miller left the scene on his way to Fort Worth, passing by Ferguson. Bobbitt's wife dashed out to check on her husband. Before dying, Bobbitt confirmed that he had been attacked by Miller. The murder was witnessed by Oscar Peeler, a 19-year-old cowhand who had accepted $50 to lead Miller to Bobbitt. Miller was arrested in Texas by a Texas Ranger and extradited to Oklahoma to stand trial alongside West, Allen, and Burrell.

== Death ==
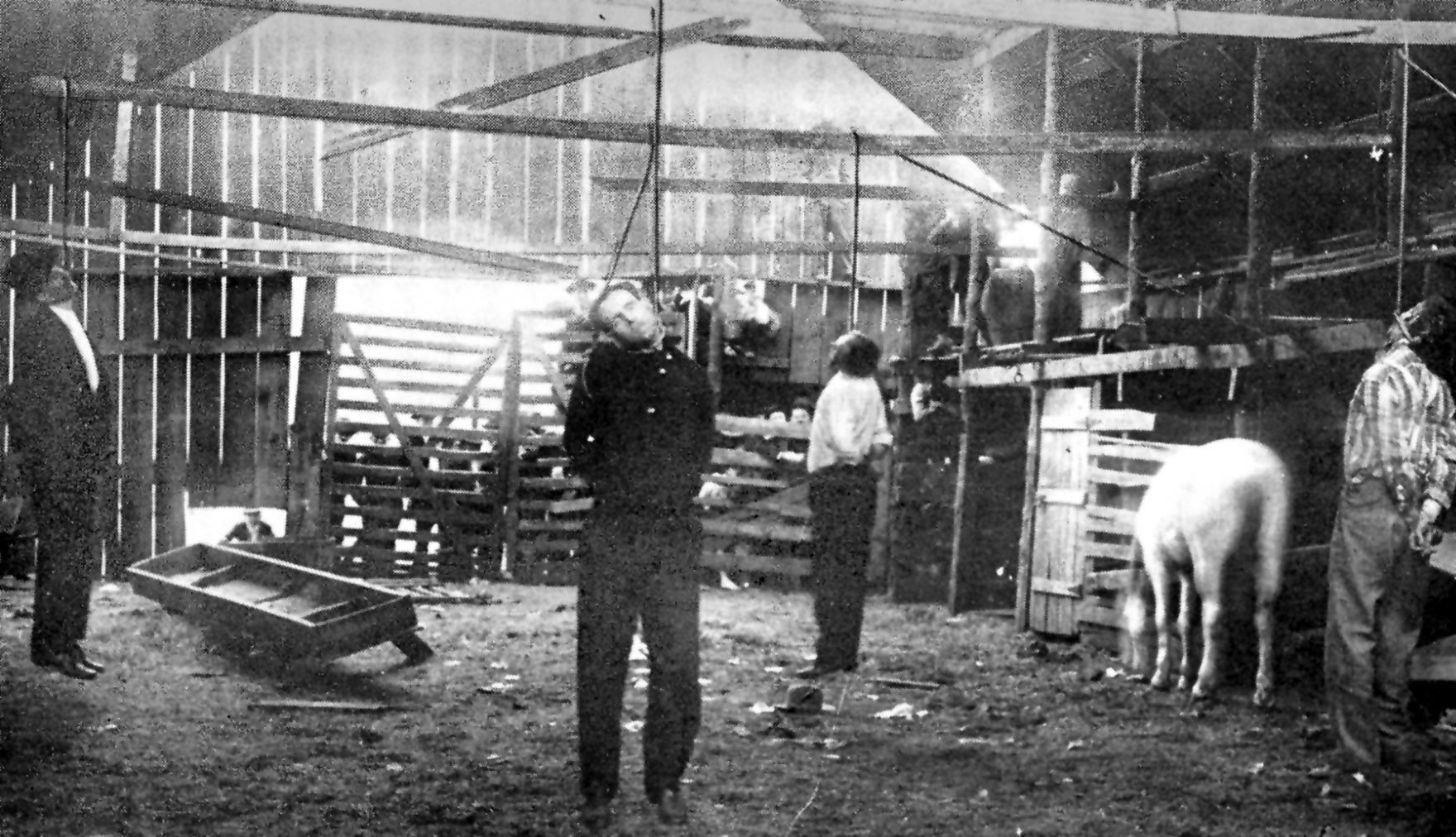
'Killer' Jim Miller, far left, wearing black hat, hangs from a livery stable after being lynched in Ada, Oklahoma, 1909. The others pictured are Allen, Burrell, and West.

Ada residents knew that the evidence against the four suspects was not considered strong, leaving open the chance for acquittal. As such, some decided to take things into their own hands. A lynch mob, reported by The Daily Ardmoreite as numbering 200 and by Associated Press as "...estimated from 30 to 40 in number..." broke into the jail "...between two and three o'clock..." Miller made two final requests: that his diamond ring be given to his wife and that he be permitted to wear his black hat while being hanged. Both requests were granted. He also asked to die in his black frock coat; this request was denied. Newspapers condemned the lynchings, but noted that a week earlier, a man named Stephenson, a suspect in the 1907 murder of Town Marshal Rudolph Cathey, had been acquitted of murder.

== See also ==
- List of Old West gunfighters

== Bibliography and further reading ==
- Correa, Thomas (December 14, 2019). The American Cowboy Chronicles Old West Myths & Legends: The Honest Truth. Page Publishing Inc. ISBN 978-1-64584-285-9.
- Farris, David (July 31, 2011). Oklahoma Outlaws, Spooky Stories and all around folklore. Little Bruce. ISBN 978-0-9646-9224-4.
- James, Bill (1979). Jim Miller, The Untold Story of a Texas Badman. Henington Publishing Company.
- Lanehart, Chuck (May 3, 2021). Tragedy and Triumph on the Texas Plains: Curious Historic Chronicles from Murders to Movies. History Press. ISBN 978-1-4396-7261-7.
- Metz, Leon (2002). The Encyclopedia of Lawmen, Outlaws, and Gunfighters. Infobase. ISBN 978-1-4381-3021-7.
- Nash, Jay (August 22, 1994). Encyclopedia of Western Lawmen & Outlaws. Da Capo Press. ISBN 978-0-3068-0591-2.
- Neal, Bill (July 15, 2017). Death on the Lonely Llano Estacado: The Assassination of J.W. Jarrott, a Forgotten Hero. University of North Texas Press. ISBN 978-1-57441-706-7.
- Patterson, Richard (1985). Historical Atlas of the Outlaw West. Big Earth Publishing. ISBN 978-0-933472-89-1.
- Shirley, Glenn (1980). Shotgun for Hire: The Story of "Deacon" Jim Miller, Killer of Pat Garrett. University of Oklahoma Press. ISBN 978-0-8061-1646-4.
- Thomas, David (October 15, 2019). Killing Pat Garrett, The Wild West's Most Famous Lawman - Murder Or Self-Defense?. Doc45 Publishing. ISBN 978-0-9828709-5-2.
