= Senator Fountain =

Senator Fountain may refer to:

- Albert Jennings Fountain (1838–1896), Texas State Senate
- Lawrence H. Fountain (1913–2002), North Carolina State Senate
