= Roy West =

Roy West may refer to:

- Roy Owen West (1868–1958), Chicago politician and U.S. Secretary of the Interior
- Roy West (footballer) (1941–2011), Australian rules footballer
