= Summers Burkhart =

American lawyer

Summers Burkhart (26 June 1859 – 14 May 1932) was an American lawyer and the United States Attorney for New Mexico from 1913 to 1921.

Burkhart was born in Martinsburg, Virginia (now West Virginia) to middle-class parents, William Davidson Burkhart and Nannie Forest Burkhart. He was sent away for advanced schooling to the College of St. James in Washington County, Maryland, where he graduated in 1879. In 1880 he moved to Santa Fe, New Mexico and began the study of law. He was admitted to the NM bar in 1888, and was the First District Court clerk in 1889. Later that year Burkhart became the Clerk of Court for the NM Supreme Court, where he stayed two years, and left to practice law in Albuquerque, where he had been living since his marriage in May 1889. In 1893 and 1894, Burkhart was the City Attorney for Albuquerque. He left that post to become an assistant U.S. Attorney for the Court of Private Land Claims, where he stayed until 1896, and then returned to the private practice of law.

Burkhart served as an Albuquerque alderman from 1898 through 1900. He was chairman of the Central Committee of the Bernalillo County Democratic Party from 1896 to 1908, and resigned to become the Secretary of the Central Committee of the Democratic Party of New Mexico which post he held until 1911 when he resigned to run for the NM Supreme Court. Burkhart was the NM delegate to the 1908 Democratic National Convention. Defeated for the NM Supreme Court, Governor McDonald appointed Burkhart as Legal Adviser to the Governor. It was in this position that Burkhart issued the legal opinion that Albert Fall's election in February 1913 by the NM Legislature was illegal, forcing a special session and a new vote.

Burkhart was active in securing passage in the U.S. Congress of the "Flood Amendment" to the N.M. Constitution.

Following the election of Woodrow Wilson, Burkhart was appointed as U.S. Attorney for New Mexico. He was confirmed by the United States Senate and sworn in on 5 August 1913. He served until 3 March 1921, when he tendered his resignation upon the inauguration of Republican Warren G. Harding as president.

In 1925, Burkhart represented Governor Hannett against the unsuccessful election challenge of Manuel B. Otero. And the following year represented the State of New Mexico in New Mexico v. Colorado, a large water adjudication.

Burkhart married Miriam Parsons on 8 May 1889 in Las Vegas, New Mexico, and they had two children.
