= Simeon D. Fess =

American politician (1861–1936)

Simeon Fess
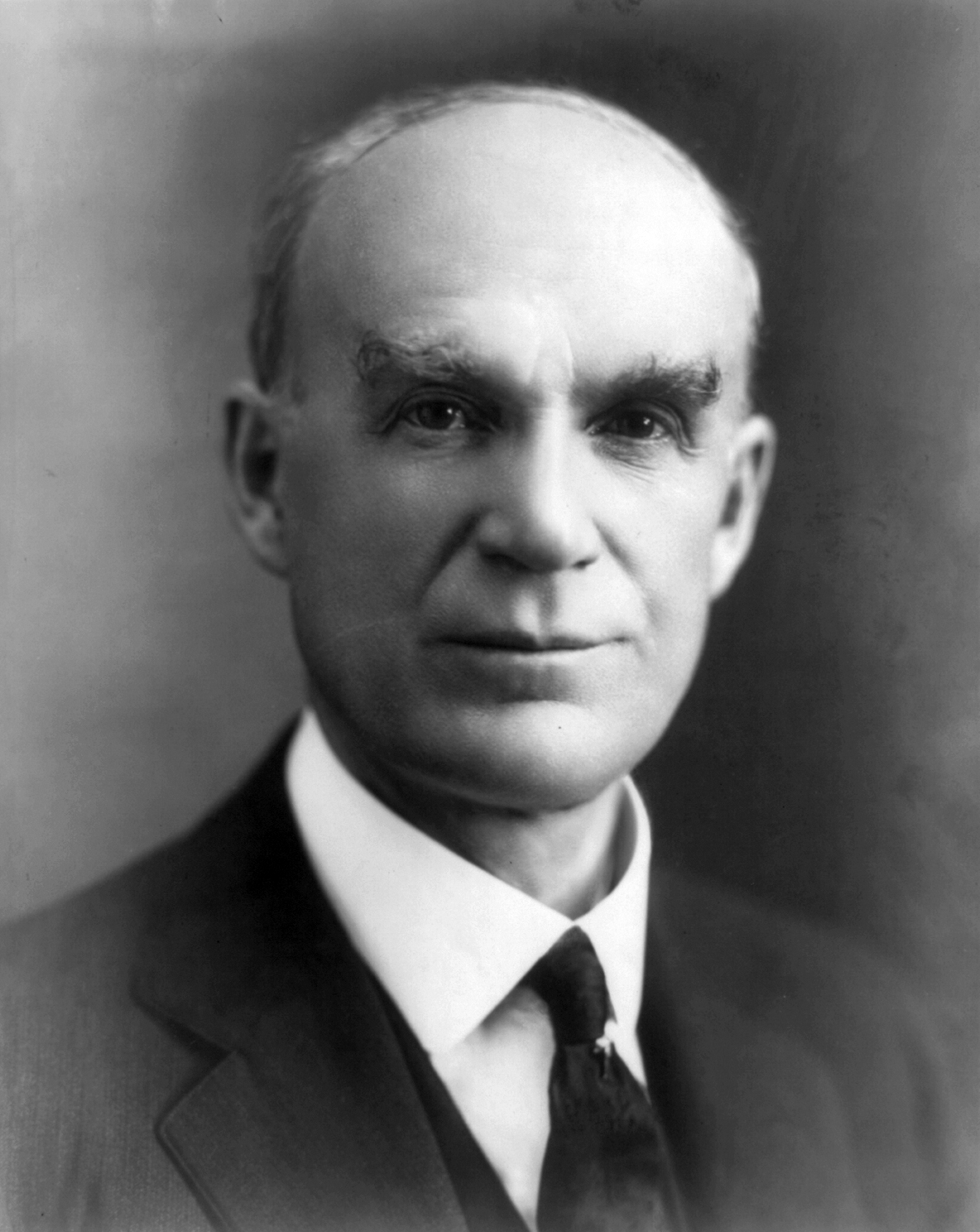
- Fess in 1902

Chair of the Republican National Committee
- In office August 7, 1930 – June 17, 1932
- Preceded by: Claudius H. Huston
- Succeeded by: Everett Sanders

Senate Majority Whip
- In office March 4, 1929 – January 3, 1933
- Leader: James Eli Watson
- Preceded by: Wesley Jones
- Succeeded by: J. Hamilton Lewis

United States Senator from Ohio
- In office March 4, 1923 – January 3, 1935
- Preceded by: Atlee Pomerene
- Succeeded by: A. Victor Donahey

Member of the U.S. House of Representatives from Ohio
- In office March 4, 1913 – March 3, 1923
- Preceded by: Matthew Denver
- Succeeded by: Charles Brand
- Constituency: 6th district (1913-1915); 7th district (1915-1923)

Personal details
- Born: Simeon Davison Fess; December 11, 1861 Harrod, Ohio, U.S.
- Died: December 23, 1936 (aged 75) Washington, D.C., U.S.
- Resting place: Glen Forest Cemetery in Yellow Springs, Ohio
- Party: Republican
- Education: Ohio Northern University (BA, LLB)

Simeon Davison Fess (December 11, 1861 – December 23, 1936) was a Republican politician and educator from Ohio, United States. He served in the United States House of Representatives (1915 to 1923) and U.S. Senate (1923 to 1935).

== Early life ==
Born on a farm near Harrod, Ohio, to Henry and Barbara (Herring) Fess, he was educated in country schools and graduated at Ohio Northern University (ONU) of Ada in 1889 and married Eva C. Thomas the following year. After graduation, he taught history and law at the university as well was working in the university administration from 1889 to 1896. Fess graduated from the law department at ONU in 1894 and served as dean of that department from 1896 to 1900. He then served as vice president of the university from 1900 to 1902. He left for Illinois to become a graduate student and lecturer at the University of Chicago from 1902 to 1907. He then returned to Ohio and served as the president of Antioch College of Yellow Springs from 1907 to 1917.

== Politics ==
In 1912, while still serving at Antioch College, Fess was a delegate to the state constitutional convention.

=== U.S. House of Representatives ===
That same year, he was elected as a Republican to the U.S. House of Representatives, serving from March 4, 1913 – March 3, 1923 (6th district 1913–15, 7th district 1915–23). He served as chairman of the Committee on Education during the Sixty-sixth and Sixty-seventh Congresses, and chairman of the Republican National Congressional Committee from 1918 to 1922.

=== U.S. Senate ===
In 1922, he did not seek re-election, but ran for the U.S. Senate and won, serving from March 4, 1923, to January 3, 1935. He served as chairman of the Committee on the Library during Sixty-ninth through Seventy-second Congresses, and as Republican Whip from 1929 to 1933. He also served as chairman of the Republican National Committee from 1930 to 1932. After his appointment, the Cincinnati Enquirer referred to Fess as a "party wheelhouse and stand patter of the most approved type," and added "It was Senator Fess's proven ability not only to defend, but to eulogize, the acts of Republican administrations, no matter how unpopular they may be, that led to his selection as national chairman." Fess campaigned for the reelection of President Herbert Hoover by claiming Hoover was "the country's greatest peacetime leader," a hard sell in the fall of 1932. That speech, a month before the presidential election, was delivered to just 150 listeners, a sign of the Republican Party's problems in mid-Depression.

He was an unsuccessful candidate for a third term as senator in 1934.

== Retirement and death ==
Fess was a Methodist, an editor, an author and a member of the Freemasons and Knights of Pythias. He died in Washington, D.C. at the age of 75 and was interred at Glen Forest Cemetery in Yellow Springs, Ohio.

U.S. House of Representatives
Preceded by Matthew Denver	Member of the U.S. House of Representatives from Ohio's 6th congressional district 1913–1915	Succeeded by Charles Cyrus Kearns
Preceded by James D. Post	Member of the U.S. House of Representatives from Ohio's 7th congressional district 1915–1923	Succeeded by Charles Brand
Preceded by William J. Sears	Chair of the House Education Committee; 1919–1923	Succeeded by Frederick W. Dallinger
Party political offices
Preceded by Myron T. Herrick	Republican nominee for U.S. Senator from Ohio (Class 1); 1922, 1928, 1934	Succeeded by Harold Hitz Burton
Preceded by Theodore E. Burton	Keynote Speaker of the Republican National Convention; 1928	Succeeded by Lester J. Dickinson
Preceded by Wesley Jones	Senate Republican Whip; 1929–1933	Succeeded by Felix Hebert
Preceded by Claudius H. Huston	Chair of the Republican National Committee; 1930–1932	Succeeded by Everett Sanders
U.S. Senate
Preceded by Atlee Pomerene	U.S. Senator (Class 1) from Ohio; 1923–1935; Served alongside: Frank B. Willis, Cyrus Locher, Theodore E. Burton, Roscoe C. McCulloch, Robert J. Bulkley	Succeeded by A. Victor Donahey
Preceded by Wesley Jones	Senate Majority Whip; 1929–1933	Succeeded by J. Hamilton Lewis
