= Constitution of New Mexico =

American state constitution

Constitution of the State of New Mexico
- The Great Seal of the State of New Mexico

Overview
- Jurisdiction: New Mexico
- Subordinate to: Constitution of the United States
- Created: November 21, 1910
- Ratified: January 21, 1911
- Date effective: January 6, 1912
- System: Single executive

Government structure
- Branches: 3
- Chambers: Two (New Mexico Legislature): New Mexico Senate; New Mexico House of Representatives
- Executive: Governor of New Mexico
- Judiciary: Supreme, Appeals, Trial

The Constitution of the State of New Mexico (Spanish: Constitución del Estado de Nuevo México) is the document that establishes the fundamental political framework of the U.S. state of New Mexico. It sets forth the principles and structure of government, enumerates the rights of citizens, and functions as the supreme law of the state, subordinate only to the United States Constitution.

New Mexico held its first constitutional convention in 1850, two years after being annexed as a territory of the U.S. Over the next sixty years, it produced four constitutions, of which the current document was drafted by the Constitutional Convention of 1910; the resulting draft was adopted by referendum in both English and Spanish, ratified by popular vote on January 21, 1911, and became effective on January 7, 1912 upon admission to the union.

The New Mexico Constitution is unique in the U.S. for recognizing the state's cultural and ethnic diversity; it reaffirms the rights of Hispanos and Spanish speakers under the Treaty of Guadalupe Hidalgo, which granted U.S. citizenship and various legal protections to former Mexican nationals, and prohibits discrimination based on an "inability to speak, read or write the English or Spanish languages."

The New Mexico Constitution has 24 Articles and has been amended more than 170 times; by comparison, the U.S. Constitution has seven Articles and 27 amendments after over 230 years. Amendments may be proposed by a majority vote of each house of the legislature and must then be submitted to the voters of the state for approval. An attempt to adopt a new constitution narrowly failed by referendum in 1969.

As in other states, New Mexicans are granted broader rights than the federal constitution, including more expansive protections to free speech, firearm ownership, and due process, a right to free public school, and freedom from sex-based discrimination.

== History and background ==
From its incorporation into the U.S. in 1848, through 1898, New Mexicans' desire for statehood ebbed and flowed. In the lead up to the Compromise of 1850, statehood was promoted on the grounds that it would stave off Texan encroachment on the eastern section of the territory. In the 1870s, the political and business elites of the Santa Fe Ring championed statehood on the assumption that they would govern any newly admitted states. By the late 1880s, the influx of American "Anglos" brought with it more supporters for New Mexico's admission into the Union; for their part, the Nuevomexicanos—those descended from pre-United States annexation—had long been ambivalent or divided on the question of statehood, typically on the grounds that it would erode their culture and heritage or, in the case of elite families, undermine their long-established social, political, and economic standing.

=== 1910 Constitutional Convention ===
New Mexico held constitutional conventions in 1848, 1849, 1850, 1889–90, 1907, and 1910. The constitutional draft in 1872 was by a territorial legislature. The New Mexico Constitution was drafted by 100 delegates elected by the people of New Mexico; 71 delegates were Republicans, 28 Democrats, and one socialist. They represented a cross section of New Mexican society: Approximately one third were Nuevomexicanos or Hispanos, and the remainder Anglos; though several were wealthy, the majority (as many as two thirds) were middle class. Lawyers reportedly constituted the chief occupational group, at 35 members; the overwhelming majority of representatives had political experience. The delegates formed the sixth and final convention aimed at creating a constitution in advance of admission into statehood.

The convention addressed several longstanding issues that had faced the territory, most notably the enforcement of the Treaty of Guadalupe Hidalgo, which, among other matters, governed the rights, privileges, and immunities of former Mexican citizens living under U.S. administration; this included granting U.S. citizenship unconditionally and protecting religious, linguistic, and cultural heritage. The provisions of the treaty established a paternalistic relationship between the U.S. and its newly adopted citizens, which in turn reflected widespread prejudices against New Mexicans; the territory's large population of Hispanic and indigenous Americans, many of whom did not speak English nor practice Protestantism, were perceived as too "alien" to be inducted into the American republic.

Worried that the conservative federal government would refuse to extend statehood to New Mexico, the Republican-controlled convention framed the constitution to be conservative and noncontroversial. A minority of delegates embraced several social and political reforms of the contemporary Progressive Era, such as prohibitions of convict labor and debtor's prison and guaranteed compensation to railroad workers for injuries suffered due to company negligence. Likewise, the process for amending the constitution through popular consent was designed to safeguard constitutional rights from being removed by future government administrations.

New Mexico Democrats did not agree with many of the contents of the constitution and organized a separate party convention on December 19, 1910, drafting thirteen objections to the constitution draft. The Democrats were primarily concerned with the difficulty of the amendment process, the unequal distribution of the legislature, and the lack of provisions addressing recall votes. However, their objections did not change the final proposed constitution draft that was presented to the electorate for approval.

On January 21, 1911, the constitution was approved by the people with a three-to-one majority; it went into effect when New Mexico was admitted to the Union on January 6, 1912.

== Constitutional Amendments ==
=== Flood Amendment ===
As originally drafted and sent to the United States Congress in 1911, the New Mexico Constitution contained a number of limitations on the process for making amendments, including:

1. Requiring a two-thirds vote of the legislature in order to propose amendments,
2. In addition to a bare majority, all amendments must be ratified by at least 40% of those voting in the election, with a 40%+ vote in at least half of the counties, and
3. Limiting the total number of amendments that could be submitted to the people per election.

Congress was not sympathetic to these anti-populist provisions, and as a prerequisite to admission as a state required that the people ratify an amendment that would provide for a simple majority vote in the legislature, for ratification by simple majority vote of the people, and do away with the limitation on the total number of amendments. This prerequisite came to be known as the "Flood Amendment" as it was proposed by Henry de la Warr Flood, a Democrat from Virginia, at the instigation of Summers Burkhart, secretary of the New Mexico State Central Committee of the Democratic Party. The Flood Amendment did permit two restrictions on the majority ratification, one for amendments to the elective franchise and the other for amendments to the protection of educational access of Spanish speakers or those of Spanish descent.

Between 1912 and 1969, the New Mexico constitution was amended 73 times.

=== Pollution control ===
New Mexico adopted a "pollution-control clause" after voters approved a constitutional amendment in 1971, the same year state lawmakers adopted other environmental protection measures, commensurate with the emergence of the modern environmental movement nationwide. The clause provides that the state legislature "shall provide for control of pollution and control of despoilment of the air, water and other natural resources of this state".

In May 2023, a coalition of environmental groups filed a lawsuit in state district court, marking the first time the state constitution’s pollution-control clause has been the basis of such a legal claim. The plaintiffs argued that the state's failure to control oil and gas pollution amid record output violated state constitutional rights to clean air, land and water.

== 1969 Constitutional Convention ==
In 1967, the legislature decided that a new convention should be called to rewrite the entire constitution. Voters approved of a constitutional convention on November 8, 1968.

The convention occurred in one 60-day session in 1969 and had 70 delegates, one from each of New Mexico’s legislative districts. Of the 70 delegates, 48 were Democrats, 21 Republicans, and one independent. The convention focused on condensing and streamlining the constitution; the final draft reduced the 1910 constitution from 24 articles and 24,000 words to 14 articles and 15,000 words.

However, the voters rejected the new constitution by the narrow margin of 63,387 to 59,685.

== Current Constitution ==
The constitution current has twenty-four articles. The articles each deal with a separate area of governance. The articles are enumerated with Roman numerals but here are listed using Arabic numerals due to technical limitations.

1. Name and Boundaries
2. Bill of Rights
  - New Mexico provides a "bill of rights" modeled after that of the U.S. Constitution, albeit with additional rights, such as to privacy and public education. The New Mexico Bill of Rights also expands upon existing federal rights, such as to gun ownership, freedom of speech, and due process.
3. Distribution of Powers
4. Legislative Department
  - Sets up the legislature branch composed of no more than 42 members of the Senate and 70 members of the House of Representatives. Article V creates the executive branch headed by a governor. The branch consists of a governor, lieutenant governor, secretary of state, state auditor, state treasurer, attorney general and commissioner of public lands.
5. Executive Department
6. Judicial Department
  - Establishes the state judiciary as consisting of a Supreme Court, Court of Appeals, and District Courts; permits other courts to be established. The Supreme Court has five justices popularly elected for eight-year terms.
7. Elective Franchise
8. Taxation and Revenue
9. State, County, and Municipal Indebtedness
10. County and Municipal Corporations
11. Corporations Other than Municipal
12. Education
13. Public Lands
14. Public Institutions
15. Agriculture and Conservation
16. Irrigation and Water Rights
17. Mines and Mining
18. Militia
19. Amendments
20. Miscellaneous
21. Compact with the United States
22. Schedule
23. Intoxicating Liquors
24. Leases on State Land
