= X to Y =

- Directed by: Matt Sobel
- Written by: Matt Sobel
- Produced by: Matt Sobel; David Sobel
- Starring: Brett Lee Alexander; Madison Nicole Alexander; Shivani Kadakia; Tony Panighetti
- Cinematography: Christina Carrea
- Edited by: Matt Sobel
- Release date: February 27, 2009
- Running time: 24 minutes
- Country: United States
- Language: English

X to Y is a 2009 short film written and directed by Matt Sobel and starring Brett Lee Alexander, Madison Nicole Alexander, Shivani Kadakia, and Tony Panighetti. It was shot on location in White Sands, New Mexico.

== Cast ==
- Brett Lee Alexander as Toby
- Madison Nicole Alexander as Skittle
- Shivani Ray as Priya
- Tony Panighetti as Neil

== Awards ==
The film's festival debut was at Cinequest Film Festival 19 on March 6, 2009, where it won the Audience Award for best short film.
