= Claudius H. Huston =

American politician (1876–1952)

Claudius Huston
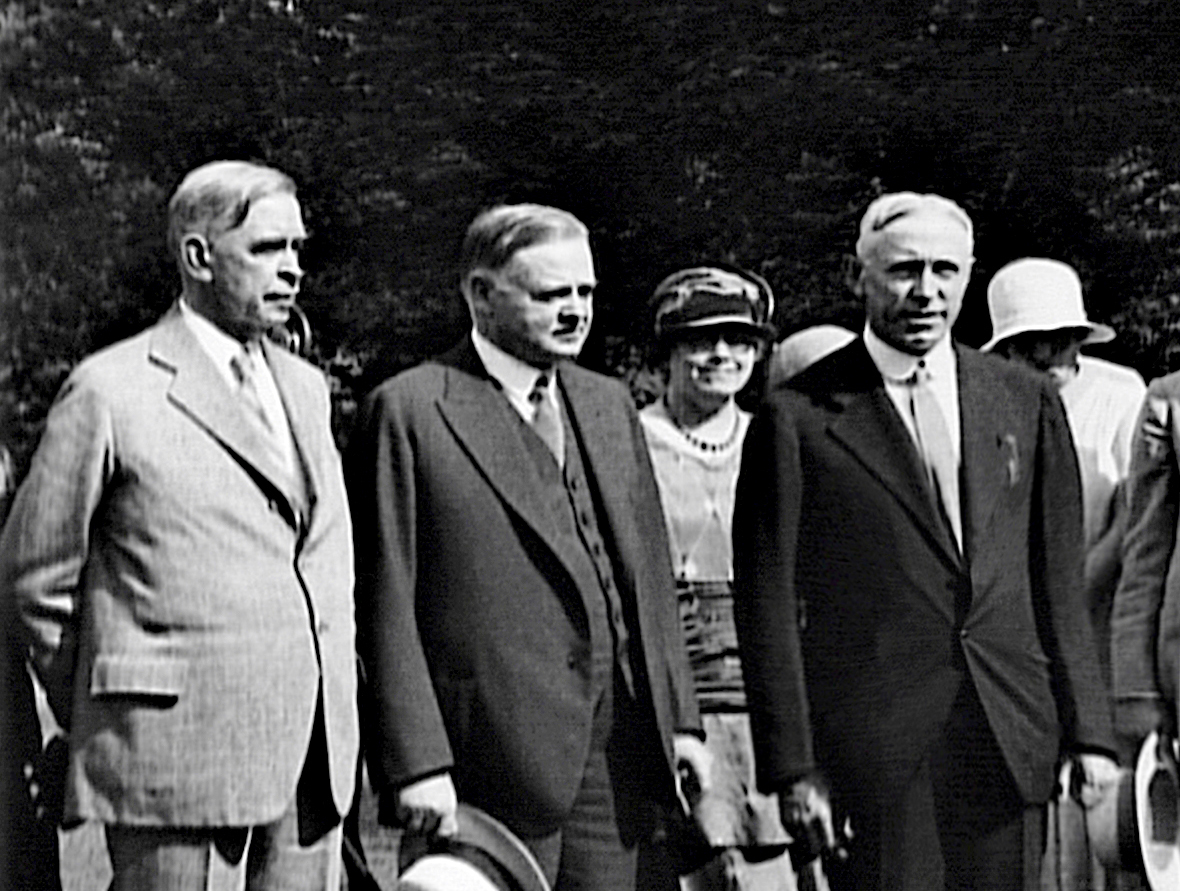
- Huston (right) with Hubert Work (left) and Herbert Hoover (center)

Chair of the Republican National Committee
- In office September 9, 1929 – August 7, 1930
- Preceded by: Hubert Work
- Succeeded by: Simeon D. Fess

Personal details
- Born: Claudius Hart Huston; February 15, 1876 Boone Township, Indiana, U.S.
- Died: August 14, 1952 (aged 76) Stamford, Connecticut, U.S.
- Party: Republican
- Education: Valparaiso University; University of Tennessee, Chattanooga (BS)

Claudius Hart Huston (February 15, 1876 – August 14, 1952) was a prominent industrialist and politician from the U.S. state of Tennessee, he became a leader in the development of the Tennessee River.

Huston was born in Boone Township, Harrison Country, Indiana. He attended a rural one-room schoolhouse and Valparaiso University. He earned his tuition with a $30 a month teaching post and by working as a farm hand. In 1897 he arrived in Chattanooga in a freight car as custodian of a cousin's cattle and horses. Shortly afterwards, he moved and made his home in Chattanooga, Tennessee, where he later obtained his B.S. degree from University of Chattanooga.

He made his first business venture in 1900 as a manufacturer of saw mill machinery and subsequently became a factor in furniture manufacturing, textile plants and stamped steel ware. He became associated with various lobbying houses in Tennessee and Alabama.

In 1920, Huston, a Republican, was the chairman of the Republican Ways and Means Committee for Tennessee and later chairman of the Finance and Advisory Committee of the Republican State Committee when Tennessee broke "the solid South" by casting, for the first time, a majority of votes for Warren G. Harding, then Republican candidate for president in 1920.

In 1921, President Harding appointed Huston to position of Assistant U.S. Secretary of Commerce to Secretary Herbert Hoover. They became good friends before Huston left that position in 1923 to return to private business when he began the reorganization of the Transcontinental Oil Company in New York. Later Huston played a key role in the presidential nomination of Herbert Hoover at the Kansas City Republican National Convention in 1928. Huston had a reputation as a dexterous campaign fund raiser for the Republican National Committee and was President Hoover's personal choice to succeed Hubert Work as RNC Chairman in 1930, but only after Senate Republicans also expressed their satisfaction with Huston. A prominent political and business leader from Tennessee, Huston was expected to take advantage of Hoover's strong support in the southern presidential electorate in 1928 to reorganize and build the party organization there.

During his life, Huston was president of Transcontinental Oil Co., the Tennessee River Navigation Co.; Chattanooga Manufacturing Association, Chattanooga Chamber of Commerce, Lee Highway Association, and three wholesale jobbing houses in Tennessee. He served as president of the Dixie Highway Association and chair of the executive committee of the University of Chattanooga; official in ironworking, woodworking and textile industries of Tennessee. He was Director of Chattanooga Trust Co (Vice President), First National Bank, First Trust and Saving Bank (all of Chattanooga) and Chairman of executive committee of University of Chattanooga and for many years was adviser for the financial interests of the Brotherhood of Locomotive Engineers. He was a member of Masonic Order (all orders including 33rd degree honorary Scottish Rite Mason),

Huston also headed the Tennessee River Improvement Association, which maintained a Washington D.C. lobby to oppose government operation of a $150,000,000 power plant, built during World War I to make nitrates for gunpowder. The association favored acceptance of some private bid for the plant's use and Huston sent more than $156,000 to his office in Washington D.C. within a four-year period. In 1928, he greatly helped write the Muscle Shoals plank in bipartisan platforms. His association lobbied for the Muscle Shoals bid of the American Cyanamid Co., under which Union Carbide Co. would get a share of surplus Muscle Shoals power.

In 1930, Mr. Huston became involved in the Senate Lobby Committee's investigation of various influences to obtain possession of the government's Muscle Shoals power and fertilizer project. It was testified that the Tennessee River Improvement Association of which Mr. Huston had been president was one of the organizations that had been exerting pressure. As a result of the inquiry, Mr. Huston resigned as Republican National Committee Chairman August 7, 1930.

His daughter Alice married Fulton Lewis, a conservative national radio broadcaster from Washington, D.C.

Party political offices
Preceded by Hubert Work	Chair of the Republican National Committee; 1929–1930	Succeeded by Simeon D. Fess
