= Hubert Work =

American politician and physician (1860–1942)

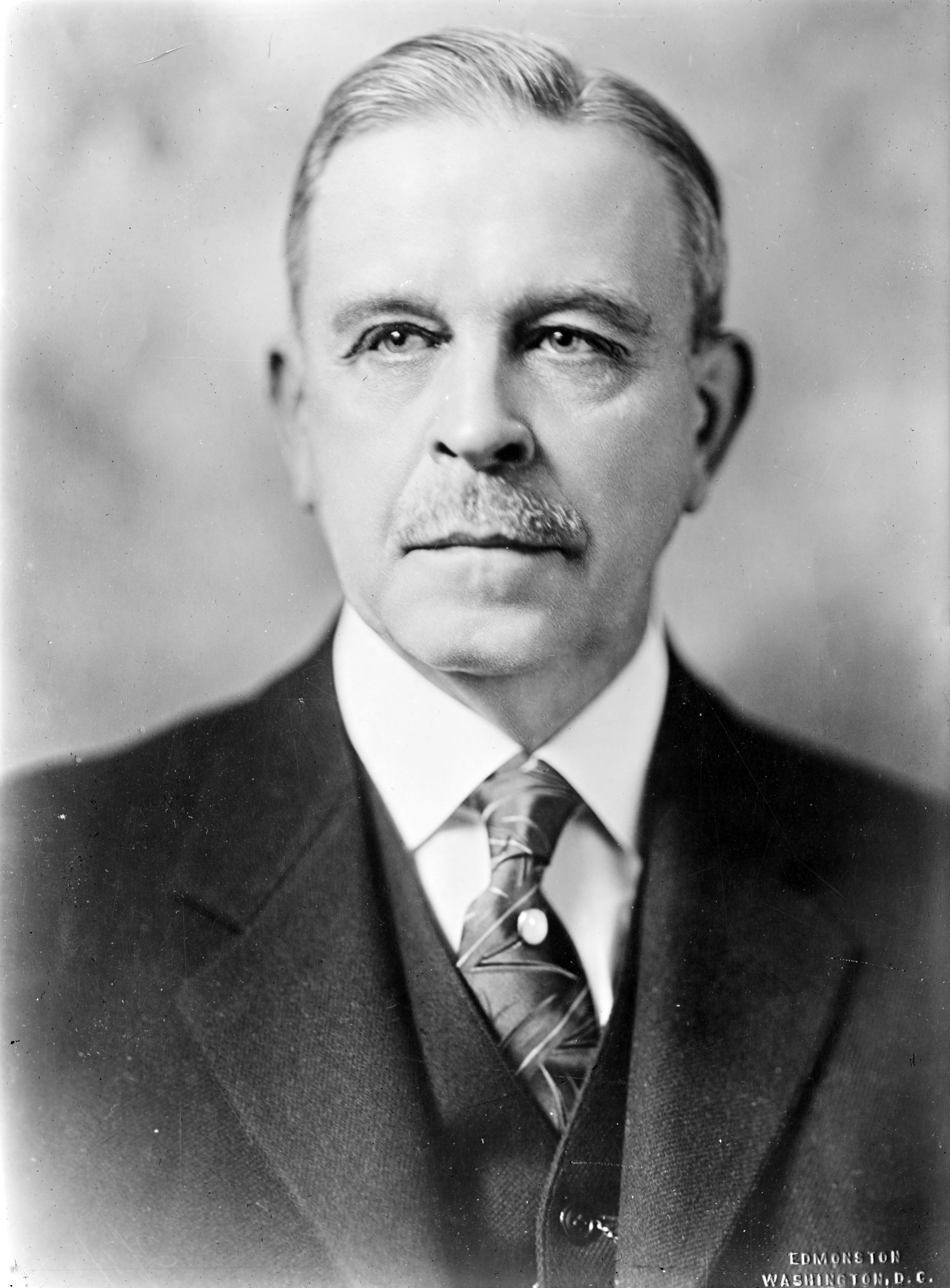
- Work, c. 1920–1925

Chair of the Republican National Committee
- In office July 24, 1928 – September 9, 1929
- Preceded by: William M. Butler
- Succeeded by: Claudius H. Huston

29th United States Secretary of the Interior
- In office March 4, 1923 – July 24, 1928
- President: Warren G. Harding; Calvin Coolidge
- Preceded by: Albert B. Fall
- Succeeded by: Roy Owen West

47th United States Postmaster General
- In office March 4, 1922 – March 4, 1923
- President: Warren G. Harding
- Preceded by: Will H. Hays
- Succeeded by: Harry Stewart New

Personal details
- Born: July 3, 1860 Marion Center, Pennsylvania, U.S.
- Died: December 14, 1942 (aged 82) Denver, Colorado, U.S.
- Resting place: Arlington National Cemetery
- Party: Republican
- Education: Indiana University of Pennsylvania (BA); University of Michigan; University of Pennsylvania (MD)

Military service
- Allegiance: United States
- Branch/service: United States Army
- Years of service: 1917–1919
- Rank: Lieutenant Colonel
- Unit: United States Army Medical Corps
- Battles/wars: World War I

Hubert Work (July 3, 1860 – December 14, 1942) was an American politician and physician. He served as the United States postmaster general from 1922 until 1923 during the presidency of Warren G. Harding. He served as the United States secretary of the interior from 1923 until 1928 during the administrations of Warren G. Harding and Calvin Coolidge.

== Early life and career ==
Work was born in Marion Center, Pennsylvania, to Tabitha Van Horn and Moses Thompson Work. He attended medical school at the University of Michigan from 1882 to 1883 and received an M.D. from the University of Pennsylvania in 1885. He settled in Colorado and founded Woodcroft Hospital in Pueblo, Colorado, in 1896.

Work was active in the Republican Party and served as the Colorado state chairman in 1912. In 1914, Work ran unsuccessfully in a special election for the United States Senate. He was defeated by Democrat Charles S. Thomas, later the governor of Colorado.

Work received 98,728 votes (39 percent) compared to Thomas' 102,037 ballots (40.3 percent). This was Colorado's first Senate election by popular vote under the Seventeenth Amendment to the United States Constitution. During World War I, Work served in the U.S. Army Medical Corps and attained the rank of lieutenant colonel.

From 1921 to 1922, Work served as the president of the American Medical Association. He was the Colorado delegate to the Republican National Convention in 1920 and was chairman of the Republican National Committee from 1928 to 1929.

Work served as the U.S. assistant postmaster general from 1921 to 1922, and as the U.S. postmaster general from 1922 to 1923 under President Harding. He served as the U.S. secretary of the interior from 1923 to 1928, under the administrations of President Warren G. Harding and Calvin Coolidge. During Work's tenure as the secretary of the interior, American citizenship was formally granted to the Native Americans in the United States. He resigned from the Department of the Interior on July 24, 1928, and was replaced by Roy O. West. He was the first physician to serve in the U.S. Cabinet.

== Personal life ==
In 1887, Work married Laura M. Arbuckle, with whom he had three children: Philip, Dorcas "Doris" Logan, and Robert Van Horn Work. Work's first wife died and he married the former Ethel Reed Gano in 1933.

Work died in Denver, Colorado, on December 14, 1942. He was buried in Arlington National Cemetery in Arlington, Virginia, next to his first wife.

Party political offices
First	Republican nominee for U.S. Senator from Colorado (Class 3); 1914	Succeeded by Samuel D. Nicholson
Preceded by William M. Butler	Chair of the Republican National Committee; 1928–1929	Succeeded by Claudius H. Huston
Political offices
Preceded by Will H. Hays	United States Postmaster General; 1922–1923	Succeeded by Harry New
Preceded by Albert B. Fall	United States Secretary of the Interior; 1923–1928	Succeeded by Roy West
