= Leon Claire Metz =

American journalist

- Born: November 6, 1930; Parkersburg, West Virginia, U.S.
- Died: November 15, 2020 (aged 90); El Paso, Texas, U.S.
- Occupations: cultural historian. author, columnist, television personality
- Years active: 1958–2020
- Spouse: Cheryl Schilling
- Children: 4
- Awards: Saddleman Award (1985)

Leon Claire Metz (November 6, 1930 – November 15, 2020) was an American cultural historian, author, television documentary personality, and lecturer on the American Old West period. He presented hundreds of his programs to groups all over the U.S. particularly in Texas, New Mexico, Arizona. Metz also made numerous TV appearances television documentaries most notably, A&E's The Real West series, which is also shown on The History Channel.

== Early life and career ==
Metz was born in Parkersburg, West Virginia, and graduated from Parkersburg High School in 1948. He then joined the US Air Force during the Korean War. He was primarily stationed at Biggs Army Airfield in El Paso, where he was a propeller mechanic, attaining the rank of staff sergeant, which he would later portray in his book Fort Bliss: An Illustrated History. C.L. "Doc" Sonnichsen a noted historian himself, would serve as an early mentor for the young Metz.

=== Literary and other works ===
Metz wrote 17 books. His 17 books include: Turning Points in El Paso, Texas, 400 Years of El Paso, El Paso Chronicles, City at the Pass, El Paso Guided Through the Times, Roadside History of Texas, Fort Bliss, Southern New Mexico Empire, John Westly Hardin, Pat Garrett The Story of a Western Lawman, John Selman, Texas Gunman, Dallas Stoudenmyer, The Shooters, Border, Desert Army, Robert McKee Master Builder, and The Encyclopedia of Lawmen, Outlaws, and Gunfighters. , most notably John Selman: Texas Gunfighter and a biography of Old West lawman Pat Garrett. Metz also hosted a weekly column in the El Paso Times and hosted a radio show, The Leon Metz Show on KTSM, which related to Southwestern U.S. history. He was often seen on BBC television specials about the west. On June 16, 2012, Metz contributed his voice to an alternative hip hop album entitled Greetings from El Paso, a concept album about El Paso, Texas by local rapper Zyme One.

In 1991, Metz, together with researcher Sylvia Gevália Landeros, created Travel the Pass, a partnership dedicated to exploring and documenting the borderland history of the Texas, New Mexico, and Mexico region. In October 2024, the City of El Paso, Texas, issued a proclamation honoring Metz's numerous works, contributions, and accomplishments; October 22, 2024, is recognized as Leon Metz Travel The Pass Day.

== Awards ==
He was the 2010 Winner of the Ruth Lester Lifetime Achievement Award from the Texas Historical Commission. This award recognizes an individual who has made a significant, long-term contribution to historic preservation in Texas.

In 1985, he was awarded the Saddleman Award.

== Personal life and death ==
Metz, who lived in El Paso, Texas, since the days after his graduation from high school, was married to the former Cheryl Schilling, a speech therapist for autistic children. They have four adult children.

Leon Metz died from complications of COVID-19 in El Paso, on November 15, 2020. He had Alzheimer's disease.
