= Albert Jennings Fountain =

American politician

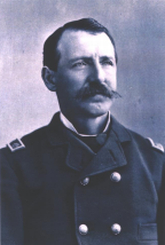

Ex officio Lieutenant Governor of Texas
- In office 1871–1873
- Governor: Edmund J. Davis
- Preceded by: David Webster Flanagan (Ex officio)
- Succeeded by: Edward B. Pickett (Ex officio)

President pro tempore of the Texas Senate
- In office March 30, 1871 – May 31, 1871
- Preceded by: David Webster Flanagan
- Succeeded by: David Webster Flanagan

Member of the Texas Senate from the 30th district
- In office February 8, 1870 – January 13, 1874
- Preceded by: William B. Knox
- Succeeded by: William H. Russell

Personal details
- Born: October 23, 1838 Staten Island, New York, U.S.
- Party: Republican
- Spouse: Mariana Perez
- Children: 6
- Profession: Journalist, politician, attorney, prosecutor

Military service
- Branch/service: Union Army (California Column); 1st Regiment New Mexico Volunteer Cavalry
- Years of service: 1861–1864; 1864–1865
- Rank: Second Lieutenant (Union); Brevet Captain (Volunteers)
- Battles/wars: American Civil War; American Indian Wars
- Disappeared: February 1, 1896 (aged 57); Las Cruces, New Mexico, U.S.

Colonel Albert Jennings Fountain (October 23, 1838 – disappeared February 1, 1896) was an American attorney who served in the Texas Senate and the New Mexico House of Representatives. Following a purge of corruption among cattle rustlers that Fountain investigated and prosecuted, his eight-year-old son Henry and he disappeared near White Sands, New Mexico Territory. Their bloodstained wagon and other evidence of an ambush were recovered, but the bodies were never found. Suspicion centered on two rival landowners, Oliver M. Lee and Albert B. Fall. Lee and two employees were tried for the murder of Henry Fountain, but acquitted after a defense by Fall. No charges were ever filed for the death of Albert Fountain.

== Biography ==
Albert Fountain was born on Staten Island, New York, on October 23, 1838, to Solomon Jennings and his wife Catherine de la Fontaine. He went to California as a young man and began calling himself by an Anglicised version of his mother's family name. (Accounts differ as to why he did so.) Fountain studied law in California and was admitted to the bar in 1860. Working as a reporter for The Sacramento Union, he travelled to Nicaragua in 1860 to cover the filibustering expedition of William Walker. Angering Walker by his reports, Fountain was arrested and sentenced to be shot, but he escaped and returned to California.

In August 1861, during the American Civil War, Fountain enlisted in the Company E of the 1st California Infantry Regiment of the Union Army and was elected first sergeant of his company. He took part in the 1862 recapture of the New Mexico Territory as a member of the California Column. In October 1862, he married Mariana Pérez of Mesilla. They became the parents of four sons and two daughters. Later commissioned a second lieutenant, he was discharged on August 31, 1864. Fountain almost immediately joined the New Mexico volunteers because of the ongoing Indian Wars. In June 1865, he was seriously wounded while pursuing hostile Apaches. He spent a night trapped under his dead horse, with a bullet in his thigh, an arrow in his forearm, and another arrow in his shoulder. On his recovery, Fountain was discharged as a brevet captain.

Fountain settled in El Paso, Texas, working for the United States Property Commission, which investigated and disposed of former Confederate property. He was then made the customs collector for the El Paso region. Fountain was next appointed an election judge, and finally became the assessor and collector of internal revenue for the Western District of Texas. In 1870, Fountain became a co-founder of the Church of St. Clement, the first Protestant church in El Paso.

In 1869, Fountain won a seat as a Republican in the Texas Senate, serving in the 12th and 13th Texas Legislatures. He was elected as president pro tempore during the second session of the 12th Legislature and served as lieutenant governor ex officio at the same time, as the office was vacant. Fountain's most notable accomplishment was pushing through the bill that re-established the Texas Rangers, which had been abolished after the Civil War. Fountain's Radical Republican views angered Texas Democrats, and he was challenged to several duels, resulting in his killing of at least one man, Frank Williams.

In 1873, Fountain moved from El Paso to Mesilla with his wife and their five children. There, he again practiced law, using his fluent Spanish to good advantage in jury trials. Fountain was appointed assistant district attorney and also served as probate judge and a deputy court clerk. In 1877, he founded a newspaper, the Mesilla Valley Independent, which was issued in both English and Spanish. He also founded the Mesilla Dramatic Society and the Mesilla Valley Opera House, now the Fountain Theater, both originally operated by his family.

In his law practice in Mesilla, Fountain's most famous client was Billy the Kid. Fountain lost the 1881 case, and Billy the Kid was convicted of murder despite the evidence, though he escaped from jail. In 1888, Fountain was elected to the New Mexico Territorial Legislature, defeating his enemy Albert Bacon Fall. At the time of Fountain's disappearance, he was investigating and prosecuting suspected cattle rustlers, specifically Oliver M. Lee, and he again found himself at odds with Fall, who was Lee's attorney.

== Disappearance and probable murder ==
On February 1, 1896, Fountain and his eight-year-old son Henry disappeared near White Sands on the way to their home in Mesilla. They were returning from Lincoln, where Fountain had been assisting the prosecution in bringing charges against Lee and William McNew. All that was found at the site of the disappearance were Fountain's buckboard wagon, several empty cartridge cases, his cravat and papers, and two pools of blood. The only sign of Henry was a blood-soaked handkerchief with two powder-blackened coins, the handkerchief still carefully knotted in one corner. Missing were the victims' bodies, a blanket, a quilt, and Fountain's Winchester rifle.

Some speculated that outlaw Tom "Black Jack" Ketchum and his gang were involved. Most, however, were convinced the disappearances could be attributed to Lee, a noted rancher, land developer, and a part-time Deputy U.S. marshal. Lee's employees McNew and Jim Gililland were also suspected of involvement. Lee and Gililland were pursued by lawman Pat Garrett and a posse, who engaged them in a gunfight near Alamogordo. After Deputy Sheriff Kent Kearney was mortally wounded July 12, 1898, though, Garrett and his posse withdrew. Lee and Gililland later negotiated their surrender to others. They were defended by Fall, and were acquitted due to a lack of evidence.

Fountain was a powerful rival to land owners Fall and Lee. Fall was also known to hate Fountain as a political rival, just as Fountain hated Fall. Fall's association with Lee began when he had defended Lee in a criminal case. Fountain had repeatedly challenged Fall and his men in the courts and the political arena.

As the bodies of Fountain and his son were never found, the prosecution was greatly hampered. No one was ever charged with the murder of Albert Fountain. Lee and his employees, McNew and Gililland, were tried for the murder of Henry Fountain. Charges also were never filed for the death of Deputy Sheriff Kearney. The charges against McNew were dismissed, while Lee and Gililland were both acquitted.

Memorials to both Albert Jennings Fountain and his son are in the Masonic Cemetery in Las Cruces, though their actual burial site remains a mystery.

== The Fountain family in Las Cruces ==
Fountain was a Freemason, and held membership at Aztec Lodge No. 3 in Las Cruces, where he served as Worshipful Master of the lodge several times. On February 8, 1896, one week after his son Henry and his disappearance, Aztec Lodge drafted a charter offering a total reward of $700 (in 1896) for returning the bodies of Fountain and Henry to the lodge, and for the arrest and conviction of the parties concerned in the abduction and supposed murder of Fountain and his son. The reward offered by the charter is still valid to this day.

The Fountain family ran the Mesilla Valley Opera House and built the Fountain Theatre in Old Mesilla near Las Cruces. The theater was rebuilt in 1905 for stage plays and musical concerts, and is the oldest motion picture theater in New Mexico. It is currently operated by the Mesilla Valley Film Society. The interior decoration includes murals of Albert Fountain painted by his son, Albert, Jr.

== In popular media ==
Fountain's disappearance was dramatized in the 2013 film Among the Dust of Thieves.

A fictionalized version of the events surrounding Fountain's disappearance is depicted in the novel Hard Country by Michael McGarrity.

Fountain's disappearance and death are discussed by characters John Grady Cole and Mr. Johnson in the 1998 novel Cities of the Plain by Cormac McCarthy, the third and final volume in The Border Trilogy.

Mary Armstrong's historical fiction series '' includes a fictional nephew. The dramatic ten years leading to the Fountains' disappearance is the backdrop for the fictional nephew's coming of age story. The books are available on Amazon and at bookstores in the Las Cruces, NM area.

== See also ==
- List of people who disappeared mysteriously (pre-1910)
- San Elizario Salt War
- Texas Senate
- Thomas B. Catron

Texas Senate
Preceded by William B. Knox	Texas State Senator from District 30 (El Paso); 1870–1874	Succeeded by William H. Russell
Political offices
Preceded by David Webster Flanagan	President pro tempore of the Texas Senate; 1871	Succeeded by David Webster Flanagan
Preceded by David Webster Flanagan	Lieutenant Governor of Texas; 1871–1873	Succeeded by Edward B. Pickett (Ex officio); Richard B. Hubbard
