= Roy Owen West =

American politician

Roy West
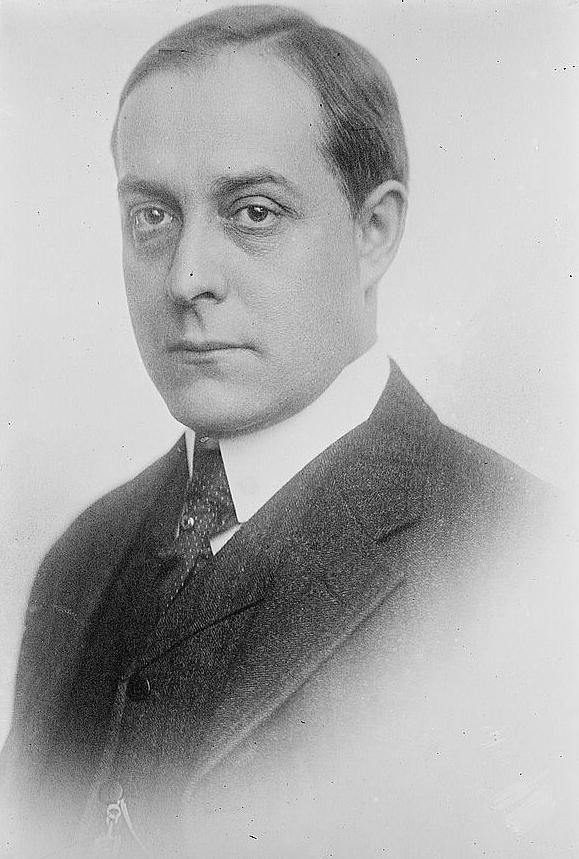

30th United States Secretary of the Interior
- In office July 25, 1928 – March 4, 1929
- President: Calvin Coolidge
- Preceded by: Hubert Work
- Succeeded by: Ray Lyman Wilbur

Personal details
- Born: Ray Owen West; October 27, 1868 Georgetown, Illinois, U.S.
- Died: November 29, 1958 (aged 90) Chicago, Illinois, U.S.
- Resting place: Rosehill Cemetery
- Party: Republican
- Spouse: Louise McWilliams
- Children: 2
- Education: DePauw University (BA)

Roy Owen West (October 27, 1868 – November 29, 1958) was a Chicago politician who served as U.S. Secretary of the Interior from 1928 until 1929 in President Calvin Coolidge's cabinet.

== Biography ==
West was born in Georgetown, Illinois, on October 27, 1868, the son of Helen Anna Yapp and Pleasant West. He graduated from DePauw University and was the admitted to the Illinois bar in 1890. West served as assistant attorney for Cook County, Illinois and then as city attorney for Chicago. In 1898, West was elected to the Cook County Board of Review.

West formed a close political alliance with future Governor of Illinois Charles S. Deneen. West served as the Secretary to the GOP National Committee from 1924 until 1928. President Coolidge appointed West United States Secretary of the Interior from 1928 until before Hoover's inauguration in 1929, but after his cabinet service, West returned to Illinois. He was a member of the National Methodist Board of Education from 1936 to 1940. During World War II, West worked as a federal hearing officer for conscientious objector cases.

He died in Chicago, Illinois, and was buried in Rosehill Cemetery there. The Roy O. West Library at DePauw University was named for him.

Political offices
Preceded by Hubert Work	U.S. Secretary of the Interior; Served under: Calvin Coolidge; July 25, 1928 – March 4, 1929	Succeeded by Ray Lyman Wilbur
