= Oliver Lee (New Mexico gunfighter) =

American politician

Oliver Milton Lee, commonly known as Oliver Lee (8 November 1865 – 15 December 1941) was a part-time deputy U.S. marshal, rancher, and gunfighter. Lee was born in Buffalo Gap, Texas and died in Alamogordo, New Mexico, where the Oliver Lee Memorial State Park is named for him.

== Early life ==
Little is known about Lee's life prior to his moving to New Mexico from Texas with his mother. His marksmanship even at an early age is mentioned in "The Fabulous Frontier" (ISBN 0-8263-0621-7). Lee worked as a Deputy US Marshal before turning to ranching. He was described in "Tularosa: Last of the Frontier West" (ISBN 978-0826305619) as "magnificently muscled, straight as a young pine, catlike in his coordination". "He had his mother's piercing black eyes which seemed to bore into you, and a chin like the rock of Gibraltar, but he always spoke softly." (A description of him at the age of 19.)

"Oliver Lee would turn a man off quicker for abusing a horse than for any other reason." (Sonnichsen)

"Dee Harkey in his "The Life of a New Mexico Lawman - Mean as Hell" (ISBN 0-941270-60-2) stated he had many dealings with Oliver Lee and "so far as I know or ever heard, he always dealt on the square." Nevertheless, it was not long before a range war of the Lincoln County type began to fester.

== Early New Mexico life ==
Lee moved into the area from Texas with his half brother Perry Altman. They planned to raise and sell horses as well as to acquire land. C.L Sonnichsen relates that Oliver and Perry soon met Cherokee Bill. He suggested that they buy out "Frenchy" who had a place in Dog Canyon where he was raising fruit trees. He told them the area had a reliable water source. Perry is quoted as saying, "Well, Oliver this country is so damn sorry I think we can stay here a long time and never be bothered by anybody else." Lee's fair play ethics did not sit well with the local powerbrokers. The local power brokers at the time were Albert Fountain, John Good and others.

Lee later became friends with Albert Fall. The alliance would last for decades. It also put him on the side of the Democrats, who were at odds with the Republican faction led by Colonel Albert Jennings Fountain. Fountain was a powerful rival to land owners Lee and Fall. The struggle between them was characterized in the book "The Two Alberts - Fountain and Fall" (ISBN 1-881325-20-2). The political party in the majority in the area was the Republican, and these were an extension of the Santa Fe Ring, a secret coalition of lawmakers determined to control public offices in the New Mexico Territory.

== Albert Jennings Fountain murder case ==
The range war came to a boil in the winter of 1895-6. Colonel Fountain had gone to the Lincoln County court and obtained 32 indictments against 23 ranchers for theft of livestock or defacement of brands. Oliver Lee, Jim Gililland and William McNew were among the accused. This caused their being suspects in the February 1896 disappearance and presumed murder of Colonel Fountain and his 8-year-old son Henry. They were pursued by Sheriff Pat Garrett and a posse. Garrett and posse engaged in a gunbattle with Lee and Gililland near Alamogordo at Wildy Well, with Deputy Sheriff Kurt Kearney being killed. Lee later testified that Kearney and Garrett shot at Lee and Gililland, who were sleeping on the roof of the house at Wildy Well. Lee claimed the two were fired upon without being given the option to surrender, with him and Gililland returning fire. After Deputy Kearney was shot, Sheriff Garrett negotiated a truce and retreated with the mortally wounded Kearney.

It was almost three years before the matter was settled in court. These events led to the political maneuvering which led to the formation of Otero County. Lee believed that if he surrendered to Garrett he would never make it to trial. This is attested to in Dee Harkey's book "The Life of a New Mexico Lawman - Mean as Hell" (ISBN 0-941270-60-2). Lee's friend, Albert Fall and other Democrats offered to honor Otero, the Republican Governor, with the creation of a county named after him. The boundary of this new county would put the location, and so the jurisdiction of the Fountain case, in the new county. The only thing the Democrats wanted in exchange was that the sheriff of the new county would be their choice. Once the county was established and Lee's friend, George Curry was appointed sheriff, Lee promptly surrendered. Albert Fall and others defended Lee, McNew and Gilliland, who were charged with and tried in Hillsboro, New Mexico, for the crime of killing Henry Fountain (Albert's young son). No one was ever charged with the murder of Albert Fountain. Charges against McNew were dismissed, while Lee and Gililland were acquitted. Dee Harkey notes that it was interesting that none of the other ranchers indicted were ever pursued as suspects.

Oliver Lee later held office in the New Mexico Senate and continued operating his ranches until his own death in 1941, at the age of 76. He has several descendants still living and ranching in New Mexico.
