= White Sands, New Mexico =

Census-designated place in the United States

- Census-designated place
- Location of White Sands, New Mexico

- Location in the United States
- Coordinates: 32°22′32″N 106°28′52″W
- Country: United States
- State: New Mexico
- County: Doña Ana

Area
  - Total: 4.22 sq mi (10.94 km^{2})
  - Land: 4.22 sq mi (10.94 km^{2})
  - Water: 0 sq mi (0.00 km^{2})
- Elevation: 4,236 ft (1,291 m)

Population (2020)
  - Total: 926
  - Density: 219.2/sq mi (84.63/km^{2})
- Time zone: UTC-7 (Mountain (MST))
  - Summer (DST): UTC-6 (MDT)
- ZIP code: 88002
- Area code: 575
- FIPS code: 35-84845
- GNIS feature ID: 2409585

White Sands is a census-designated place (CDP) in Doña Ana County, New Mexico, United States. It consists of the main residential area on the White Sands Missile Range. As of the 2020 census, White Sands had a population of 926. It is part of the Las Cruces Metropolitan Statistical Area.

== Geography ==
The White Sands CDP is located in eastern Doña Ana County at the southern end of the White Sands Missile Range. It is 4 miles (6 km) south of U.S. Route 70 and 27 miles (43 km) east of Las Cruces, the county seat. The entrance to White Sands National Park is 34 miles (55 km) to the northeast, up US 70.

According to the United States Census Bureau, the CDP has a total area of 3.1 square miles (8.0 km^{2}), all land.

== Demographics ==
Historical population
Census	Pop.	Note	%±
2020	926		—
U.S. Decennial Census

As of the census of 2000, there were 1,323 people, 432 households, and 355 families residing in the CDP. The population density was 429.2 inhabitants per square mile (165.7/km^{2}). There were 667 housing units at an average density of 216.4 per square mile (83.6/km^{2}). The racial makeup of the CDP was 71.43% White, 11.56% African American, 0.98% Native American, 3.70% Asian, 0.08% Pacific Islander, 6.27% from other races, and 5.97% from two or more races. Hispanic or Latino of any race were 17.61% of the population.

There were 432 households, out of which 56.0% had children under the age of 18 living with them, 72.0% were married couples living together, 6.9% had a female householder with no husband present, and 17.8% were non-families. 16.4% of all households were made up of individuals, and none had someone living alone who was 65 years of age or older. The average household size was 3.06 and the average family size was 3.45.

In the CDP, the population was spread out, with 37.3% under the age of 18, 9.4% from 18 to 24, 39.7% from 25 to 44, 13.0% from 45 to 64, and 0.5% who were 65 years of age or older. The median age was 27 years. For every 100 females, there were 105.4 males. For every 100 females age 18 and over, there were 103.7 males.

The median income for a household in the CDP was $43,500, and the median income for a family was $47,750. Males had a median income of $40,402 versus $21,250 for females. The per capita income for the CDP was $16,186. About 1.5% of families and 2.6% of the population were below the poverty line, including 3.8% of those under age 18 and none of those age 65 or over.

== The desert ==
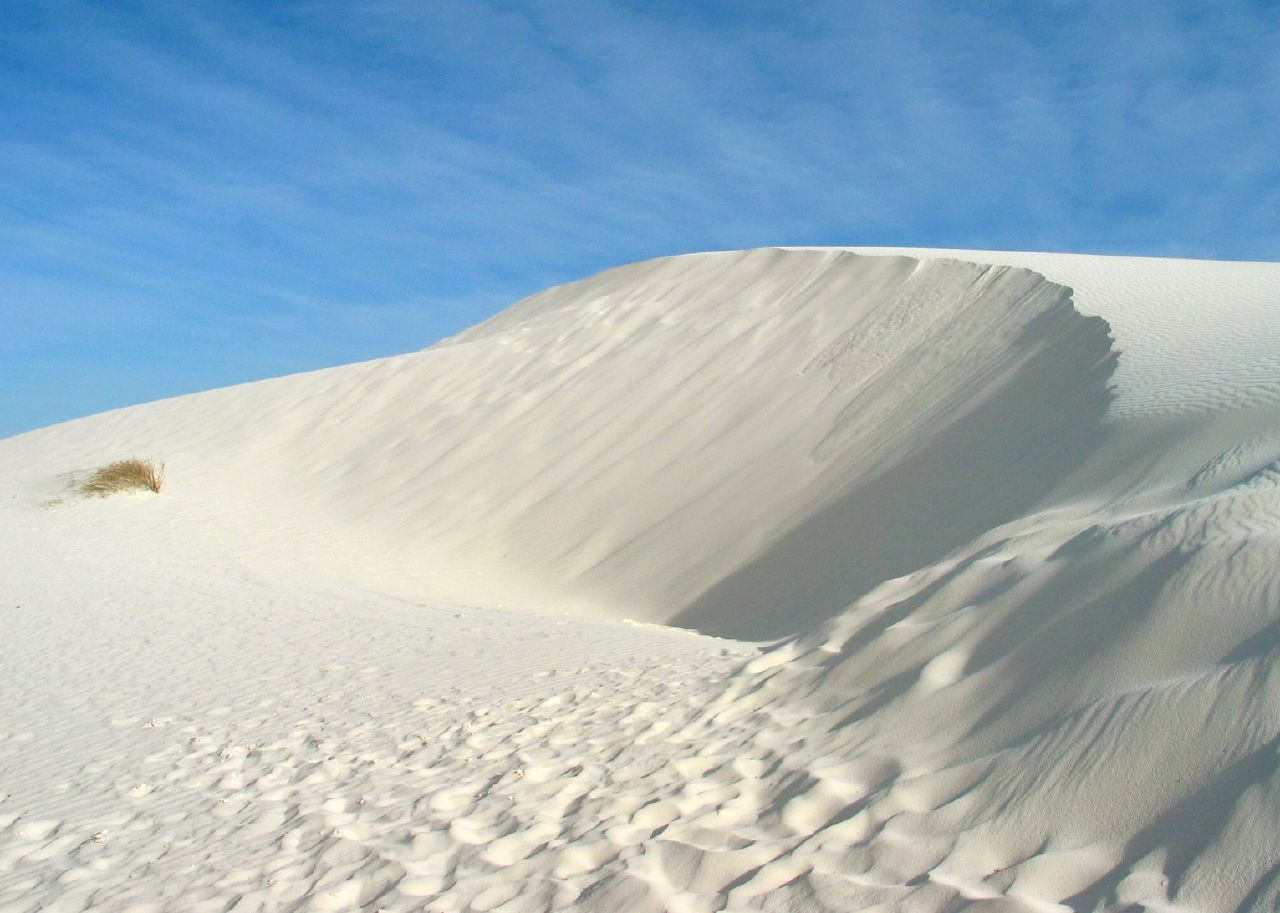
White Sands National Park

The desert is located in the Tularosa Basin of New Mexico. Its white sands are not composed of quartz, like most desert sands, but of gypsum, hydrated calcium sulfate. Unlike other desert sands, it is cool to the touch, due to the high rate of evaporation of surface moisture and the fact that the sands reflect, rather than absorb, the sun's rays. At 1185 meters above sea level, there are approximately 442 square kilometers of dune fields and is known to be the world's largest surface deposit of gypsum.

Gypsum is one of the most common mineral compounds found on Earth but is rarely seen on the surface, as it dissolves easily in water. The origin of this desert dates back to around 100 million years ago, during which it was covered by a shallow sea. As its waters gradually receded, saltwater lakes were left behind, which eventually evaporated in the sun. In addition to the salt, gypsum was also laid down in thick deposits on the old seabed.

The Sacramento and San Andres Mountains, with the Tularosa Basin between them, took shape approximately 250 million years ago. Giant upheavals in the Earth's crust distorted the land along with the gypsum deposits, forcing them high into the air about 70 million years ago. Rainfall and melt water came from the mountains causing the gypsum to percolate out and the concentrated solutions were washed down the mountainsides. The gypsum solution accumulated in Lake Lucero, the lowest part of the Tularosa Basin. Water in the lake does not have any means of escaping except by evaporation, which leaves behind thin layers of crystallized gypsum, or selenite. Weathering then reduced these crystals to fine, sandy grains. Winds then carried the grains farther up the basin, and the grains piled in steep dunes that often reach as high as 15 m (50 ft). The winds carved more dunes and, while at the same time, carried small amounts of the gypsum grains by distances of up to 9 m (30 ft) a year.

This constant movement still occurs today, and with the added alkaline and the little amount of rainfall makes it difficult for plants to grow here, leaving the desert as desolate as it appears today.

== Education ==
It is located in Las Cruces Public Schools. White Sands School is on the property of the White Sands Missile Range.

== See also ==
- X to Y, 2009 short film
