= List of New Mexico suffragists =

This is a list of New Mexico suffragists, suffrage groups and others associated with the cause of women's suffrage in New Mexico.

== Groups ==
- Albuquerque Suffrage Club.
- New Mexico State Federation of Women's Clubs.
- New Mexico Women's Suffrage League.

== Suffragists ==
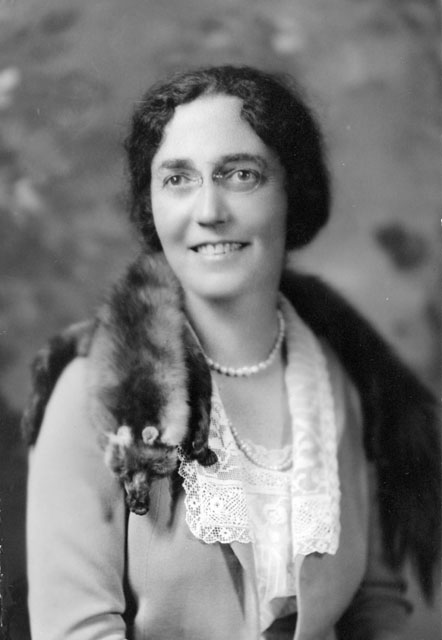
Adelina Otero-Warren in the 1910s

- Julia Duncan Brown Asplund (Albuquerque).
- Marguerite Baca.
- Grace Thorpe Bear (Roswell).
- Trinidad Cabeza de Baca (Santa Fe).
- Florence Moss Carr (Portales).
- Margaret Cartwright.
- Ina Sizer Cassidy (Santa Fe).
- Dolores Chávez de Armijo (Santa Fe).
- Harriet Grace Donohoo (Tucumcarli).
- Emma Morgan Fall.
- Isabella Muro Ferguson.
- Jennie Fortune (Socorro).
- Laura Frenger (Las Cruces).
- Kate Hall.
- Anna Larkin (Las Vegas).
- Deane Lindsey (Portales).
- Aurora Lucero-White Lea (Las Vegas).
- Margaret Kent Medler (Albuquerque).
- Ada McPherson Morley (Datil).
- Nina Otero-Warren (Santa Fe).
- Ellen J. Palen.
- Alida Sims (Albuquerque).
- Clara Strong (Albuquerque).
- Ella St. Clair Thompson.
- Ann Webster.
- Isabel Wilson (Albuquerque).

== Suffragists who campaigned in New Mexico ==
- Carrie Chapman Catt.
- Laura M. Johns.
- Anne Martin.
- Jessie A. Russell.
- Ella St. Clair Thompson.
- Jessie Hardy Stubbs.
- Mabel Vernon.

== Politicians supporting suffrage ==
- Albert Fall.
- Andrieus Aristieus Jones (Socorro).
- William B. Walton.

== See also ==
- Timeline of women's suffrage in New Mexico
- Women's suffrage in New Mexico
- Women's suffrage in states of the United States
- Women's suffrage in the United States
