= Timeline of women's suffrage in New Mexico =

This is a timeline of women's suffrage in New Mexico. Women's suffrage in New Mexico first began with granting women the right to vote in school board elections and was codified into the New Mexico State Constitution, written in 1910. In 1912, New Mexico was a state, and suffragists there worked to support the adoption of a federal women's suffrage amendment to allow women equal suffrage. Even after white women earned the right to vote in 1920, many Native Americans were unable to vote in the state.

== 1890s ==
1893

- The Albuquerque Suffrage Club is organized to work for women's suffrage in the territory of New Mexico.

1899

- Carrie Chapman Catt is working to organize suffragists in Santa Fe.

== 1910s ==
1905

- The Woman's Club of Albuquerque celebrates Susan B. Anthony's 85th birthday.

1910

- August: The Women's Christian Temperance Union (WCTU) in New Mexico holds the first public debate on women's suffrage in the state.
- November 21: Ratification of the New Mexico State Constitution. Originally, it included limited provisions for women voting, but this was eventually rejected.

1912

- New Mexico becomes a state, but Native Americans are still not allowed to vote. Women can only vote in school board elections.

1914

- The Congressional Union sends their first organizer, Mabel Vernon, to New Mexico.
- May Jessie Hardy Stubbs organizes a suffrage demonstration in Santa Fe and helps create the New Mexico Women's Suffrage League.

1915

- October 15: suffrage parade of around 150 women marched through Santa Fe to the home of Senator Thomas Benton Catron to demand women's suffrage.

1916

- October: California suffragist, Dr. Jessie A. Russell, tours New Mexico to support suffrage through the Republican Party.
- Senator Andrieus A. Jones becomes chair of the Senate's Woman Suffrage Committee in the Senate.

1917

- Suffragist Adelina Otero Warren is asked to take charge of the New Mexico chapter of the Congressional Union.
- April Santa Fe chapters of NAWSA and the National Women's Party (NWP) educate women voters and encourage them to vote in the upcoming school board election.

== 1920s ==
1920

- January: The New Mexican Republican Party sends Nina Otero-Warren the Republican Conference in Denver as their representative to the Republican Women's Committee.
- February 21: New Mexico is the 32nd state to ratify the 19th Amendment.
- March: The Woman's Party creates an all-female ticket.
- The New Mexico chapter of NAWSA disbands and creates the League.

1922

- Former suffragists form the New Mexico League of Women Voters with Ina Sizer Cassidy as the first president. .

1924

- The Indian Citizenship Act allowed Native Americans who did not live on reservations in New Mexico the right to vote.

== 1940s ==
1948

- All Native Americans gain the right to vote in New Mexico after the court case of Trujillo v. Garley which was brought by Miguel Trujillo.

== See also ==
- List of New Mexico suffragists
- Women's suffrage in New Mexico
- Women's suffrage in the United States
