= Women's suffrage in New Mexico =

Review of the topic

The fight for women's suffrage in New Mexico was incremental and had the support of both Hispanic and Anglo women suffragists. When New Mexico was a territory, women had the right to vote in school board elections. When New Mexico created its state constitution in 1910, it continued to allow women to vote in school elections, but it was nearly impossible to modify the constitution for suffrage any further. Women in the state chose to pursue advocating for a federal women's suffrage amendment. They organized among both English and Spanish speaking groups. Many New Mexico politicians supported suffrage on a federal level. Continued advocacy on behalf of suffragists in the state allowed New Mexico to become the 32nd state to ratify the Nineteenth Amendment on February 21, 1920.

== Early efforts ==
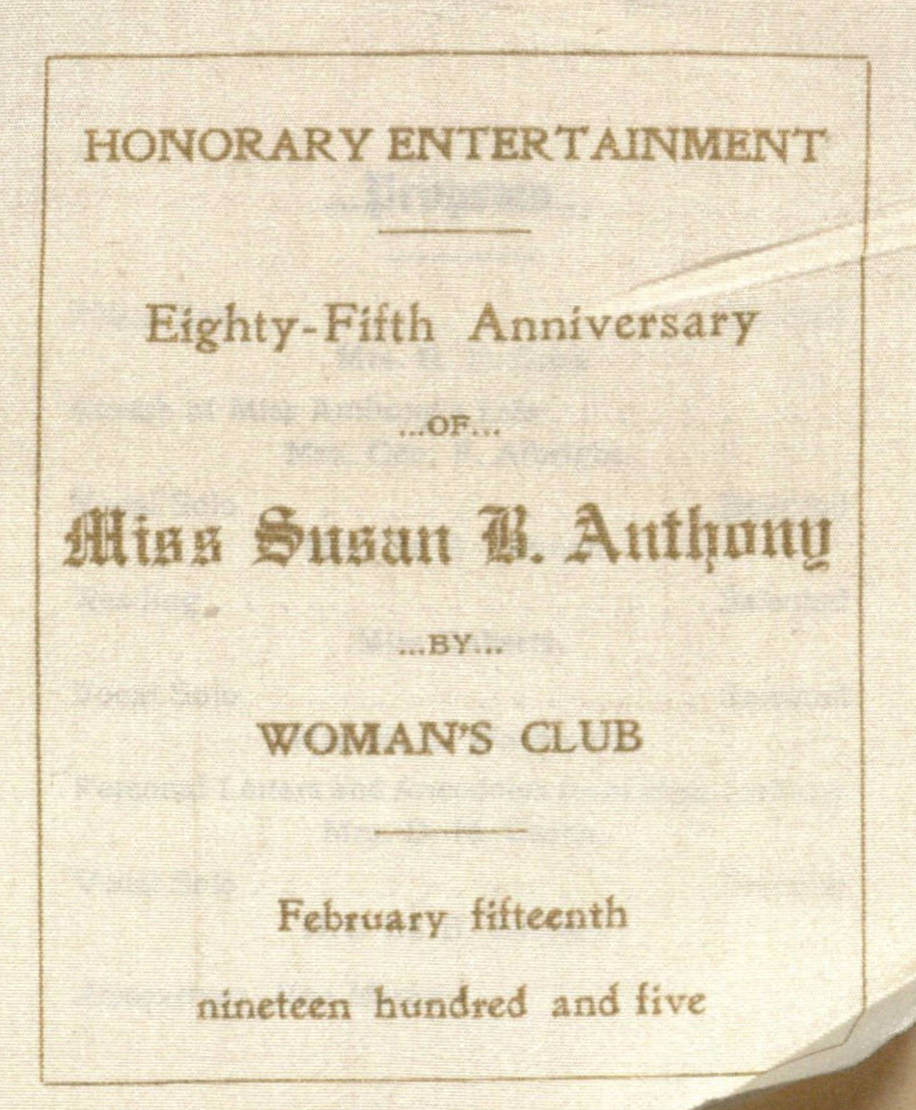
Program from the 85th anniversary for Susan B Anthony by the Woman's Club of Albuquerque.

Women under the Republic of Mexico in the land that became New Mexico had more rights than women in the United States did at the time. During the time that New Mexico was a territory of the United States, women were allowed to vote in school board elections. In the 1890s, women's clubs began to form in New Mexico, and these served as a way for women to communicate and advocate for various causes. Clubs formed in Las Vegas, New Mexico, Santa Fe, Las Cruces and in Albuquerque. Many women in the clubs admired leaders in the national suffrage movement. The Woman's Club of Albuquerque celebrated Susan B. Anthony's 85th birthday in February 1905.

In 1910, New Mexico was eligible to become a state and a state constitutional convention was held. Just before the convening of the convention, the New Mexico Women's Christian Temperance Union (WCTU) held a public debate on women's suffrage. This debate took place in August in Mountainair, New Mexico and featured the president of the University of New Mexico and a socialist.

Most delegates to the convention did not women participating in politics. Nevertheless, during the convention which began on October 3, librarian, Julia Duncan Brown Asplund, attended each day and petitioned delegates to provide partial suffrage for women in the right to vote in school elections. Delegate Solomon Luna, uncle of prominent New Mexican suffragist, Nina Otero-Warren, and H.O Bursum were both pro-suffrage. Delegate Reuben Heflin, a Democrat from Farmington introduced the school election provision early on during the convention. On November 8, the convention's Committee on Elective Franchise sponsored a "motion to strike out the limited franchise for women." Two of the delegates were very opposed to women voting even in school elections were Delegates Dougherty and Sena. Dougherty stated that he didn't believe women in New Mexico wanted to vote and Sena claimed that voting would lead to harm for women. After this, the Woman's Club of Albuquerque presented a petition for partial suffrage to the convention through Delegate Stover. The provision to allow women to vote did pass and was adopted in the final draft of the constitution which was passed on November 21. However, the constitution was also written in such a way that adding other voting rights would be difficult. The constitution required that three-fourths of all voters in each county in New Mexico would have to approve any changes to suffrage in the state.

== Organizing ==
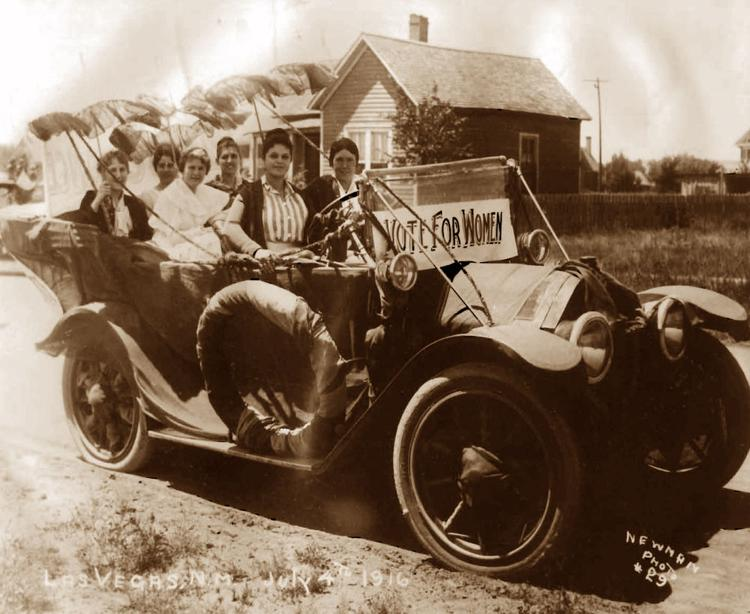
Women preparing to campaign in Las Vegas, New Mexico.

Mabel Vernon was the first organizer from the Congressional Union (CU) to visit New Mexico arriving in 1914. She started recruiting within the state WCTU, but then later switched tactics, focusing on the more socially influential clubwomen in other groups. In May 1914, another CU organizer, Jessie Hardy Stubbs, organized a suffrage demonstration in Santa Fe that led to the creation of the New Mexico Women's Suffrage League.

One of the politicians who created obstacles for women in New Mexico who wanted full suffrage was Senator Thomas Benton Catron. A letter-writing campaign to Catron was kicked off in 1914. Women also visited him at his home in Santa-Fe and in Washington, D.C., lobbying for women's suffrage. Representative Benigno Cardenas Hernandez followed the lead of Senator Catron in his role in the House. The lobbying and work against Catron began to make him a "political liability to the Republicans."

Also in 1914, the national General Federation of Women's Clubs (GFWC) came out in support of women's suffrage and the New Mexico chapter, the New Mexico Federation of Women's Clubs (NMFWC) followed suit. In July 1915, the CU built on the endorsement of women's suffrage from NMFWC and held drives to organize.

On October 15, 1915, around 150 women of both Hispanic and Anglo backgrounds marched for women's suffrage in Santa Fe. The parade, which ended at the house of anti-suffrage Senator Catron, included suffragists Dolores Chávez de Armijo, Aurora Lucero-White Lea, and Trinidad Cabeza de Baca who lent her car to the parade. Leaflets given out during the event were printed in both English and Spanish. Lucero and Arabella Romero were among the women who gave speeches in favor of women's suffrage at Senator Catron's home. Catron, however, was not persuaded and instead explained why he thought women's suffrage was wrong. The event also included a visit from Ella St. Clair Thompson from the Congressional Union. Deane Lindsey helped found a local suffrage organization in Santa Fe that October.

Lucero-White Lea and Otero-Warren traveled across New Mexico, speaking primarily to Hispanic women on behalf of the CU. By 1916, the CU had created a New Mexico chapter.

Dr. Jessie A. Russell from California came in 1916 to help organize women's clubs and to get women involved in the Republican Party. The Republicans had nominated Frank Hubbell to run against Catron, but Hubbell, while pro-suffrage was an unpopular candidate. Russell helped organize women politically and Russell tried to attract more progressive-leaning women. However, Hubbell was defeated, but so was Senator Catron, who lost to Andrieus Aristieus Jones. After Senator Catron lost in 1916, women's suffrage gained more support and success in New Mexico. Jones began to immediately work in the U.S. Senate to introduce women's suffrage as a federal amendment as chair of the Senate Committee for Women's Suffrage.

The Santa Fe chapters of the NAWSA and the National Women's Party (NWP) encouraged and educated women voters about how to vote in the upcoming school board elections in April 1917. Women had a lot of difficulty voting in this election when polling places were changed without notice. Instead of being discouraged, the experience convinced more women that they needed to become involved in politics and have the right to vote in order to fix the problems they encountered.

During World War I, suffragists in New Mexico were led in their contributions to the war effort by the wife of the governor, Deane Lindsey, who was also a suffragist herself. The women's efforts to aid in the war helped change the public opinion in favor of women's suffrage in New Mexico.

== National amendment ==
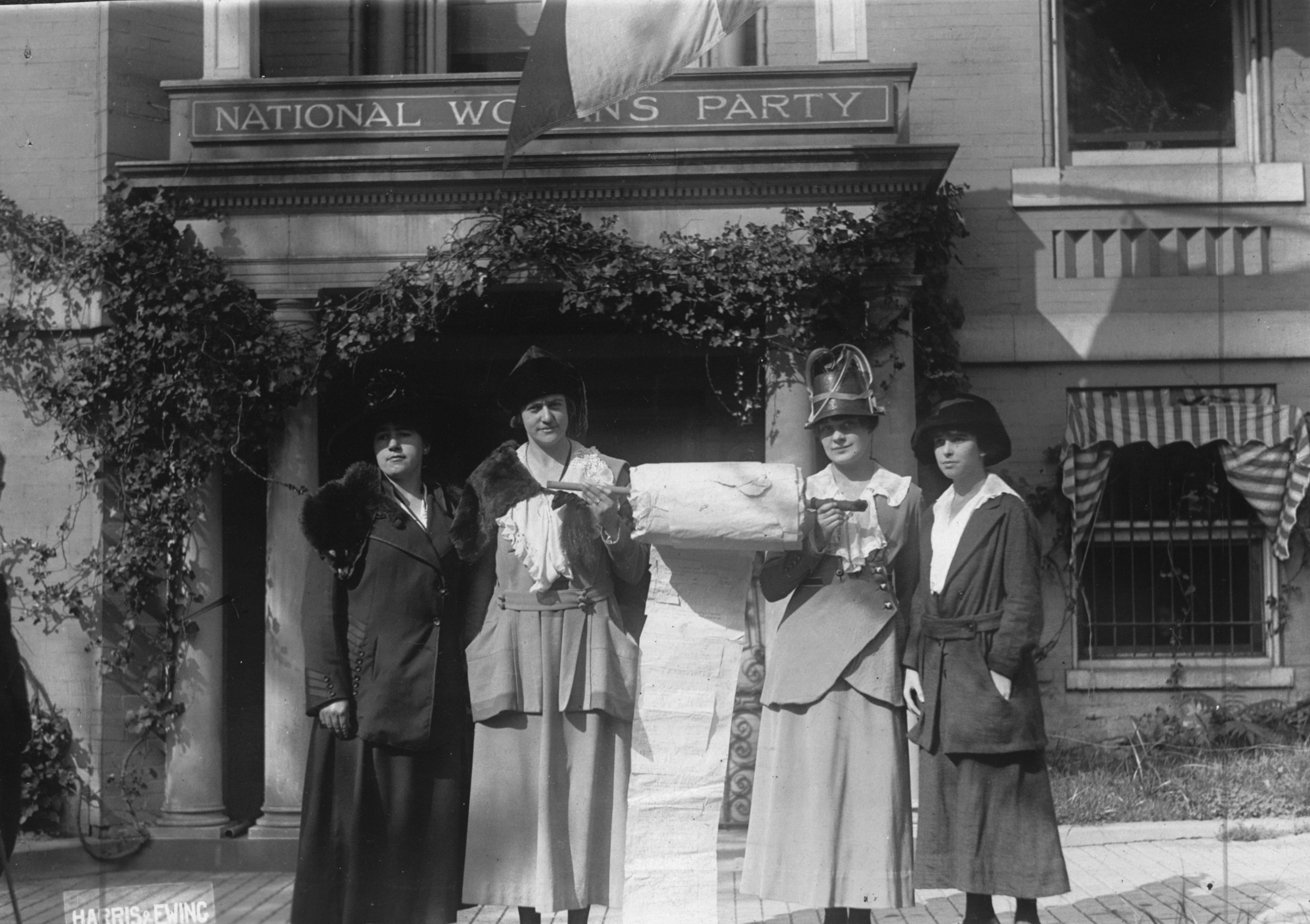
Annie Fraher, Bertha Moller, Berthe Arnold and Anita Pollitzer leave the National Women's Party headquarters in Washington, D.C. to take a petition to Senator A. A. Jones of New Mexico.

Otero-Warren lobbied Representative William Walton and convinced him to support women's suffrage and the national women's suffrage amendment. Walton voted on the suffrage amendment in the U.S. House in January 1918. Senator Jones passed the amendment out of the Senate Committee and helped to see it pass the Senate in June 1919.

New Mexico became important to the ratification process of the Nineteenth Amendment. Many suffragists hoped that New Mexico would be the first state to ratify the 19th Amendment. Otero-Warren heavy lobbied Hispanic members of the state house of representatives and convinced them to support the ratification of the amendment. In January 1919, the amendment passed easily in the New Mexico House, but was stalled in the Senate.

In January 1920, at the Republican conference in Denver, Otero-Warren attended as a delegate to the Republican Women's Committee. Also at the convention, Governor Octaviano Larrozolo announced that he would work towards ratification of the 19th Amendment in New Mexico. Plans to oppose women's suffrage included introducing state referendum amendments, which would stall the process and complicated plots to encourage Hispanic politicians to oppose suffrage so that anti-suffrage Anglos could blame them for the suffrage amendment not passing.

That January, Governor Larrozolo called for a special session of the New Mexico State Legislature to convene on February 16 to address the ratification of the 19th amendment. On the last day of the special session, Otero-Warren held a 3-hour private meeting with the Republican Caucus. After this meeting, Dan Padilla withdrew his attempt to create a referendum amendment to stall the adoption of women's suffrage and the Republican leader, R. I. Baca, also shifted his support for suffrage. On February 18, the Senate gallery was "packed" with suffragists and the Senate passed the amendment. The House passed the next day, making New Mexico the 32nd state to ratify the amendment.

Before women in Santa-Fe went to the polls for the first time in 1920 to vote in the general election, information on voting was provided in both English and Spanish. It became a custom among Nuevomexicanas to register to vote on their twenty-first birthday during the 1920s.

Also after the passage of the 19th Amendment, a large number of New Mexican women entered politics and worked prominently in various state and local organizations. Many women ran for office and often ran on the Republican ticket. Some of these were former suffragists, such as Anna Larkin and Clara Strong.

== See also ==
- List of New Mexico suffragists
- Native American civil rights § Voting — exception to women's suffrage for four decades
- Timeline of women's suffrage in New Mexico
- Women's suffrage in states of the United States
- Women's suffrage in the United States
