= Ada McPherson Morley =

American author, suffragist and rancher

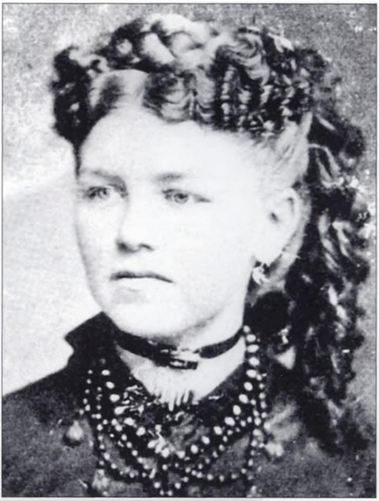
Ada McPherson Morley in 1882

Ada McPherson Morley (August 26, 1852 – December 9, 1917) was an American author, suffragist and rancher. Early in her time in New Mexico, she and her husband edited a newspaper and took on the Santa Fe Ring both in print and in business matters. Morley became involved with the New Mexico chapter of the Women's Christian Temperance Union (WCTU) and later served as president. She was also involved in women's suffrage in New Mexico and helped recruit women into the Congressional Union (CU) later in her life. Morley owned a ranch in the Datil Mountains where she raised cattle and was able to host meetings.

== Biography ==
Ada McPherson was born on August 26, 1852, in Winterset, Iowa. Her father, Marcus L. McPherson, was a state senator. Ada McPerson started a New Mexico chapter of the Society for the Prevention of Cruelty to Animals (SPCA). In 1872, she earned a degree in English Literature, one of two women in the inaugural class of the first co-ed land grant college, now called Iowa State University. She married William Raymond Morley, who she met in college. In 1872, she and her husband and moved to Cimarron, New Mexico Territory, where he was working as general manager, surveyor, and chief engineer of the Maxwell Land Grant and Railway Company. The Company had claimed 1.7 million acres without regard to Native American and Hispanic land rights. Thomas B. Catron who would become Ada’s nemesis, was part of the "Santa Fe Ring" which acquired land through dishonest dealings and exploitation. The Morleys covered Catron and the illegal and unethical activities of the Santa Fe Ring in the Cimarron News, where Ray was the owner and editor. Her daughter, Agnes Morley Cleaveland was born on June 26, 1874.

Ada was arrested at the post office after attempting to intercept a letter critical of Catron written by her mother before it was mailed. Catron accused her of mail fraud and filed legal charges that took years to resolve. A gunfighter, Clay Allison who was an associate of Ray, even became involved in the case. He threatened anyone who would bring Ada Morley to trial. The Morleys moved to Las Vegas, New Mexico in 1878. On October 25, 1882 Ada McPherson Morley put the last spike where two railways met in Nogales, Arizona.

Ray Morley's life was under threat by the Santa Fe Ring, but it is generally agreed that he died in 1883 from an accidental gunshot wound while doing engineering work in Chihuahua, Mexico. Ada’s second husband, Floyd Jarrett, a cattle investor, persuaded her to move to a ranch in the remote Datil Mountains, though he soon left the family.Ada continued her activism while raising her three children and managing the ranch and cattle business. She became known as the "Cattle Queen of New Mexico." She hosted many visitors working on women’s rights and other causes at the “White House of Datil Canyon,” her two-story house with many bedrooms.

Ada kept in touch with suffragists in Iowa, New York, Chicago, and Philadelphia. As a member of the National American Woman Suffrage Association (NAWSA), she worked with Carrie Chapman Catt, who also graduated from Iowa Agricultural College, Ada’s alma mater. By the 1890’s Ada was very active in the Women’s Christian Temperance Union (WCTU) and served as Superintendent of Franchise of the New Mexico chapter. Later as NMWCTU state president, Ada epitomized WCTU leader Frances Willard's "Do Everything" philosophy, developing women’s leadership skills through women’s clubs, literary societies, and church groups.

Despite the vast distances, she traveled frequently throughout New Mexico advocating for improvements in public health, education, and funding for libraries. she was successful in campaigning for laws to protect children from dangerous working conditions and sexual exploitation. She fought for the vote as the only way to advance women’s rights and enlightened policies.

Though blind from 1905 on, Ada organized and led the NMWCTU’s debate on women’s suffrage at the Chautauqua held in Mountainair, New Mexico, in August 1910. Her efforts, along with those of Nina Otero-Warren, Julia Brown Asplund, and others, were instrumental in getting very limited school suffrage into the New Mexico’s 1910 Constitution. After the New Mexico legislators failed to include full suffrage in the constitution, Ada ramped up efforts to get the federal amendment passed. She assisted suffragists, writers, and leaders around the country in promoting the women’s vote as a means of making social and moral reforms.

Ada joined the Congressional Union for Woman Suffrage (later known as the National Woman's Party) in 1914 and collaborated with national leaders on strategies to get Congress to pass the 19th Amendment. Despite facing poor health, she worked to recruit members to the CU in Magdalena, New Mexico in 1916. Declaring that “Disenfranchisement is a disgrace,” she organized suffragists from around the country to “bombard” Catron, New Mexico's state senator who headed the Senate Committee on Woman Suffrage. He sabotaged all efforts to let legislation advance out of his committee the Senate floor and suffragists publicly opposed him.

Over thirty-five years, Ada Morley wrote hundreds of letters to Congress advocating for the women’s vote. She wrote around 100 letters every month, and walked 3 miles to the closest post office to mail them. By the 1916 election, both parties in New Mexico were pro-suffrage, so Catron’s obstruction of the women’s vote lost him the primary. Undaunted, just days before leaving office, Catron railed on the Senate floor about the immense dangers to family life and societal norms if women were granted the vote. Fortunately, Ada lived long enough to see Senator Andrieus A. Jones of Las Vegas, New Mexico, replace Catron as Chair of the Senate Committee on Woman Suffrage.

Morley spent her last years on her ranch in Datil, living with her sister, Lorraine Lavender. Ada MacPherson Morley died on December 9, 1917, and is buried in Datil, Catron County. The Evening Herald declared Ada Morley’s death a major loss to New Mexico, California, and Colorado.

== See also ==
- Women's suffrage in New Mexico
- List of New Mexico suffragists
