= Aurora Lucero-White Lea =

American folklorist, author, and suffragist

- Born: Aurora R. Lucero; February 8, 1894; Las Vegas, New Mexico, United States
- Died: 1965 (aged 70–71); New Mexico, United States
- Spouse(s): George White (m. 1918); Preston King Lea
- Children: 3

Aurora Lucero-White Lea (February 8, 1894 – 1965) was an American folklorist, writer, and suffragist. She was a proud Nuevomexicana, advocating for bilingual education in English and Spanish and working to preserve the heritage of the Hispanic Southwest. Lucero-White Lea is best known for her 1953 work Literary Folklore of the Hispanic Southwest, a compilation of cultural traditions, songs, and stories collected while traveling northern New Mexico.

== Early life ==
Aurora R. Lucero was born in New Mexico on February 8, 1894. She was the eldest of seven children born to Julianita Romero and Antonio J. Lucero, who would serve as New Mexico's first Secretary of State from 1912 to 1916. Her family was wealthy and politically well-connected.

Lucero attended public schools in Las Vegas, beginning her college studies at New Mexico Normal University. The family moved to Santa Fe when her father became Secretary of State, and she worked in her father's office. She accompanied her father to Washington, D.C., and became a delegate of the Ladies Delegation Aides.

She married George White in 1919 and had a daughter, Dolores. Lucero-White returned to New Mexico to continue her studies at the New Mexico Normal University, graduating with a teaching degree in 1915 and receiving a bachelor's degree in 1925. In 1916, Lucero moved to Tucumcari, taking her first teaching assignment as the head of the Spanish department in the school system.

== Activism ==
As a teenager, Lucero gave a speech advocating the use of Spanish in the public schools in a persuasive speaking competition on the campus of the New Mexico Normal University in 1910. The speech was an impassioned response to an act requiring complete fluency in English for any New Mexican officeholder, which Nuevomexicanos saw as a form of discrimination.

On October 21, 1915, one hundred and fifty women marched through Santa Fe, around the Capitol and to the home of Senator Thomas Benton Catron, who they hoped would support the Susan B. Anthony Amendment. Ella St. Clair Thompson of the Congressional Union for Woman Suffrage, recognizing the importance of working with Spanish-speaking women, asked Lucero and Nina Otero-Warren to speak at the event. Together with Otero-Warren, Lucero insisted on bilingual access to suffrage publications and speeches, saying, "I speak for the Spanish American women who, while conservative, want the best possible laws where their home life is the question at issue." Although Senator Catron did not support the amendment, the event received significant press coverage.

== Research and writing ==
She took a position as the San Miguel County superintendent of schools from 1925 to 1927, traveling throughout the state for her job. During this time, she began to record the cultural folktales, songs, dances, and stories of the Hispanic villages.

In 1927, Lucero-White was appointed assistant professor of Spanish at her alma mater, New Mexico Normal University. She received a master's degree in Spanish literature from that school in 1932; her master's thesis was titled "Coloquios de los Pastores," about a Christmas folk play. She was appointed assistant superintendent of instruction for the New Mexico Department of Education in 1934, allowing her to include traditional folklore in the state's curriculum.

She wrote several historical plays, including Los Pastores (1936), based on a traditional Spanish folk-drama, and Kearney Takes Las Vegas (1934), based on the true story of the U.S. occupation of New Mexico under General Stephen W. Kearny.

Other writings include More About the Matachines, an article suggesting origins of the dance performed by both Hispanos and by Pueblo Indians. Her best known work is Literary Folklore of the Hispanic Southwest (1953), a compilation of dances, folk-plays, children's games, ballads, and more. Along with Cleofas Martínez Jaramillo, she helped found La Sociedad Folklorica in 1935, a Santa Fe organization dedicated to preserving the customs and traditions of the descendants of colonial Spaniards.

Lucero-White Lea retired from teaching in 1960 and died in 1965.

== Legacy ==
Lucero-White Lea was one of six New Mexican women commended for fighting for women's right to vote in a memorial bill passed by the New Mexico legislature in February 2020 titled "Centennial Of 19th Amendment", along with Laura E. Frenger, Nina Otero-Warren, Ina Sizer Cassidy, and Julia Asplund.

== Selected works ==
- Lucero-White Lea, Aurora (1941). The folklore of New Mexico : romances, corridos, cuentos, proverbios, dichos, adivinanzas. Santa Fe: Seton village Press. OCLC 602297756.
- Lucero-White Lea, Aurora (1947). Los hispanos : five essays on the folkways of the hispanos as seen through the eyes of one of them. Denver: Sage Books. OCLC 2988907.
- Lucero-White Lea, Aurora (1953). Literary folklore of the Hispanic Southwest. San Antonio: Naylor Co. OCLC 1140417111.
- Lucero-White Lea, Aurora (1962). Juan Bobo : adapted from the Spanish folk tale Bertoldo. New York: Vantage Press. OCLC 8320763.

== See also ==
- List of suffragists and suffragettes
- Timeline of women's suffrage
