= Cleofas Martínez Jaramillo =

American folklorist, writer, businesswoman (1878–1956)

Cleofas Martinez Jaramillo
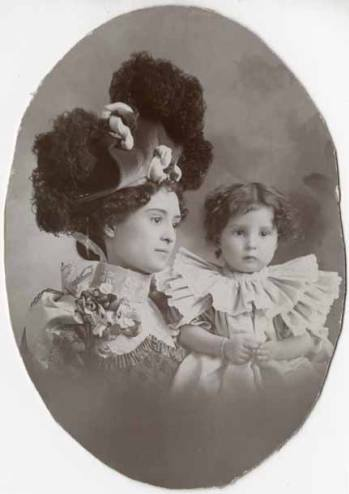
- Born: Cleofas Martinez; December 6, 1878; Arroyo Hondo, Taos County, New Mexico
- Died: November 30, 1956 (aged 77); El Paso, Texas
- Occupations: Writer, folklorist, businesswoman
- Organization: La Sociedad Folklórica de Santa Fe (founder)
- Spouse: Venceslao Jaramillo (married 1898–1920)
- Children: 3

Cleofas Martínez Jaramillo (6 December 1878 – 30 November 1956) was an American folklorist, writer, and businesswoman. She co-founded La Sociedad Folklόrica de Santa Fe (Folklore Society of Santa Fe), playing a vital role in preserving Spanish culture and tradition in New Mexico.

== Early life ==
Cleofas Martinez was born 6 December 1878 in Arroyo Hondo, New Mexico, one of seven children born to Julian Antonio Martinez and Marina Lucero de Martinez. They were descended from the first families to have settled the village, and lived comfortably. At the age of nine, she was sent to the Loretto Convent School in Taos, and later attended the academy in Santa Fe.

Aged 20, she married her cousin, businessman Venceslao Jaramillo. The couple lived in El Rito where they ran a sheep business. In 1912, he served in the inaugural state legislature representing Rio Arriba County at the New Mexico state constitutional convention. They later moved to Denver.

Jaramillo outlived her husband and all of their children. Though the couple had three children together, only one – Angelina – survived infancy. In 1920, Venceslao died, leaving Jaramillo to fight to prove her right to his assets, while raising Angelina (age 4). The pair returned to Sante Fe.

In 1931, her teenage daughter Angelina was murdered in their home. Jaramillo later wrote of the incident, "Destiny, still not satisfied, seemed bent on crushing me down to the very last of my endurance."

Described by her biographers as "strong-willed", Cleofas Jaramillo made a success of her subsequent business ventures.

== Career ==
In common with other folklorists of the era, Jaramillo wrote in an attempt to preserve the Hispanic culture she believed was under threat. Her writings included Mexican and Spanish recipes, stories and folklore, and a memoir.

She published her first book, Spanish Fairy Tales, in 1939. That same year, she also published a cookbook, The Genuine New Mexico Tasty Recipes. Her 1941 book In the Shadows of the Past, described the folklore and life in Arroyo Hondo in the 1870s and 1880s.

In her 1955 memoir, Romance of a Little Village Girl, Jaramillo described the daily life, customs, and culture of her youth, exploring the progressive loss of Hispanic culture in New Mexico. Though troubled by writing in English, Jaramillo sought as wide a readership as possible.

Some critics have viewed Jaramillo's account as one-sided, noting the exclusion of the state's Native American people and culture.

== Folklore ==
In 1935, with Aurora Lucero-White Lea, Jaramillo founded La Sociedad Folklόrica de Santa Fe (the Folkloric Society of Santa Fe). Jaramillo drew on a familial heritage of preservationism, her mother having been a "gifted storyteller", and her brother having contributed traditional stories to the New Mexico Federal Writers' Project. Wary of a culture shift caused by newcomers to the area, whose romanticization of culture and custom Jaramillo resented, the Society was a pushback against the erosion of Hispanic culture and the perceived tendency towards assimilation. Feeling that even admirers of the culture often misunderstood the underlying values and traditions, Jaramillo and her fellow New Mexican folklorists sought to authentically preserve and celebrate what they worried was being lost.

Of Jaramillo and her peers, Fabiola Cabeza de Baca and Adelina Otero-Warren, feminist critic Tey Diana Rebolledo has written that they were "remarkable for their concerns and their production at a time when most Hispanas/Mexicans had little education, or if they were educated, little leisure or encouragement to write." She added that:

They did so against the overwhelming dominance of Anglo culture and language, and against the patriarchal norms of their own culture. Their narratives are valuable not only because they preserve accounts of folk life but also because, in particular, they recorded the details women considered important, details rarely included in male narratives. Thus we are able to glimpse something of the female experience usually left out of history.

== Death and legacy ==
Jaramillo's last work, her memoir, was published in 1955 and has been described as a "classic work of Southwest literature." She died in El Paso, Texas, on 30 November 1956.

Rose Rodriguez-Rabin, has described Cleofas Jaramillo as leaving an "estimable legacy", and as a folklorist who "in her own fashion reclaimed the lost traditions and customs of her people".

== Bibliography ==
- The Genuine New Mexico Tasty Recipes: Potajes sabrosos (1939)
- Cuentos del hogar (1939)
- Shadows of the Past (1941)
- Romance of a Little Village Girl (1955)
