= Agnes Morley Cleaveland =

American writer and cattle rancher (1874–1958)

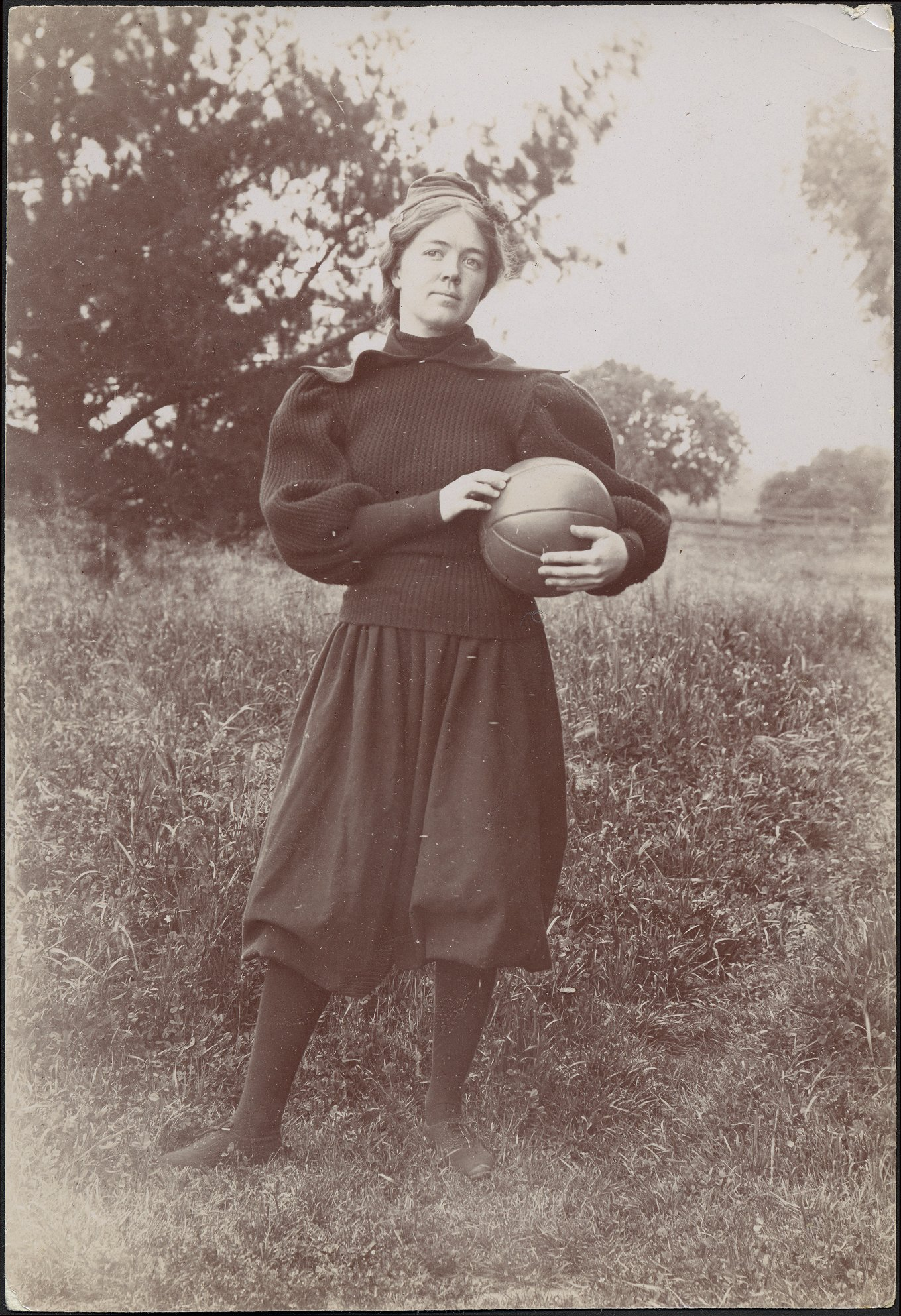
- Agnes Morley
- Born: 1874; Cimarron, Territory of New Mexico
- Died: 1958 (aged 83–84); Datil, New Mexico, US
- Occupation: Writer
- Spouse(s): Mason Chase, Newton Cleaveland
- Children: 4

Agnes Morley Cleaveland (1874–1958) was an American writer and cattle rancher who lived in New Mexico and California. Her book about growing up on a New Mexico ranch in the late 19th-century, No Life for a Lady, was a best seller. She was active in politics and journalism as well as in public speaking and as a women's club organizer.

== Early life ==
Agnes Morley was the oldest child of railroad engineer William Raymond Morley and author Ada McPherson Morley. Her siblings were William Raymond Morley, Jr. and Ada "Lora" Loraine Morley. Her father ran the Cimarron News as well as being the head of engineering for the Maxwell Land Grant and Railway Company during the Colfax County War. After her father's death, her mother remarried and the family moved to remote ranchland near Datil, New Mexico.

Along with her brother Bill Morley, she helped manage the ranch after her stepfather disappeared. Their mother Ada spent much of her time writing letters to authors, speakers, and politicians, including Susan B. Anthony; in 1896 she published a biography of Francis Schlatter called The Life of the Harp in the Hands of the Harper. The children grew up riding the range, working with horses and cattle, and hunting grizzly bears.

== Education ==
Morley went away to high school in Philadelphia and Ann Arbor, and to college at Stanford University, where she played guard on the women's basketball team. In 1896, she was in the first inter-collegiate women's sporting event, playing for the Stanford women's basketball team against University of California, Berkeley. The players wore bloomers, and an audience of 500 women attended; no men were allowed at the game, which took place in the Armory Hall. She graduated from Stanford in 1900.

== Career ==
Morley was an early member and organizer of the California Writers Club. She wrote several stories and articles with Eugene Manlove Rhodes. She was also the head of the local chapter for the National Organization of Republican Women and Pro America, and headed the California Federation of Women's Clubs.

Her book No Life for a Lady was published in 1941. It won a publisher's award and was critically acclaimed. It was released in a special edition for the U.S. Armed Forces during World War II.

== Marriage and children ==
Morley was briefly married as a teenager, in 1892, to Mason Chase.

In 1899, Morley married Newton Cleaveland. They lived in Berkeley and often stayed in New Mexico. They had four children: Norman Cleaveland, Loraine (Keffer) Lavender, (Agnes) Morley Cleaveland, and Mary Cleaveland Wohlers.

== Published works ==
- The Greatest of These Short fiction published in West Winds: California's Book of Fiction. San Francisco: Paul Elder & Company, 1914
- American Primer. 1931.
- No Life for a Lady. 1941.
- Satan's Paradise: From Lucien Maxwell to Fred Lambert. 1952.

There are collections of Morley Cleaveland's papers at the University of New Mexico and New Mexico State University libraries.
