= Julia Duncan Brown Asplund =

American university librarian

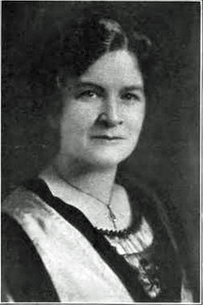
- Born: Julia Duncan Brown; October 6, 1875; Palmyra, Missouri
- Died: July 26, 1958 (aged 82); Pasadena, California
- Occupations: Librarian, Clubwoman
- Spouse: Rupert Franz Asplund (m. 1905)

Julia Duncan Brown Asplund (October 6, 1875 – July 26, 1958) was the first librarian for the University of New Mexico and the first woman to serve on the University of New Mexico Board of Regents.

== Biography ==
Asplund née Brown was born on October 6, 1875, in Palmyra, Missouri. Asplund demonstrated an early interest in politics and women's issues, writing to a friend at the age of 15, "I am very strong for women's rights, you know. I think I shall become a second Susan B. Anthony." She was educated at the Drexel Institute of Library Sciences in Philadelphia, graduating in 1901.

In 1903 she went to Albuquerque to organize the Territorial University's library. In 1905 she married fellow faculty member Rupert Asplund, with whom she had one child. The family moved to Santa Fe in 1909. Around that time Asplund turned her attention towards establishing a system of free traveling libraries in New Mexico. In 1911 she joined the New Mexico Federation of Women’s Clubs (NMFWC) and served on the library extension committee almost continually through 1929. Between 1914 and 1916 she was the president of the New Mexico Federation of Women's Clubs. A leader in the suffrage movement in New Mexico, she wrote in an editorial for "The Outlook" in 1927, "...we have found the suffrage of great assistance to women in speeding up the program of welfare work which was started by their organizations more than ten years ago...we knew exactly what we wanted and we got it. More than that, we are using it and we expect to go on using it..."

Asplund was the first librarian for the University of New Mexico and the first woman regent of the University of New Mexico, serving from 1921 to 1923. She chaired the New Mexico State Library Commission from 1941 through 1954. In 1920, a month after New Mexico ratified the 19th Amendment to the United States Constitution, extending suffrage to women, Julia Brown Asplund was nominated for governor as part of an all-female ticket selected by the New Mexico Woman's Party. Asplund declined the nomination, however, in favor of an appointment to the Republican State Central Committee. She later served as the Director of the State Library Agency from 1929 to 1932 and 1941 to 1954.

She was a member of numerous civic organizations and social clubs, including the New Mexico Commission on Welfare of Women and Children, Commissioner of Management Santa Fe Public Library, the Santa Fe Woman's Club, and the Daughters of the American Revolution.

Asplund died on July 26, 1958, in Pasadena, California.

Asplund was one of six New Mexican suffragists named in a February 2020 memorial bill of the New Mexico legislature titled "Centennial Of 19th Amendment", along with Laura E. Frenger, Nina Otero-Warren, Ina Sizer Cassidy, Deane Lindsey, and Aurora Lucero.
