= List of North Carolina suffragists =

This is a list of North Carolina suffragists, suffrage groups and others associated with the cause of women's suffrage in North Carolina.

== Groups ==
- Congressional Union (CU).
- National Woman's Party (NWP).

== Suffragists ==
- Lillian Exum Clement (1894–1925) – first woman elected to the North Carolina General Assembly and the first woman to serve in any state legislature in the Southern United States.
- T. Adelaide Goodno (1858–1931) – suffragist; president, North Carolina Woman's Christian Temperance Union.
- Ella St. Clair Thompson (1870–1944).
