= Gerald Cassidy (artist) =

American painter

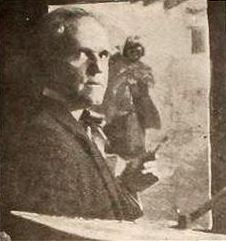
- Cassidy in 1920
- Born: Ira Dymond Gerald Cassidy; November 10, 1869; Covington, Kentucky
- Died: February 12, 1934 (aged 64); Santa Fe, New Mexico
- Resting place: Fairview Cemetery (Santa Fe, New Mexico)
- Education: Art Student's League of New York; National Academy of Design
- Known for: Painting, lithography
- Spouse: Ina Sizer Cassidy
- Patrons: Edgar Lee Hewett

Gerald Cassidy (November 10, 1869 – February 12, 1934) was an early 20th-century artist, muralist, and designer who lived in Santa Fe, New Mexico.

== Biography ==
Cassidy was born in Covington, Kentucky, on November 10, 1869, as Ira Dymond Gerald Cassidy. His parents were Edwin B. Cassidy and Olive E. Cassidy, née Crouch. He studied art at the Institute of Mechanical Arts under Frank Duveneck, and the Art Students League in New York.

At the same moment that Cassidy was first finding success, he contracted a life-threatening case of pneumonia and was moved to a sanitarium in Albuquerque in 1890. It was here that he first saw the people and places of the American Southwest, the subject matter that he would dedicate his entire life's work to after this point. His first work using American Indian and Western subjects was heavily art deco, and a deco edge would remain in his work even as it developed into a more solidly realist style.

Cassidy moved from Albuquerque to Denver to work as a lithographer. In 1912 he moved and settled in Santa Fe, New Mexico where he met Edgar L. Hewett, founding director of the Museum of New Mexico. Hewett commissioned him to paint his first mural at the Panama-California International Exposition. He painted the Navajo in works that were primarily transferred to postcards or posters. At the 1915 Panama-California International Exposition in San Diego Cassidy was awarded the gold medal for his murals, the largest award he would win in his lifetime. Cassidy also created the mural Dawn of the West and the Parfet Park memorial in Golden, Colorado, where he was an honorary member of the Golden Kiwanis Club.

During the mid-twenties Cassidy traveled in Europe, and his pieces were well thought of by the European public. Pablo Picasso chose one of Cassidy's pieces from a show for inclusion in the Luxembourg Palace in Paris.

He was married twice; first to Sarah Craus Snowden. On January 12, 1910, he married Perlina Sizer Davis.

He died on February 12, 1934, as a result of turpentine and carbon monoxide poisoning from a newly installed natural gas heater in his studio while working on a mural art project for the dome of the federal building at Santa Fe.

== Art collections ==
Cassidy's art can be seen at the New Mexico Museum of Art, Museum of Fine Arts, Houston, UC Berkeley Bancroft Library, Smithsonian American Art Museum, and the El Paso Museum of Art. His work is also in Santa Fe at the main post office, Bishop's Lodge, and Hotel La Fonda.

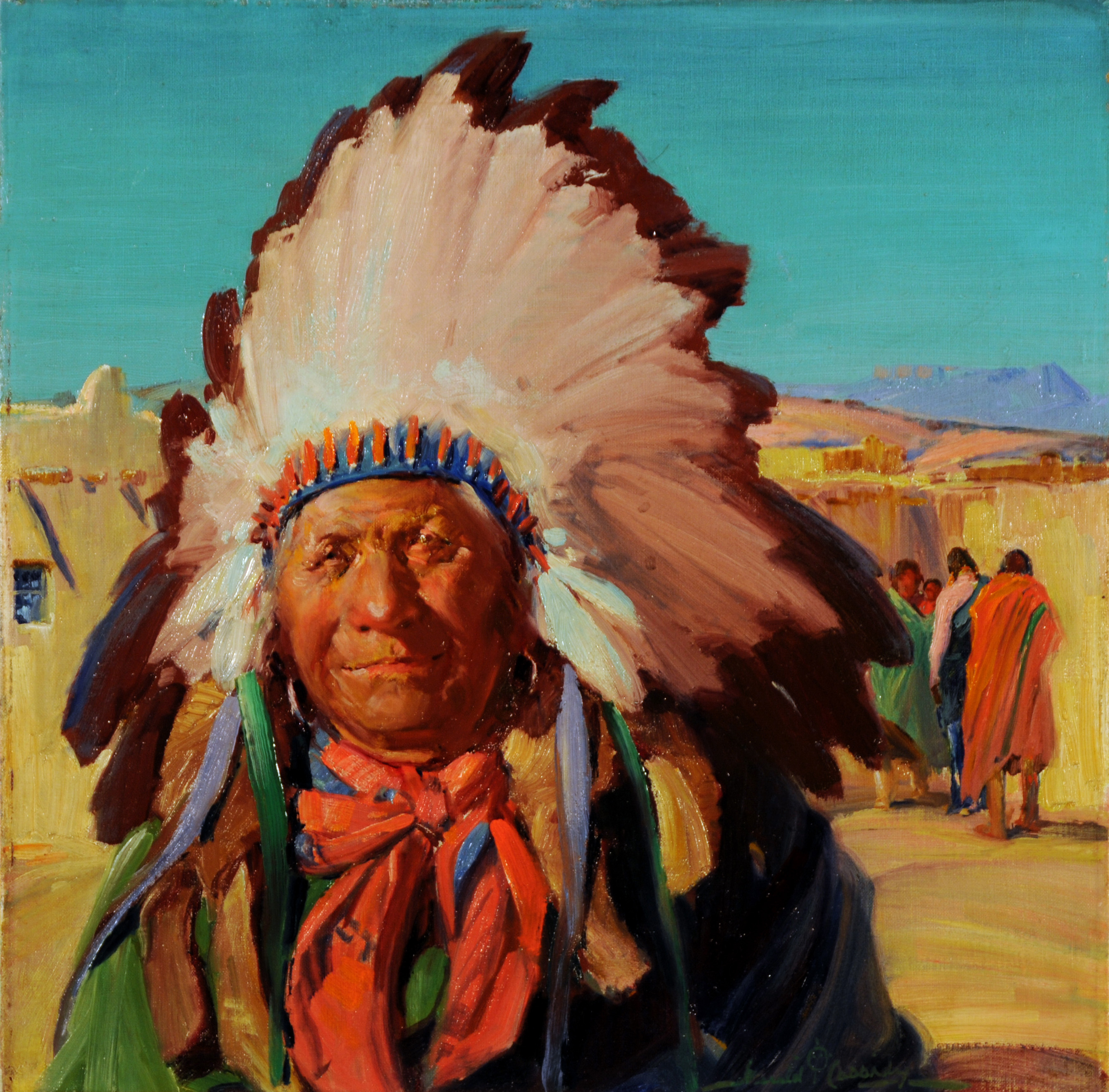
Master of Ceremonies

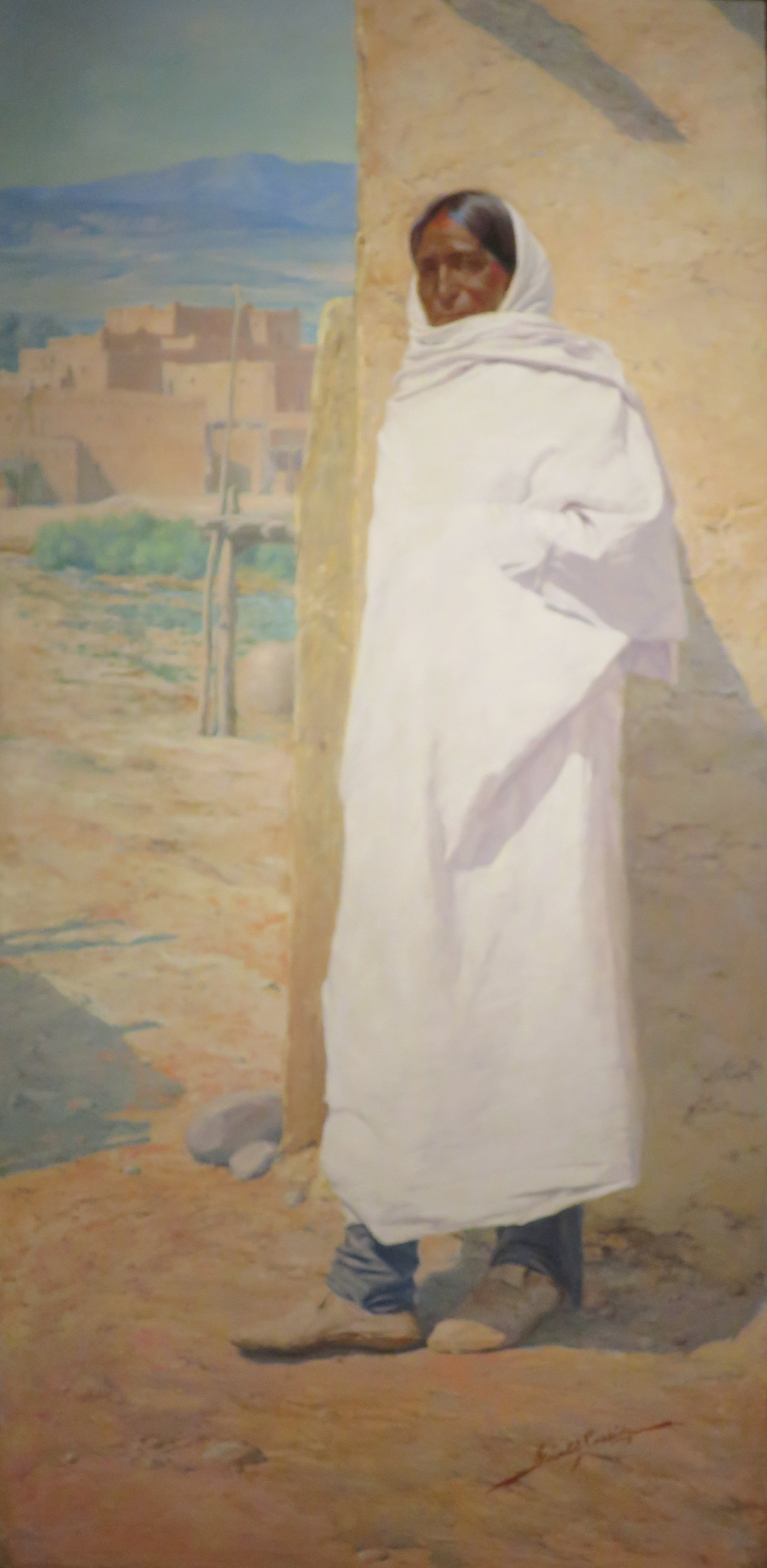
Cui Bono, New Mexico Museum of Art

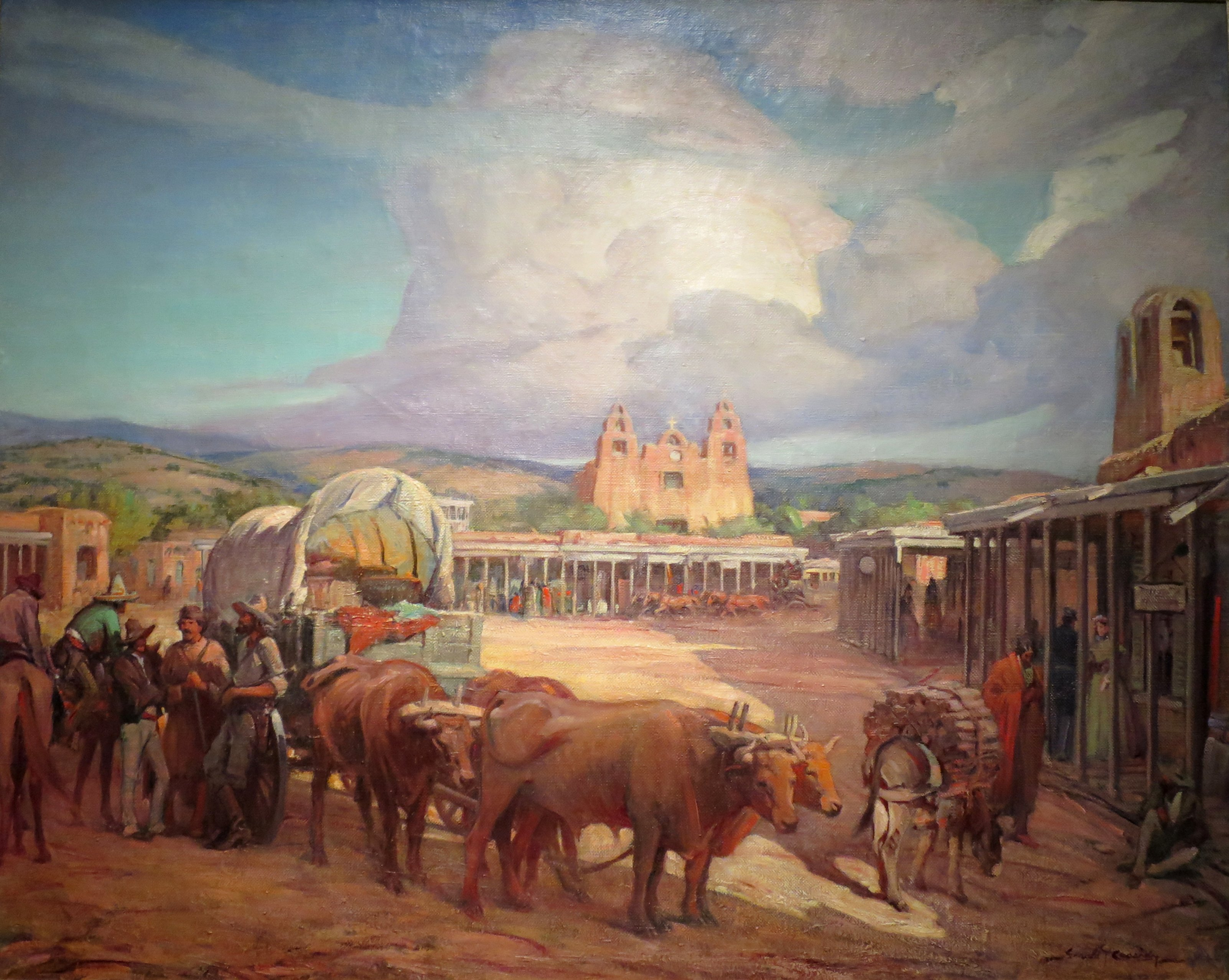
View of the Santa Fe Plaza in the 1850s, New Mexico Museum of Art

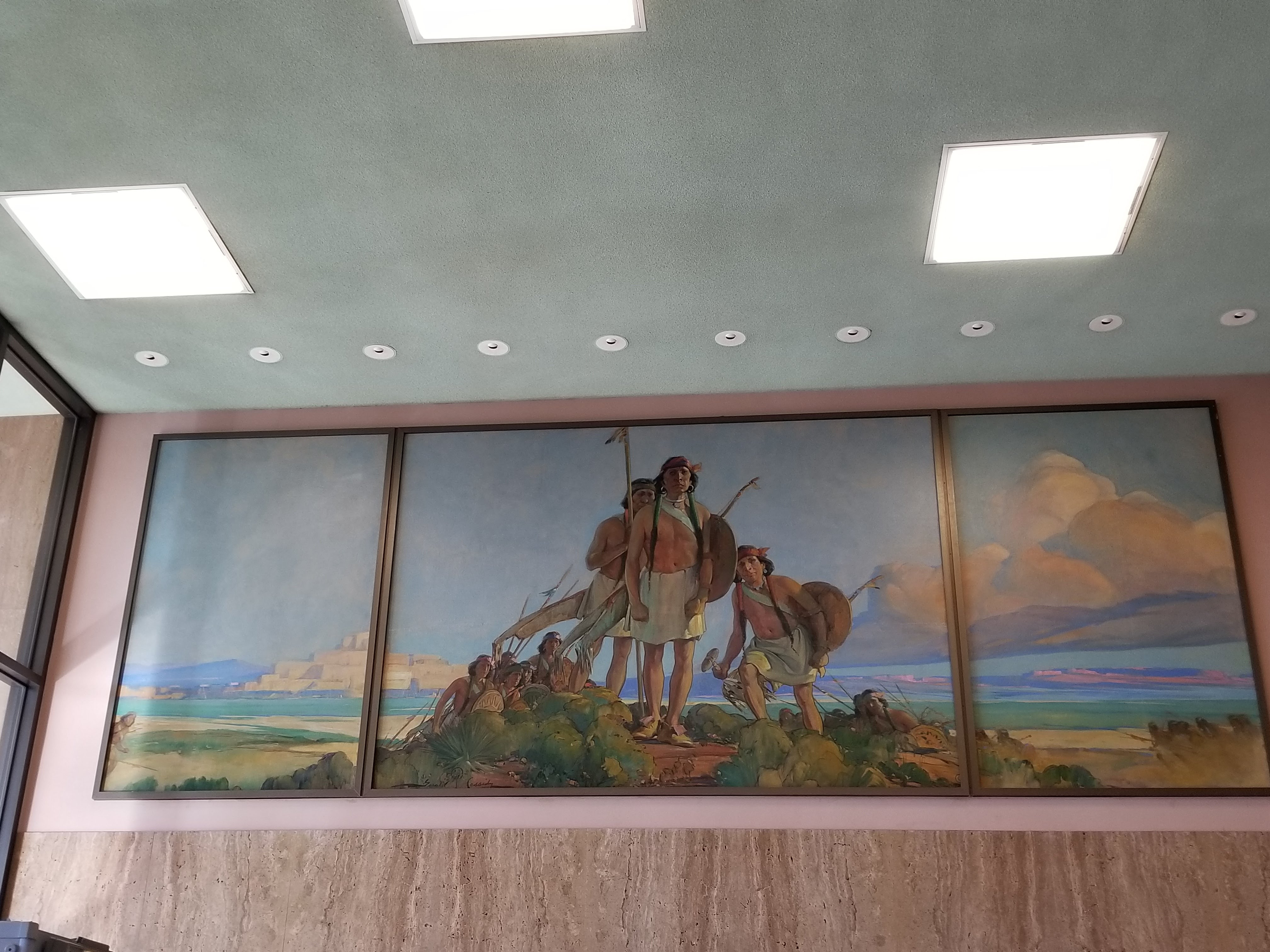
Coronado mural at Santa Fe Post Office

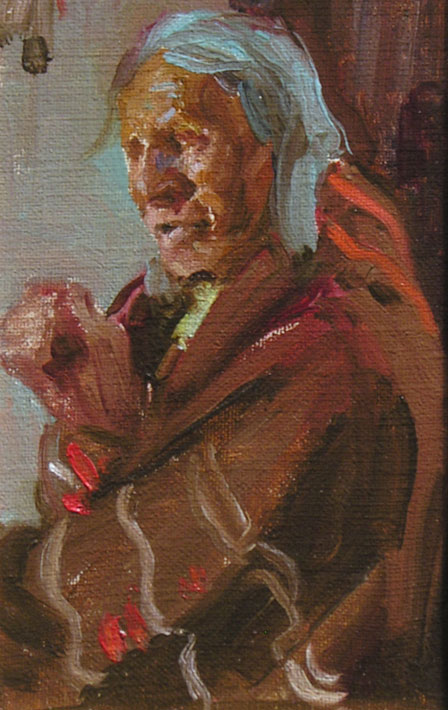
Pueblo Blind Man

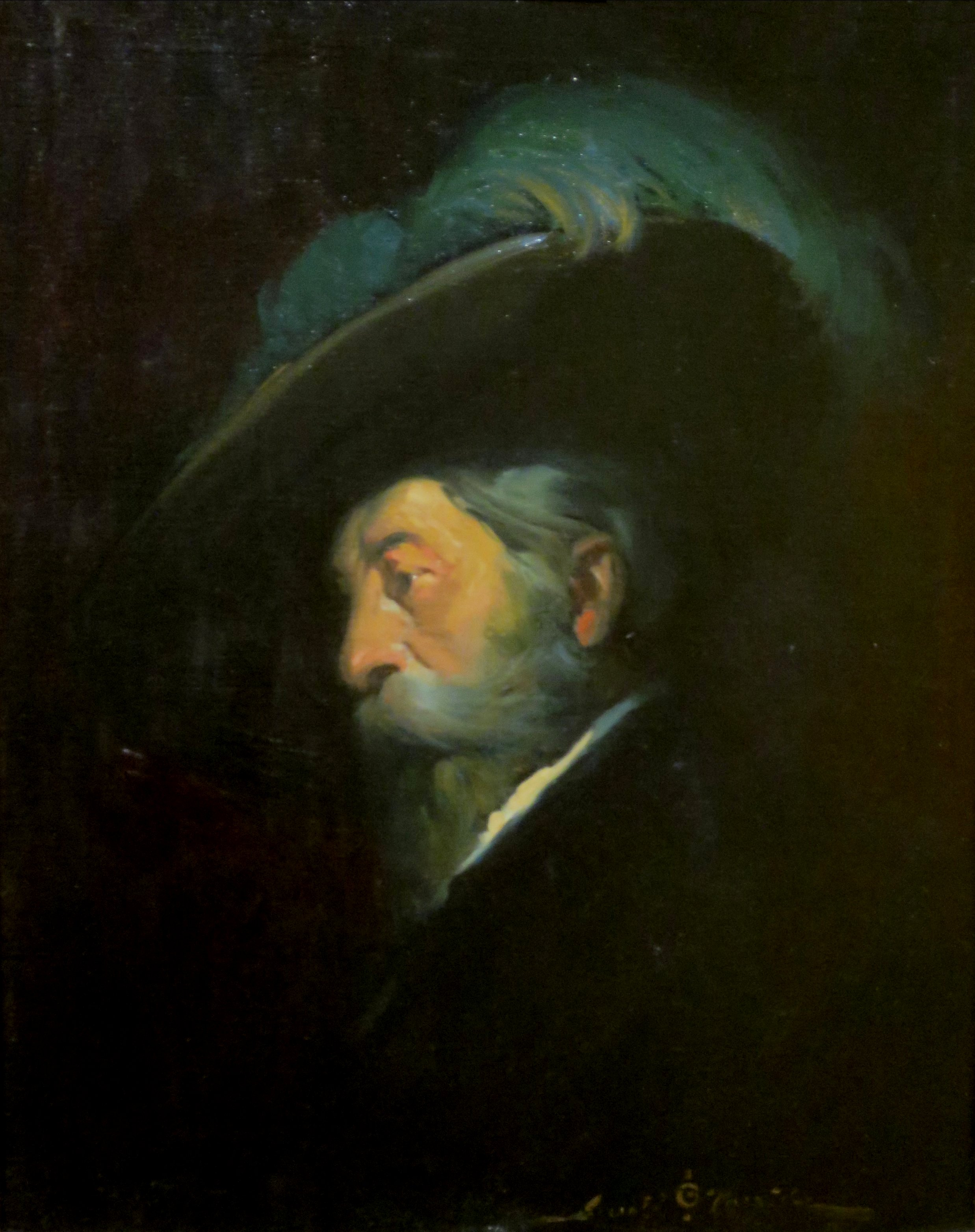
Portrait of Juan Bautista de Anza, El Paso Museum of Art
