= Michael Trujillo =

American physician and director of Indian Health Service (born 1944)

Michael H. Trujillo (born 1944) is an American physician who was the first full-blooded Indigenous person to serve as the director of the Indian Health Service (IHS), a division of the United States Department of Health and Human Services focused on the health of American Indians and Alaskan Natives.

== Biography ==
Michael H. Trujillo was born in 1944, to Ruchanda (née Paisano) and Miguel Trujillo. He and his older sister, Josephine Waconda, were enrolled as members of their mother's tribe, the Pueblo of Laguna. Their father was enrolled at the Pueblo of Isleta.

== Education ==
Trujillo was the first Indigenous person to graduate from the University of New Mexico School of Medicine, where he earned his undergraduate and graduate degrees, including his M.D. and M.S. Trujillo earned a bachelor's degree in biology in 1966, a BA degree in history and political science in 1967, a master's degree in microbiology and biochemistry in 1970, and his MD degree in 1974. He stayed at the University of New Mexico to serve as an intern and a resident in their medical school.

Trujillo earned his M.P.H. at the University of Minnesota School of Public Health in 1984. His medical specialties were family and internal medicine. Trujillo completed a fellowship in preventive medicine in the Department of Internal Medicine at the Mayo Clinic in Rochester, Minnesota.

== Professional Career and Leadership in Public Health ==
After completing his schooling, Trujillo began his career as a physician near the reservation where he grew up in New Mexico, working in an Indian Health Service (IHS) facility. The IHS is dedicated to fulfilling the federal responsibility of providing high quality health services to American Indians and Alaska Natives. In 1993, Trujillo was the first director of the IHS to be selected by President Bill Clinton, and his appointment was confirmed unanimously by the US Senate. In March of 1994, Trujillo was employed as the chief medical officer of the Rockville, Maryland office of the United States Department of Health and Human Services's Indian Health Service (IHS). The appointment made him the first full-blooded American Indian to lead the IHS, and gave him the rank of rear admiral in the Public Health Service Commissioned Corps (PHSCC). Over the course of his time at IHS, he served two four-year terms as the director.

Less than a year after Trujillo's appointment, he presented an opening statement to the chairman and members of the IHS committee to discuss the 1996 budget. In this statement, Trujillo says he wants to "enter a new era of health care delivery and to strengthen the partnership with tribes in determining how those services will be delivered." He states that the mission of the IHS is to "raise the health status of American Indians and Alaska Natives to the highest possible level."

Trujillo believed that to achieve the mission, it was essential to increase the budget for providing care in rural areas. He noted that it was cheaper to provide care in urban areas than in rural areas, and the demand for assistance came primarily from rural regions.

After Trujillo presented his opening statement to the IHS committee, he was granted a "budget expansion of more than $1 billion to tribes and urban Indian programs that exceeded $5 billion and more than 15,000 employees." Trujillo played a crucial role in helping tribes learn to manage their own health care programs through a self governance initiative.

In addition to being the director of the IHS, Trujillo was also an Assistant Surgeon General in the U.S. Public Health Service. He was later appointed to the Office of the Surgeon General in June 2002. Trujillo was "involved in nationwide initiatives to improve health status and disparities in health care of minority and underserved populations."

In 2003, Trujillo became an associate professor in the Department of Family and Community Medicine and associate director at the Regional Cancer Research & Treatment Center at the School of Medicine, University of New Mexico, focusing on minority populations and community outreach programs. Additionally he worked as "the tribal liaison officer for the Office of the Director at the Albuquerque VA Regional Medical Center", where he evaluated veterans for disabilities and compensation as an outpatient clinician.

Trujillo also held a position in the Department of Internal Medicine as the associate dean for the Outreach & Multicultural Affairs program at the University of Arizona College of Medicine – Phoenix. Simultaneously, he worked as a part time consultant for the Translational Genomics Research Institute from 2006 to 2008. His goal was to help the development of "applied community-based participatory research partnerships that [would] not only increase scientific understanding of the genetic basis of disease, but also lead to improvements in clinical care and treatment." Trujillo aimed to enhance Indigenous health care and frequently studied methods to improve the health of cancer patients.

From November 2008 until June 2010, Trujillo served as the health research director at the Inter Tribal Council of Arizona. In this role, he oversaw and coordinated a variety of healthcare initiatives, projects and grants. He also contributed to strengthening partnerships with various "federal, non-federal, state, community, and Indigenous tribal organizations and programs, especially dealing with National Cancer Institute/National Institutes of Health cancer initiatives."
