= Josephine Waconda =

American nurse and administrator (1935–2013)

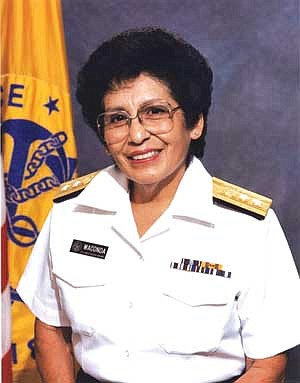
- Born: Josephine Trujillo; February 5, 1935; Paraje Village, Laguna Pueblo, New Mexico
- Died: January 1, 2013 (aged 77); Corona, New Mexico
- Other names: Josephine T. Waconda, Josephine Trujillo Waconda
- Education: Regina School of Nursing; University of New Mexico
- Occupations: Nurse, nurse administrator
- Years active: 1955–2013
- Children: 4
- Father: Miguel Trujillo

Josephine Waconda (née Trujillo; February 5, 1935 – January 1, 2013) was an American nurse and an administrator of the Indian Health Service. She was a member of Pueblo of Laguna tribe and the first Native American to attain the rank of rear admiral of the Public Health Service Commissioned Corps (PHSCC), when she was promoted in 1987 to head the regional Albuquerque office of the Indian Health Service.

Raised in the Paraje Village of the Laguna Pueblo, in New Mexico to parents who were teachers, Waconda earned her nursing degree from the Regina School of Nursing of St. Joseph Hospital in Albuquerque, New Mexico. She worked in public and private hospitals until 1975, when she was chosen to participate in a federal nurse practitioner program. She graduated from the University of New Mexico in 1976 as the first Indigenous woman earn the designation of certified nurse practitioner at the University. She went to work for the Indian Health Service, serving rural areas around Albuquerque. In 1987, she became the director of the Albuquerque office of the Indian Health Service, overseeing the service's operations in four states. Her position made her an Assistant Surgeon General of the United States and a one-star flag officer with the rank of rear admiral in the PHSCC.

Waconda founded the first regional treatment programs in the Indian Health Service to treat diabetics and substance abuse, among many other initiatives. She coordinated the national program to standardize health care in the Indian Health Service for women. In addition to her work for the Albuquerque office, she also served on the state Health Policy Advisory and American Indian Health Advisory Committees. After her retirement from nursing, in 1997, she operated a cattle ranch in Corona, New Mexico with her husband. From 2003 to 2013 she was president of the New Mexico Native American Nurses Association. She received many awards and honors. Among them, she was designated a nursing legend by the New Mexico Center for Nursing Excellence in 2004 and Pueblo Woman of the Year in 2008.

== Early life and education ==
Josephine Trujillo was born on February 5, 1935, in the Paraje Village of the Laguna Pueblo, in New Mexico to Ruchanda (née Paisano) and Miguel Trujillo. Both of her parents had been educated at Haskell Institute, one of the American Indian boarding schools. Her father was born and was a member of the Pueblo of Isleta community, while her mother was a member of the Pueblo of Laguna community. Trujillo and her brother Michael were enrolled as members of the Pueblo of Laguna. Miguel was a teacher and social worker, who served in the Marines between 1942 and 1945, and challenged his inability to vote in because he lived on a reservation, which the state of New Mexico prohibited. The state constitution forbade Indigenous people living on "untaxed land" from registering to vote, but Trujillo argued that he paid other federal, local, and state taxes and as a citizen should be able to vote. He won a landmark federal decision in 1948, which struck down as unconstitutional, the part of the New Mexico Constitution that forbade Native people living on reservations from voting. Ruchanda taught school at a facility run by the Bureau of Indian Affairs. Ulysses Grant Paisano, Ruchanda's father served as Laguna Pueblo tribal governor in the 1930s.

In 1953, Trujillo participated in the capping ceremony, a pledge of dedication to the nursing profession, at the Regina School of Nursing of St. Joseph Hospital in Albuquerque, New Mexico. She graduated with her nursing degree in 1955 from the Regina School of Nursing. The following year, she married John E. Waconda and the couple raised four children together: Patricia, Karen, John Jr. and Lawrence.

== Career ==
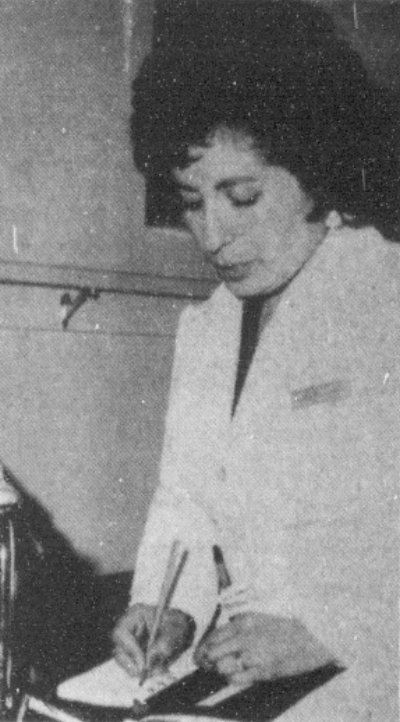
Waconda in 1975

Throughout the 1960s, Waconda worked at private hospitals. In 1975, she was chosen among the first eight registered nurses to participate in a program funded by the US Department of Health, Education and Welfare at the University of New Mexico to train as a nurse practitioner for the Indian Health Service. The goal of the program was to give the nurses the training to manage health and emergency services for people and families living in rural areas that did not have other access to health services. Completing her schooling in January 1976, she became the first Indigenous woman to graduate as a certified nurse practitioner (CNP) from the University of New Mexico. She was commissioned as an officer in the Public Health Service Commissioned Corps (PHSCC), and was assigned to work at the Isleta Pueblo and in areas around Albuquerque.

Waconda was promoted as director of the regional Indian Health Service office in Albuquerque in 1987. The position made her an Assistant Surgeon General of the United States, which carried the rank of rear admiral in the PHSCC, making her the first Native American to achieve the rank and be designated as a one star flag officer. Her duties including managing the Indian Health Service for four states which included two Apache tribes, three Navajo tribes, twenty pueblo communities, and two Ute tribes, as well as overseeing five hospitals and twenty other health facilities in her region. Among the programs she founded were the first diabetes and wellness programs in the Indian Health service, teen clinics, and regional child abuse- and suicide-prevention teams. She secured accreditation from the Joint Commission on Accreditation of Healthcare Organizations for medicaid contracts for the first regional treatment center of the Indian Health Service and created a Women's Health Task Force to coordinate care standards for all facilities the national program. In 1994, her brother Michael became the first full-blooded Native American director of the Indian Health Service, making Waconda and he, the "only flag-ranked brother and sister in any U.S. commissioned officers' corps", according to William Claiborne of The Washington Post, although he received two stars.

Among her other activities, Waconda worked to ensure that her father's legacy was not lost. He had a stroke in 1980, and she became his spokesperson and the caretaker of his legacy as a civil rights activist. She was appointed in 1989 to serve as one of 16 members appointed to the Governor's Health Policy Advisory Committee to provide input on a ten-year state health plan. Waconda retired in 1997, and she and her husband operated a 70-acre cattle ranch near the Pueblo of Isleta, in Corona, New Mexico. She was elected president of the New Mexico Native American Nurses Association in 2003, and served for a decade. She was honored as a nursing legend by the New Mexico Center for Nursing Excellence in 2004. Three years later, she was appointed to the state's American Indian Health Advisory Committee. She was honored as the Pueblo Woman of the Year in 2008, by the Indian Pueblo Cultural Center at Santa Fe, New Mexico in honor of Women's History Month.

== Death and legacy ==
Waconda died on January 1, 2013, at her home and was buried on January 7 at the Santa Fe National Cemetery. She is remembered for contributions to nursing and the Indian Health Service. Her son, John Waconda became the first Native American Partnerships Program director of The Nature Conservancy in 2021.
