= Bill Morley =

American football player, coach, and rancher (1876–1932)

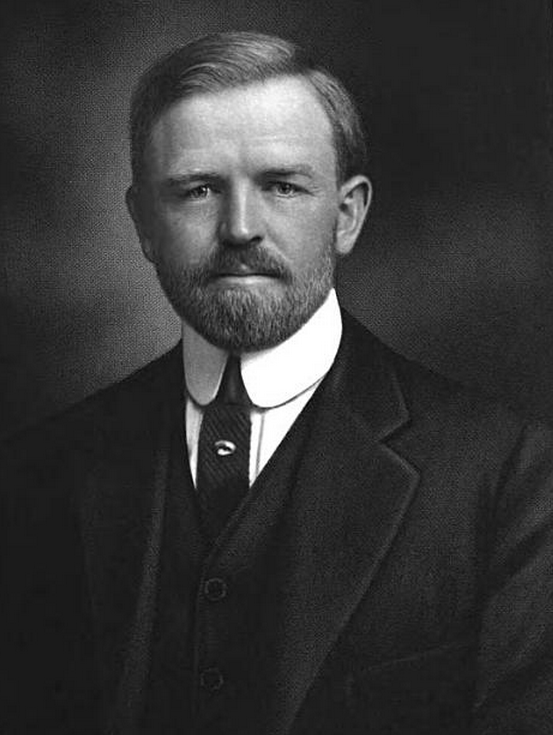

Biographical details
- Born: March 17, 1876; Cimarron, New Mexico, U.S.
- Died: May 27, 1932 (aged 56); Pasadena, California, U.S.

Playing career
- 1895: Michigan
- 1899–1901: Columbia
- Positions: Halfback, quarterback

Coaching career (HC unless noted)
- 1902–1905: Columbia

Head coaching record
- Overall: 26–11–3

Accomplishments and honors

Awards
- 2× Consensus All-American (1900, 1901); Second-team All-American (1899)
- College Football Hall of Fame; Inducted in 1971 (profile)

William Raymond Morley Jr. (March 17, 1876 – May 27, 1932) was an American college football player, coach, and rancher. Born in New Mexico, he played football at the University of Michigan and Columbia University and was selected as an All-American in 1900 and 1901. Morley served as the head coach of the Columbia Blue and White football team from 1902 to 1905. He later returned to New Mexico where he was a successful cattle and sheep rancher. He was posthumously inducted into the College Football Hall of Fame as a player in 1971.

== Early years ==
Morley was born in 1876 at Cimarron in Colfax County, New Mexico. His parents were William Raymond Morley Sr., and Ada (McPherson) Morley. His father was the chief engineer for the Santa Fe Railroad and later edited The Cimarron News and managed the Maxwell land grant in Cimarron. Morley's father was killed in 1883 from an accidental shooting in Mexico. Morley was six years old at the time of his father's death. His father left extensive land holdings in the Datil Mountains near Datil, New Mexico. After his father's death, his mother remarried, and moved with her three young children (one boy and two girls) and her new husband, Floyd Jarrett, to the Datil Mountains. Jarrett abandoned the family in approximately 1889, and Morley's mother raised her children in a log house roofed with adobe sod. Morley's sister, Agnes Morley Cleaveland, later wrote a best-selling book titled "No Life for a Lady" about their life in the Datil Mountains.

== Football player ==
Morley was sent east to be educated and reportedly attended school in 18 states. He received a civil engineering degree from the Pennsylvania Military Academy in Chester, Pennsylvania. He first played football at the military academy.

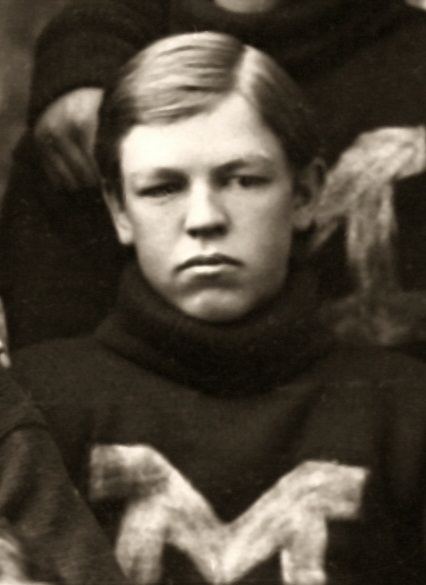
Morley at age 19 as a member of the 1895 Michigan football team

Morley later attended the University of Michigan where he received a Bachelor of Science degree in 1896. While attending Michigan, he was the backup quarterback on the 1895 Michigan Wolverines football team that laid claim to the Western football championship. He was five feet, six inches tall and weighed 147 pounds as a football player at Michigan. Morley's sister, Agnes, was also a student at Michigan during the 1895–96 academic year. After graduating from Michigan, Morely worked for the Santa Fe Railroad. Some reports indicate that he also worked for a time as the sheriff of Socorro County, New Mexico.

Morley subsequently enrolled at Columbia University School of Mines. He played at the halfback and quarterback positions for the Columbia Blue and White football teams in 1899, 1900 and 1901. He was selected as a first-team All-American in 1900 by Walter Camp and Leslie's Weekly. Caspar Whitney, owner and editor-in-chief of the monthly Outing magazine, chose Morley as the captain and first-team halfback for his 1901 College Football All-America Team. In his review of the 1901 football season, Charles Edward Patterson wrote: "Morley, stocky, muscular, not to be denied his two yards help or no help (and three times two means six, or a first down, you know!) able to repeat indefinitely, the best interferer in present day football, a forty yard punter and a drop-kicker who can actually score." In 1905, The New York Times recalled Morley's playing style at Columbia: "Morley was one of the most aggressive men who ever represented Columbia on the gridiron. As a plunging back he made an enviable reputation, and the same was true when he played quarter back."

Morley was posthumously inducted into the College Football Hall of Fame in 1971. Morley's Hall of Fame biography emphasizes his accomplishments as a player for Columbia: "The Columbia backfield of 1899 could strike from every position, often with electrifying results. It was that backfield which became the first Lion squad to beat Yale, and the 5–0 victory over the Elis was carried off through the efforts of this Hall of Famer, Bill Morley. Morley's exciting gains and devastating blocks took the heart out of the Eli defense."

== Coaching career ==
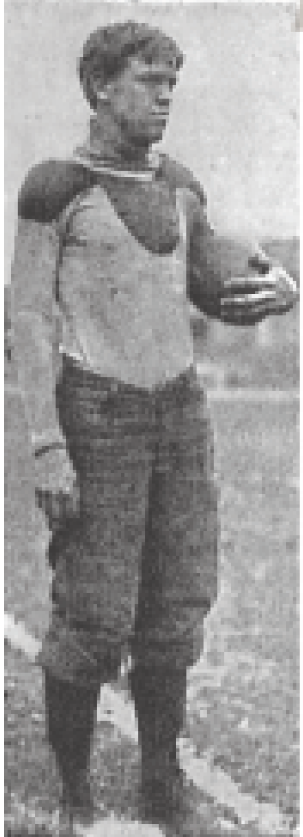
Morley at Columbia, 1899

In February 1902, Morley was hired as the head football coach at Columbia. During the 1903 season, Morley's team began the season with seven consecutive shutouts and finished with a 9–1 record, outscoring opponents 148–43. He served as Columbia's head football coach from 1902 to 1905. Morley compiled an overall record of 26–11–3 as the head coach at Columbia.

== Cattle and sheep rancher ==
Morley later returned to New Mexico where he operated an extensive cattle and sheep ranch at Datil, New Mexico, known as the "Drag A ranch." Morley reportedly owned 200 sections of 640 acres each and "controlled several times that number because of control of watering places, and additional sections under Forest Service permits." Morley was one of the leading figures in western New Mexico. He was reported to be a "story teller of no mean ability," a skilled hunter, and "a hated foe of cattle rustlers." An account published in the Albuquerque Journal described him as follows:

"He was a man of picturesque appearance with a reddish beard that he wore in styles to suit his whim. Three years ago [1929], in an effort to procure aid for New Mexico livestock men who had lost heavily in the postwar period, he let his hair grow to his shoulders and his beard to his waist, and marched in the inaugural parade at Washington, where he attracted wide attention and publicity."

Morley was one of the founders of the New Mexico Cattle Growers Association. He also owned several properties and business in Magdalena, New Mexico, and was the president and one of the principal shareholders of the First National Bank of Magadalena.

== Family and death ==
Morley was married to Bessie Crason, with whom he had a son William Raymond Morley III (born 1902). Morley was remarried to Nancy Brown in 1908. They had three daughters, named Margaratta Hope, Milicent Faith and Love (sometimes referred to as Faith, Hope and Love), born on December 25, 1908. Love died in infancy, and Hope died in approximately 1910. At the time of the 1910 United States census, Morley was living in Datil, New Mexico, with his wife, Nancy (age 27), and their two surviving daughters (age 1). His occupation was listed as a cattle rancher. In a September 1918 draft registration card, Morley indicated that he was living in Datil and employed in the cattle and sheep ranching business. At the time of the 1920 United States census, Morley was living at Santa Rita, New Mexico, with his wife Nancy (age 40) and their daughter Milicent Faith Morley (age 11). His occupation was listed as a farmer on a general farm. At the time of the 1930 United States census, Morley was living in Datil with his wife Nancy B. Morley (age 53) and a daughter, M. Faith Morley (age 21). His occupation was listed as stock raising on a stock ranch. Morley's nephew, Norman Cleaveland, won a gold medal in rugby at the 1924 Summer Olympics.

In approximately 1930, Morley moved to Pasadena, California. He was forced to move to a lower altitude due to heart disease. Morley died from heart disease in May 1932. He suffered a "severe attack" while at his home in Pasadena. He lived for a week after the attack, though he did not regain consciousness.

== Head coaching record ==
Year	Team	Overall	Conference	Standing	Bowl/playoffs
Columbia Blue and White (Independent) (1902–1905)
1902	Columbia	6–4–1			
1903	Columbia	9–1			
1904	Columbia	7–3			
1905	Columbia	4–3–2			
Columbia:		26–11–3			
Total:		26–11–3			
