= Harrison v. Laveen =

Arizona Supreme Court decision that supported Native American suffrage

- Court: Arizona Supreme Court
- Decided: July 15, 1948
- Citation: 67 Ariz. 337, 196 P.2d 456

Case opinions
- Decision by: Levi Stewart Udall
- Concurrence: Rawghlie Clement Stanford; Arthur T. LaPrade
- Dissent: none

Keywords
- Indigenous rights; Native Americans; Racial discrimination; Voting rights

Harrison v. Laveen, 67 Ariz. 337, 196 P.2d 456 (1948), also referred to Harrison et al. v. Laveen and Harrison and Austin v. Laveen, was a court case decided before the Arizona Supreme Court, the highest state court of the U.S. state of Arizona, in 1948. The plaintiffs were members of the Fort McDowell Yavapai Nation who were prevented from registering to vote. The court decision overturned an earlier decision by the court that American Indians were ineligible to vote, resulting in the suffrage of native peoples in Arizona. Other voting obstacles such as literacy tests and language barriers continued to exist, preventing a majority of American Indians in Arizona from voting.

== Background ==
The Arizona Supreme Court had ruled shortly after the passage of the Indian Citizenship Act in 1924 that American Indians were ineligible to vote. The 1928 ruling in Porter v. Hall stated that natives were "persons under guardianship"; section 2, article 7 of the Constitution of Arizona said that such persons were ineligible to vote. A 1947 report by the US government noted that: "In past years, American Indians have also been denied the right to vote and other political rights in a number of states. Most of these restrictions have been abandoned, but in two states, New Mexico and Arizona, Indians continue to be disenfranchised."

Frank Harrison was a World War II veteran who lived in the Fort McDowell Yavapai Nation in Arizona, and Harry Austin was the chairman of the tribe. In 1947, Harrison and Austin went to the registrar's office in Maricopa County to attempt to register to vote. They were denied registration by the county recorder Roger G. Laveen, who cited the earlier decision that said American Indians were "persons under guardianship" and ineligible to vote in elections.

== Court decisions ==
Austin and Harrison filed suit against Laveen in the Maricopa County superior court. Laveen filed a motion to dismiss the complaint, which was granted by the court.

Harrison and Austin filed an appeal to the Arizona Supreme Court against the county court decision to dismiss the complaint. They were represented by Richard F. Harless, Lemuel P. Mathews, and Ben B. Mathews. Laveen was represented by the Maricopa County Attorney Francis J. Donofrio and the Deputy Attorney Warren L. McCarthy. Amici curiae were filed by the American Civil Liberties Union, United States federal government, and National Congress of American Indians. On July 15, 1948, the Arizona Supreme Court unanimously overturned the superior court's decision, saying that the "persons under guardianship" phrasing in the state constitution applied only to judicial guardianship, and that the phrase "has no application to the plaintiffs or to the Federal status of Indians in Arizona as a class".

== Aftermath ==
The overturn of Porter v. Hall meant that American Indians in Arizona had de jure suffrage. However, similar to the voting history of other minority groups in the US, other barriers prevented many from voting. Many natives in Arizona did not speak English, and thus could not access voting resources or pass English-language literacy tests. In 1948 it was estimated that 80–90% of Arizona Indians were illiterate and thus could not vote until literacy tests were made illegal in the 1970 Amendment to the Voting Rights Act.

== See also ==
- Miguel Trujillo, a plaintiff in Trujillo v. Garley where American Indians won the right to vote in New Mexico
- Native American civil rights
