= Miguel Trujillo =

Miguel H. Trujillo (1904–1989) was an American activist from Isleta Pueblo, who was instrumental to the case Trujillo v. Garley in 1948; before the case, New Mexico, like many other states, had a ruling that "Indians not taxed" were not legally allowed to vote. With the case Miguel successfully challenged this ruling.

== Early life ==
Miguel H. Trujillo was born on April 30, 1904, at the Pueblo of Isleta, in New Mexico to Juanita (née Jaramillo) and José Trujillo. José was a farmer, but died when Trujillo was seven years old, leaving Juanita to raise their four children. Both Trujillo and his older brother, Manuel, known as "Bob", took odd jobs to help until they were old enough to go to school. He attended the Albuquerque Indian School until the tenth grade and then went to high school at the Haskell Institute in Lawrence, Kansas. Eventually, he earned a bachelor's degree from the University of New Mexico.

He went on to serve in the US Marines during World War II.

== Family ==
Trujillo married to Ruchanda Paisano and had two children who both went into the field of medicine, a daughter, Josephine Waconda, and a son, Michael Trujillo, the director of the Indian Health Service under President Bill Clinton.

== Native American vote in New Mexico ==
Prior to 1948, Native Americans living in New Mexico were disenfranchised. It was until after World War II that the returning veteran Miguel Trujillo started a legal and political campaign to advocate for the voice of Native Americans until those rights were extended. Miguel, after returning as a Marine after the war, confronted the harsh reality that although he was a citizen and veteran, he was not allowed to vote in the country in which he had served. Miguel was turned down by the county registrar Eloy Garley when he tried to register. Miguel sued him in the court case of Trujillo v. Garley, decided by a three-judge panel in Albuquerque. At the time, New Mexico, like many other states, had a ruling that "Indians not taxed' were not legally allowed to vote. The case successfully challenged this ruling.

== See also ==
- Harrison v. Laveen
