= Ella St. Clair Thompson =

American suffragist

Ella Clapp Thompson
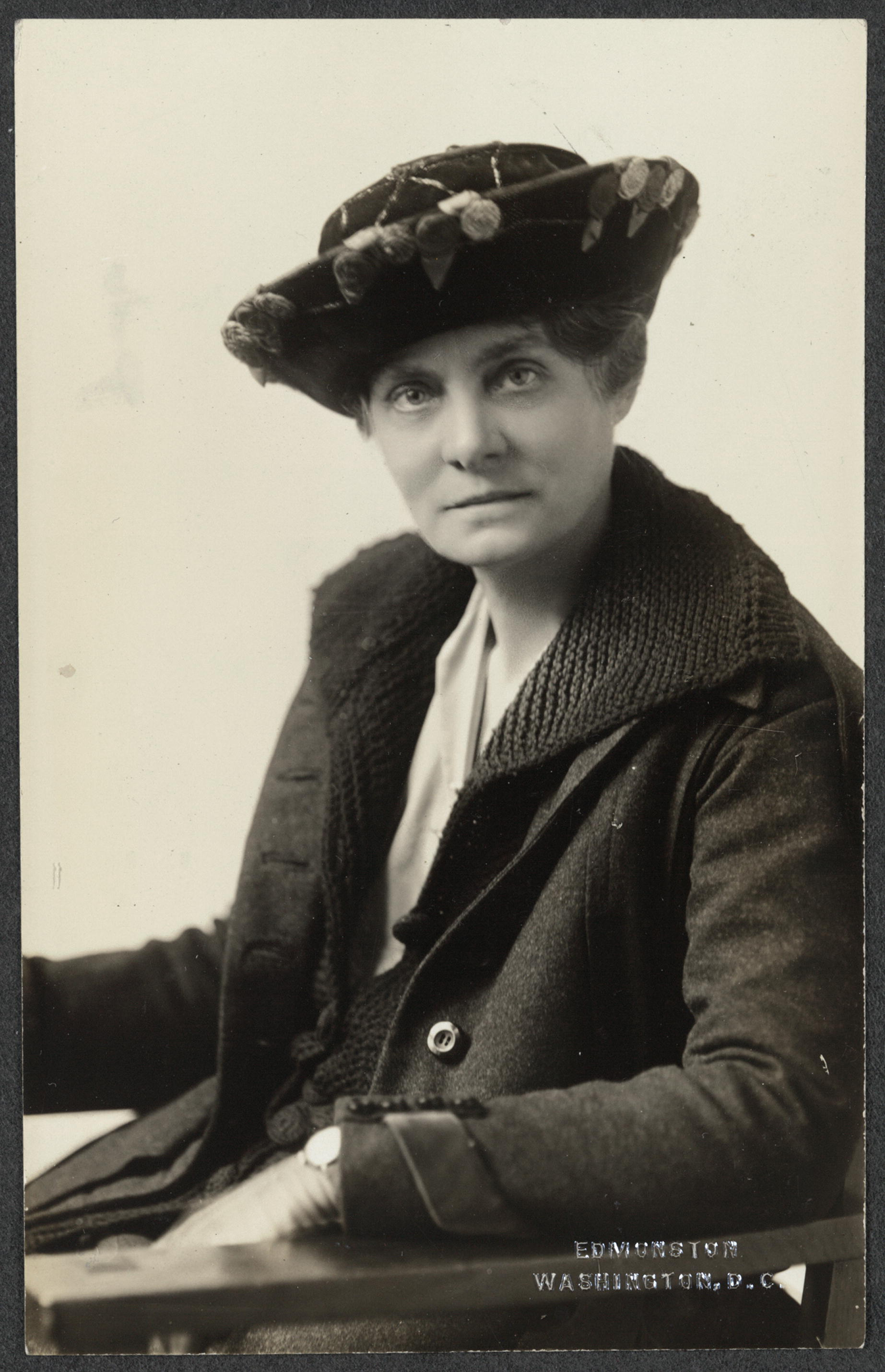
- Born: Ella Bogue Clapp; January 10, 1870; Bakersville, North Carolina, US
- Died: December 17, 1944 (aged 74); Asheville, North Carolina, US
- Occupations: Suffragist, attorney, mica mining company owner
- Spouse: Edwin St. Clair Thompson (m. 1908; died in 1933)

Ella Clapp Thompson (January 10, 1870 – December 17, 1944) was an American suffragist, attorney and mica mining company owner.

== Biography ==
Ella Thompson née Clapp was born on January 10, 1870, in Bakersville, North Carolina. In 1908, she married Edwin St. Clair Thompson. The couple settled in Washington, D.C.

Thompson was an active suffragist. She was a member of the Congressional Union for Woman Suffrage (CUWS), where she served as the North Carolina Field Secretary. In 1915, she traveled to the western states of Arizona, Colorado, New Mexico, and Texas. In New Mexico, Thompson worked with Adelina Otero-Warren to recruit members for a new chapter of the CUWS. The women made a particular effort to recruit Hispanic women to the cause, printing leaflets in Spanish as well as English. In 1916, she traveled to Missouri campaigning for Republican Charles Evans Hughes' failed presidential candidacy. Hughes supported suffrage on a federal level, as an amendment to the U.S. Constitution. In 1917, Thompson traveled with Alice Paul to work on setting up a new branch of the National Woman's Party (NWP).

Thompson was a member of the National Woman's Party, serving as the North Carolina Chair.

In 1918, the Thompsons moved to New York City. The following year, 1919, Ella was arrested outside of the Metropolitan Opera House, demonstrating against Woodrow Wilson on March 5th, along with several other women, then released.

Edwin died in 1933. Ella died in Asheville, North Carolina, on December 17, 1944. Ella was laid to rest with her husband in the Abbey Mausoleum in Arlington County, Virginia. After decades of vandalism and deterioration Abbey Mausoleum was condemned, the bodies removed and reinterred elsewhere, most locally. Both Ella and Edwin were buried at National Memorial Park in Fairfax County, Virginia.

== See also ==
- List of suffragists and suffragettes
- List of North Carolina suffragists
