= Laura E. Frenger =

Laura Eppelsheimer Frenger (1873-1961) was active in club affairs, the first woman in New Mexico to be listed in Who's Who.

== Early life ==
Laura Eppelsheimer was born in St. Louis, Missouri, on April 5, 1873, the daughter of Frank and Laura Eppelsheimer.

== Career ==
Laura E. Frenger was an Executive at the Home Service Secretary of the American Red Cross for eight years.

She organized the New Mexico State Federation of Women's Clubs of which she was life member; she was the General Federation Territorial and State secretary for 11 years; she was the General Federation director from 1916 to 1920; she was assistant chairman of Legislative Department of Women's Clubs (she spearheaded a successful drive for child legislation in New Mexico), she was assistant chairman of the Music Department of Women's Club.

In 1928 she was elected President of the State Federation of Music Clubs.

She was State Chairman of the Atwater Kent Radio Audition; she was president of the Las Cruces Music Club.

She was president of the Woman's Improvement Association of Las Cruces. She was Honorary member of the State College Progress Club.

== Personal life ==
Laura E. Frenger moved to New Mexico in 1899 and lived at 955 N. Alameda Blvd., Las Cruces, New Mexico.

She married George W. Frenger, mayor of Las Cruces and founder of the Chamber of Commerce, and had three children: Reymond, Frank G., Laura Louise.

She died on September 29, 1961, aged 88, and is buried at Masonic Cemetery, Las Cruces.
