= Ina Cassidy =

American writer, sculptor, suffragist, teacher, lecturer

- Born: Perlina Sizer; March 4, 1869; Bent County, Colorado
- Died: September 9, 1965 (aged 96); Santa Fe, New Mexico
- Resting place: Fairview Cemetery (Santa Fe, New Mexico)
- Education: Columbia University
- Known for: Sculpture
- Spouse: Gerald Cassidy

Ina Cassidy (born Perlina Sizer; March 4, 1869 - September 9, 1965) was an American writer, sculptor, suffragist, teacher and lecturer.

== Biography ==
Ina was born Perlina Barnum Sizer in 1869 on a cattle ranch near present-day Las Animas, Colorado to Eber Rockwell Sizer and Mary (née Savage) Sizer. She attended Centennial High School in Pueblo, Colorado.

In 1890, she married John Boyd Davis. He died in Detroit in 1899. Ina attended Columbia University, and became involved in the suffrage movement in New York. She met artist Gerald Cassidy in Denver, Colorado and the two wed in 1912.

The Cassidys moved to Santa Fe, New Mexico soon after marrying and became part of the burgeoning colony of artists and writers. From 1931 to 1960 Ina wrote a monthly column in New Mexico Magazine called "Art and Artists." Ina exhibited her sculptures at the Museum of New Mexico in Santa Fe from 1928 to 1954, and in Albuquerque at the New Mexico State Fair from 1930 to 1953. She served as the New Mexico Director of the Federal Writers' Project from 1935 to 1939, a job she secured after John Collier recommended her appointment. She was active in numerous civic and cultural organizations including the American Indian Defense Association, New Mexico Association on Indian Affairs, the Spanish Colonial Arts Society, the Historical Society of New Mexico, National League of American Pen Women, the Daughters of the American Revolution and Mayflower Society, and was President of the New Mexico Folklore Society. She became a charter member of the National League of Women Voters in New Mexico.

Cassidy died in 1965, aged 96. She was cremated and her ashes are buried next to her late husband in Fairview Cemetery in Santa Fe, New Mexico.
