= Andrieus A. Jones =

American politician (1862–1927)

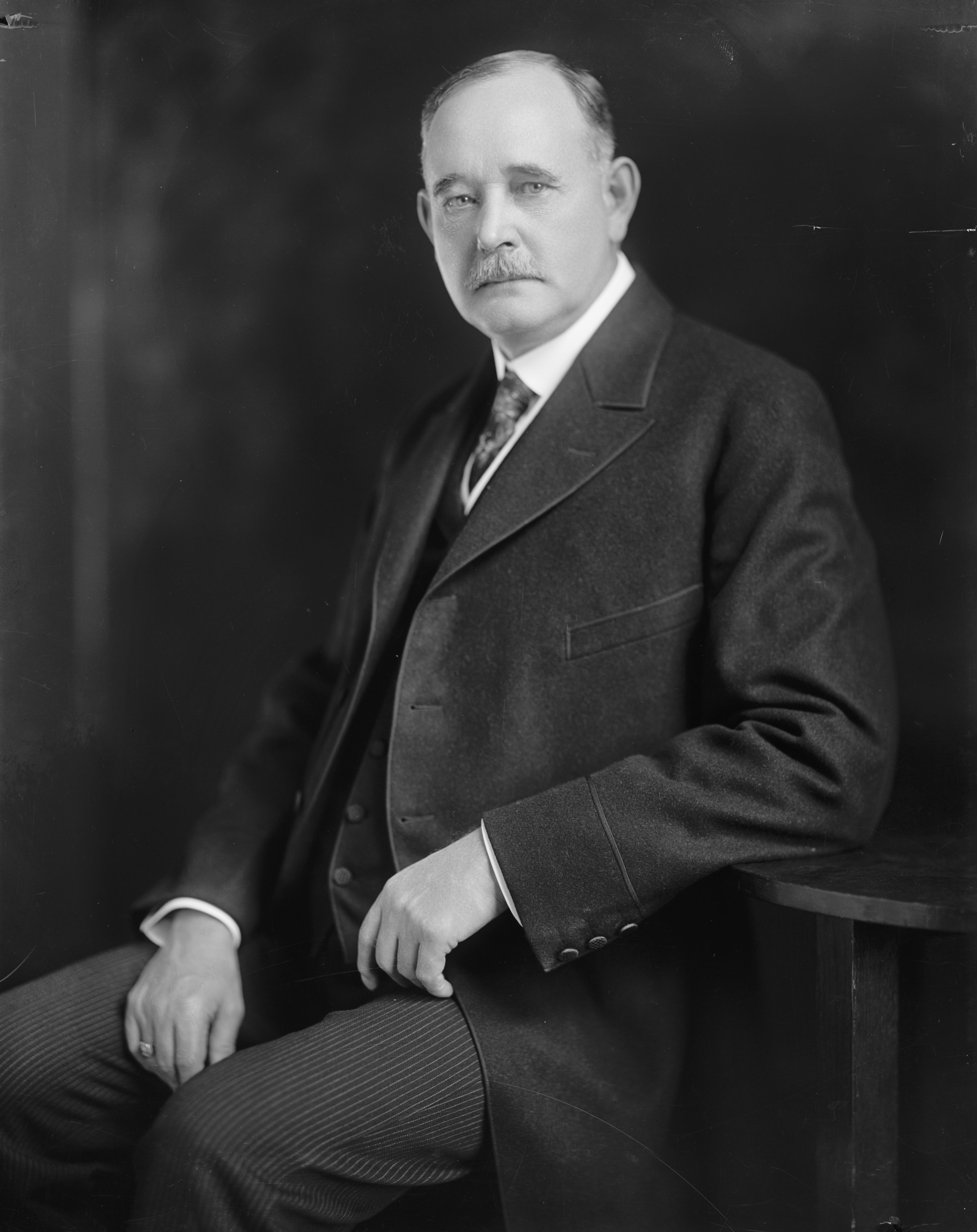
- Jones, 1905–1927

United States Senator from New Mexico
- In office March 4, 1917 – December 20, 1927
- Preceded by: Thomas B. Catron
- Succeeded by: Bronson M. Cutting

Chair of the New Mexico Democratic Party
- In office 1911–1912; 1906–1908

Personal details
- Born: Andrieus Aristieus Jones; May 16, 1862 Obion County, Tennessee
- Died: December 20, 1927 (aged 65) Washington, D.C.
- Party: Democratic
- Spouse: Natalia Stoneroad Jones
- Children: 2
- Education: Valparaiso University
- Profession: Attorney
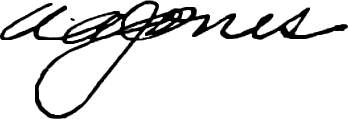
- Signature

Andrieus Aristieus Jones (May 16, 1862 – December 20, 1927) was an American politician in New Mexico who represented the state in the United States Senate from 1917 until his death in 1927.

== Early life and education ==
Jones was born in Obion County, Tennessee, near Union City on May 16, 1862, a son of Rev. James Henry Waldo Jones and Hester Ann Augusta (May) Jones. He was educated in the local schools, attended Bethel College in McKenzie, and graduated from Valparaiso University with a Bachelor of Science degree in 1884, and a Bachelor of Arts in 1885.

== Career ==
After college, Jones taught school in Tennessee before moving to Las Vegas, New Mexico Territory, where he was principal of the public schools from 1885 to 1887. While teaching, Jones studied law. He was admitted to the bar in 1888 and began practice in Las Vegas.

Jones served as president of the Las Vegas Chamber of Commerce, and from 1893 to 1894 he was president of the New Mexico Bar Association. From 1893 to 1894 he served as mayor of Las Vegas. From 1894 to 1898 he was a special United States Attorney. In 1896, Jones was a delegate to the Democratic National Convention.

From 1906 to 1908 and 1911 to 1912, he was chairman of the New Mexico Democratic Party. In 1908, Jones became New Mexico's member of the Democratic National Committee, and he served until 1922. Jones ran unsuccessfully for the Senate in 1912; from 1913 to 1916 he served as the first Assistant Secretary of the Interior.

Jones was elected to the Senate in 1916. He was reelected in 1922 and served from March 4, 1917, until his death. While in Congress he served on the Finance Committee and was chairman of the Committee on Woman Suffrage. As a member of the Committee on Public Lands and Surveys, Jones worked to uncover and publicize the details of the Teapot Dome Scandal.

== Personal life ==
In 1902, Jones married Natalia (Stoneroad) Jones (1871–1933). They had two sons, Vincent and A. A. Jones Jr. Jones died in Washington, D.C., on December 20, 1927. He died in his apartment, and his cause of death was described as angina pectoris. He was buried in the Masonic Cemetery in Las Vegas, New Mexico.

== See also ==
- List of members of the United States Congress who died in office (1900–1949)
- List of mayors of Las Vegas, New Mexico

== Sources ==
=== Books ===
- U.S. Senate (1928). Memorial Addresses: Andrieus A. Jones, Late a Senator from New Mexico. 70th Congress, 1st session. Senate. Doc. 84. Washington, DC: US Government Printing Office – via HathiTrust.

=== Newspapers ===
- "Death Notice, Mrs. Natalie Stoneroad Jones". Las Vegas Daily Optic. February 21, 1933. p. 3 – via Newspapers.com.

Party political offices
First	Democratic nominee for U.S. Senator from New Mexico (Class 1); 1916, 1922	Succeeded by Juan N. Vigil
U.S. Senate
Preceded by Thomas B. Catron	U.S. senator (Class 1) from New Mexico; 1917 – 1927; Served alongside: Albert B. Fall, Holm O. Bursum, Sam G. Bratton	Succeeded by Bronson M. Cutting
