= Thomas B. Catron =

American politician (1840–1921)

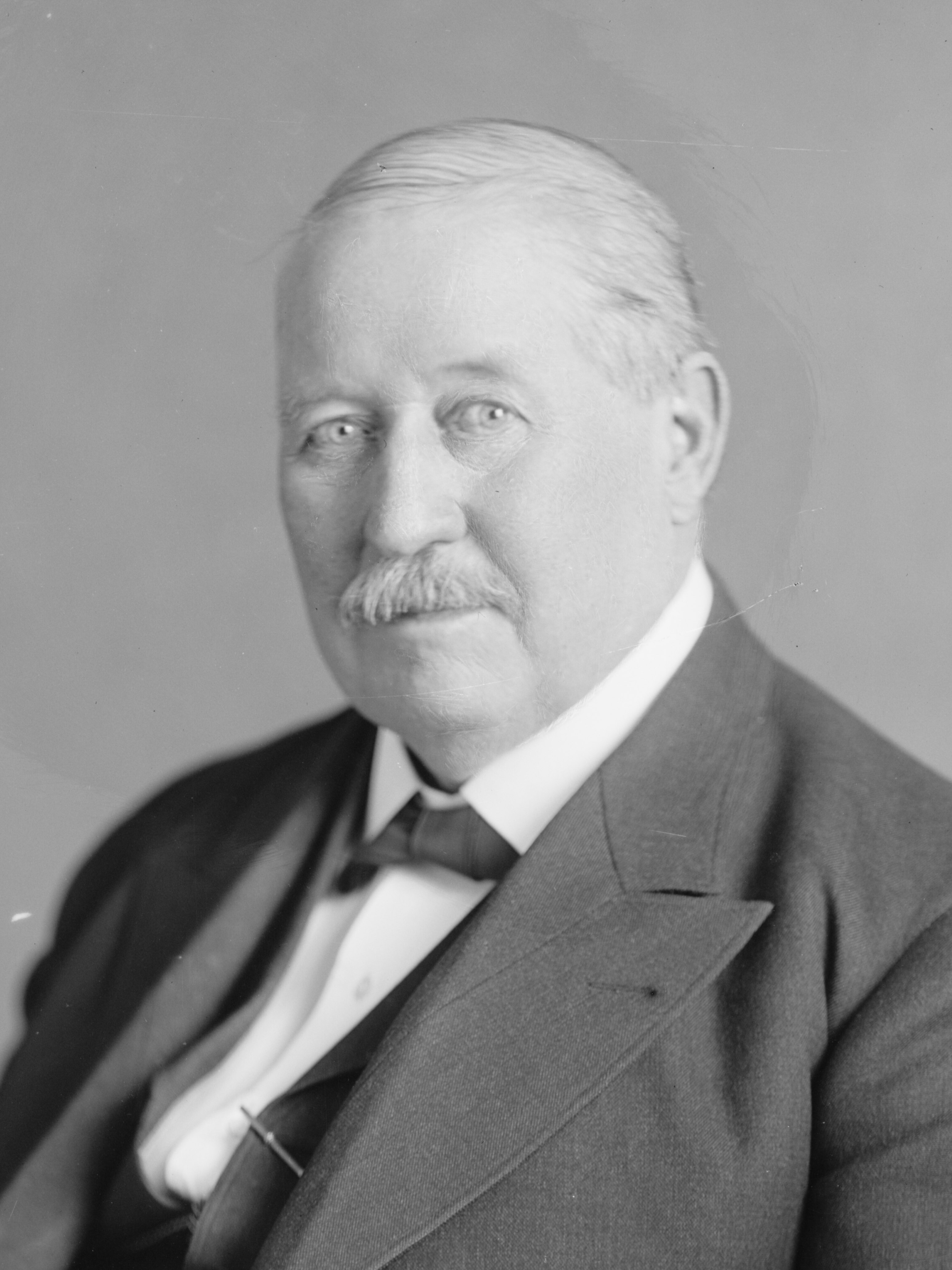
- Catron, 1905–1921

United States Senator from New Mexico
- In office March 27, 1912 – March 3, 1917
- Preceded by: Office created
- Succeeded by: Andrieus A. Jones

13th Mayor of Santa Fe, New Mexico
- In office 1906–1908
- Preceded by: A. R. Gibson
- Succeeded by: José D. Sena

Delegate to the U.S. House of Representatives from New Mexico Territory’s at-large district
- In office March 4, 1895 – March 3, 1897
- Preceded by: Antonio Joseph
- Succeeded by: Harvey Butler Fergusson

Personal details
- Born: October 6, 1840 near Lexington, Missouri, U.S.
- Died: May 15, 1921 (aged 80) Santa Fe, New Mexico, U.S.
- Party: Republican
- Spouse: Julia Anna Walz Catron (1857–1909)
- Children: 5
- Education: University of Missouri
- Profession: Attorney

Military service
- Allegiance: Confederate States
- Branch/service: Confederate Army
- Years of service: 1861–1865
- Rank: First lieutenant
- Commands: 3rd Missouri Battery

Thomas Benton Catron (October 6, 1840 – May 15, 1921) was an American politician and lawyer who was influential in the establishment of the U.S. state of New Mexico, and served as one of its first United States Senators. Catron has defenders but enemies have described him as a "greedy land grabber and ruthless politico."

Catron was a native of Missouri and a graduate of the University of Missouri. He was a Confederate States Army veteran of the American Civil War. After the war, he moved to New Mexico Territory, where he learned Spanish, studied law, and attained admission to the bar. A Republican even though most Southerners were Democrats, Catron soon made his mark in both law and politics, including serving as a district attorney, territorial attorney general (1869–1872), and United States Attorney for New Mexico (1872–1878). He later served on the New Mexico Territorial Council (1884, 1888, 1889), as the Territorial Delegate to Congress (1895–1897), President of the New Mexico Bar Association (1895), and Mayor of Santa Fe (1906–1908).

In addition to practicing law Catron was a member of the Santa Fe Ring of prominent attorneys, politicians and land speculators. He used his knowledge of New Mexico's Spanish and Mexican land grants to acquire land from Hispanic settlers unfamiliar with Anglo law and the English language and often not even aware that their ownership of the land where they lived was being challenged. He accumulated title to more than 3,000,000 acres (12,000 km^{2}), possibly making him the largest landholder in the United States. When New Mexico achieved statehood, the legislature elected Catron one of the state's first U.S. Senators. He served from 1912 to 1916, and was an unsuccessful candidate for reelection in 1916. He died in Santa Fe, and was buried in Santa Fe's Fairview Cemetery.

== Early life ==
Catron was born near Lexington, Missouri, on October 6, 1840, a son of John Catron and Mary (Fletcher) Catron, and was named after Missouri Senator Thomas Hart Benton. His ancestors emigrated from Germany to Virginia in 1765. He was educated in Lexington's public schools and at Masonic College in Lexington. He graduated from the University of Missouri in 1860.

== Civil War ==
During the American Civil War Catron joined the Confederate States Army, serving in Hiram M. Bledsoe's Battery, a unit of Sterling Price's command. Catron took part in the battles of Carthage, Wilson's Creek, Second Lexington, and Pea Ridge. By the end of the war Catron was a first lieutenant in command of the 3rd Missouri Battery. In the latter stages of the war he served during combat in Tennessee, Alabama, and Mississippi, before surrendering in Mississippi at the end of the war as part of Richard Taylor's command.

== Post-Civil War ==
Catron returned to Missouri after the war and began to study law. In 1866 he moved to the Territory of New Mexico, living in Las Cruces before settling in Mesilla. He traveled to New Mexico with two wagon loads of flour, which he sold to finance his legal studies, and a Spanish grammar book, which he used to begin to learn the language. (He soon became fluent by living in Spanish speaking communities and speaking only Spanish.) Catron completed his legal studies and was admitted to the bar in 1867.

== Political career ==
Unlike most Southerners who had supported the Confederacy, Catron was a Republican. Almost as soon as he began to practice Catron was appointed District Attorney for the Third Judicial District (present day Doña Ana County), and served until 1868.

In 1869 he was appointed Attorney General of the New Mexico Territory. In 1872 he was appointed United States Attorney for the District of New Mexico, an office previously held by his law partner, Civil War colleague and fellow Republican Stephen Benton Elkins, who had been elected to Congress. Catron served as U.S. Attorney until 1878.

While holding office as U.S. Attorney Catron moved to Santa Fe. In 1884 Catron was elected to the New Mexico Territorial Council, and he served again in 1888 and 1890. In 1892 Catron ran unsuccessfully for Delegate to Congress. He ran again in 1894 and won, serving one term March 4, 1895, to March 3, 1897. From 1895 to 1896 Catron was President of the New Mexico Bar Association. He was an unsuccessful candidate for reelection to Congress in 1896, and served on the Territorial Council again in 1899 and 1905.

From 1906 to 1908 Catron served as Mayor of Santa Fe.

== Land acquisition ==
As a lawyer familiar with the intricacies of old Mexican land grants, Catron gained an interest in or clear title to 34 grants totaling 3,000,000 acres (12,000 km^{2}). As a member of the group of land speculators known as "Santa Fe Ring," he became by 1894 the largest landowner in the United States.

After annexing New Mexico in 1848, the U.S. required that Spanish and Mexican land grants be "confirmed" by the U.S. courts and Congress. Hispanic claimants of land in the land grants often did not speak English and were suspicious of and unfamiliar with the American legal system—so different from the Hispanic. Many of the claimants were poor and unable to pursue the lengthy and expensive legal process of getting a claim confirmed. Moreover, the Surveyors General appointed by the U.S. had little knowledge of Hispanic land practices and customs. "The situation was ripe for fraud. The results were "large grants owned by speculators were erroneously confirmed; other grants which should have been confirmed were not...[and]...some valid grants were confirmed, but to the wrong people." The Santa Fe Ring of lawyers and politicians, often in league with the Surveyors General, abused the adjudication system for their own benefit.

Among Catron's acquisitions was the 600,000 acres (2,400 km^{2}) Tierra Amarilla Land Grant. Disputes about ownership have continued into the 21st century and erupted into violence on at least one occasion, a 1967 raid on the Rio Arriba County courthouse by Reies Tijerina and Hispanic claimants to grant land.

== United States Senator ==
Catron was an early advocate for New Mexico statehood, and in the early 1900s marshaled the territorial Republican Party to lobby Republicans at the national level for New Mexico's admission to the Union.

When New Mexico was admitted as the 47th state in 1912, the New Mexico State Legislature elected Catron as one of the state's first U.S. Senators. Catron won the "long term" (four years), while Albert B. Fall won the "short term" (one year). Catron took office on March 27, 1912.

To win election to the Senate, Catron made a personal alliance with Fall (later to be involved in the Teapot Dome scandal), ensuring that each of them would be elected. This alliance antagonized New Mexicans of Spanish heritage, who had hoped that one of their own would become a Senator.

At the start of his Senate career Catron served as Chairman of the Committee on Expenditures in the Interior Department. In 1916 he was a candidate for reelection, but lost the Republican nomination to Frank A. Hubbell. Hubbell went on to lose the general election to Andrieus A. Jones.

After leaving the Senate Catron returned to Santa Fe, where he resumed his law practice and business interests, and served in local offices including President of the Board of Education.

Catron was mentioned as a Senate candidate in 1918 if Fall did not run for reelection, but Fall decided to run, received the Republican nomination, and won another term.

== Retirement, death and burial ==
After leaving the Senate, Catron attempted unsuccessfully to receive an appointment as Ambassador to Chile. In retirement Catron continued to reside in Santa Fe. He died in Santa Fe on May 15, 1921, and was interred in a mausoleum at Fairview Cemetery.

== Family ==
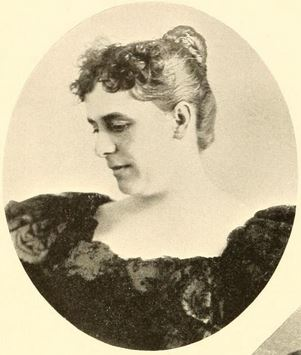
Julia Anna Walz

In 1887 Catron married Julia Anna Walz (March 28, 1857 – November 8, 1909), a native of Ohio. She had lived in Mankato, Minnesota, was a graduate of Oberlin College, and was teaching school when she met Catron. They had five children, four of whom lived to adulthood: John Walz; Charles Christopher; Thomas Benton II; and Fletcher Arthur.

== Awards and honors ==
Catron received an honorary Master of Arts degree from the University of Missouri in 1868, and in 1920 the University of Missouri awarded him an honorary LL.D.

Catron County, New Mexico, is named in his honor.

== In popular culture ==
A Chicano Spanglish poem, Lo que dirá ("What He Will Say") was written by T. A. Tornillo and published in the October 15, 1892 edition of El Hispano Americano, a newspaper in Las Vegas, New Mexico. It invites people not to vote for Catron in the November 8 election for Delegate to Congress and describes him as a ladrón banquero ("robber banker").

== See also ==
- Albert Jennings Fountain

U.S. House of Representatives
Preceded by Antonio Joseph	Delegate to the U.S. House of Representatives from New Mexico; 1895-1897	Succeeded by H. B. Fergusson
U.S. Senate
Preceded by none	U.S. senator (Class 1) from New Mexico; 1912–1917; Served alongside: Albert B. Fall	Succeeded by Andrieus A. Jones
