= Adelina Otero-Warren =

American suffragist

Nina Otero-Warren
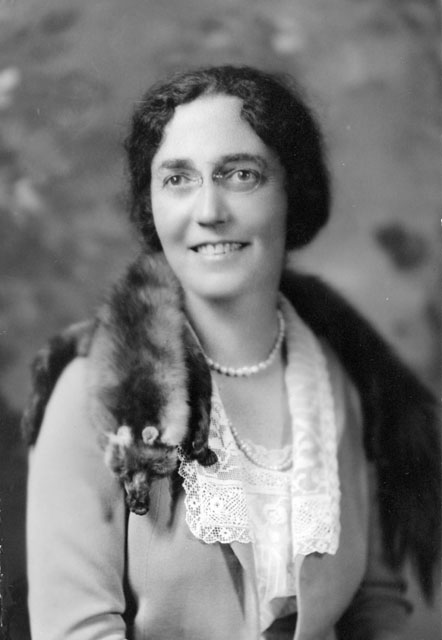
- Born: María Adelina Isabel Emilia Otero; October 23, 1881 near Los Lunas, New Mexico, U.S.
- Died: January 3, 1965 (aged 83); Santa Fe, New Mexico, U.S.
- Education: Maryville College of the Sacred Heart
- Occupations: Educator, politician, suffragist
- Political party: Republican
- Spouse: Rawson D. Warren (m. 1908; div. 1910)

María Adelina Isabel Emilia "Nina" Otero-Warren (October 23, 1881 – January 3, 1965) was an American woman's suffragist, educator, and politician. Otero-Warren created a legacy of civil service through her work in education, politics, and public health. She became one of New Mexico's first female government officials when she served as Santa Fe Superintendent of Instruction from 1917 to 1929. Otero-Warren was the first Latina to run for Congress, running unsuccessfully in 1922 as the Republican nominee to represent New Mexico's at-large district in the U.S. House of Representatives.

== Early life and education ==
On October 23, 1881, María Adelina Isabel Emilia (Nina) Otero was born on her family's hacienda “La Constancia,” close to Los Lunas, New Mexico. Her mother, Eloisa Luna Otero Bergere, and father, Manuel B. Otero, were part of the Hispanic elite (known as Hispanos). Her mother's family were among the first to settle in New Mexico arriving in 1598 during the Oñate settlement. Her father was also a descendant of longtime settlers, who migrated to New Mexico from Spain in 1786. Manuel was well-educated, studying in Washington D.C. at Georgetown University and in Germany at Heidelberg University, while her mother had studied at a Catholic Academy in New York. Her ancestors' successful "sheep drives" in California in the Gold Rush era enabled the family to develop political connections and rise to being landowners. Otero-Warren had an older brother, Eduardo, who lived from 1880 to 1932, and a younger brother, Manuel, who lived from 1883 to 1963, and nine half siblings.

In 1883, her father died during a quarrel against a band of Anglos who questioned his property ownership, leaving his daughter fatherless at the age of two. In 1886, Otero-Warren's mother married Alfred Maurice Bergere, an Englishman. The businessman had migrated to New Mexico in 1880 and worked for the Spiegelberg brothers’ mercantile enterprise. He was well-connected to the German mercantile and Anglo-American families in the New Mexican territory. This cross-cultural marriage between Eloisa and Alfred merged political and economic agendas between Anglos and the Spanish elite.

Her mother raised Adelina within the traditional realm of a Spanish Hacienda in Los Lunas, surrounded by relatives and other well-to-do Hispanic families. Their family lived in the Luna Mansion, an adobe-brick home built to resemble a Southern plantation. The Santa Fe Railroad built the Luna Mansion in 1881 in exchange for the rights to pass through the Lunas' land. Adelina was raised, in part, by an Irish governess named Mary Elizabeth Doyle.

Her mother was an activist for social and educational developments, and in the early 1900s, she became the director of Santa Fe’s Board of Education. A mother figure of Santa Fe, she opened her home to political exchange. Her mother focused on the importance of education, improving schools locally, and she cared for those who are poor and sick.

From 1892 to 1894, Otero-Warren attended a private Catholic boarding school (later known as Maryville College of the Sacred Heart) in Saint Louis, Missouri. This school helped develop her social consciousness, and it imparted the idea that women could have careers as teachers and community leaders. Even from a young age, her family remembers her desires to lead, describing that she "had the brains of the family." After returning from her time in St. Louis, she taught her siblings what she had learned in school, and asked her male relatives to teach her how to shoot pistols and other firearms so she could protect herself.

In 1897, she moved to Santa Fe, New Mexico, when her father Manuel's cousin, Miguel Antonio Otero II, was appointed territorial governor of New Mexico (1897-1906).

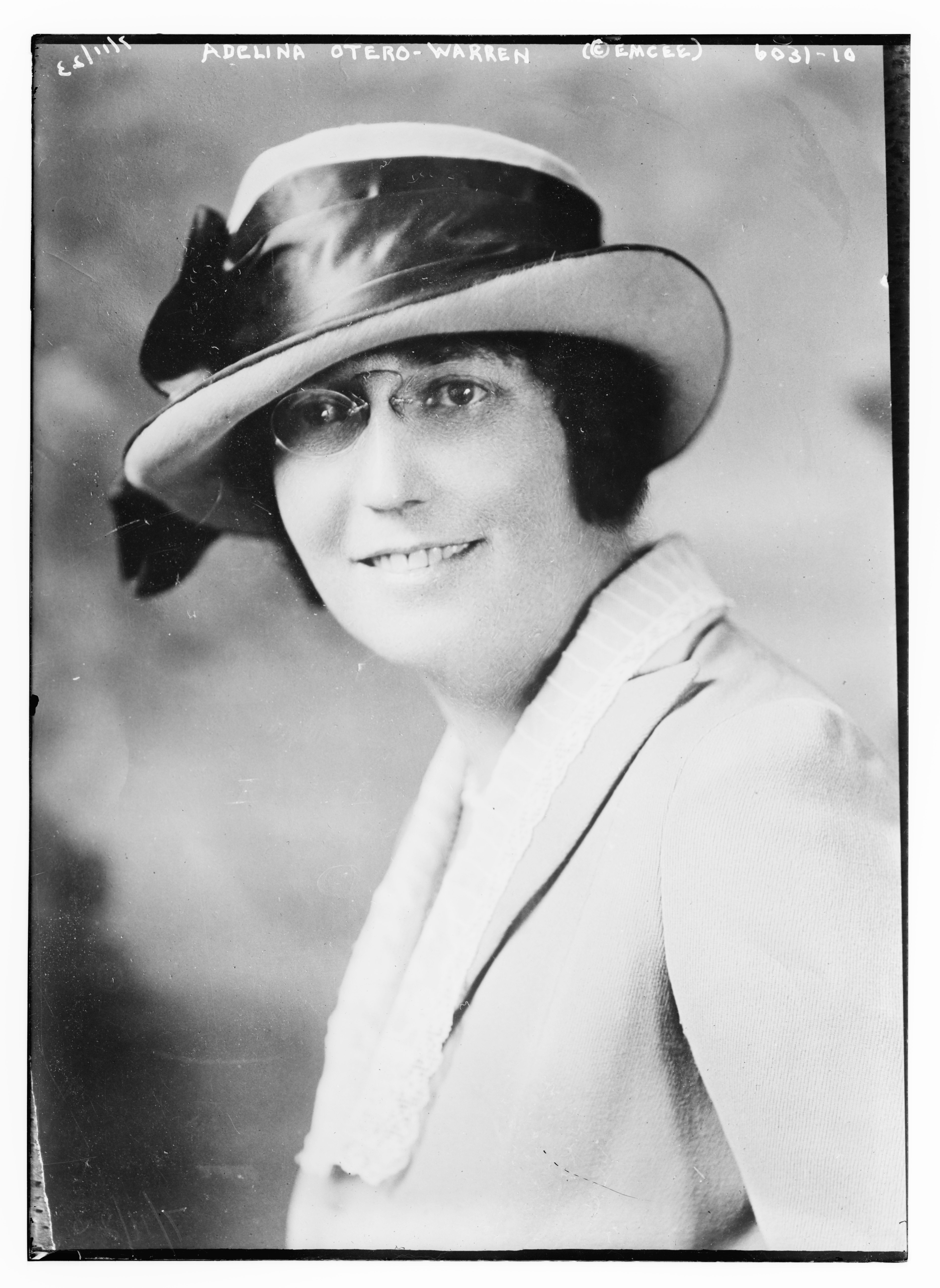
Adelina Otero-Warren, 1900

== Early adulthood ==
Adelina married a cavalry officer, Lieutenant Rawson D. Warren in 1908. At the time, he was stationed at Fort Wingate in New Mexico. Two years later, at age twenty-six, Otero-Warren divorced her husband. Perhaps she felt dissatisfied with her newly founded, less progressive, dependent role she inherited as Warren's wife. Other sources suggest that she discovered that he had a common-law wife and two children living in the Philippines. Regardless of why she divorced, she called herself a "widow" to avoid the stigma of divorce, which at the time was deemed unacceptable culturally and religiously. However, she kept Warren's last name and asserted that her husband had died soon after they married.

In 1912, she relocated to New York City, likely to care for her brother Luna Bergere, a medical student at Columbia University. While she lived in the city, she was active in Anne Morgan's settlement house, an organization aimed to aid working-class women. At the settlement house, she organized arts and crafts programs.

Eloisa, Otero-Warren's mother and first influential role model, died in 1914. Eloisa bequeathed her first husband's lands to her first two sons, Eduardo and Manuel, and her Luna family landholdings to Adelina, which followed traditions of Hispanas passing on lands they brought into their marriage to their daughters. Her death brought Adelina back from New York City to care for her nine half-siblings. While she became a surrogate mother to her siblings, she left the day-to-day child-rearing tasks to her sister Anita, who returned from a religious vocation in a convent after their mother's death, and their governess, Elizabeth Doyle.

Among some of Otero-Warren's closest friends were artists and writers who impacted the 20th century's progressive movement, including Mary Austin, Witter Byner, Mamie Meadors, and Alice Henderson.

== Political career and professional work ==
=== Political career and suffragist activism ===
Otero-Warren also made close ties with Ella St. Clair Thompson, the woman who headed the Congressional Union for Women's Suffrage upon her arrival in New Mexico.

In 1914, Otero-Warren started working with the woman's suffrage campaign in New Mexico with Alice Paul's Congressional Union (forerunner of the National Woman's Party). Her commitment to working with women's groups and lobbying legislators for suffrage helped her rise in the leadership ranks in the state Congressional Union (CU). The CU wanted to include Hispanics in its campaign to ensure New Mexico ratified the Nineteenth Amendment, and Otero-Warren's activism made her an ideal candidate to lead the CU and reach out to the Hispanic population. She was the first Mexican-American state leader of the Congressional Union in New Mexico, and her leadership rallied support from both the Spanish- and English-speaking communities. When Alice Paul asked Otero-Warren to take on this role, Otero-Warren replied, "I will keep out of the local fuss...but will take a stand and a firm one whenever necessary for I am with you now and always."

Otero-Warren also sought support for suffrage though her other political leadership roles as the chair of legislative committees for the Republican Party and the New Mexico Federation of Women's Clubs. Otero-Warren lobbied New Mexico congressmen to vote in favor of the Nineteenth Amendment, and she was so influential because of her uncle and other Hispanic relatives who were elected leaders. She played such an important role in this activist effort that Alice Paul, the leader of the CU, credited Otero-Warren with ensuring New Mexico ratified the Nineteenth Amendment. New Mexico obtained full suffrage as the federal amendment was ratified in 1920.

Otero-Warren believed that she could have an even greater role in advocating for Hispanics, particularly in regards to education, if she held a congressional seat. New Mexico's population was so small that it only had one seat in the House of Representatives, and so this single seat was a highly sought after position because it was so influential. She received the Republican Party nomination to run for the U.S. House of Representatives in 1922, after she defeated incumbent Néstor Montoya. She received 466.5 votes to Montoya's 99.5 votes. With this victory as Republican Party nominee, Otero-Warren became the first Latina to run for Congress.

If elected to the House of Representatives, she promised Hispanic landowners restoration of their communal land grants in New Mexico. She celebrated her Hispanic heritage by speaking Spanish and advocating for the preservation of Hispanic heritage and culture. Her Progressive campaign advocated for improved education, health care, and welfare services. Controversy abounded, however, when news of her divorce came out during her election, as well as concerns about her stance on Spanish-language instruction in schools and employment of Hispanic teachers. Ultimately, she was defeated by Democrat John Morrow, who received 59,254 votes (55.4%) to Otero-Warren's 49,635 votes (45.6%).

=== Leadership in education and public health ===
==== 1910s–1920s ====
From 1917 to 1929, she served as one of New Mexico's first female government officials as the Santa Fe Superintendent of Instruction. In this position, she committed to improving the education of Hispanics, Native Americans, and students in rural areas, in particular. She made several substantial changes in her tenure as superintendent. She repaired dilapidated school buildings, and she improved teacher salaries. She increased the school year's duration to nine months, and she created county high school and adult education programs. She made extensive curriculum changes that emphasized bilingual and bicultural education. This blended education for Hispanic children included the following innovations: "English language instruction in the classroom, teacher sensitivity to different cultures, Spanish instruction through the arts, no punishment for speaking Spanish in the classroom or in the schoolyard, and parent-teacher instruction of artisan trades." This blended style of education, or "Americanization with kindness" was revolutionary at a time when Southwestern schools punished students for speaking Spanish. Her half-sister Anita Bergere succeeded her in this position, after Otero-Warren chose not to run for reelection after controversy developed in 1927 that she held a conflict of interest serving as a local sales representative for the textbook purveyor Houghton Mifflin Company. While the Board of Education released her from any charges of wrongdoing, this encounter led Otero-Warren to seek new opportunities.

In 1919, the Governor of New Mexico, Octaviano A. Larrazolo appointed her to the state Board of Health, and soon after, she became chair of the committee. She was elected to this position due to her work with other groups like the Red Cross and the Women's Auxiliary of the State Council of Defense.

She briefly served as an inspector of Native American schools in Santa Fe County after her 1923 appointment. She advocated against sending Native children to boarding schools off of their reservations, and sought better cooperation between families and schools. While she did make efforts to Americanize Native students, she also sought to integrate opportunities to learn about Native culture, history, and traditions.

==== 1930s–1940s ====
After ending her tenure as Superintendent of Instruction, Otero-Warren continued to pursue opportunities to integrate ethnic cultures and languages into the public school curriculum of New Mexico. At a time when many Progressive activists sought the integration of industrial education into the curriculum, Otero-Warren's approach emphasized doing this in a way that infused local culture into artisan training (e.g. through the teaching of "artisan crafts of weaving, furniture making, and leather goods" in New Mexico).

She was appointed as state director of the federal Civilian Conservation Corps (CCC) by President Franklin D. Roosevelt. In 1930, she became the Director of Literacy Education for the CCC. During this period, literacy was very low, and she continued to fight for bilingual education. Increased literacy, she argued, would help residents be better citizens.

In 1941 she worked with the Works Progress Administration (WPA) and the CCC on adult education. She was appointed as the Director of the Work Conference for Adult Teachers in Río Piedras, Puerto Rico. Finding an immense lack of resources, she incorporated a strategic educational program to teach Spanish as the primary language until 5th grade, and offered English as a foreign language. She aimed to merge and create a transcultural bridge to better civic circumstances. She also created a program at Borinquen Field for sailors, soldiers, Air Force, and marines in the United States to familiarize them with the Spanish language.

In the 1930s and 1940s, she also worked to preserve historic structures in Santa Fe and Taos. During this time she made connections with a variety of artists, writers, and intellectuals in this area of New Mexico. Throughout her life, she continued to promote and celebrate Hispanic and Native cultures, arts, and languages.

=== Publications ===
During the mid-1930s, Otero-Warren focused on writing. In 1931 Otero-Warren expressed her view on education as well as her cultural awareness in the printed May issue of Survey Graphic (published as Otero-Warren Otero). In 1936 her writings referencing her early life on the Luna hacienda became published as a book, Old Spain in Our Southwest (published as Nina Otero). She discussed her youth on the ranch, where she formed her self-sufficient and independent character. This record along with her less political works with the communities in Santa Fe and Taos to protect historic landmarks and art as well as more modern efforts in artistic communities, show her versatile appreciation for politics, education, art, and business.

In her writing, Mexicans in Our Midst: Newest and Oldest Settlers of the Southwest, she illustrated the beauty of her homeland and culture to a vast audience.

== Late personal life and legacy ==
In the 1920s, she developed a relationship with Mamie Meadors. Meadors, seeking relief from tuberculosis, moved to Santa Fe in 1918. She joined Otero-Warren's campaign in 1922 as a volunteer, and later was hired as Otero-Warren's assistant to help with her work as inspector of Native American schools. While they lived in different homes on the same homestead, they spent much of their time together, and were known as "Las Dos" ("The Two").

By 1947 she began her real estate business in Santa Fe named Las Dos Realty and Insurance Company with Meadors. After Meadors died in 1951, Otero-Warren continued their business. She remained focused on selling homes and did so until her death at the age of eighty-three. Even in her old age she was always a financial support for those around her.

Her legacy continued after her death on January 3, 1965. On October 26, 1988, in Colorado Springs, Colorado, the Otero Elementary School was founded. It remains a symbol and tribute to Otero-Warren.

In 2021, the United States Mint announced that Otero-Warren would be among the first women depicted on the reverse of the quarter as a part of the American Women quarters series. The Otero quarter was released in 2022, making Otero-Warren the first Hispanic American to appear on US currency.

In the first run of the 2022 musical Suffs Otero-Warren was played by Susan Oliveras.

== See also ==
- List of suffragists and suffragettes
