= Legend of Billy the Kid =

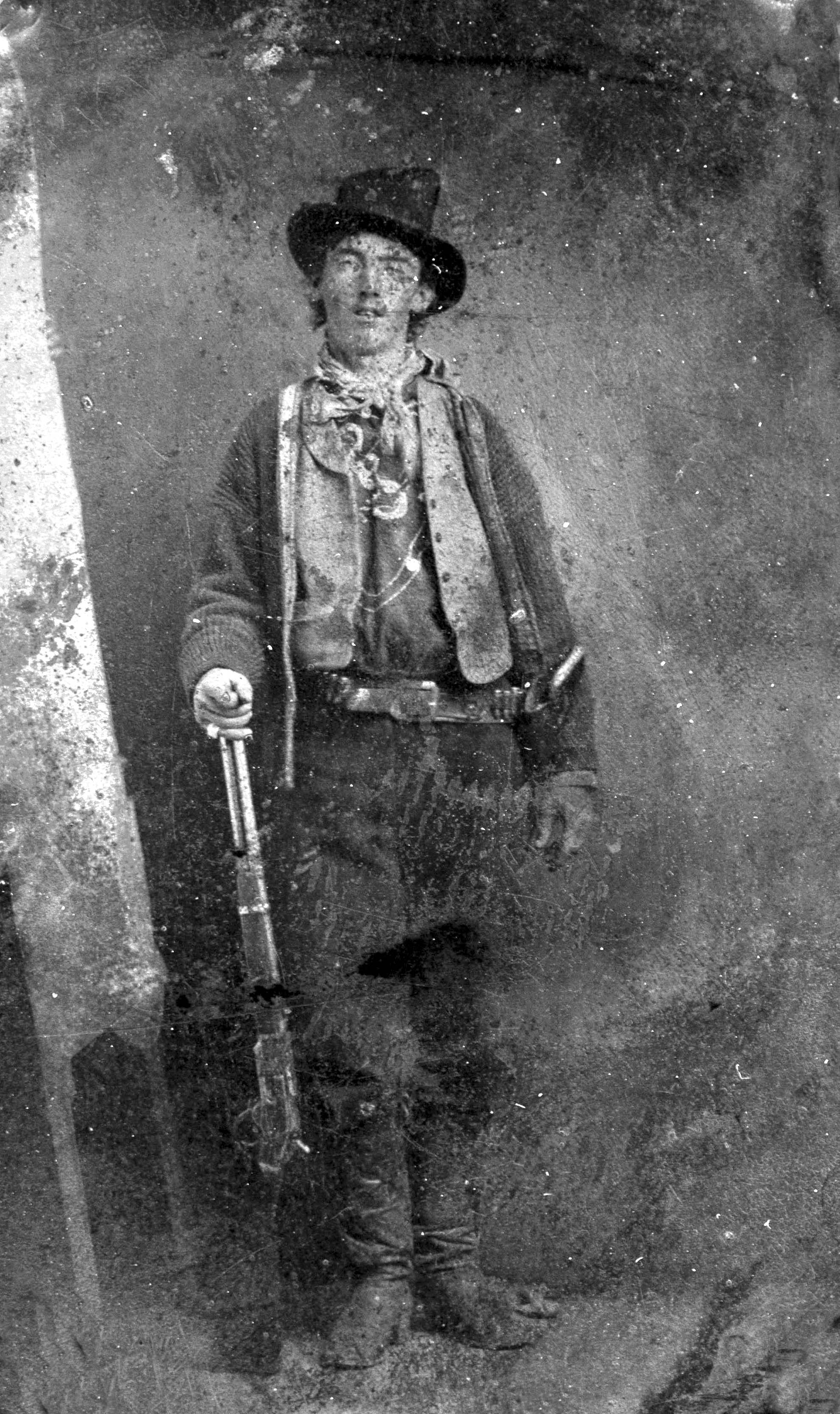
Billy the Kid c. 1880

The legend of Billy the Kid has acquired iconic status in American folklore. More has been written about Billy the Kid than any other gunslinger in the history of the American Old West, while hundreds of books, films, plays, and radio and television programs have been inspired by his legend. Despite his enduring reputation, the outlaw himself, also known as William Bonney, had minimal impact on historical events in New Mexico Territory of the late 19th century.

When he was still alive, "Billy the Kid" had already become a nationally known figure whose exploits, real and imaginary, were reported in the National Police Gazette and the large newspapers of the eastern United States. After his death on July 14, 1881, every newspaper in New York City published his obituary, and within days newspapers around the United States were printing exaggerated and romanticized accounts of Billy the Kid's short career. In the fifteen or so dime novels about his criminal career published between 1881 and 1906, the Kid was customarily depicted as a badman with superior gunslinging skills and often portrayed as an outlaw antihero, or even as a demonic agent of Satan who delighted in murder.

== Beginning of the legend ==
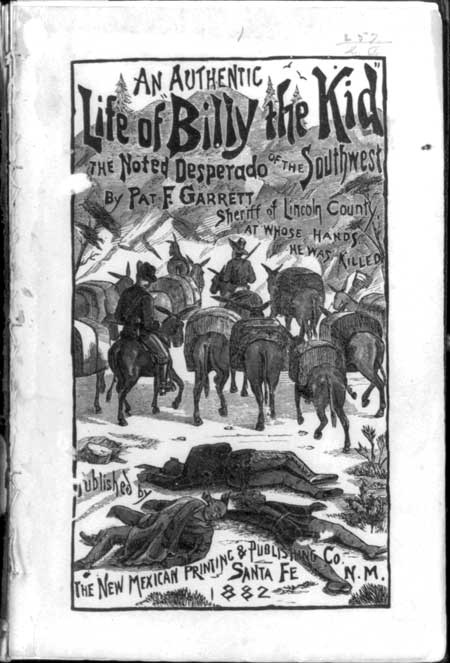
Garrett's The Authentic Life of Billy, the Kid was published in 1882

Within six weeks of Bonney's death there appeared the first complete narrative of his life, The True Life of Billy the Kid. Written by dime novelist John Woodruff Lewis under the pen name "Don Jenardo", this pulp novel depicted Billy the Kid as a sadistic psychopath.

Pat Garrett, smarting from local outrage over his shooting of the Kid, wanted to present his side of the story and hoped to turn a profit as well on the American public's fascination with the notorious outlaw. Consequently, he published his account of Bonney's life, The Authentic Life of Billy, the Kid, in 1882. It was credited to Garrett, but the first fifteen chapters were a concoction of factual material mixed with fabrications, written by Roswell's postmaster, Ash Upson, an itinerant journalist. The remaining chapters, written in a more restrained style, are generally accurate, and were likely composed by Garrett himself. The book failed to find a wide audience and sold just a few copies; nevertheless, although filled with many errors of fact, The Authentic Life served afterwards as the main source for most books written about the Kid until the 1960s. Thus was established the mythic stature of Pat Garrett as the heroic lawman in pursuit of the villainous but romantic desperado, Billy the Kid.

The lawman and former ranch hand Charlie Siringo first told his version of the Kid's story in a chapter of his book, "A Texas Cowboy" (1885). During his youth, Siringo had ridden the range in eastern New Mexico and the Texas Panhandle, the familiar haunts of William Bonney and Pat Garrett, and knew both of them. In 1920, he published a sympathetic biography, History of Billy the Kid, in which he described the daily life of a cowboy realistically, but romanticized his account of Bonney with fantasies and exaggerations—its title page claimed "His six years of daring outlawry has never been equalled in the annals of criminal history."

Three governors of New Mexico wrote accounts of their dealings with Billy the Kid. Miguel Antonio Otero, the first governor of the territory, knew William Bonney, and was the first Mexican-American author to write about him. Otero's book, The Real Billy the Kid: With New Light on the Lincoln County War, was published in 1936. In it, he wrote admiringly of Bonney and described events of the time and place from the perspective of native New Mexicans. The Kid spoke Spanish fluently and was well-liked by the Hispanos of the Pecos River Valley, who told many stories about el Chivato, their colloquial Spanish for a young goat or kid.

=== Emerging symbol of the Old West ===
The modern legend of Billy the Kid as an immortal figure of the Old West first developed within a larger cultural context of social upheaval in the late 19th and early 20th century United States. Between 1897 and 1909, during the Progressive Era of political activism and reform, the popular American novelist Emerson Hough wrote magazine articles, novels and informal histories that reintroduced Billy the Kid to a national audience, albeit in works that often relied more on fantasy than on actual events. Hough embellished the Kid's reputation with lurid descriptions of his exceptional villainy in an article called "Billy the Kid: The True Story of a Western 'Bad Man' ", written in 1901 for the literary publication, Everybody's Magazine, using language such as "the soul of some fierce and far-off carnivore got into the body of this little man, this boy, this fiend in tight boots and a broad hat." Hough further developed this image of the Kid in his book about western desperados, The Story of the Outlaw (1907), though not in such excessive language.

By the mid-1920s, however, Bonney's place in the general awareness of the American public had diminished to the point that in 1925 Harvey Fergusson asked in the American Mercury magazine, "Who remembers Billy the Kid?". His reputation was revitalized the next year when Walter Noble Burns's book, The Saga of Billy the Kid, appeared as the Book-of-the-Month Club selection for December 1926, and became a bestseller. This success, and the fact that people who had actually known William Bonney were beginning to talk to reporters and write their memoirs, allowed stories of his exploits to regain a nationwide audience. Publication of "The Saga", in spite of its dubious facts and fabricated events, subsequently led to a proliferation of other books, magazines and newspaper articles, and then to movies, about the life of Billy the Kid.

Depictions of Billy the Kid in popular culture fluctuated between the poles of cold-blooded murderer without a heart and sentimental hero fighting for justice. Kent Ladd Steckmesser wrote: "There are two Billy the Kids in legend. The first is a tough little thug, a coward, a thief, and a cold-blooded murderer. The second is a romantic and sentimental hero, the brave and likeable leader of an outnumbered band fighting for justice." Both facets of his legend were perpetuated in often poorly researched biographies, as well as in fictionalized B movies, many of which were nonetheless commercially successful.

The dramatic aspects of William Bonney's short life and violent death still appealed to popular taste, as they had in the heyday of the dime novels, but eventually an idealized image of Billy the Kid, as one who defends the underdog and fights against social injustice, came to the fore. The Texas historian, J. Frank Dobie, wrote in A Vaquero of the Brush Country (1929): "...because his daring apotheosized youth—youth in the saddle—youth with a flaming gun—and because his daring kept him running and balancing on the edge of a frightful precipice...Billy the Kid will always be interesting, will always appeal to the popular imagination."

=== Billy the Kid in film and on stage ===
With the publication in 1926 of Walter Noble Burns's book,"The Saga of Billy the Kid", the Kid's legend revived and was consolidated as a standard tale of the American Old West. The American movie director King Vidor, who had wanted to film a Western-themed movie for some time, was inspired when he read Burns's book, and felt that the Kid's story had considerable dramatic appeal. Following the commercial success of the first movie he directed for the Metro Goldwyn Mayer studio, The Big Parade (1925), he was able to obtain backing for a Billy the Kid production when Irving Thalberg, an executive at MGM, took an interest in his proposal. Billy the Kid, the first talking picture version of the legend, was released in 1930. The film featured former college football star Johnny Mack Brown in the title role and Hollywood character actor Wallace Beery as Pat Garrett, but it was a box office failure. Nevertheless, Vidor's Billy the Kid set the pattern for Billy the Kid movies for the next fifty years, as other filmmakers followed its formula and made the Kid an instrument of justified vengeance and his enemies the villains of the story.

As Billy the Kid was reborn a romantic or tragic figure in literature and films of the 1920s–1940s; high culture began to turn its attention to his legend in the late 1930s. Lincoln Kirstein, co-founder with George Balanchine of the School of American Ballet, drew material from Burns' book to write the libretto for a ballet to be called Billy the Kid, performed by his new group, the Ballet Caravan. Composer Aaron Copland was commissioned to score the music, and Eugene Loring to do the choreography. The ballet premiered at the Chicago Civic Opera House on October 16, 1938, and has since become a repertory standard. Copland arranged the score for a concert suite that was performed and recorded in 1959 by Leonard Bernstein conducting the New York Philharmonic Orchestra; the recording was released by Columbia Records in 1960.

The Outlaw, starring Jack Buetel as Billy the Kid, Walter Huston as Doc Holliday, and Jane Russell in her first movie role, was produced by Howard Hughes and finished in 1941, though not released until 1943. The film, directed for the most part by Howard Hawks (Hughes got the screen credit), was promoted in a publicity campaign with posters featuring Russell posing in dishabille and her cleavage prominently displayed. Its emphasis on Jane Russell's physical attributes led to the film being dubbed the first "sex western". Although the movie was generally panned by movie critics, it was rereleased twice over the course of the next decade, grossing more than $20 million and solidifying the legend of Billy the Kid (although a distorted and unhistorical one) in the consciousness of the American filmgoing public.

The film director Sam Peckinpah attempted an ambitious retelling of the legend in his last western film, Pat Garrett and Billy the Kid (1973), covering the final months of Bonney's life, in which the violence and physical brutality of the world the protagonists inhabited is portrayed realistically. The film suffered from production difficulties as well as from Peckinpah's battles with MGM over his artistic vision and budget overruns. The studio's drastically cut release version, disowned by Peckinpah, was initially a failure with major critics and the viewing public. Although its depiction of the Kid as a roguish anarchist opposed to illegitimate law (as enforced by Garrett on behalf of a corrupt power structure) was suited to the temper of the times, it quickly left first-run theaters. Soon, however, reviews began to appear in smaller film magazines and journals in the United States and abroad that praised its artistry and breadth of vision. The film's reputation was on the ascendancy long before Peckinpah's preferred cut of the preview version was finally shown at the University of Southern California in 1986, and its critical stature has continued to increase since—Martin Scorsese, e.g., called it a "masterpiece". Despite the liberties it took with history, scholar and film editor Paul Seydor described Pat Garrett and Billy the Kid as among the finest treatments of the legend in any medium.

== Billy the Kid as cultural icon ==
The psychoanalyst Alfred Adler wrote an analysis in 1951 of the mythic aspects of the legend of Billy the Kid in which he compared the Kid to Oedipus, King Arthur, Robin Hood, and other legendary heroes of the past. Adler was the first writer to discuss the symbolic significance of Billy the Kid's nickname as a cultural totem.

Arthur Penn's film, The Left Handed Gun (1958), portrays Billy the Kid as a misunderstood youth, played by Paul Newman in the manner of James Dean in Rebel Without a Cause, according to the film critic Robert Kolker. It similarly addresses the psychological motivations of those of its characters who resort to violence, in a pseudo-Freudian treatment of the subject characteristic of certain 1950s movies.

In 1941, Life magazine ran a piece on Billy the Kid called America's Best-Loved Badman. Historian Stephen Tatum, writing forty years later, referred to the contradictory aspects of the mythical Billy the Kid, calling him a "flexible container" into which audiences poured their "hopes and fears, ideals and prejudices." Writers and filmmakers have often depicted William Bonney as the personification of the "free-running reprobate" of the Old West, of the sort whom the reformed outlaw Emmett Dalton wondered if "he symbolizes the undying anarchy in the heart of every man." In any case, the mythical Billy the Kid remains an icon of popular American culture, and the skinny, bucktoothed kid from New York City occupies the top place in Western American folklore. The mythologizing continues with new works in various media.

== See also ==
- List of works about Billy the Kid
