= The True Death of Billy the Kid =

- Main characters: Billy the Kid
- Series: Treasury of 20th Century Murder
- Page count: 60 pages
- Publisher: NBM Publishing

Original publication
- Language: English

The True Death of Billy the Kid is a 2018 graphic novel about the death of wild west outlaw Billy the Kid written and drawn by cartoonist Rick Geary.

== Publication history ==
The book was Geary's third to be financed by Kickstarter and was montivated partially by wishing to do a more commercial work after his second Kickstarter campaign was barely a success, as well as his move to Lincoln County, New Mexico, where many events of Billy the Kid's life took place. At the Kickstarter the book was planned as a 60-page black and white graphic novel. In 2014 when speaking on the project Geary stated that he "consulted different people who are experts on the subject to give me advice and pass on the accuracy on the book" since he was aware that many people of New Mexico hold Billy the Kid's legend in high regard. In October 2016 Geary held a presentation on the book at the Capitan Public Library's First Friday Event.

The book was published in 2018 by NBM Publishing as part of their Treasury of 20th Century Murder series.

By 2018 Geary was working on a sequel to the book about the Lincoln County War.

== Reception ==
Jason Michelitch of The Comics Journal states that the book follows the trends Geary set in previous works in that it depicts history in an objective maner which still implies complexities beyond the snipets of events chosen to be shown. Michelitch also commends the emotions depicted on characters faces, even ones which only show up for a few panels. A. F. Jones of Outright Geekery praised the comic, stating that it's a "must read". Publishers Weekly gave the book a good review, noting that Geary depicts the human side of Billy the Kid's life. Simon Wigzell of Serienytt was very positive towards the book and noted how it displayed changes in Geary's artwork with his lines becoming thicker over time compared to his early work. Stephen Wiacek of Now Read This praised the book, stating that Geary's storytelling is a testament to the graphic novel medium being fit more than just for fantasy. Frank Plowright of The Slings & Arrows graphic novel guide rated it 4.5 of 5 stars. Brigid Alverson of ICv2 gave it 5 out of 5 stars.

== See also ==
- List of works about Billy the Kid
