= List of works about Billy the Kid =

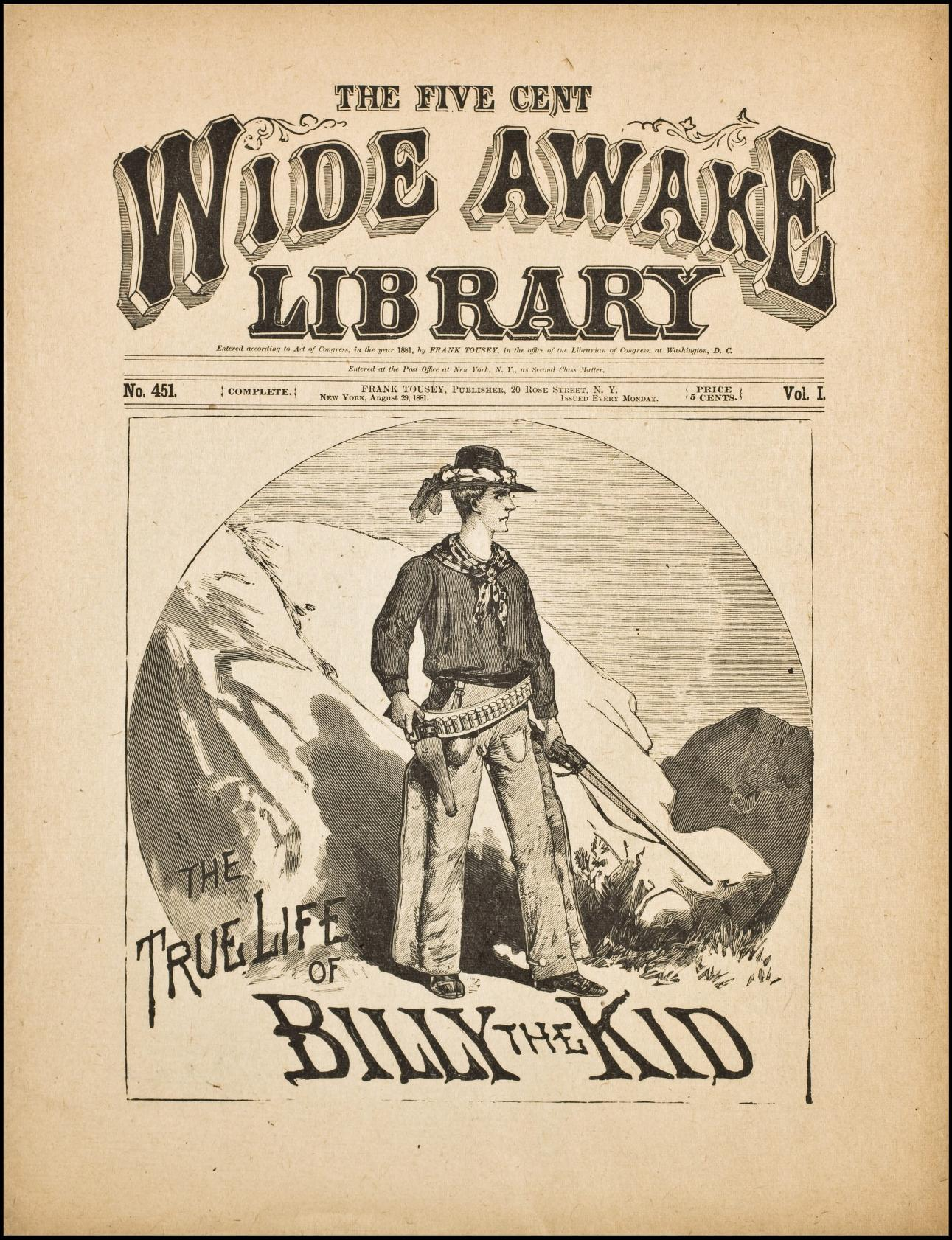
The True Life of Billy the Kid first appeared in print in August 1881

Hundreds of songs, books, motion pictures, radio and television programs, and plays have been inspired by the story of the outlaw Billy the Kid. Depictions of him in popular culture have fluctuated between a cold-blooded murderer without a heart and a sentimental hero fighting for justice. The Texas historian, J. Frank Dobie, wrote many years ago in A Vaquero of the Brush Country (1929): "...Billy the Kid will always be interesting, will always appeal to the popular imagination". While a plethora of writers and filmmakers have depicted Billy the Kid as the personification of either heroic youth or juvenile punk, a few have attempted to portray a more complex character. In any case, the dramatic aspects of his short life and violent death still appeal to popular taste, and he remains an icon of teenage rebellion and nonconformity. The mythologizing of his story continues with new works in various media.

== Comics ==
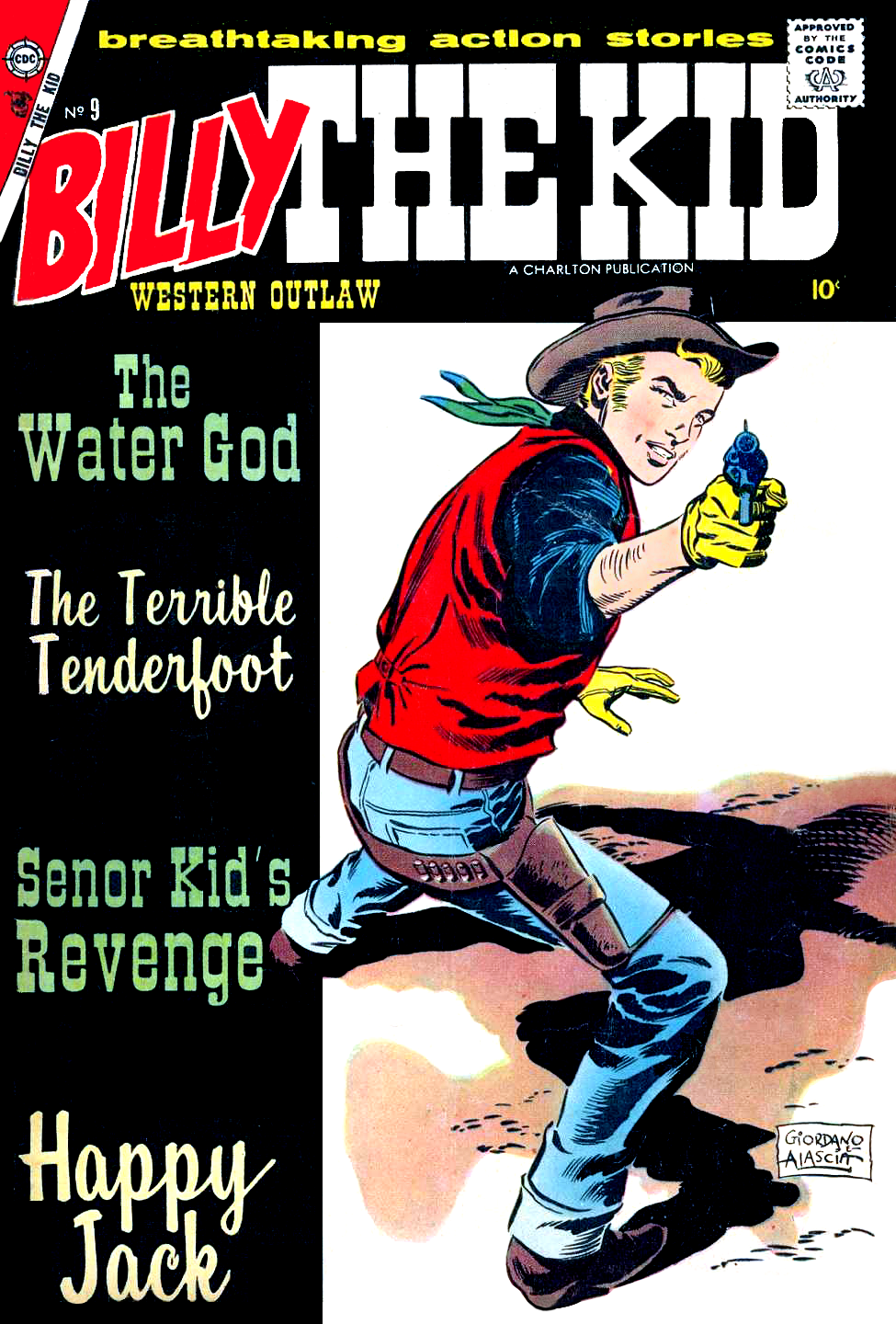
Billy the Kid #9 (Nov. 1957).

- Billy the Kid Adventure Magazine (1950–1955)
- Billy the Kid (1957–1983)
- Billy the Kid (1962)
- L'Escorte (1966)
- Billy the Kid's Old Timey Oddities (2005)
- The True Death of Billy the Kid (2018)

== Literature ==
- The Authentic Life of Billy, the Kid (1882), a biography and partly first-hand account written by Pat Garrett, sheriff of Lincoln County, New Mexico
- The Saga of Billy the Kid (1926) by Walter Noble Burns
- El asesino desinteresado Bill Harrigan (1935), a short story by Jorge Luis Borges, part of the series A Universal History of Infamy
- Billy The Kid (1958), a serial poem by Jack Spicer
- El bandido adolescente (1965), by Ramón J. Sender.
- The Collected Works of Billy the Kid: Left-Handed Poems, by Michael Ondaatje, 1970 biography in the form of experimental poetry
- Anything for Billy (1988) is a fictionalized account of Billy's last year by Larry McMurtry
- Billy the Kid: A Short and Violent Life (1989), a modern, comprehensive biography by Robert Utley
- The Illegal Rebirth of Billy the Kid (1991) is a science fiction novel by Rebecca Ore
- Whatever Happened to Billy the Kid, by Helen Airy, Sunstone Press; 1st Edition (2005), ISBN 978-0865341852. In it Billy the Kid escapes from Pat Garrett and lives out his life as John Miller
- The Kid (2016), a novel of Billy the Kid's life by Ron Hansen

== Film ==
- Billy the Kid, a 1911 silent film directed by Laurence Trimble and starring Edith Storey as Billy, and Tefft Johnson
- Billy the Kid, 1930 widescreen film directed by King Vidor and starring Johnny Mack Brown as Billy and Wallace Beery as Pat Garrett
- Billy the Kid Returns, 1938: Roy Rogers plays a dual role, Billy the Kid and his dead-ringer lookalike who shows up after the Kid has been shot by Pat Garrett.
- Billy the Kid, 1941 remake of the 1930 film, starring Robert Taylor and Brian Donlevy
- Bob Steele and Buster Crabbe portrayed Billy the Kid in a series of 42 western films from 1940 through 1947, released by Poverty Row studio Producers Distributing Corporation. Some of the titles include Blazing Frontier, The Renegade, Cattle Stampede, and Western Cyclone (1943). In a 1952 film, Allan "Rocky" Lane goes after Billy the Kid's lost treasure.
- The Outlaw, Howard Hughes' 1943 motion picture starring Jack Buetel as Billy and featuring Jane Russell in her breakthrough role as the Kid's fictional love interest
- I Shot Billy the Kid, a 1950 film directed by William Berke and starring Don "Red" Barry as Billy
- The Kid from Texas (1950) starring Audie Murphy as Billy the Kid
- The Law vs. Billy the Kid (1954, Columbia Pictures Corporation) starring Scott Brady as the Kid, James Griffith as Pat Garrett, Betta St. John as Nita Maxwell, and Alan Hale, Jr. as Bob Olinger
- The Left Handed Gun, Arthur Penn's 1958 motion picture based on a Gore Vidal teleplay, starring Paul Newman as Billy and John Dehner as Garrett
- The Boy from Oklahoma (1954), with Tyler MacDuff in the role of Billy the Kid
- Billy the Kid Versus Dracula (1966), directed by William Beaudine, has Count Dracula, played by John Carradine, traveling to the Old West, where he takes a shine to Billy's fiancée and tries to turn her into a vampire. Chuck Courtney co-stars as Billy.
- Chisum (1970), set during the Lincoln County War, was directed by Andrew V. McLaglen and stars Geoffrey Deuel as Billy and Glenn Corbett as Pat Garrett.
- Dirty Little Billy (1972), set during Billy's early years as a criminal, starred Michael J. Pollard
- Pat Garrett and Billy the Kid, Sam Peckinpah's 1973 motion picture with Kris Kristofferson as Billy, James Coburn as Pat Garrett, and with a soundtrack by Bob Dylan, who also appears in the movie
- The New Morning of Billy the Kid (1986), a Japanese absurdist comedy directed by Naoto Yamakawa
- Young Guns, Christopher Cain's 1988 motion picture starring Emilio Estevez as Billy and Patrick Wayne as Pat Garrett
- Gore Vidal's Billy the Kid, Gore Vidal's 1989 television film starring Val Kilmer as Billy and Duncan Regehr as Pat Garrett
- Bill and Ted's Excellent Adventure, a 1989 film, which included several historical figures traveling through time, including Billy the Kid, who was portrayed by Dan Shor.
- Young Guns II, Geoff Murphy's 1990 motion picture starring Emilio Estevez as Billy and William Petersen as Pat Garrett
- Purgatory, Uli Edel's 1999 made-for-TV movie starring Donnie Wahlberg as Deputy Glen/Billy The Kid
- Requiem for Billy the Kid, Anne Feinsilber's 2006 motion picture starring Kris Kristofferson
- Birth of a Legend, a 2011 film in two parts based on Frederick Nolan's book The Lincoln County War: A Documentary History directed by Andrew Wilkinson
- The Kid, a 2019 film directed by Vincent D'Onofrio and starring Dane DeHaan as Billy the Kid.
- Old Henry, a 2021 film directed by Potsy Ponciroli and starring Tim Blake Nelson as Henry McCarty. The film posits Billy returned to his birth name after surviving the supposed assassination.

== Music ==
- "Billy the Kid" is a western folk song in the public domain, which was published in John A. Lomax and Alan Lomax's American Ballads and Folksongs album, and also their Cowboy Songs and Other Frontier Ballads album. Members of the Western Writers of America chose it as one of the Top 100 Western songs of all time. The song's lyrics perpetuate several myths about the Kid, such as his exaggerated kill count of "twenty-one men" and the suggestion that Pat Garrett had known him as a friend.
- There have been many recordings of this song, including versions by the Sons of the Pioneers (1937), Woody Guthrie (1940, recorded by Alan Lomax for the Library of Congress #3412 B_{2}), Tex Ritter (1945), and Marty Robbins (1959, on his Gunfighter Ballads and Trail Songs album).
- Woody Guthrie later used the same melody for his song "So Long, it's Been Good to Know You". He also recorded it in 1944 for Moe Asch's Asch/Folkways label (MA67).
- Bob Dylan's album Pat Garrett and Billy the Kid, soundtrack of the 1973 film by Sam Peckinpah.
- "The Ballad of Billy the Kid", song sung by Billy Joel on the 1973 Piano Man album.
- Charlie Daniels recorded the song "Billy the Kid" on his 1976 album High Lonesome. Chris LeDoux also covered the song on his album Haywire.
- Joe Ely recorded the song "Me and Billy the Kid" on his 1987 album Lord of the Highway.
- Running Wild recorded the song "Billy the Kid" on their 1991 album Blazon Stone.
- Tom Petty wrote the song "Billy the Kid", released on his 1999 album Echo.
- Dia Frampton's "Billy the Kid," on the 2011 album Red.
- Jon Bon Jovi's album, Blaze of Glory, was used as part of the soundtrack for Young Guns II.
- Ry Cooder recorded the folk song "Billy the Kid", on the album Into The Purple Valley, with his own melody and instrumental. It was also on Ry Cooder Classics Volume II.
- The Heavy Horses recorded Billy the Kid's legend in their song "Anyone Can Tell" on their debut album, Murder Ballads & Other Love Songs.
- "Las Cruces Jail", a 2005 song by Two Gallants, is about Billy the Kid's imprisonment.
- Dutch girl group Luv’ recorded a song entitled “Billy The Kid”, on their 1981 album Forever Yours.
- The Mountain Goats have written and recorded two songs about the life of Billy the Kid, "Billy the Kid's Dream of the Magic Shoes" on the 1993 single Chile de Árbol (later re-released on the Protein Source of the Future...Now! compilation CD in 1999), and "Catherine Antrim's Kid" on the 2011 demo cassette release All Survivors Pack.

== Stage ==
- Billy the Kid, 1906 Broadway play co-written by Joseph Santley and Walwin (Walter) Woods.
- Aaron Copland's Billy the Kid, music and ballet that premiered in 1938.
- Michael McClure's 1965 play The Beard recounts a fictional meeting between Billy the Kid and Jean Harlow.
- Ben Morales Frost and Richard Hough's 2017 musical, Billy The Kid for the National Youth Music Theatre.
- Michael Ondaatje's 1973 play, The Collected Works of Billy the Kid.

== Radio ==
- The first episode of the Gunsmoke radio series, broadcast on April 2, 1952 and titled "Billy the Kid", purports to tell of Billy's first murder as a runaway boy and credits Matt Dillon with giving him the "Billy the Kid" moniker.
- The CBS radio series Crime Classics told the story of Billy the Kid in its October 21, 1953 episode (#17) titled "Billy Bonney – Bloodletter". The episode featured Sam Edwards as Billy the Kid and William Conrad as Pat Garrett.

== Television ==
- Richard Jaeckel played The Kid in the 1954 episode "Billy the Kid" of the syndicated television series Stories of the Century.
- The NBC series The Tall Man ran from 1960 to 1962, starring Clu Gulager as Billy the Kid and Barry Sullivan as Pat Garrett.
- Robert Vaughn starred as Billy the Kid in a 1957 episode ("Billy the Kid") of the series Tales of Wells Fargo.
- Billy the Kid is portrayed as an anthropomorphic goat in the 1960 animated television series The New Adventures Of Pinocchio, voiced by Paul Kligman.
- Andrew Prine portrayed Billy the Kid in "The Outlaw and the Nun," a 1963 episode of The Great Adventure, which dramatized the Kid's acquaintance with Sister Blandina, a Catholic Sister of Charity who did missionary work in New Mexico, played by Joan Hackett.
- Robert Blake starred as Billy the Kid in the 1966 Death Valley Days episode "The Kid from Hell's Kitchen". Tom Heaton also starred as Billy the Kid in season 16, episode "Lost Sheep in Trinidad".
- Robert Walker Jr. starred as Billy the Kid in the 1967 episode "Billy the Kid" of the Irwin Allen science fiction series The Time Tunnel.
- Billy the Kid was played by Frank Koppala in an episode of the science fiction show Voyagers! entitled "Bully and Billy." The episode aired on October 24, 1982.
- Billy the Kid is portrayed as a zombie in the 2002 Simpsons episode "Treehouse of Horror XIII"
- American Experience season 24 episode "Billy the Kid", aired on PBS January 9, 2012.
- Jor-el Vaasborg starred as Billy the Kid in the 2015 National Geographic TV documentary Billy the Kid: New Evidence, narrated by Kevin Costner.
- Derek Chariton starred as Billy the Kid in the 2016 AMC documentary The American West, narrated by Bert Thomas Morris.
- Billy the Kid was among fifteen historical and mythological figures portrayed in the 2016 tokusatsu show Kamen Rider Ghost. He was voiced by Tomokazu Seki.
- Billy the Kid starring Tom Blyth as the Kid, a television drama series based on the titular figure, premiered on April 24, 2022, on Epix, later MGM+. The series ran for three seasons, consisting of 24 episodes.

== Video games ==
- In the mobile game Fate/Grand Order, Billy the Kid is an Archer-class Servant who debuted as an ally in the 5th chapter of the main story.
- In Call of Juarez: Gunslinger Billy the Kid is one of the allies of the main character Silas Greaves and is rescued by him.
- In Zenless Zone Zero, Billy Kid is a playable combat android and part of the Cunning Hares faction. He was named by his previous cowboy-centric boss.

== Museums and exhibitions ==
- A Billy the Kid Museum in Fort Sumner, New Mexico, presents Billy the Kid as a central subject within displays of regional history and artifacts.
- A Billy the Kid Museum in the town of Hico, Texas, which has promoted a local legend that Billy the Kid survived and lived there under the name "Brushy Bill Roberts", is devoted to that claim and associated memorabilia.
- The New Mexico Department of Cultural Affairs operates the Lincoln, New Mexico Historic Site, where interpretation of the Lincoln County War and its participants includes Billy the Kid as a principal figure.
- The New Mexico History Museum has displayed artifacts associated with Billy the Kid (including restraints associated with his 1881 imprisonment and escape) in its Telling New Mexico exhibition, and has published related object records online.
- The Museum of the West in Scottsdale, Arizona, announced a 2025 exhibition, The Resurrection of Billy the Kid, focused on artistic reinterpretations of the figure in popular culture.
