= Mark J. Dworkin =

Canadian writer and historian

- Born: January 21, 1946; Toronto, Ontario
- Died: August 31, 2012 (aged 66); Toronto, Ontario
- Occupations: Historian; Author; Researcher; Editor
- Years active: 1990–2012

Mark J. Dworkin (January 21, 1946 – August 31, 2012) was a Canadian writer of American Western history and an author, notable for his publication, American Mythmaker: Walter Noble Burns and the Legends of Billy the Kid, Wyatt Earp, and Joaquín Murrieta. Dworkin was a noted historian, researcher and editor, and considered an expert on Central and South American ancient cultures. In 1990, he wrote Mayas, Aztecs, and Incas: Mysteries of ancient civilizations of Central and South America, a popular textbook, still in use in many schools.

== Walter Noble Burns Biography ==
Dworkin compiled American Mythmaker: Walter Noble Burns and the Legends of Billy the Kid, Wyatt Earp, and Joaquin Murrieta, the biography of Walter Noble Burns. Burns's books brought Wild West legends to American culture during the 1920s, which included movies, radio programs, new books about the Wild West - and later, 1950s television shows about the Wild West. Without Burns, few Americans would likely know about Billy the Kid today. Dworkin showed how Burns had introduced the American West to the 1920s readers - during which time, Burns made his subjects household names.

During the 1920s, Walter Noble Burns was America’s popular chronicler of the American Old West. His newspaper reporter background enabled him with research skills that most Western writers were lacking, and his publications were marketed as true histories. Dworkin sought to establish that Burns wasn’t just writing potboilers, but was an early practitioner of creative non-fiction. Dworkin argued that Burns intentionally created mythology for America, and significantly discussed the importance of folk tradition of the American West and Burns’s oral history work that contributed to his writings. American Mythmaker brought Mark J. Dworkin a 2012 Spur Award finalist nomination for best Western short nonfiction, though it was after his death.

== Wild West Editing Career ==
Dworkin's articles were published in Wild West Magazine, True West Magazine and several others. Dworkin served as book review editor of the Wild West History Association Journal He wrote several Wyatt Earp related articles, and also about Virgil Earp for the Western Outlaw-Lawman History Association, WOLA. Those articles provided well-researched facts about the Gunfight at the O.K. Corral in Tombstone, Arizona on October 26, 1881.

== Publications ==
- American mythmaker : Walter Noble Burns and the legends of Billy the Kid, Wyatt Earp, and Joaquin Murrieta, by Mark J. Dworkin, 2015
- Mayas, Aztecs, and Incas : Mysteries of ancient civilizations of Central and South America, by Mark J. Dworkin, 1990
