= Rick Geary =

American cartoonist and illustrator (born 1946)

- Geary, photographed at the 2004 Alternative Press Expo (APE) in San Francisco.
- Born: February 25, 1946 (age 80) Kansas City, Missouri
- Areas: Penciller, Inker, Writer
- Notable works: A Treasury of Victorian Murder (graphic novel series)
- Awards: Inkpot Award, 1980; National Cartoonist Society Magazine and Book Illustration Award, 1994; Eisner Award, 2007
- Spouse: Deborah

Rick Geary (born February 25, 1946) is an American cartoonist and illustrator. He is known for works such as A Treasury of Victorian Murder and graphic novel biographies of Leon Trotsky and J. Edgar Hoover.

== Biography ==
Rick Geary was born on February 25, 1946, in Kansas City, Missouri. He attended the University of Kansas.

Geary was initially introduced to comic readers in the late 1970s with his contributions to the Heavy Metal and National Lampoon magazines.

He has also created several postcards and illustrations for all kinds of publications. In 1982, he created the Toucan mascot for San Diego Comic-Con until its retirement in 1995. Additionally, he created Expo Boy, the mascot for the San Diego Comic Book Expo, a comics industry trade show Comic-Con held from 1984 through 2001. However, perhaps his most widely circulated illustration is his logo for the audiobook publisher Recorded Books.

Geary has drawn a variety of solo comic books and graphic novels for various publishers, including adaptations of Great Expectations, The Invisible Man, and Wuthering Heights for the revived Classics Illustrated series and a kid-oriented Flaming Carrot spinoff.

His most extensive project is his ongoing non-fiction comic book series, A Treasury of Victorian Murder, published by NBM Publishing. The series chronicles 19th-century criminals such as H. H. Holmes, Lizzie Borden, Charles Guiteau, and Jack the Ripper. In the series, he often uses literary devices characteristic of 19th-century popular literature. For example, The Borden Tragedy is narrated through excerpts from a period diary, and The Fatal Bullet didactically contrasts the lives and morality of Guiteau and his victim, President James Garfield.

Geary's recent projects include the adaptation of Mathew Klickstein's Daisy goes to the Moon for Fantagraphics in January 2025.

In 2025, Movie Girls: Lillian and Dorothy, the story of how the Gish sisters (Lillian and Dorothy) met Mary Pickford and D.W. Griffith and began acting in motion pictures, was published. It was written by Jan Wahl.

== Art style ==
Geary's distinctive cartooning style evolved from his early imitations of Edward Gorey. His drawings typically consist of stark, clean black lines against a white background, with no half-tone or shading.

Even more distinctive is Geary's method of panel art. Most comics artists will draw several consecutive sequential panels of the same characters in the same setting. Geary, uniquely, rarely devotes two consecutive panels to the same locale or character. This creates a constant impression of jumping from one image to another.

In reviewing Geary's graphic novel The Lindbergh Child: America's Hero and the Crime of the Century (2008), Wired magazine noted that Geary had "little interest in psychology or interiority, relying instead on his dispassionate pen and the public record to stir up needed drama." Geary himself commented, "I feel that with true crime stories, the material is sensational enough on its own without my adding another layer of gruesomeness... I affect a detached narrative voice and back away from the graphic depiction of violence not because I'm squeamish... but because I enjoy creating a tension between form and content."

Mathew Klickstein's graphic novel Daisy Goes to the Moon, based on his 2008 novella published initially by Portland-area upstart AtomSmashers, was illustrated by Geary, published by Fantagraphics in January 2025 and praised by Publishers Weekly, "Geary ably adapts Klickstein's whimsical novel, written in the naive voice of real-life Victorian child author Daisy Ashford. ... Geary's artwork, with touches that recall turn-of-the-century comic strips and antique printing techniques, is perfectly suited to Victoriana."

== Personal life ==
Geary appeared on Jeopardy! on March 14, 1994.

As of 2016, Geary lived with his wife, Deborah, in Carrizozo, New Mexico.

== Awards ==
Geary has won two National Cartoonist Society awards: a Magazine and Book Illustration Award in 1994, and a Graphic Novel award in 2017.

His book Gumby, written by Bob Burden, was given the 2007 Eisner Award for Best Title for Younger Readers/Best Comics Publication for a Younger Audience

== Notable works ==
- At Home with Rick Geary (1985) Fantagraphics Books
- Classics Illustrated, Berkley Publishing Group
  - Great Expectations, adapted from the novel by Charles Dickens (1990)
  - Wuthering Heights, adapted from the novel by Emily Brontë (1990)
  - The Invisible Man, adapted from the novel by H.G. Wells (1991)
- Housebound with Rick Geary (1991) Fantagraphics Books
- Cravan (2005) Dark Horse Books
- (with Bob Burden) Gumby (Wildcard Ink, 2007)
- Biography series:
  - J. Edgar Hoover: A Graphic Biography (2008) Hill and Wang
  - Trotsky: A Graphic Biography (2009) Hill and Wang
- The Adventures of Blanche (2009) Dark Horse Comics
- Louise Brooks, Detective (2015) NBM/ComicsLit
- The True Death of Billy the Kid

A Treasury of Victorian Murder
Series, published by NBM/ComicsLit

- A Treasury of Victorian Murder (1987)
- Jack the Ripper (1995) is about the unsolved 1888 serial murders by Jack the Ripper.
- The Borden Tragedy (1997) is about the 1892 murder of Andrew and Abby Borden and the subsequent trial of Lizzie Borden.
- The Fatal Bullet (1999) is about the 1881 murder of James A. Garfield by Charles Guiteau.
- The Mystery of Mary Rogers (2001) is about the unsolved 1841 disappearance and murder of Mary Rogers.
- The Beast of Chicago (2003) is about serial murders by H. H. Holmes during the 1893 World's Columbian Exposition.
- The Murder of Abraham Lincoln (2005) is about the 1865 assassination of Abraham Lincoln by John Wilkes Booth.
- The Case of Madeleine Smith (2006) is about the 1857 murder of Pierre Emile L'Angelier and the trial of Madeleine Smith.
- The Saga of the Bloody Benders (2007) is about the Bloody Benders, a family of serial killers who operated in rural Kansas between 1871 and 1873.

A Treasury of XXth Century Murder
Series, published by NBM/ComicsLit

- The Lindbergh Child (2008) is about the 1932 kidnapping of Charles Augustus Lindbergh Jr.
- Famous Players (2009) is about the unsolved 1922 murder of William Desmond Taylor.
- The Terrible Axe-Man of New Orleans (2010) is about the unsolved serial murders between 1918 and 1919 attributed to the Axeman of New Orleans.
- The Lives of Sacco and Vanzetti (2011) is about the controversial trial, conviction, and execution of Sacco and Vanzetti between 1921 and 1927.
- Lovers' Lane: The Hall-Mills Mystery (2012) is about the 1922 murder of Eleanor Mills and Edward Hall and the subsequent high-profile trial.
- Madison Square Tragedy: The Murder of Stanford White (2013) is about the 1906 murder of Stanford White by Harry Kendall Thaw.
- Black Dahlia (2016) is about the 1947 unsolved murder of Elizabeth Short, who was posthumously known as the Black Dahlia.
