= Marshall Ashmun Upson =

American journalist and author (1828–1894)

- Ash Upson
- Born: November 23, 1828; New Haven County, Connecticut
- Died: October 6, 1894 (aged 65); Uvalde, Texas
- Occupations: Journalist; Author; Postmaster; Justice of the Peace
- Years active: 1850–1894

Marshall Ashmun "Ash" Upson (1828–1894) was a newspaper journalist for several years, postmaster, justice of the peace, and author. He is notable for having ghostwritten the book The Authentic Life of Billy, the Kid, by Pat F. Garrett, 1882.

== Early life ==
Marshall Ashmun Upson was born November 23, 1828, the son of Samuel Wheeler Upson and Sally Maria Stevens of Waterbury Township, New Haven County, Connecticut . Upson had married once, but later divorced. He then drifted West during the Civil War after working as a reporter for the New York Tribune. Afterwards, he established the Albuquerque Press in 1867.

== Career ==
He gained his reputation as a writer while employed as the city editor of The Cincinnati Enquirer. From Ohio, he went to Louisiana, then Missouri and published a paper there for several years. Upson then drifted to Denver, Colorado where he was a writer for the Denver News. He was later engaged in the newspaper business in Santa Fe, New Mexico.

== Ghostwriter ==
After Sheriff Pat Garrett gunned down Billy the Kid in July 1881, he asked Marshall "Ash" Upson to ghostwrite his version of the story. The Authentic Life of Billy the Kid came out in early 1882, but failed to sell until years later. Upson and Garrett formed a real estate company in 1889, which failed. Although not many copies of The Authentic Life of Billy, the Kid were sold, it had a decisive impact on the Kid's image. More than any other single influence, the book fed the legend of Billy the Kid. As the legend grew, writers turned to this book for authentic details. For more than a century, only a few researchers questioned the wild tales contained within Upson's book.

== Later years ==
Marshall "Ash" Upson was the postmaster at Roswell, New Mexico, and served as a justice of the peace in eastern Lincoln County, New Mexico. Some claimed that Sheriff Pat Garrett was almost illiterate and he employed Upson as his clerk to maintain the records of the sheriff's office. Garrett and Upson became close friends, which lasted until Upson's death on October 6, 1894. He was buried in a cemetery lot owned by Pat Garrett in Uvalde, Texas.
