= The Authentic Life of Billy, the Kid =

1882 book by Pat Garrett

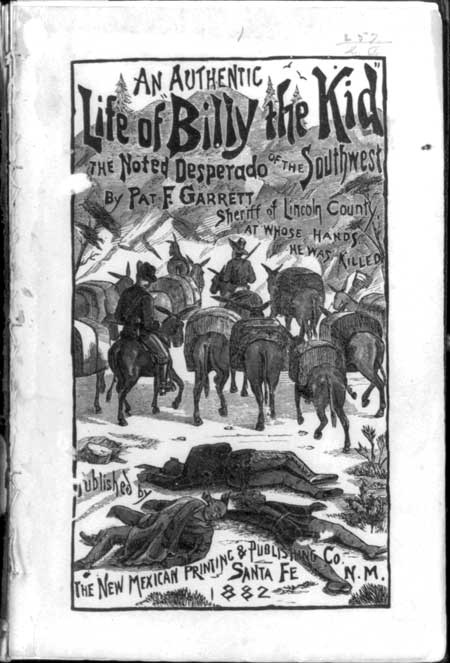
- 1882 book cover
- Authors: Garrett, Pat F.; (Upson, Ash – ghostwriter)
- Original title: The Authentic Life of Billy, the Kid, The Noted Desperado of the Southwest
- Language: English
- Genre: biography · history
- Published: Versions: 1882 (Santa Fé, New Mexico Printing and Publishing Company); 1927 (New York, The Macmillan Company); 1946 (New York, Atomic Books, Inc.); 1953 (Houston, The Frontier Press of Texas); 1954 (The Western Frontier Library, Norman, University of Oklahoma Press); 1994 (New York, Indian Head Books)

The Authentic Life of Billy, the Kid, The Noted Desperado of the Southwest is a biography and partly first-hand account written by Pat Garrett, sheriff of Lincoln County, New Mexico, in collaboration with a ghostwriter, Marshall Ashmun "Ash" Upson. During the summer of 1881 in a small New Mexican village, Garrett shot and killed the notorious outlaw, William H. Bonney, better known as Billy the Kid. Due to the first publisher's inability to widely distribute this book beginning in 1882, it sold relatively few copies during Garrett's lifetime. By the time the fifth publisher purchased the copyright in 1954, this book had become a major reference for historians who have studied the Kid's brief life. The promotion and distribution of the fifth version of this book to libraries in the United States and Europe sent it into a sixth printing in 1965, and by 1976 it had reached its tenth printing. For a generation after Sheriff Garrett shot the Kid, his account was considered to be factual, but historians have since found in this book many embellishments and inconsistencies with other accounts of the life of Billy the Kid.

== Purpose ==
In the weeks that followed the death of Billy the Kid, several articles written mostly in New Mexican newspapers and dime novels depicted the Kid's death in ways that put Pat Garrett in a bad light. As the author wrote in his introduction to this biography, "I am incited to this labor, in a measure, by an impulse to correct the thousand false statements which have appeared in the public newspapers and in yellow-covered, cheap novels." Garrett's purpose comes in two parts; firstly, he wanted to publicly respond to the speculative accusations against him about Billy the Kid's death that were being printed, and secondly, he wanted to set the record straight regarding the more notable incidents that had involved the notorious outlaw beginning with his early life and leading up to his untimely death. Many people had begun to gossip about the unfairness of Garrett's final encounter with the Kid, so his first reason, which was to clear his name, was decidedly his main purpose.

Still smarting from local outrage in New Mexico over his shooting of the Kid, Garrett wanted to present his side of the story and hoped to turn a profit, as well, on the American public's fascination with the outlaw. Consequently, he published his account of Bonney's life and death in 1882. It was credited to Garrett, but the first 15 chapters were a concoction of factual material mixed with fabrications, written by Roswell's postmaster, Ash Upson, an itinerant journalist. The remaining chapters, written in a more restrained style, are generally accurate, and were likely composed by Garrett himself.

The book failed to find a wide audience, so sold just a few copies; nevertheless, although filled with many errors of fact, The Authentic Life served afterwards as the main source for most books written about the Kid until the 1960s. Thus was established the mythic stature of Pat Garrett as the heroic lawman in pursuit of the villainous but romantic desperado, Billy the Kid.

== Ghostwriter ==
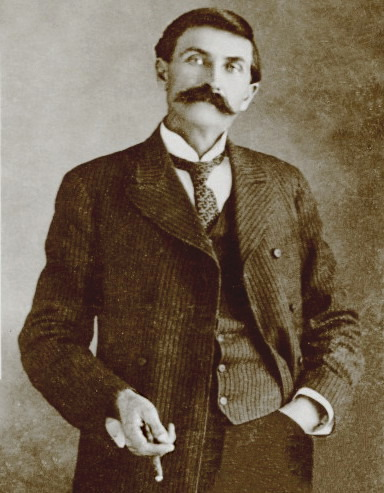
Pat Garrett

Ash Upson

Garrett, who did not consider himself a writer, called upon his friend, Marshall Ashmun "Ash" Upson, to ghostwrite this book with him. Ash Upson was an itinerant journalist who had a gift for graphic prose. Upson and Garrett shared equally in the royalties. As was noted in the introduction to the fifth version of this book:

Garrett and Upson became very close friends, and this friendship endured until Upson's death at Uvalde, Texas, in 1894. He was buried there in a cemetery lot owned by Pat Garrett. Garrett and Upson – friends and a writing team that produced a remarkable book.

— Pat Garrett and his Book, by J. C. Dykes

Good reason exists to believe that the legend of Billy the Kid, including the familiar historical figure he has become, would not be known at all today if this book had not been published.

== Versions ==
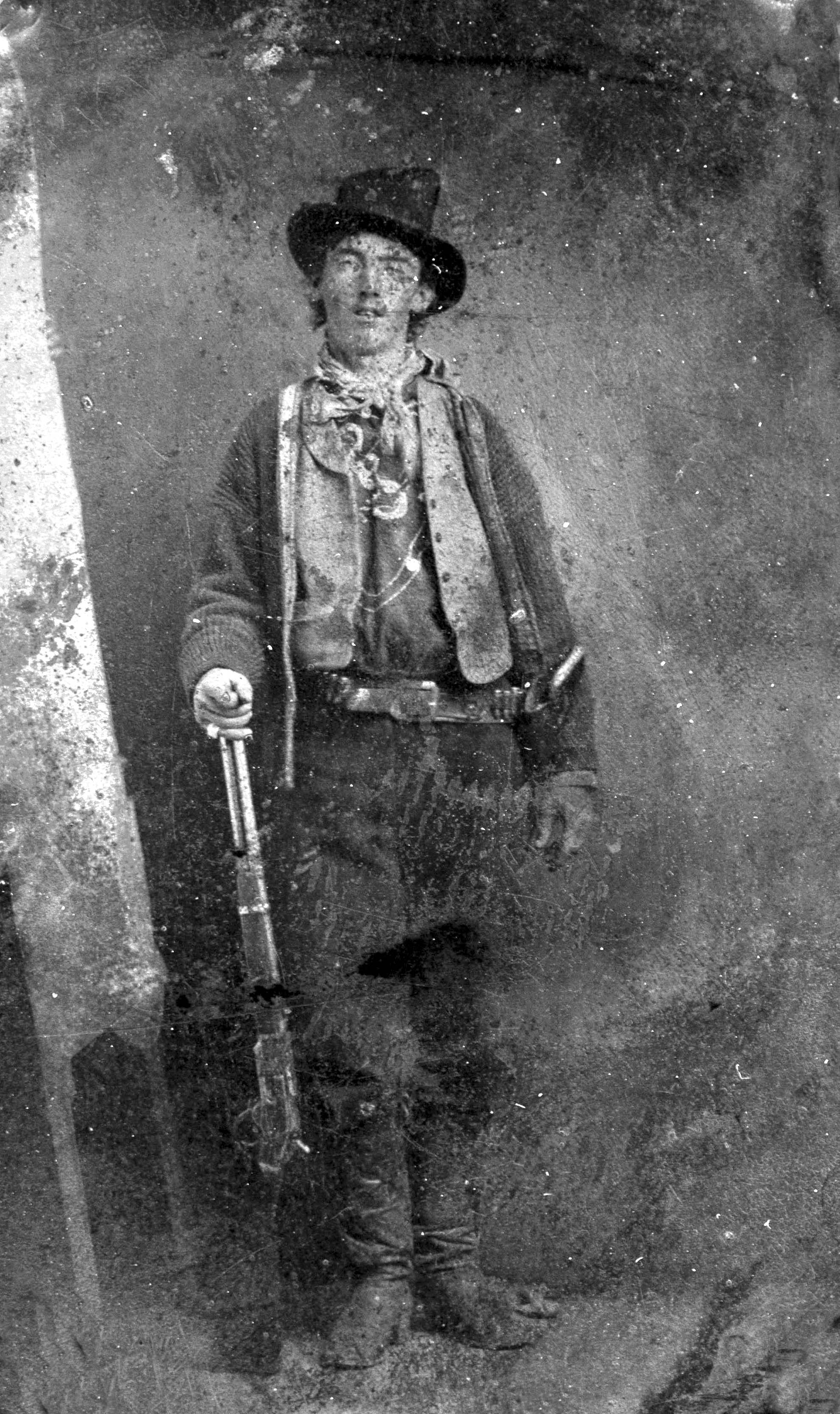
The only authenticated photograph of Billy the Kid

Six versions report Garrett's first-hand account. Brief descriptions of these are:

- Garrett, Pat F. (1882). The Authentic Life of Billy, the Kid, The Noted Desperado of the Southwest. Santa Fé: New Mexico Printing and Publishing Company. Copies of this version are exceedingly rare.
- Fulton, Maurice Garland, ed. (1927). Pat F. Garrett's Authentic Life of Billy the Kid. New York: The Macmillan Company. This version is also scarce. Colonel Fulton carefully edited and left copious notes to make this much superior to the first version.
- Garrett, Pat F. (Greatest Sheriff of the Old Southwest) (1946). J. Brussell (ed.). Authentic Story of Billy the Kid. New York: Atomic Books, Inc. This is a brief version of Garrett's work, the first in a series, American Folk-Lore and Humor, and published to sell for twenty-five cents.
- Garrett, Pat F. (1953). The Authentic Life of Billy the Kid, the Noted Desperado of the Southwest. Houston: The Frontier Press of Texas. This version is still available. It contains photographs of several of the book's characters from the well-known Noah H. Rose collection.
- Garrett, Pat F. (1965) [Original printing 1954]. The Authentic Life of Billy, the Kid, the Noted Desperado of the Southwest, Whose Deeds of Daring and Blood Made His Name a Terror in New Mexico, Arizona, & Northern Mexico: a Faithful and Interesting Narrative by Pat F. Garrett, Sheriff of Lincoln Co., N. M., by Whom He was Finally Hunted Down & Captured by Killing Him. "The Western Frontier Library". Norman: University of Oklahoma Press. ISBN 1-4099-1035-0. LCCN 54010053. This version is widely available. The first printing was in August 1954, sixth printing in July 1965, and tenth printing in 1976, with an introduction by J. C. Dykes.
- Garrett, Pat F. (1994). The Authentic Life of Billy the Kid. The Noted Desperado. New York, NY: Indian Head Books. ISBN 1-5661-9501-2. This version contains photographs, illustrations, maps, and notes and is widely available.

Also, many smaller publishers offer facsimiles of these versions.

== See also ==
- Brushy Bill Roberts
- Cowboy
- Folklore of the United States
- Lincoln County War
- List of Old West gunfighters
- List of Old West lawmen
- Robert M. Utley
- The Old West: The Gunfighters
