= Walter Noble Burns =

American writer (1866–1932)

- Born: October 24, 1866; Lebanon, Kentucky, US
- Died: April 15, 1932 (aged 65); Chicago, Illinois, US
- Occupations: Historian; Author; Researcher; Journalist
- Years active: 1900–1932

Walter Noble Burns (October 24, 1866 – April 15, 1932) was a writer of Western history. He was notable for his books, especially his best-selling, The Saga of Billy the Kid (1926). Burns' books helped create the legends and perpetuate the fame of Billy the Kid, Wyatt Earp, and Joaquin Murietta. Biographer Dworkin called him "America's premier romantic outlaw lawman mythmaker."

== Life ==
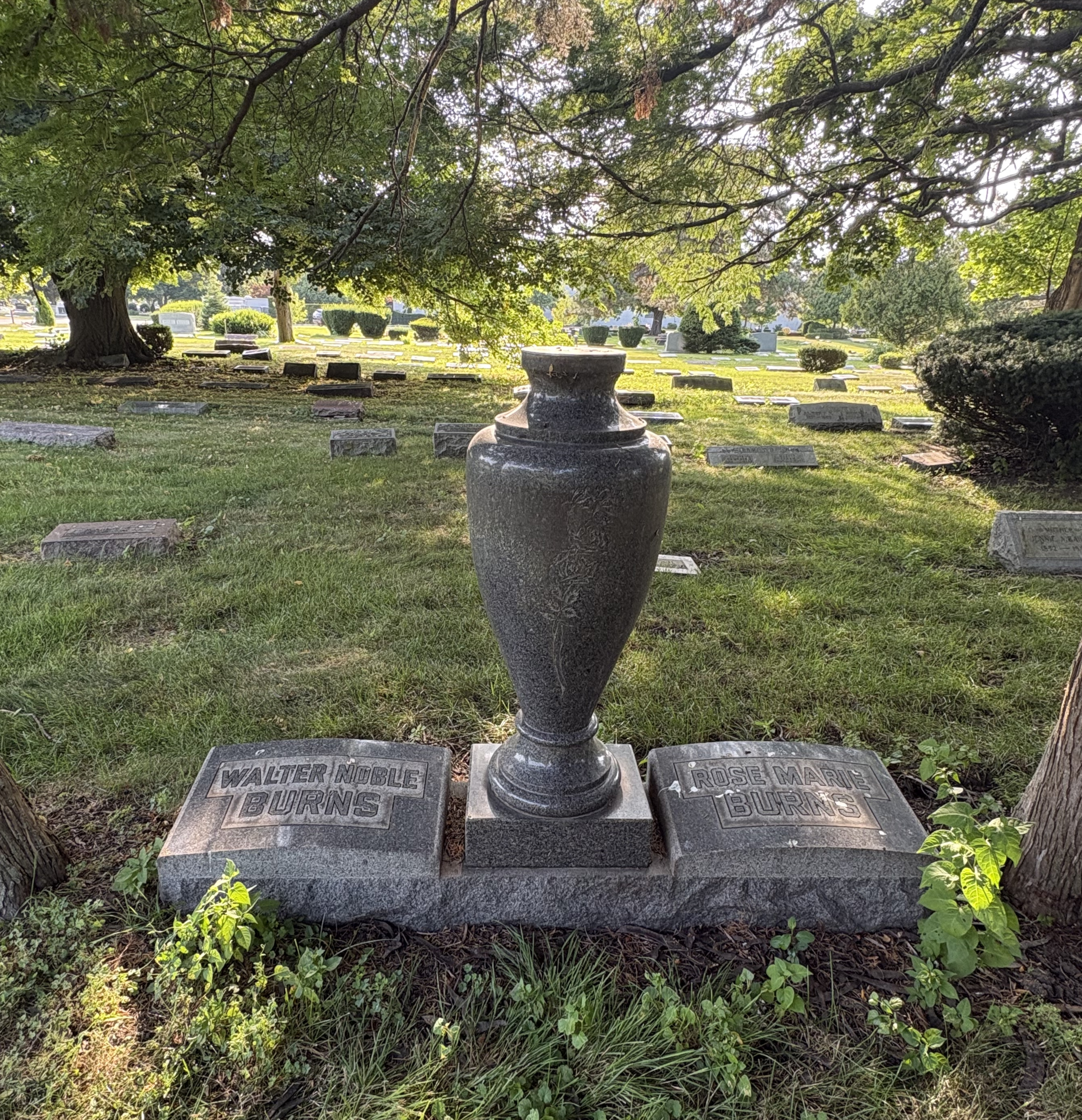
Burns' grave at Memorial Park Cemetery

Burns was born on October 24, 1866, in Lebanon, Kentucky. He was the son of Thomas E. Burns (1837–1908), a colonel in the Union Army during the American Civil War. Walter's mother, Mary Crisella Noble (1847–1871), died when he was four years old. He and his father, Thomas E. Burns, were recorded as resident with his mother's parents, Lorenzo H. Noble (1819–1899) and Alice Ann Noble (1823–1899), during the 1870 and 1880 Federal Censuses in Marion County, Kentucky. Noble was an attorney from Maine, who had migrated to Kentucky, and became a prominent attorney & judge.

His father has financial problems and was unable to send Walter to college. Burns worked as a newspaper reporter for the Louisville Post from 1887 to 1890. He moved west to San Francisco in 1890 and spent a year working on a whaling ship. While living in California, he became a reporter for several eastern newspapers. In 1898 he served with the 1st Kentucky Infantry during the Spanish American War. Settling in Chicago in 1900, Burns resumed his journalism career, becoming a prominent literary critic and crime reporter. He married Rose Marie Hoke on November 10, 1902.

In 1900, he moved to Chicago, Illinois, and resumed his career as a journalist, literary critic, and crime reporter. After World War I, Burns retired as a reporter and began researching and writing about Western American legends. In 1927, he was diagnosed with cancer, and died of the disease in 1932. He was buried at Memorial Park Cemetery in Skokie.

== Books ==
Burns' first book, A Year with a Whaler, was published in 1913. It described his experiences working on a whaleboat. Subsequent books were The Saga of Billy the Kid (1926); Tombstone: An Iliad of the West (1927); The One-way Ride: The Red Trail of Chicago Gangland from Prohibition to Jake Lingle (1931); and The Robin Hood of El Dorado: The Saga of Joaquin Murrieta, Famous Outlaw of California's Age of Gold (1932).

Burns was inspired to write The Saga of Billy the Kid (1926) when he met a friend of Pat Garrett's while reporting on the Pershing Expedition to capture Pancho Villa in Mexico in 1916–1917. In 1923, he journeyed to New Mexico for three months to interview survivors from the Lincoln County War in which Billy the Kid was a participant. Paulita Maxwell, reputedly Billy's lover, was one of his informants. Another was Susan McSween, widow of Alexander McSween who employed Billy during the war. Burns also spent many hours reading old newspaper accounts and examining records in county courthouses.

At the time Burns wrote the book, Billy the Kid had faded from American consciousness. In 1925, Western author Harvey Fergusson had inquired, "Who remembers Billy the Kid?" Burns' book brought Billy, the outlaw and gunfighter, back into an enduring fame. One scholar counted fifty-two movies featuring Billy the Kid between 1911 and 1999.

Burns followed the same procedure in writing Tombstone: An Iliad of the West (1927) as he had Billy the Kid. He interviewed survivors and researched old newspaper accounts and court house records of the silver-mining town of Tombstone, Arizona from its founding in 1879 to the mid-1880s. Wyatt Earp and the Gunfight at the OK Corral feature prominently in the book. In 1926, Burns interviewed Earp, but Earp declined to help him, saying he had written a book about himself. Earp later changed his mind, but Burns refused Earp's help because he had finished writing Tombstone and it was ready for publication. Earp's account of himself was never published. He was unhappy with the Burns book.

The Robin Hood of Eldorado tells the story of Joaquin Murrieta, a California bandit portrayed favorably by Burns. Published only weeks before Burns' death, his choice of an Hispanic as a hero fighting against Anglos was unusual in the United States at the time. Historians differ on whether Murietta was only a bandit or also a Mexican patriot. Burns' Murietta is a Robin Hood.

Burns' trilogy of western histories has been derided as semi-fiction by academic historians but his prominence as a mythmaker of the American West in not in dispute. Western writer Preston Lewis said his books are "part journalism, part history, and part imagination." Burns said of himself that "he didn't write history but stories based on history." Of The Saga of Billy the Kid, he said, "The foregoing tales may be regarded, as you please, as the apocryphal cantos of the saga of Billy the Kid. They are not fully authenticated, though possibly they are, in the main, true." Not the least of his accomplishments was to interview Hispanics and incorporate their views and their words into his books.

== Filmography ==
- Billy the Kid, 1930
- Robin Hood of El Dorado, 1936
- Billy the Kid, 1941
- Tombstone, the Town Too Tough to Die, 1942

== Biography ==
Mark J. Dworkin (1946–2012) compiled a biography about Walter Noble Burns, entitled American Mythmaker: Walter Noble Burns and the Legends of Billy the Kid, Wyatt Earp, and Joaquín Murrieta. Dworkin died in 2012, prior to the completion of this book, which was published in 2015 by the University of Oklahoma Press.
